= Beryozovka, Russia =

Beryozovka (Russian: Берёзовка) or Berezovka is the name of several inhabited localities in Russia.

== Modern localities ==
=== Altai Krai ===
As of 2012, twelve rural localities in Altai Krai bear this name:

- Berezovka, Barnaul, Altai Krai, a settlement in Nauchnogorodokskaya Settlement Administration under the administrative jurisdiction of Leninsky City District under the administrative jurisdiction of the city of krai significance of Barnaul; 53°23′N 83°25′E
- Berezovka, Charyshsky District, Altai Krai, a selo in Berezovsky Selsoviet of Charyshsky District; 51°16′N 83°37′E
- Berezovka, Khabarsky District, Altai Krai, a settlement in Martovsky Selsoviet of Khabarsky District; 53°29′N 79°33′E
- Berezovka, Krasnogorsky District, Altai Krai, a selo in Berezovsky Selsoviet of Krasnogorsky District; 52°21′N 85°50′E
- Berezovka, Krasnoshchyokovsky District, Altai Krai, a selo in Berezovsky Selsoviet of Krasnoshchyokovsky District; 51°50′N 82°58′E
- Berezovka, Pervomaysky District, Altai Krai, a selo in Berezovsky Selsoviet of Pervomaysky District; 53°25′N 84°0′E
- Berezovka, Pospelikhinsky District, Altai Krai, a settlement in Klepechikhinsky Selsoviet of Pospelikhinsky District; 52°12′N 81°47′E
- Berezovka, Rubtsovsky District, Altai Krai, a settlement in Bezrukavsky Selsoviet of Rubtsovsky District; 51°34′N 81°18′E
- Berezovka, Shipunovsky District, Altai Krai, a settlement in Bobrovsky Selsoviet of Shipunovsky District; 52°26′N 82°15′E
- Berezovka, Soloneshensky District, Altai Krai, a selo in Berezovsky Selsoviet of Soloneshensky District; 51°50′N 84°4′E
- Berezovka, Tyumentsevsky District, Altai Krai, a selo in Berezovsky Selsoviet of Tyumentsevsky District; 53°15′N 81°49′E
- Berezovka, Zmeinogorsky District, Altai Krai, a settlement in Karamyshevsky Selsoviet of Zmeinogorsky District; 51°9′N 82°5′E

=== Altai Republic ===
As of 2012, one rural locality in the Altai Republic bears this name:

- Berezovka, Altai Republic, a settlement in Ognevskoye Rural Settlement of Ust-Koksinsky District; 50°14′N 85°32′E

=== Amur Oblast ===
As of 2012, two rural localities in Amur Oblast bear this name:

- Berezovka, Ivanovsky District, Amur Oblast, a selo in Berezovsky Rural Settlement of Ivanovsky District
- Berezovka, Zeysky District, Amur Oblast, a selo in Nikolayevsky Rural Settlement of Zeysky District

=== Arkhangelsk Oblast ===
As of 2012, one rural locality in Arkhangelsk Oblast bears this name:

- Berezovka, Arkhangelsk Oblast, a settlement in Alexeyevsky Selsoviet of Krasnoborsky District

=== Republic of Bashkortostan ===
As of 2012, twelve rural localities in the Republic of Bashkortostan bear this name:

- Berezovka, Arkhangelsky District, Republic of Bashkortostan, a village in Irnykshinsky Selsoviet of Arkhangelsky District
- Berezovka, Aurgazinsky District, Republic of Bashkortostan, a village in Semenkinsky Selsoviet of Aurgazinsky District
- Berezovka, Belebeyevsky District, Republic of Bashkortostan, a village in Znamensky Selsoviet of Belebeyevsky District
- Berezovka, Birsky District, Republic of Bashkortostan, a selo in Berezovsky Selsoviet of Birsky District
- Berezovka, Bizhbulyaksky District, Republic of Bashkortostan, a village in Aitovsky Selsoviet of Bizhbulyaksky District
- Berezovka, Blagoveshchensky District, Republic of Bashkortostan, a village in Tugaysky Selsoviet of Blagoveshchensky District
- Berezovka, Davlekanovsky District, Republic of Bashkortostan, a selo in Alginsky Selsoviet of Davlekanovsky District
- Berezovka, Gafuriysky District, Republic of Bashkortostan, a village in Tabynsky Selsoviet of Gafuriysky District
- Berezovka, Karmaskalinsky District, Republic of Bashkortostan, a village in Karmaskalinsky Selsoviet of Karmaskalinsky District
- Berezovka, Sterlitamaksky District, Republic of Bashkortostan, a village in Kuganaksky Selsoviet of Sterlitamaksky District
- Berezovka, Ufimsky District, Republic of Bashkortostan, a village in Zubovsky Selsoviet of Ufimsky District
- Berezovka, Zilairsky District, Republic of Bashkortostan, a village in Kananikolsky Selsoviet of Zilairsky District

=== Belgorod Oblast ===
As of 2012, two rural localities in Belgorod Oblast bear this name:

- Berezovka, Borisovsky District, Belgorod Oblast, a selo in Borisovsky District
- Berezovka, Ivnyansky District, Belgorod Oblast, a selo in Ivnyansky District

=== Bryansk Oblast ===
As of 2012, nine rural localities in Bryansk Oblast bear this name:

- Berezovka, Karachevsky District, Bryansk Oblast, a settlement in Mylinsky Rural Administrative Okrug of Karachevsky District; 53°9′N 34°50′E
- Berezovka, Klimovsky District, Bryansk Oblast (or Beryozovka), a settlement in Kirillovsky Rural Administrative Okrug of Klimovsky District; 52°8′N 32°9′E
- Berezovka, Klintsovsky District, Bryansk Oblast, a village in Smolevichsky Rural Administrative Okrug of Klintsovsky District; 52°53′N 32°9′E
- Berezovka, Pochepsky District, Bryansk Oblast (or Beryozovka), a village in Polnikovsky Rural Administrative Okrug of Pochepsky District; 52°59′N 33°13′E
- Berezovka, Pogarsky District, Bryansk Oblast, a selo in Yudinovsky Rural Administrative Okrug of Pogarsky District; 52°41′N 33°20′E
- Berezovka, Rognedinsky District, Bryansk Oblast (or Beryozovka), a village in Selilovichsky Rural Administrative Okrug of Rognedinsky District; 53°49′N 33°41′E
- Berezovka, Starodubsky District, Bryansk Oblast (or Beryozovka), a village in Zankovsky Rural Administrative Okrug of Starodubsky District; 52°34′N 32°44′E
- Berezovka, Suzemsky District, Bryansk Oblast (or Beryozovka), a village in Kholmechsky Rural Administrative Okrug of Suzemsky District; 52°27′N 34°7′E
- Berezovka, Zhukovsky District, Bryansk Oblast (or Beryozovka), a village in Grishinoslobodsky Rural Administrative Okrug of Zhukovsky District; 53°35′N 33°43′E

=== Chelyabinsk Oblast ===
As of 2012, four rural localities in Chelyabinsk Oblast bear this name:

- Berezovka, Argayashsky District, Chelyabinsk Oblast, a village in Kuluyevsky Selsoviet of Argayashsky District
- Berezovka, Bredinsky District, Chelyabinsk Oblast, a settlement in Rymniksky Selsoviet of Bredinsky District
- Berezovka, Uvelsky District, Chelyabinsk Oblast, a settlement in Kamensky Selsoviet of Uvelsky District
- Berezovka, Uysky District, Chelyabinsk Oblast, a settlement in Nizhneustselemovsky Selsoviet of Uysky District

=== Chuvash Republic ===
As of 2012, three rural localities in the Chuvash Republic bear this name:

- Berezovka, Ibresinsky District, Chuvash Republic, a settlement in Berezovskoye Rural Settlement of Ibresinsky District
- Berezovka, Kanashsky District, Chuvash Republic, a village in Malokibechskoye Rural Settlement of Kanashsky District
- Berezovka, Krasnochetaysky District, Chuvash Republic, a village in Atnarskoye Rural Settlement of Krasnochetaysky District

=== Irkutsk Oblast ===
As of 2012, two rural localities in Irkutsk Oblast bear this name:

- Berezovka, Kazachinsko-Lensky District, Irkutsk Oblast, a village in Kazachinsko-Lensky District
- Berezovka, Tayshetsky District, Irkutsk Oblast, a selo in Tayshetsky District

=== Ivanovo Oblast ===
As of 2012, two rural localities in Ivanovo Oblast bear this name:

- Berezovka, Kineshemsky District, Ivanovo Oblast, a village in Kineshemsky District
- Berezovka, Zavolzhsky District, Ivanovo Oblast, a village in Zavolzhsky District

=== Kaliningrad Oblast ===
As of 2012, five rural localities in Kaliningrad Oblast bear this name:

- Berezovka, Bagrationovsky District, Kaliningrad Oblast, a settlement in Gvardeysky Rural Okrug of Bagrationovsky District
- Berezovka, Guryevsky District, Kaliningrad Oblast, a settlement in Khrabrovsky Rural Okrug of Guryevsky District
- Berezovka, Gvardeysky District, Kaliningrad Oblast, a settlement in Ozerkovsky Rural Okrug of Gvardeysky District
- Berezovka, Nemansky District, Kaliningrad Oblast, a settlement in Luninsky Rural Okrug of Nemansky District
- Berezovka, Polessky District, Kaliningrad Oblast, a settlement in Saransky Rural Okrug of Polessky District

=== Kaluga Oblast ===
As of 2012, three rural localities in Kaluga Oblast bear this name:

- Berezovka, Lyudinovsky District, Kaluga Oblast, a village in Lyudinovsky District
- Berezovka, Maloyaroslavetsky District, Kaluga Oblast, a village in Maloyaroslavetsky District
- Berezovka, Zhizdrinsky District, Kaluga Oblast, a village in Zhizdrinsky District

=== Republic of Karelia ===
As of 2012, one rural locality in the Republic of Karelia bears this name:

- Berezovka, Republic of Karelia, a settlement in Kondopozhsky District

=== Kemerovo Oblast ===
As of 2012, three rural localities in Kemerovo Oblast bear this name:

- Berezovka, Kiselyovsk, Kemerovo Oblast, a village under the administrative jurisdiction of Kiselyovsk Town Under Oblast Jurisdiction; 53°56′N 86°23′E
- Berezovka, Krapivinsky District, Kemerovo Oblast, a settlement in Shevelevskaya Rural Territory of Krapivinsky District; 55°8′N 86°31′E
- Berezovka, Leninsk-Kuznetsky District, Kemerovo Oblast, a settlement in Chusovitinskaya Rural Territory of Leninsk-Kuznetsky District; 54°50′N 86°12′E

=== Republic of Khakassia ===
As of 2012, one rural locality in the Republic of Khakassia bears this name:

- Berezovka, Republic of Khakassia, a village in Novorossiysky Selsoviet of Altaysky District

=== Kirov Oblast ===
As of 2012, six rural localities in Kirov Oblast bear this name:

- Berezovka, Kiknursky District, Kirov Oblast, a village in Shaptinsky Rural Okrug of Kiknursky District; 57°13′N 46°59′E
- Berezovka, Nemsky District, Kirov Oblast, a settlement under the administrative jurisdiction of Nema Urban-Type Settlement in Nemsky District; 57°30′N 50°28′E
- Berezovka, Oparinsky District, Kirov Oblast, a village in Molomsky Rural Okrug of Oparinsky District; 59°39′N 47°29′E
- Berezovka, Orichevsky District, Kirov Oblast, a village in Kuchelapovsky Rural Okrug of Orichevsky District; 58°10′N 49°28′E
- Berezovka, Sanchursky District, Kirov Oblast, a village in Korlyakovsky Rural Okrug of Sanchursky District; 57°8′N 46°54′E
- Berezovka, Zuyevsky District, Kirov Oblast, a settlement in Oktyabrsky Rural Okrug of Zuyevsky District; 58°4′N 51°15′E

=== Komi Republic ===
As of 2012, two rural localities in the Komi Republic bear this name:

- Berezovka, Pechora, Komi Republic, a settlement in Chikshino Rural-type Settlement Administrative Territory under the administrative jurisdiction of the town of republic significance of Pechora; 65°1′N 56°35′E
- Berezovka, Priluzsky District, Komi Republic, a village in Guryevka Selo Administrative Territory of Priluzsky District; 59°25′N 49°37′E

=== Kostroma Oblast ===
As of 2012, three rural localities in Kostroma Oblast bear this name:

- Berezovka, Nerekhtsky District, Kostroma Oblast, a village in Prigorodnoye Settlement of Nerekhtsky District; 57°23′N 40°26′E
- Berezovka, Ostrovsky District, Kostroma Oblast, a village in Alexandrovskoye Settlement of Ostrovsky District; 57°39′N 42°26′E
- Berezovka, Pavinsky District, Kostroma Oblast, a village in Petropavlovskoye Settlement of Pavinsky District; 59°6′N 46°22′E

=== Krasnoyarsk Krai ===
As of 2012, five inhabited localities in Krasnoyarsk Krai bear this name.

Urban localities

- Beryozovka, Beryozovsky District, Krasnoyarsk Krai, a work settlement in Beryozovsky District

Rural localities

- Berezovka, Abansky District, Krasnoyarsk Krai, a selo in Berezovsky Selsoviet of Abansky District
- Berezovka, Bogotolsky District, Krasnoyarsk Krai, a village in Yuryevsky Selsoviet of Bogotolsky District
- Berezovka, Bolsheuluysky District, Krasnoyarsk Krai, a selo in Berezovsky Selsoviet of Bolsheuluysky District
- Berezovka, Irbeysky District, Krasnoyarsk Krai, a village in Talsky Selsoviet of Irbeysky District

=== Kurgan Oblast ===
As of 2012, one rural locality in Kurgan Oblast bears this name:

- Berezovka, Kurgan Oblast, a village in Maysky Selsoviet of Kargapolsky District; 55°55′N 64°2′E

=== Leningrad Oblast ===
As of 2012, one rural locality in Leningrad Oblast bears this name:

- Berezovka, Leningrad Oblast, a village under the administrative jurisdiction of Mginskoye Settlement Municipal Formation in Kirovsky District; 59°37′N 31°21′E

=== Lipetsk Oblast ===
As of 2012, six rural localities in Lipetsk Oblast bear this name:

- Berezovka, Dankovsky District, Lipetsk Oblast, a selo in Berezovsky Selsoviet of Dankovsky District; 53°26′N 38°53′E
- Berezovka, Dobrinsky District, Lipetsk Oblast, a village in Verkhnematrensky Selsoviet of Dobrinsky District; 52°4′N 40°16′E
- Berezovka, Gryazinsky District, Lipetsk Oblast, a village in Verkhnetelelyuysky Selsoviet of Gryazinsky District; 52°21′N 39°49′E
- Berezovka, Stanovlyansky District, Lipetsk Oblast, a selo in Ostrovsky Selsoviet of Stanovlyansky District; 52°54′N 38°1′E
- Berezovka, Terbunsky District, Lipetsk Oblast, a selo in Berezovsky Selsoviet of Terbunsky District; 52°1′N 38°19′E
- Berezovka, Yeletsky District, Lipetsk Oblast, a village in Kazatsky Selsoviet of Yeletsky District; 52°36′N 38°20′E

=== Moscow Oblast ===
As of 2012, one rural locality in Moscow Oblast bears this name:

- Berezovka, Moscow Oblast, a khutor in Novopetrovskoye Rural Settlement of Istrinsky District; 56°1′N 36°19′E

=== Nizhny Novgorod Oblast ===
As of 2012, ten rural localities in Nizhny Novgorod Oblast bear this name:

- Berezovka, Kantaurovsky Selsoviet, Bor, Nizhny Novgorod Oblast, a village in Kantaurovsky Selsoviet under the administrative jurisdiction of the town of oblast significance of Bor
- Berezovka, Krasnoslobodsky Selsoviet, Bor, Nizhny Novgorod Oblast, a village in Krasnoslobodsky Selsoviet under the administrative jurisdiction of the town of oblast significance of Bor
- Berezovka, Lindovsky Selsoviet, Bor, Nizhny Novgorod Oblast, a village in Lindovsky Selsoviet under the administrative jurisdiction of the town of oblast significance of Bor
- Berezovka, Ardatovsky District, Nizhny Novgorod Oblast, a selo in Chuvarley-Maydansky Selsoviet of Ardatovsky District
- Berezovka, Arzamassky District, Nizhny Novgorod Oblast, a village in Berezovsky Selsoviet of Arzamassky District
- Berezovka, Bogorodsky District, Nizhny Novgorod Oblast, a village in Dudenevsky Selsoviet of Bogorodsky District
- Berezovka, Koverninsky District, Nizhny Novgorod Oblast, a village in Khokhlomsky Selsoviet of Koverninsky District
- Berezovka, Lukoyanovsky District, Nizhny Novgorod Oblast, a village in Lopatinsky Selsoviet of Lukoyanovsky District
- Berezovka, Urensky District, Nizhny Novgorod Oblast, a village in Mineyevsky Selsoviet of Urensky District
- Berezovka, Vachsky District, Nizhny Novgorod Oblast, a selo in Filinsky Selsoviet of Vachsky District

=== Novgorod Oblast ===
As of 2012, two rural localities in Novgorod Oblast bear this name:

- Berezovka, Novgorodsky District, Novgorod Oblast, a village in Yermolinskoye Settlement of Novgorodsky District
- Berezovka, Okulovsky District, Novgorod Oblast, a village under the administrative jurisdiction of the Settlement of Uglovskoye in Okulovsky District

=== Novosibirsk Oblast ===
As of 2012, seven rural localities in Novosibirsk Oblast bear this name:

- Berezovka, Bolotninsky District, Novosibirsk Oblast, a village in Bolotninsky District
- Berezovka, Iskitimsky District, Novosibirsk Oblast, a settlement in Iskitimsky District
- Berezovka, Kupinsky District, Novosibirsk Oblast, a village in Kupinsky District
- Berezovka, Kyshtovsky District, Novosibirsk Oblast, a selo in Kyshtovsky District
- Berezovka, Novosibirsky District, Novosibirsk Oblast, a settlement in Novosibirsky District
- Berezovka, Ordynsky District, Novosibirsk Oblast, a village in Ordynsky District
- Berezovka, Zdvinsky District, Novosibirsk Oblast, a settlement in Zdvinsky District

=== Omsk Oblast ===
As of 2012, eight rural localities in Omsk Oblast bear this name:

- Berezovka, Azovsky Nemetsky natsionalny District, Omsk Oblast, a selo in Berezovsky Rural Okrug of Azovsky Nemetsky National District
- Berezovka, Bolsherechensky District, Omsk Oblast, a village in Chebaklinsky Rural Okrug of Bolsherechensky District
- Berezovka, Gorkovsky District, Omsk Oblast, a village in Oktyabrsky Rural Okrug of Gorkovsky District
- Berezovka, Maryanovsky District, Omsk Oblast, a village in Orlovsky Rural Okrug of Maryanovsky District
- Berezovka, Okoneshnikovsky District, Omsk Oblast, a village in Zolotonivsky Rural Okrug of Okoneshnikovsky District
- Berezovka, Omsky District, Omsk Oblast, a village in Kalininsky Rural Okrug of Omsky District
- Berezovka, Pavlogradsky District, Omsk Oblast, a village in Novouralsky Rural Okrug of Pavlogradsky District
- Berezovka, Tavrichesky District, Omsk Oblast, a village in Lyubomirovsky Rural Okrug of Tavrichesky District

=== Orenburg Oblast ===
As of 2012, four rural localities in Orenburg Oblast bear this name:

- Berezovka, Buzuluksky District, Orenburg Oblast, a selo in Berezovsky Selsoviet of Buzuluksky District
- Berezovka, Kvarkensky District, Orenburg Oblast, a selo in Urtazymsky Selsoviet of Kvarkensky District
- Berezovka, Sharlyksky District, Orenburg Oblast, a settlement in Sarmanaysky Selsoviet of Sharlyksky District
- Berezovka, Sorochinsky District, Orenburg Oblast, a selo in Baklanovsky Selsoviet of Sorochinsky District

=== Oryol Oblast ===
As of 2012, seven rural localities in Oryol Oblast bear this name:

- Berezovka, Berezovsky Selsoviet, Dmitrovsky District, Oryol Oblast, a village in Berezovsky Selsoviet of Dmitrovsky District
- Berezovka, Borodinsky Selsoviet, Dmitrovsky District, Oryol Oblast, a village in Borodinsky Selsoviet of Dmitrovsky District
- Berezovka, Kolpnyansky District, Oryol Oblast, a village in Karlovsky Selsoviet of Kolpnyansky District
- Berezovka, Krasnozorensky District, Oryol Oblast, a village in Pokrovsky Selsoviet of Krasnozorensky District
- Berezovka, Pokrovsky District, Oryol Oblast, a selo in Berezovsky Selsoviet of Pokrovsky District
- Berezovka, Sverdlovsky District, Oryol Oblast, a village in Krasnoarmeysky Selsoviet of Sverdlovsky District
- Berezovka, Trosnyansky District, Oryol Oblast, a village in Nikolsky Selsoviet of Trosnyansky District

=== Penza Oblast ===
As of 2012, five rural localities in Penza Oblast bear this name:

- Berezovka, Kolyshleysky District, Penza Oblast, a selo in Berezovsky Selsoviet of Kolyshleysky District
- Berezovka, Mokshansky District, Penza Oblast, a settlement in Tsarevshchinsky Selsoviet of Mokshansky District
- Berezovka, Neverkinsky District, Penza Oblast, a selo in Berezovsky Selsoviet of Neverkinsky District
- Berezovka, Serdobsky District, Penza Oblast, a village in Peschansky Selsoviet of Serdobsky District
- Berezovka, Tamalinsky District, Penza Oblast, a selo in Ulyanovsky Selsoviet of Tamalinsky District

=== Perm Krai ===
As of 2012, eleven rural localities in Perm Krai bear this name:

- Berezovka, Chusovoy, Perm Krai, a village under the administrative jurisdiction of the town of krai significance of Chusovoy
- Beryozovka, Beryozovsky District, Perm Krai, a selo in Beryozovsky District
- Berezovka, Chernushinsky District, Perm Krai, a village in Chernushinsky District
- Berezovka, Ilyinsky District, Perm Krai, a village in Ilyinsky District
- Berezovka, Kudymkarsky District, Perm Krai, a settlement in Kudymkarsky District
- Berezovka (Lenskoye Rural Settlement), Kungursky District, Perm Krai, a village in Kungursky District; municipally, a part of Lenskoye Rural Settlement of that district
- Berezovka (Byrminskoye Rural Settlement), Kungursky District, Perm Krai, a village in Kungursky District; municipally, a part of Byrminskoye Rural Settlement of that district
- Berezovka, Okhansky District, Perm Krai, a village in Okhansky District
- Berezovka, Suksunsky District, Perm Krai, a village in Suksunsky District
- Berezovka, Usolsky District, Perm Krai, a selo in Usolsky District
- Berezovka, Yelovsky District, Perm Krai, a village in Yelovsky District

=== Primorsky Krai ===
As of 2012, two rural localities in Primorsky Krai bear this name:

- Berezovka, Chuguyevsky District, Primorsky Krai, a selo in Chuguyevsky District
- Berezovka, Khorolsky District, Primorsky Krai, a selo in Khorolsky District

=== Pskov Oblast ===
As of 2012, three rural localities in Pskov Oblast bear this name:

- Berezovka, Ostrovsky District, Pskov Oblast, a village in Ostrovsky District
- Berezovka, Usvyatsky District, Pskov Oblast, a village in Usvyatsky District
- Berezovka, Velikoluksky District, Pskov Oblast, a village in Velikoluksky District

=== Rostov Oblast ===
As of 2012, one rural locality in Rostov Oblast bears this name:

- Berezovka, Rostov Oblast, a selo in Sandatovskoye Rural Settlement of Salsky District

=== Ryazan Oblast ===
As of 2012, four rural localities in Ryazan Oblast bear this name:

- Berezovka, Putyatinsky District, Ryazan Oblast, a settlement in Bolsheyekaterinovsky Rural Okrug of Putyatinsky District
- Berezovka, Ryazansky District, Ryazan Oblast, a village in Yekimovsky Rural Okrug of Ryazansky District
- Berezovka (rural locality), Korovkinsky Rural Okrug, Sapozhkovsky District, Ryazan Oblast, a selo in Korovkinsky Rural Okrug of Sapozhkovsky District
- Berezovka (rural locality), Korovkinsky Rural Okrug, Sapozhkovsky District, Ryazan Oblast, a village in Korovkinsky Rural Okrug of Sapozhkovsky District

=== Sakha Republic ===
As of 2012, two rural localities in the Sakha Republic bear this name:

- Berezovka, Mirninsky District, Sakha Republic, a selo under the administrative jurisdiction of the settlement of Almazny in Mirninsky District
- Berezovka, Srednekolymsky District, Sakha Republic, a selo in Berezovsky Natsionalny (Kochevoy) Rural Okrug of Srednekolymsky District

=== Samara Oblast ===
As of 2012, seven rural localities in Samara Oblast bear this name:

- Berezovka, Bolsheglushitsky District, Samara Oblast, a selo in Bolsheglushitsky District
- Berezovka, Chelno-Vershinsky District, Samara Oblast, a settlement in Chelno-Vershinsky District
- Berezovka, Kinel-Cherkassky District, Samara Oblast, a selo in Kinel-Cherkassky District
- Berezovka, Pokhvistnevsky District, Samara Oblast, a settlement in Pokhvistnevsky District
- Berezovka, Shigonsky District, Samara Oblast, a selo in Shigonsky District
- Berezovka, Yelkhovsky District, Samara Oblast, a selo in Yelkhovsky District
- Berezovka, Yelkhovsky District, Samara Oblast, a village in Yelkhovsky District

=== Saratov Oblast ===
As of 2012, eight rural localities in Saratov Oblast bear this name:

- Berezovka, Balakovsky District, Saratov Oblast, a selo in Balakovsky District
- Berezovka, Balashovsky District, Saratov Oblast, a selo in Balashovsky District
- Berezovka, Bazarno-Karabulaksky District, Saratov Oblast, a selo in Bazarno-Karabulaksky District
- Berezovka, Engelssky District, Saratov Oblast, a selo in Engelssky District
- Berezovka, Marksovsky District, Saratov Oblast, a selo in Marksovsky District
- Berezovka, Petrovsky District, Saratov Oblast, a selo in Petrovsky District
- Berezovka, Rtishchevsky District, Saratov Oblast, a village in Rtishchevsky District
- Berezovka, Turkovsky District, Saratov Oblast, a village in Turkovsky District

=== Smolensk Oblast ===
As of 2012, two rural localities in Smolensk Oblast bear this name:

- Berezovka, Dorogobuzhsky District, Smolensk Oblast, a village in Knyashchinskoye Rural Settlement of Dorogobuzhsky District
- Berezovka, Dukhovshchinsky District, Smolensk Oblast, a village in Prechistenskoye Rural Settlement of Dukhovshchinsky District

=== Sverdlovsk Oblast ===
As of 2012, two rural localities in Sverdlovsk Oblast bear this name:

- Berezovka, Artinsky District, Sverdlovsk Oblast, a village in Berezovsky Selsoviet of Artinsky District
- Berezovka, Irbitsky District, Sverdlovsk Oblast, a village in Novgorodovsky Selsoviet of Irbitsky District

=== Tambov Oblast ===
As of 2012, nine rural localities in Tambov Oblast bear this name:

- Berezovka, Kirsanovsky District, Tambov Oblast, a village in Sokolovsky Selsoviet of Kirsanovsky District
- Berezovka, Mordovsky District, Tambov Oblast, a selo in Lavrovsky Selsoviet of Mordovsky District
- Berezovka, Petrovsky District, Tambov Oblast, a village in Plavitsky Selsoviet of Petrovsky District
- Berezovka, Rzhaksinsky District, Tambov Oblast, a village in Zolotovsky Selsoviet of Rzhaksinsky District
- Berezovka, Sampursky District, Tambov Oblast, a village in Satinsky Selsoviet of Sampursky District
- Berezovka, Sosnovsky District, Tambov Oblast, a selo in Degtyansky Selsoviet of Sosnovsky District
- Berezovka, Tokaryovsky District, Tambov Oblast, a selo in Abakumovsky Selsoviet of Tokaryovsky District
- Berezovka, Umyotsky District, Tambov Oblast, a selo in Berezovsky Selsoviet of Umyotsky District
- Berezovka, Uvarovsky District, Tambov Oblast, a selo in Berezovsky Selsoviet of Uvarovsky District

=== Republic of Tatarstan ===
As of 2012, eight rural localities in the Republic of Tatarstan bear this name:

- Berezovka, Alexeyevsky District, Republic of Tatarstan, a village in Alexeyevsky District
- Berezovka, Almetyevsky District, Republic of Tatarstan, a settlement in Almetyevsky District
- Berezovka, Almetyevsky District, Republic of Tatarstan, a village in Almetyevsky District
- Berezovka, Bugulminsky District, Republic of Tatarstan, a settlement in Bugulminsky District
- Berezovka, Chistopolsky District, Republic of Tatarstan, a village in Chistopolsky District
- Berezovka, Laishevsky District, Republic of Tatarstan, a selo in Laishevsky District
- Berezovka, Nurlatsky District, Republic of Tatarstan, a settlement in Nurlatsky District
- Berezovka, Vysokogorsky District, Republic of Tatarstan, a settlement in Vysokogorsky District

=== Tomsk Oblast ===
As of 2012, one rural locality in Tomsk Oblast bears this name:

- Berezovka, Tomsk Oblast, a village in Pervomaysky District

=== Tula Oblast ===
As of 2012, ten rural localities in Tula Oblast bear this name:

- Berezovka, Aleksinsky District, Tula Oblast, a village in Spas-Koninsky Rural Okrug of Aleksinsky District
- Berezovka, Krasnobuytsky Rural Okrug, Bogoroditsky District, Tula Oblast, a selo in Krasnobuytsky Rural Okrug of Bogoroditsky District
- Berezovka, Novopokrovsky Rural Okrug, Bogoroditsky District, Tula Oblast, a village in Novopokrovsky Rural Okrug of Bogoroditsky District
- Berezovka, Kamensky District, Tula Oblast, a village in Yazykovsky Rural Okrug of Kamensky District
- Berezovka, Kimovsky District, Tula Oblast, a village in Tabolsky Rural Okrug of Kimovsky District
- Berezovka, Kireyevsky District, Tula Oblast, a village in Novoselsky Rural Okrug of Kireyevsky District
- Berezovka, Leninsky District, Tula Oblast, a village in Prilepsky Rural Okrug of Leninsky District
- Berezovka, Novomoskovsky District, Tula Oblast, a village in Gremyachevsky Rural Okrug of Novomoskovsky District
- Berezovka, Tyoplo-Ogaryovsky District, Tula Oblast, a village in Bolshe-Ogarevsky Rural Okrug of Tyoplo-Ogaryovsky District
- Berezovka, Zaoksky District, Tula Oblast, a village in Simonovsky Rural Okrug of Zaoksky District

=== Tver Oblast ===
As of 2012, four rural localities in Tver Oblast bear this name:

- Berezovka, Likhoslavlsky District, Tver Oblast, a village in Tolmachevskoye Rural Settlement of Likhoslavlsky District
- Berezovka, Maksatikhinsky District, Tver Oblast, a village in Seletskoye Rural Settlement of Maksatikhinsky District
- Berezovka, Nelidovsky District, Tver Oblast, a village in Novoselkovskoye Rural Settlement of Nelidovsky District
- Berezovka, Zharkovsky District, Tver Oblast, a village in Novoselkovskoye Rural Settlement of Zharkovsky District

=== Tyumen Oblast ===
As of 2012, three rural localities in Tyumen Oblast bear this name:

- Berezovka, Nizhnetavdinsky District, Tyumen Oblast, a settlement in Berezovsky Rural Okrug of Nizhnetavdinsky District
- Berezovka, Uvatsky District, Tyumen Oblast, a village in Ivanovsky Rural Okrug of Uvatsky District
- Berezovka, Vagaysky District, Tyumen Oblast, a village in Fateyevsky Rural Okrug of Vagaysky District

=== Udmurt Republic ===
As of 2012, three rural localities in the Udmurt Republic bear this name:

- Berezovka, Debyossky District, Udmurt Republic, a village in Tolyensky Selsoviet of Debyossky District
- Berezovka, Syumsinsky District, Udmurt Republic, a village in Gurinsky Selsoviet of Syumsinsky District
- Berezovka, Uvinsky District, Udmurt Republic, a village in Nylginsky Selsoviet of Uvinsky District

=== Ulyanovsk Oblast ===
As of 2012, four rural localities in Ulyanovsk Oblast bear this name:

- Berezovka, Maynsky District, Ulyanovsk Oblast, a selo under the administrative jurisdiction of Maynsky Settlement Okrug in Maynsky District
- Berezovka, Melekessky District, Ulyanovsk Oblast, a settlement under the administrative jurisdiction of Mullovsky Settlement Okrug in Melekessky District
- Berezovka, Staromaynsky District, Ulyanovsk Oblast, a selo in Zhedyayevsky Rural Okrug of Staromaynsky District
- Berezovka, Veshkaymsky District, Ulyanovsk Oblast, a selo under the administrative jurisdiction of Chufarovsky Settlement Okrug in Veshkaymsky District

=== Vladimir Oblast ===
As of 2012, one rural locality in Vladimir Oblast bears this name:

- Berezovka, Vladimir Oblast, a village in Muromsky District

=== Volgograd Oblast ===
As of 2012, three rural localities in Volgograd Oblast bear this name:

- Berezovka, Rudnyansky District, Volgograd Oblast, a selo in Lopukhovsky Selsoviet of Rudnyansky District
- Berezovka, Berezovsky Selsoviet, Yelansky District, Volgograd Oblast, a selo in Berezovsky Selsoviet of Yelansky District
- Berezovka, Rassvetovsky Selsoviet, Yelansky District, Volgograd Oblast, a selo in Rassvetovsky Selsoviet of Yelansky District

=== Vologda Oblast ===
As of 2012, three rural localities in Vologda Oblast bear this name:

- Berezovka, Babushkinsky District, Vologda Oblast, a settlement in Timanovsky Selsoviet of Babushkinsky District
- Berezovka, Velikoustyugsky District, Vologda Oblast, a village in Teplogorsky Selsoviet of Velikoustyugsky District
- Berezovka, Vologodsky District, Vologda Oblast, a village in Veprevsky Selsoviet of Vologodsky District

=== Voronezh Oblast ===
As of 2012, five rural localities in Voronezh Oblast bear this name:

- Berezovka, Anninsky District, Voronezh Oblast, a selo in Berezovskoye Rural Settlement of Anninsky District
- Berezovka, Novokhopyorsky District, Voronezh Oblast, a settlement in Kolenovskoye Rural Settlement of Novokhopyorsky District
- Berezovka, Semiluksky District, Voronezh Oblast, a selo in Novosilskoye Rural Settlement of Semiluksky District
- Berezovka, Talovsky District, Voronezh Oblast, a settlement in Nizhnekamenskoye Rural Settlement of Talovsky District
- Berezovka, Vorobyovsky District, Voronezh Oblast, a selo in Berezovskoye Rural Settlement of Vorobyovsky District

== Alternative names ==
- Berezovka, alternative name of Berezovo, a selo in Soltonsky Selsoviet of Soltonsky District in Altai Krai; 52°53′N 86°19′E
- Berezovka, alternative name of Berezovskoye, a selo in Berezovskaya Rural Administration of Yashaltinsky District in the Republic of Kalmykia; 46°16′N 42°24′E
- Berezovka, alternative name of Beryozovsky, a town in Kemerovo Oblast; 55°37′N 86°15′E
- Berezovka, alternative name of Berezovo, a selo in Berezovskaya Rural Territory of Kemerovsky District in Kemerovo Oblast; 55°14′N 86°15′E
- Berezovka, alternative name of Berezovo, a selo in Kostenkovskaya Rural Territory of Novokuznetsky District in Kemerovo Oblast; 53°42′N 86°48′E
- Berezovka, alternative name of Berezovo, a selo in Padunskaya Rural Territory of Promyshlennovsky District in Kemerovo Oblast; 55°10′N 85°3′E
- Berezovka, alternative name of Berezovo, a village in Bayaraksky Selsoviet of Belozersky District in Kurgan Oblast; 56°2′N 65°29′E

== See also ==
- Staraya Beryozovka, several rural localities in Russia
