= Charyshsky =

Charyshsky (Russian: Чарышский; masculine), Charyshskaya (Чарышская; feminine), or Charyshskoye (Чарышское; neuter) is the name of three rural localities in Altai Krai, Russia:

- Charyshsky (rural locality), a settlement in Krasnoshchyokovsky District
- Charyshkoye, Charyshsky District, Altai Krai, a selo in Charyshsky District
- Charyshkoye, Ust-Kalmansky District, Altai Krai, a selo in Ust-Kalmansky District
