= Krasnoshchyokovo =

Krasnoshchyokovo (Russian: Краснощёково) is the name of two rural localities in Russia:

- Krasnoshchyokovo, Altai Krai, a selo in Krasnoshchyokovsky District of Altai Krai
- Krasnoshchyokovo, Orenburg Oblast, a settlement in Kuvandyksky District of Orenburg Oblast
