= Novoshipunovo =

Novoshipunovo Новошипуново
- Village
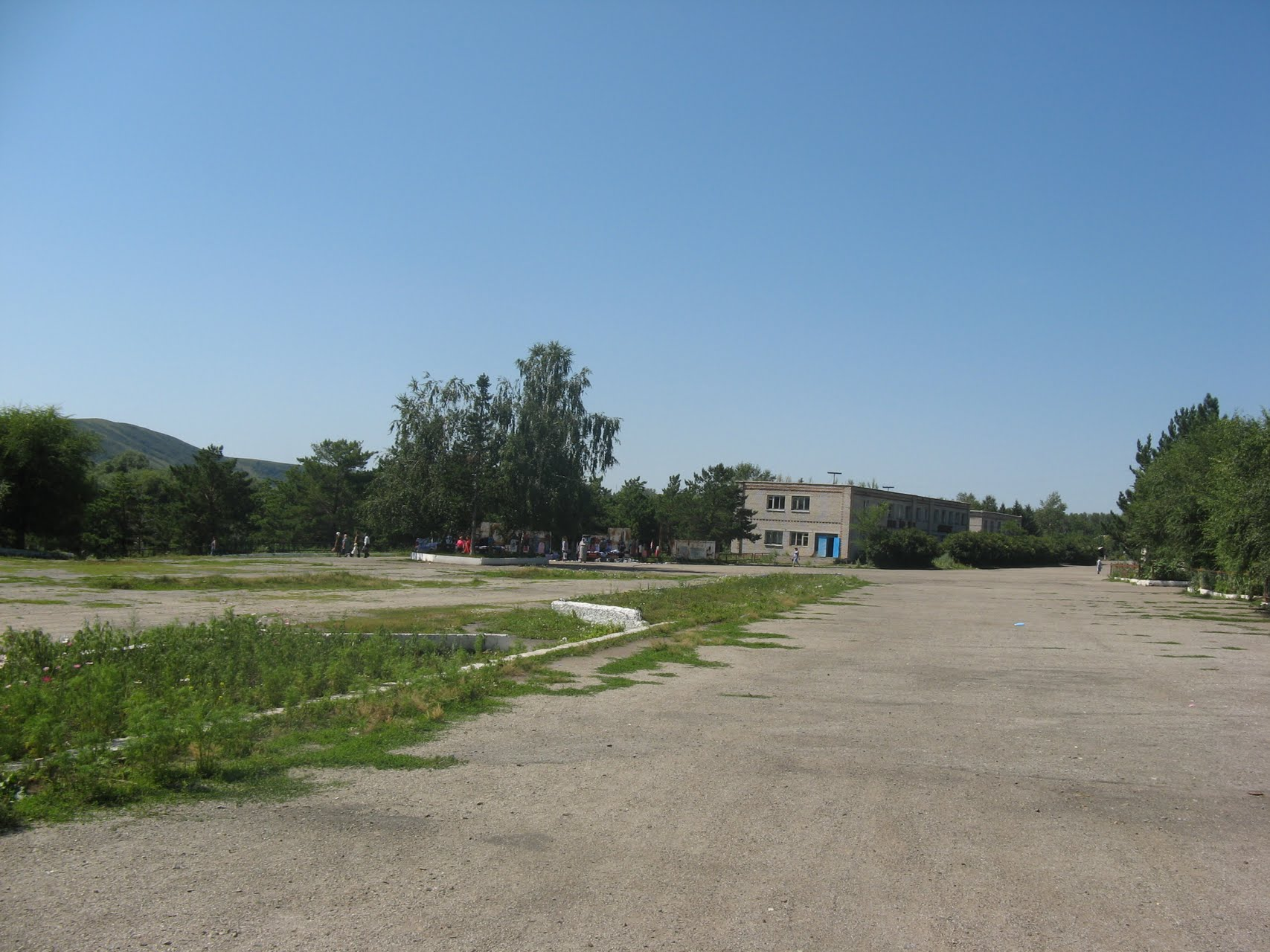

- Location within Altai Krai Location within Russia
- Coordinates: 51°41′N 83°15′E
- Country: Russia
- Region: Altai Krai
- District: Krasnoshchyokovsky District
- Time zone: UTC+7:00

Novoshipunovo (Russian: Новошипуново) is a rural locality (a selo) and the administrative center of Novoshipunovsky Selsoviet, Krasnoshchyokovsky District, Altai Krai, Russia. The population was 1,177 as of 2016. There are 13 streets.

== Geography ==
Novoshipunovo is located 58 km east of Krasnoshchyokovo (the district's administrative centre) by road. Maralikha is the nearest rural locality.
