= Tulata, Altai Krai =

Tulata Тулата
- Selo
- Location within Altai Krai Location within Russia
- Coordinates: 51°18′N 83°25′E
- Country: Russia
- Region: Altai Krai
- District: Charyshsky District
- Time zone: UTC+7:00

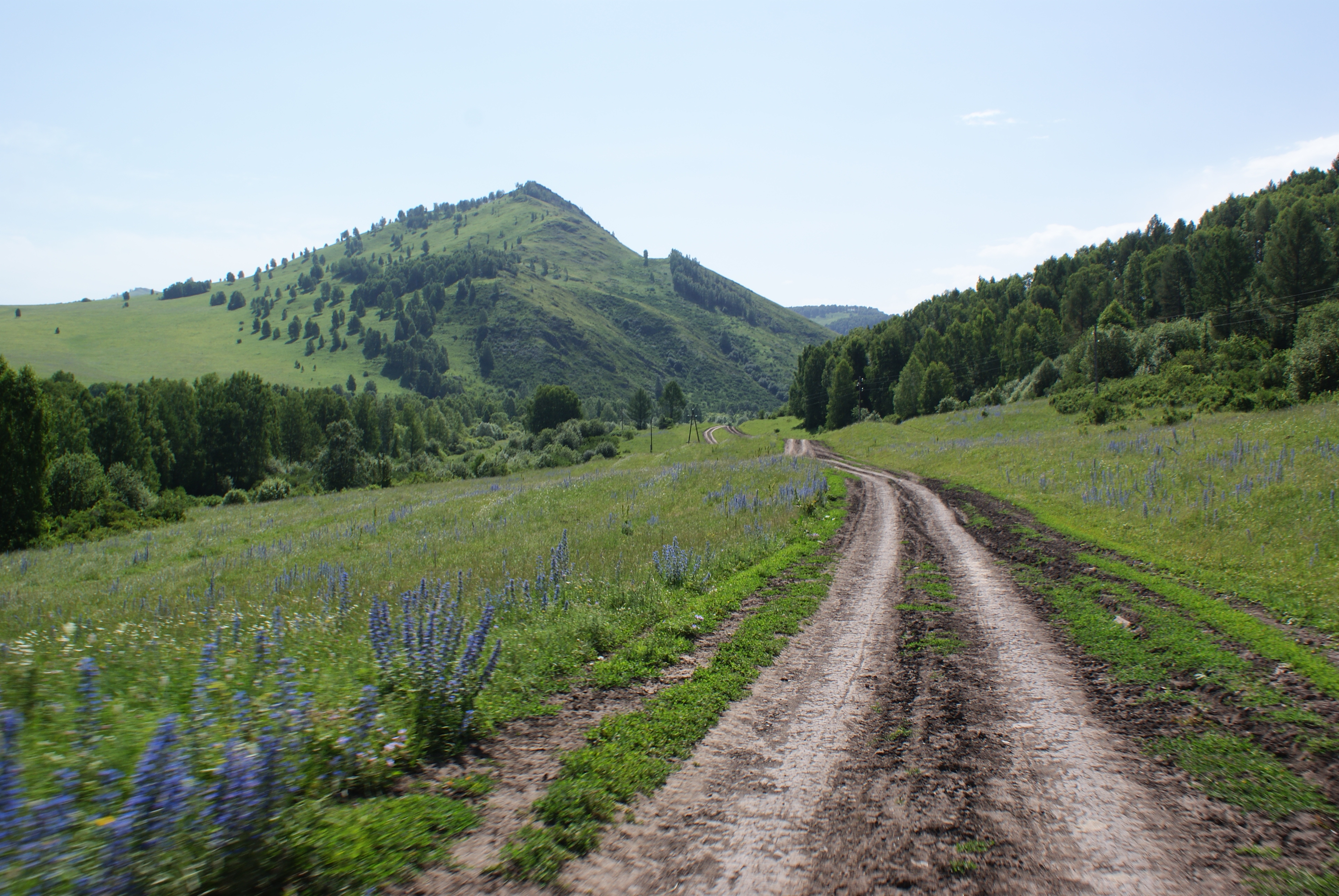
A dirt road between Tulata and Ust-Ionysh in Altai Krai, Russia

Tulata (Russian: Тулата) is a rural locality (a selo) and the administrative center of Tulatinsky Selsoviet, Charyshsky District, Altai Krai, Russia. The population was 728 as of 2013. There are 28 streets.

== Geography ==
Tulata is located 20 km southwest of Charyshskoye (the district's administrative centre) by road. Krasny Partizan is the nearest rural locality.
