= Mayak, Altai Krai =

Mayak Маяк
- Selo
- Location within Altai Krai Location within Russia
- Coordinates: 51°36′N 83°26′E
- Country: Russia
- Region: Altai Krai
- District: Charyshsky District
- Time zone: UTC+7:00

Mayak (Russian: Маяк) is a rural locality (a selo) and the administrative center of Mayaksky Selsoviet, Charyshsky District, Altai Krai, Russia. The population was 455 as of 2013. It was founded in 1890. There are 8 streets.

== Geography ==
Mayak is located 49 km north of Charyshskoye (the district's administrative centre) by road. Pervomaysky is the nearest rural locality.
