= Malaya Suyetka =

Malaya Suyetka Малая Суетка
- Settlement
- Location within Altai Krai Location within Russia
- Coordinates: 51°36′N 82°50′E
- Country: Russia
- Region: Altai Krai
- District: Krasnoshchyokovsky District
- Time zone: UTC+7:00

Malaya Suyetka (Russian: Малая Суетка) is a rural locality (a settlement) in Krasnoshchyokovsky Selsoviet, Krasnoshchyokovsky District, Altai Krai, Russia. The population was 109 as of 2013.

== Geography ==
Malaya Suyetka is located 11 km southeast of Krasnoshchyokovo (the district's administrative centre) by road. Maralikha is the nearest rural locality.
