= Shigony =

Shigony (Russian: Шигоны) may refer to any of the following rural localities in Russia:

- Shigony, a rural village in the Shigonsky District of Samara Oblast
- a railway station near said village
