= Sentelek =

Sentelek Сентелек
- Selo
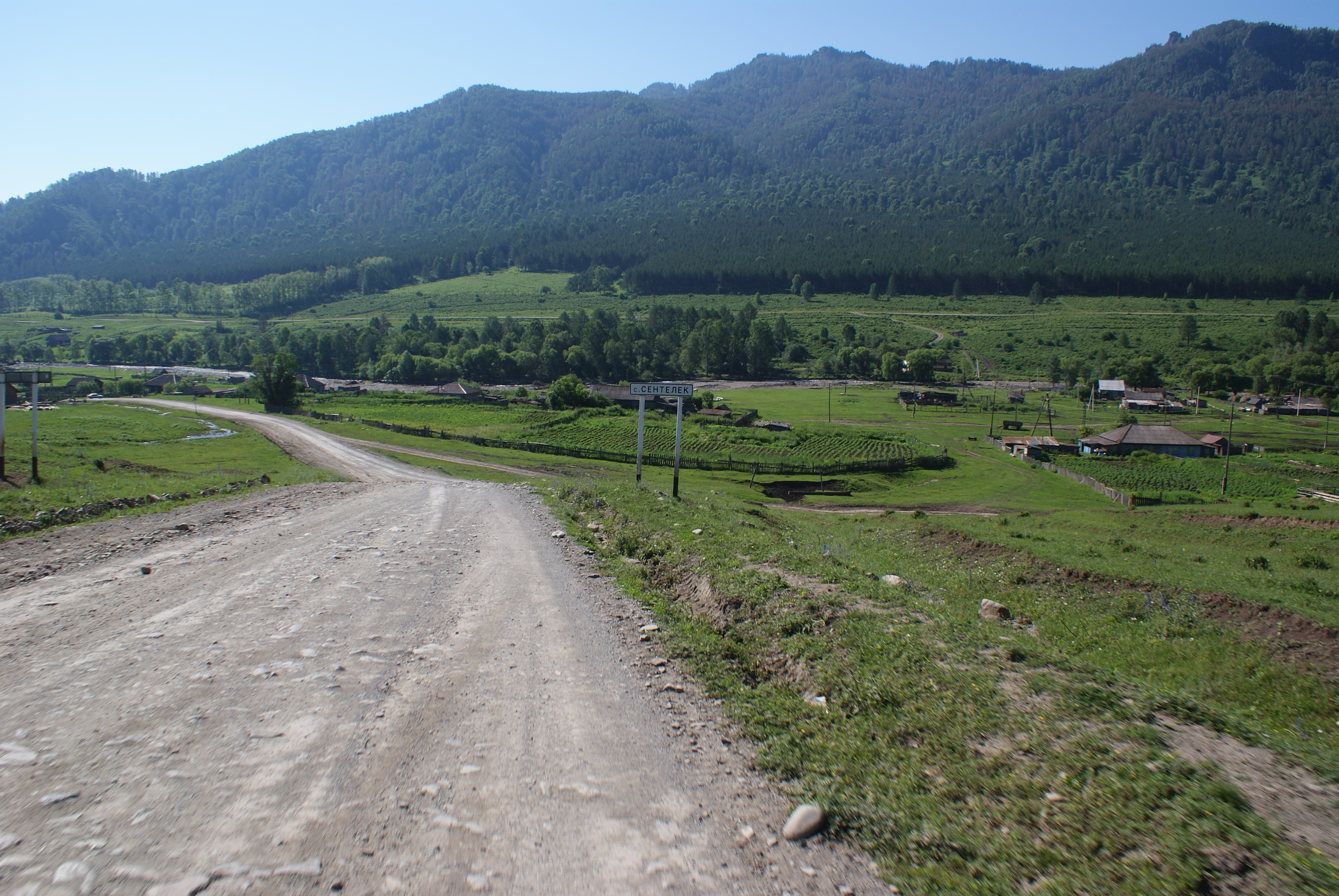
- Village of Sentelek

- Location within Altai Krai Location within Russia
- Coordinates: 51°12′N 83°45′E
- Country: Russia
- Region: Altai Krai
- District: Charyshsky District
- Time zone: UTC+7:00

Sentelek (Russian: Сентелек) is a rural locality (a selo) in Senteleksky Selsoviet, Charyshsky District, Altai Krai, Russia. The population was 805 as of 2013. There are 11 streets.

== Geography ==
Sentelek is located 34 km south of Charyshskoye (the district's administrative centre) by road. Pokrovka is the nearest rural locality.
