= Negino =

Negino Негино
- Selo
- Location within Bryansk Oblast Location within Russia
- Coordinates: 52°18′N 34°12′E
- Country: Russia
- Region: Bryansk Oblast
- District: Suzemsky District
- Time zone: UTC+3:00

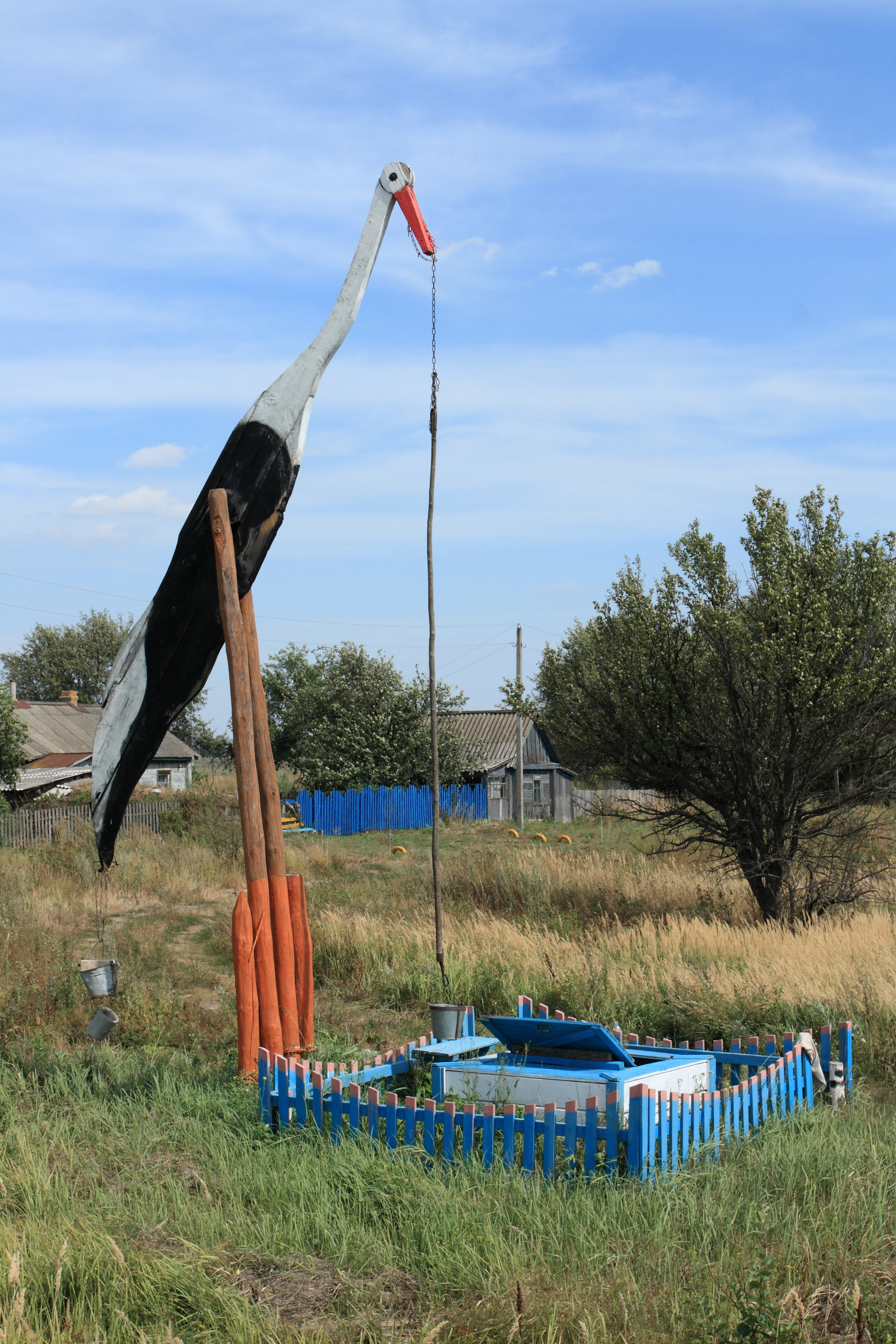
A well located in Negino

Negino (Russian: Негино) is a rural locality (a selo) in Suzemsky District, Bryansk Oblast, Russia. The population was 412 as of 2013. There are 8 streets.

== Geography ==
Negino is located 10 km east of Suzemka (the district's administrative centre) by road. Nevdolsk is the nearest rural locality.
