= Nerussa =

Nerussa Нерусса
- Station
- Location within Bryansk Oblast Location within Russia
- Coordinates: 52°25′N 34°08′E
- Country: Russia
- Region: Bryansk Oblast
- District: Suzemsky District
- Time zone: UTC+3:00

Nerussa (Russian: Нерусса) is a rural locality (a station) in Suzemsky District, Bryansk Oblast, Russia. The population was 161 as of 2010. There are 4 streets.

== Geography ==
Nerussa is located 17 km north of Suzemka (the district's administrative centre) by road. Chelyuskin is the nearest rural locality.
