= Zyornovo =

Zyornovo Зёрново
- Selo
- Location within Bryansk Oblast Location within Russia
- Coordinates: 52°11′N 34°05′E
- Country: Russia
- Region: Bryansk Oblast
- District: Suzemsky District
- Time zone: UTC+3:00

Zyornovo (Russian: Зёрново) is a rural locality (a selo) in Suzemsky District, Bryansk Oblast, Russia. The population was 436 as of 2013. There are 8 streets.

== Geography ==
Zyornovo is located 21 km south of Suzemka (the district's administrative centre) by road. Seredina-Buda is the nearest rural locality.
