= Chineta =

Chineta Чинета
- Selo
- Location within Altai Krai Location within Russia
- Coordinates: 51°20′N 83°03′E
- Country: Russia
- Region: Altai Krai
- District: Krasnoshchyokovsky District
- Time zone: UTC+7:00

Chineta (Russian: Чинета) is a rural locality (a selo) and the administrative center of Chinetinsky Selsoviet, Krasnoshchyokovsky District, Altai Krai, Russia. The population was 524 as of 2013. There are 10 streets.

== Geography ==
Chineta is located 69 km southeast of Krasnoshchyokovo (the district's administrative centre) by road. Ust-Beloye is the nearest rural locality.
