= Berezovka, Krasnoshchyokovsky District, Altai Krai =

Berezovka Берёзовка
- selo
- Location within Altai Krai Location within Russia
- Coordinates: 51°50′N 82°57′E
- Country: Russia
- Region: Altai Krai
- District: Krasnoshchyokovsky District
- Time zone: UTC+7:00

Berezovka (Russian: Берёзовка) is a rural locality (a selo) and the administrative center of Beryozovsky Selsoviet of Krasnoshchyokovsky District, Altai Krai, Russia. The population was 1,318 as of 2016.

== Geography ==
Berezovka is located 36 km north of Krasnoshchyokovo (the district's administrative centre) by road. Verkh-Kamyshenka is the nearest rural locality.
