= Charyshsky (rural locality) =

Charyshsky Чарышский
- Settlement
- Location within Altai Krai Location within Russia
- Coordinates: 51°41′N 82°26′E
- Country: Russia
- Region: Altai Krai
- District: Krasnoshchyokovsky District
- Time zone: UTC+7:00

Charyshsky (Russian: Чарышский) is a rural locality (a settlement) in Krasnoshchyokovsky Selsoviet, Krasnoshchyokovsky District, Altai Krai, Russia. The population was 121 as of 2013.

== Geography ==
Charyshsky is located 12 km northwest of Krasnoshchyokovo (the district's administrative centre) by road. Podzaymishche is the nearest rural locality.
