= Volzhsky Utyos =

Volzhsky Utyos Волжский Утес
- Settlement
- Location within Samara Oblast
- Coordinates: 53°22′59″N 49°05′59″E
- Country: Russia
- Federal subject: Samara Oblast
- District: Shigonsky District
- Municipality: Volzhsky Utyos Rural Settlement

Volzhsky Utyos (Russian: Волжский Утес) is a rural locality (a settlement) in Shigonsky District of Samara Oblast, Russia. Population: 1,913 (2010 census); The settlement is the administrative center of Volzhsky Utyos Rural Settlement, one of the municipal formations of Shigonsky District. It was formed around the sanatorium of the same name.
