= Volzhsky Utyos Rural Settlement =

Human settlement in Shigonsky District, Samara Oblast, Russia

Volzhsky Utyos Rural Settlement (Russian: Сельское поселение Волжский Утёс) is an administrative and municipal division (a rural settlement) of Shigonsky District of Samara Oblast, Russia. Its administrative center is the rural locality (a settlement) of Volzhsky Utyos. Population: 2,303 (2010 Census);

== Settlements ==
- Berezovka
- Komarovka
- Volzhsky Utyos (administrative center)
