= Berezovka =

Berezovka or Beryozovka (Russian: Берёзовка) may refer to:

- Beryozovka, Russia (Berezovka), several inhabited localities in Russia
- Byarozawka (Beryozovka), a town in Grodno Oblast, Belarus
- Berezivka (Beryozovka), a city in Odesa Oblast, Ukraine
- Berezovka (airport), an air base in Murmansk Oblast, Russia
- Beryozovka (Perm Krai), a tributary of Lake Chusovskoye in Perm Krai, Russia
- Beryozovka (Kolyma), a tributary of the Kolyma in Sakha Republic, Russia
