= Komarovka, Samara Oblast =

Komarovka Комаровка
- Village
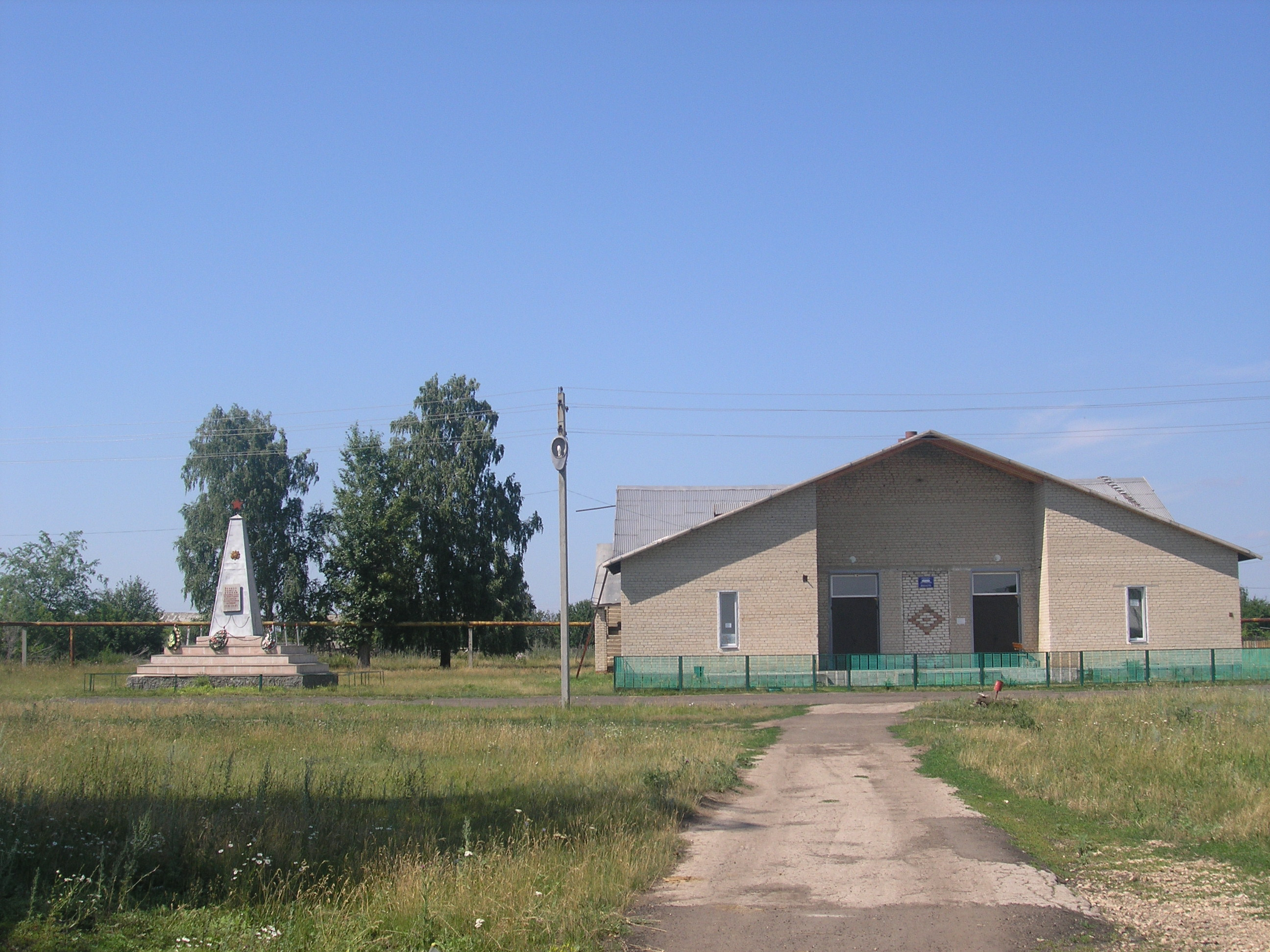

- Location within Samara Oblast
- Coordinates: 53°18′19″N 49°08′12″E
- Country: Russia
- Federal subject: Samara Oblast
- District: Shigonsky District
- Municipality: Volzhsky Utyos Rural Settlement

Komarovka (Russian: Комаровка) is a rural locality (a village) in Volzhsky Utyos Rural Settlement of Shigonsky District of Samara Oblast, Russia. Population: 350 (2010 census);
