= Berezovka, Charyshsky District, Altai Krai =

Berezovka Берёзовка
- Selo
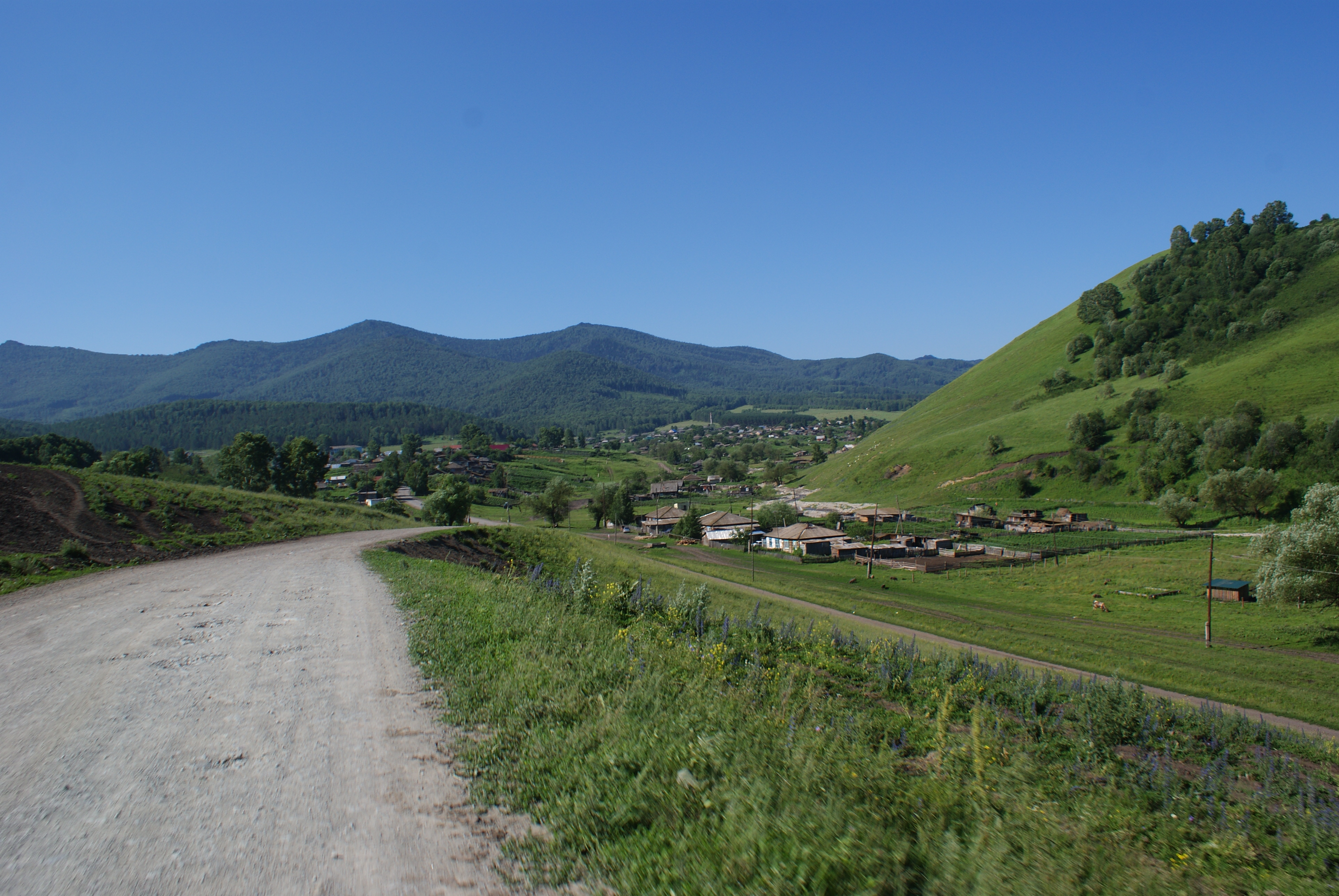
- View of the village of Berezovka

- Location within Altai Krai Location within Russia
- Coordinates: 51°16′N 83°36′E
- Country: Russia
- Region: Altai Krai
- District: Charyshsky District
- Time zone: UTC+7:00

Berezovka (Russian: Берёзовка) is a rural locality (a selo) and the administrative center of Beryozovsky Selsoviet, Charyshsky District, Altai Krai, Russia. The population was 722 as of 2013. It was founded in 1776. There are 13 streets.

== Geography ==
Berezovka is located 18 km south of Charyshskoye (the district's administrative centre) by road. Komendantka is the nearest rural locality.
