= Berezovka, Suzemsky District, Bryansk Oblast =

Berezovka Берёзовка
- Village
- Location within Bryansk Oblast Location within Russia
- Coordinates: 52°26′N 34°06′E
- Country: Russia
- Region: Bryansk Oblast
- District: Suzemsky District
- Time zone: UTC+3:00

Berezovka (Russian: Берёзовка) is a rural locality (a village) in Suzemsky District, Bryansk Oblast, Russia. The population was 76 as of 2010. There are 3 streets.

== Geography ==
Berezovka is located 18 km north of Suzemka (the district's administrative centre) by road. Stuzhenka is the nearest rural locality.
