= Beloglazovo =

Village in Altai Krai, Russia

Beloglazovo Белоглазово
- Village
- Location within Altai Krai Location within Russia
- Coordinates: 52°06′N 82°34′E
- Country: Russia
- Region: Altai Krai
- District: Shipunovsky District
- Time zone: UTC+7:00 (CET)

Beloglazovo (also referred to as Byeloglazovo) is a village located in southwestern Siberia in Shipunovsky District, Altai Krai, Russia. It is located on the Charysh River. There is 12 streets.
