= Berezovka, Shigonsky District, Samara Oblast =

Berezovka Березовка
- Village
- Location within Samara Oblast
- Coordinates: 53°23′22″N 49°12′50″E
- Country: Russia
- Federal subject: Samara Oblast
- District: Shigonsky District
- Municipality: Volzhsky Utyos Rural Settlement

Berezovka (Russian: Березовка) is a rural locality (a village) in Volzhsky Utyos Rural Settlement of Shigonsky District of Samara Oblast, Russia. Population: 40 (2010 census);
