= Berezovka (air base) =

Former military airfield in Murmansk Oblast, Russia

Berezovka
- Lake Umbozero, Murmansk Oblast in Russia
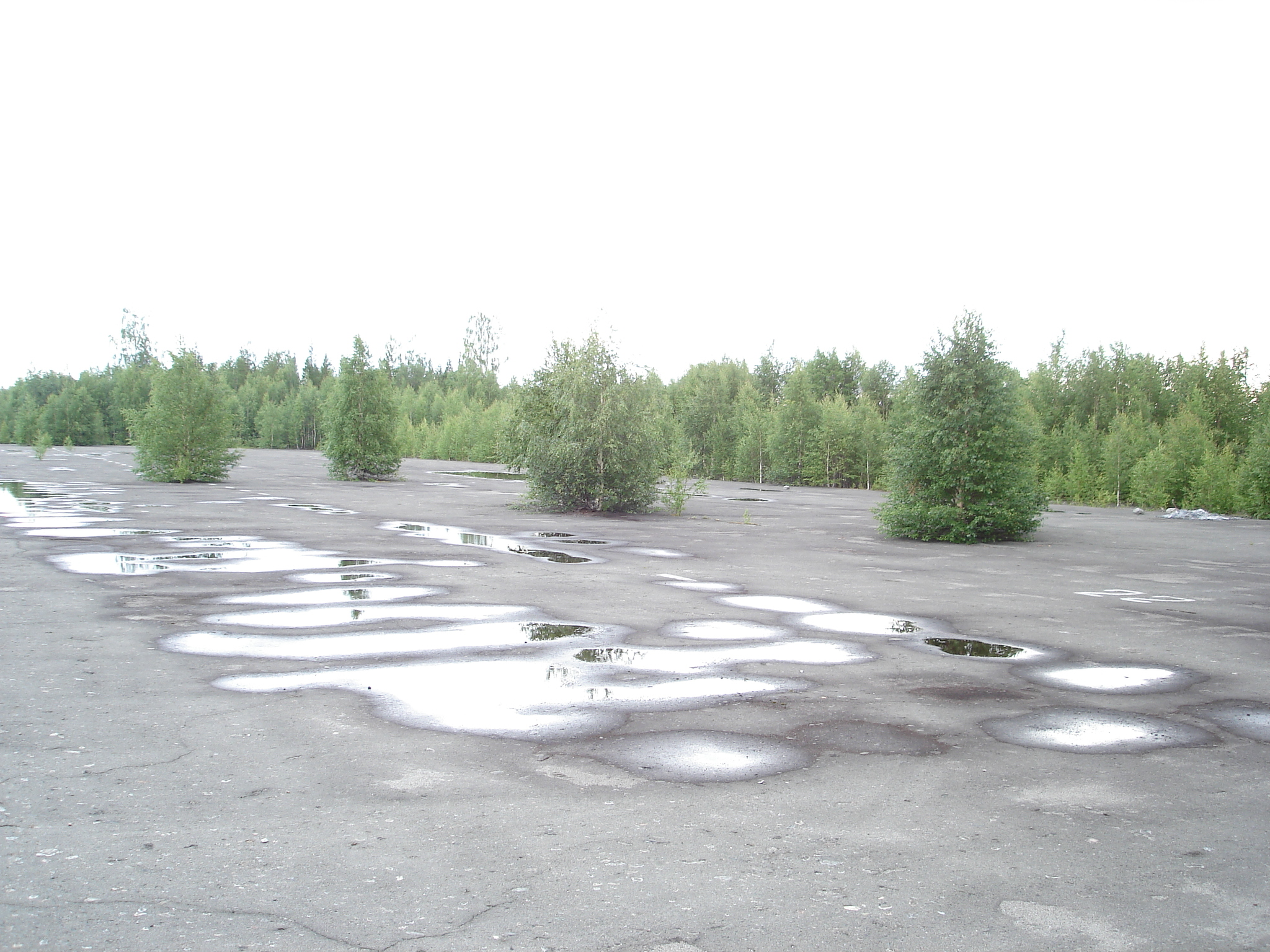

Site information
- Type: Air Base
- Owner: Ministry of Defence
- Operator: Soviet Air Forces

Location
- Shown within Murmansk Oblast Berezovka (Russia)
- Coordinates: 67°22′48″N 034°13′0″E

Site history
- In use: -1991

Airfield information
- Elevation: 130 metres (427 ft) AMSL
Runways
Direction	Length and surface
00/00	3,500 metres (11,483 ft) Concrete

Berezovka Air Base (also Umbozero South) is a former air base in Murmansk Oblast, Russia located 13 km southwest of Umbozero. It contained few facilities and no buildings identifiable on satellite imagery, and was likely intended for use as a forward bomber staging base during the height of the Cold War.

The base is located 10 miles (16 km) south of Lake Umbozero and 7.4 miles (11.9 km) south west of Oktyabrsky, Murmansk Oblast.
