= Staraya Beryozovka =

Staraya Beryozovka (Russian: Старая Берёзовка) is the name of several rural localities in Russia:

- Staraya Beryozovka, Smolensk Oblast, a village in Roslavlsky District of Smolensk Oblast
- Staraya Beryozovka, Tomsk Oblast, a selo in Kargasoksky District of Tomsk Oblast
- Staraya Beryozovka, name of several other rural localities

== See also ==
- Beryozovka (disambiguation)
