= Charysh =

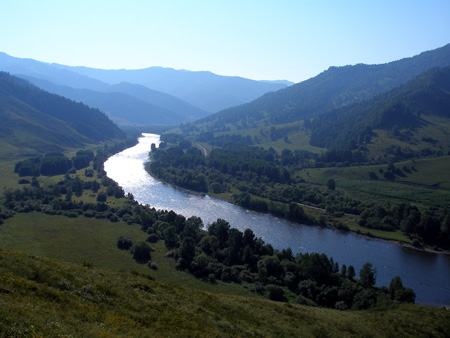

Location
- Country: Russia

Physical characteristics
- Mouth: Ob
  - coordinates: 52.3611°N 83.7222°E
- Length: 547 km (340 mi)
- Basin size: 22,200 km^{2} (8,600 sq mi)

Basin features
- Progression: Ob→ Kara Sea

The Charysh (Russian: Чарыш or Чарас; Altay: Чарас-Суу or Чорос, romanized: Çaras-Sû or Çoros, from the ethnonym 'Choros') is a river in south-western Siberia in Russia, flowing into the left bank of the Ob. It is 547 kilometres (340 mi) long, and has a drainage basin of 22,200 square kilometres (8,600 sq mi). Its source is in the Korgon mountains in the Altai Republic, then descends into the pre-altaic depression in the Altai Krai, and it flows into the Ob 100 kilometres (62 mi) upstream of the regional capital of Barnaul. Its largest tributaries are the Inya, Belaya and Loktevka from the left, and the Maralikha from the right. The main settlements on the Charysh are Ust-Kan, Charyshskoye, Krasnoshchyokovo, Ust-Kalmanka and Ust-Charyshskaya Pristan.

Beloglazovo is a village located on the Charysh.
