= Mayak Shangina =

Highest mountain in Altai Krai

- Маяк Шангина
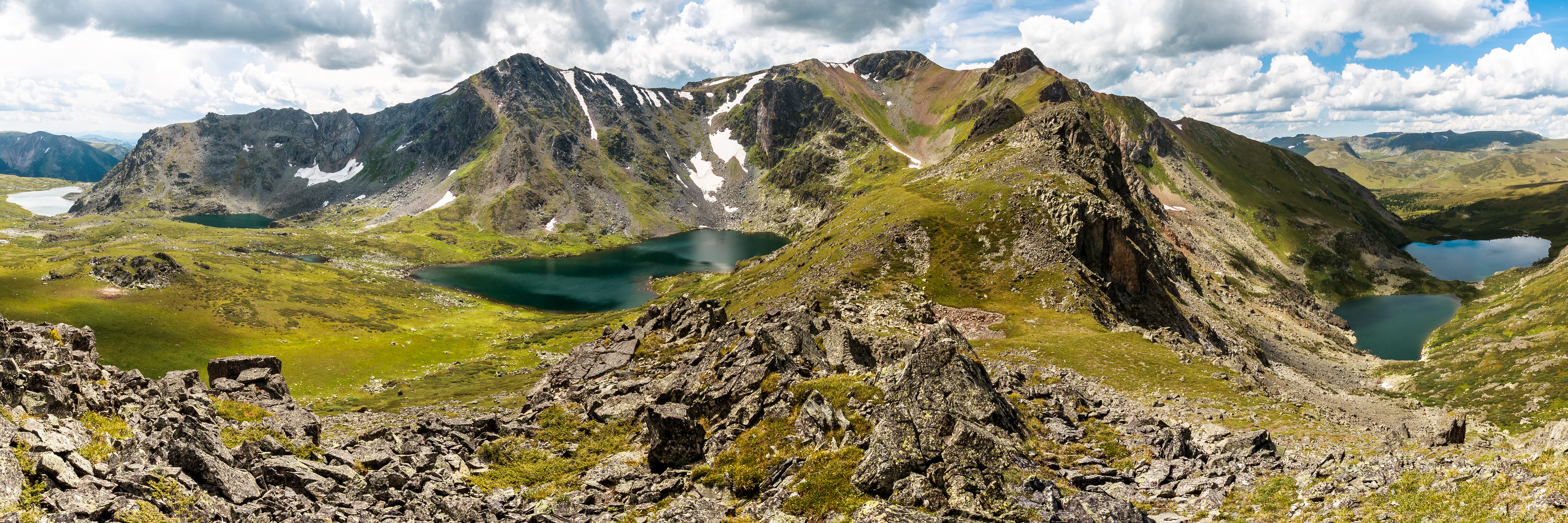
- View of the peak area

Highest point
- Elevation: 2,490 m (8,170 ft)
- Prominence: 892 m (2,927 ft)
- Coordinates: 50°46′38″N 84°32′04″E

Geography
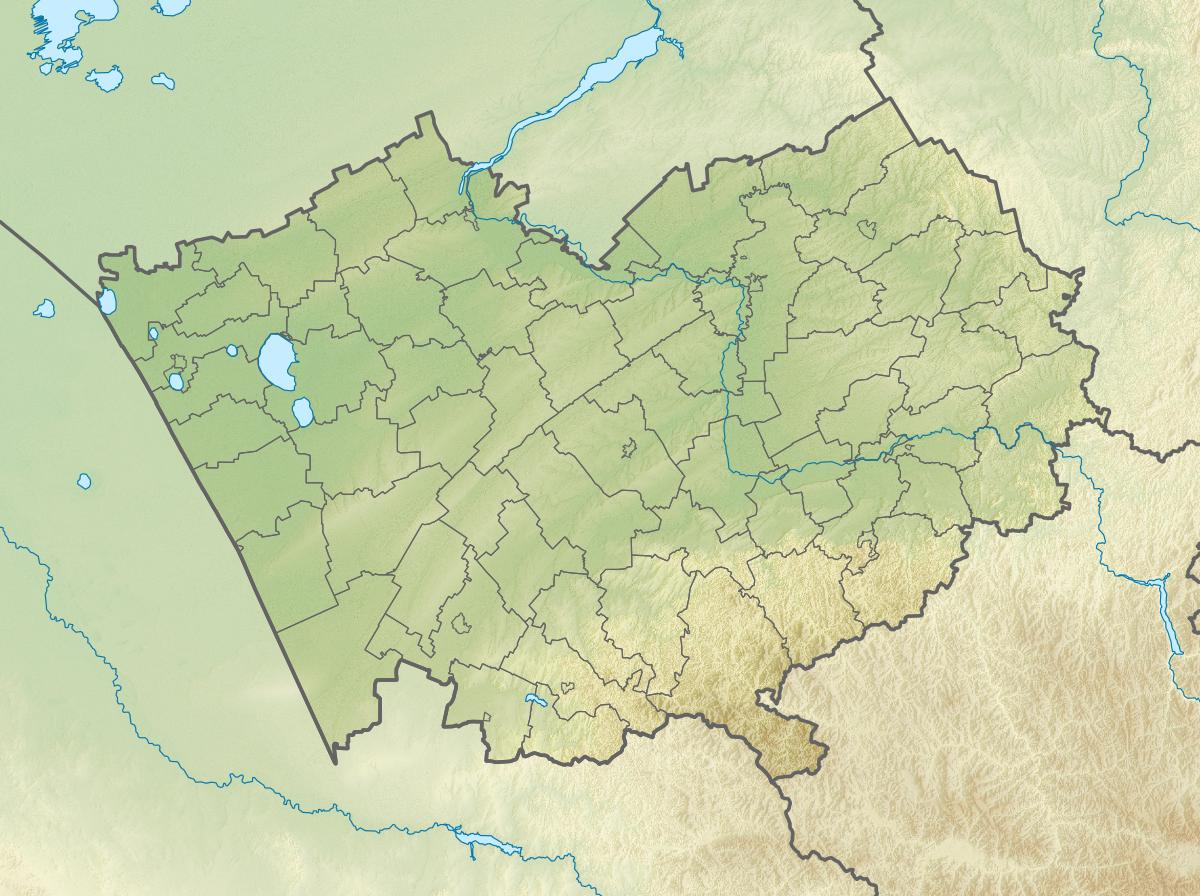
- Location within Altai Krai
- Location: Altai Krai, Russia
- Parent range: Korgon Range; Altai Mountains; South Siberian Mountains

Mayak Shangina (Russian: Маяк Шангина) is a mountain in Altai Krai, Russia. At 2,490 metres (8,170 ft) it is the highest point of Altai Krai.

The summit was formerly unnamed. The choosing of the name followed a 2011 initiative of local paper Altayskaya Pravda journalist Anatoly Muravlev, who came up with the idea to give the peak an official name on the occasion of the 75th anniversary of the establishment of the Altai Territory. The name Mayak Shangina honors ethnographer, geologist and botanist Peter Shangin (1741 - 1816) and it was ratified and officially adopted in 2013.

== Description ==
Mayak Shangina is the highest summit in the Korgon Range, part of the Altai Mountains, South Siberian System. It rises at the southern end of the Altai Krai, in an area of the Charyshsky District that borders with the Ust-Kansky District of the Altai Republic.

== See also ==
- List of highest points of Russian federal subjects
- List of mountains and hills of Russia
