= Berezovka, Khabarsky District, Altai Krai =

Berezovka Берёзовка
- Settlement
- Location within Altai Krai Location within Russia
- Coordinates: 53°28′N 79°32′E
- Country: Russia
- Region: Altai Krai
- District: Khabarsky District
- Time zone: UTC+7:00

Berezovka (Russian: Берёзовка) is a rural locality (a settlement) in Martovsky Selsoviet, Khabarsky District, Altai Krai, Russia. The population was 42 as of 2013. It was founded in 1970. There are 2 streets.

== Geography ==
Berezovka is located 19 km south of Khabary (the district's administrative centre) by road. Martovka is the nearest rural locality.
