= Nemsky District =

Nemsky District Немский район (Russian)
- District
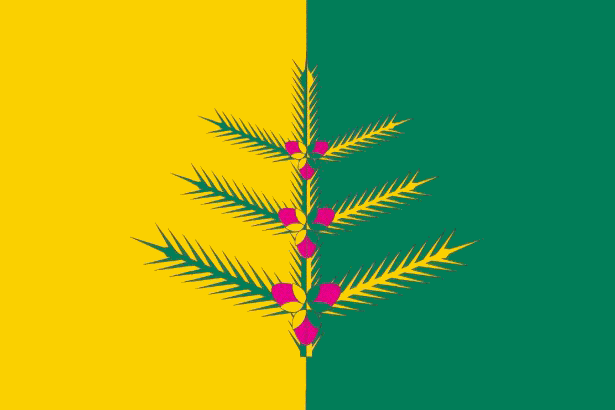
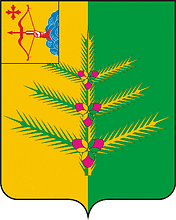
- Flag Coat of arms
- Location of Nemsky District in Kirov Oblast
- Coordinates: 57°31′N 50°29′E
- Country: Russia
- Federal subject: Kirov Oblast
- Established: June 10, 1929
- Administrative center: Nema

Area
  - Total: 2,158 km^{2} (833 sq mi)

Population (2010 Census)
  - Total: 7,983
  - Estimate (2015): 7,074
  - Density: 3.699/km^{2} (9.581/sq mi)
  - Urban: 45.7%
  - Rural: 54.3%

Administrative structure
  - Administrative divisions: 1 Urban-type settlements, 3 Rural okrugs
  - Inhabited localities: 1 urban-type settlements, 47 rural localities

Municipal structure
  - Municipally incorporated as: Nemsky Municipal District
  - Municipal divisions: 1 urban settlements, 3 rural settlements
- Time zone: UTC+3 (MSK)
- OKTMO ID: 33626000
- Website: http://adm-nems.ru

Population of Nemsky District
- 2010 Census: 7,983
- 2002 Census: 9,937
- 1989 Census: 11,410
- 1979 Census: 12,187

Nemsky District (Russian: Не́мский райо́н) is an administrative and municipal district (raion), one of the thirty-nine in Kirov Oblast, Russia. It is located in the southeast of the oblast. The area of the district is 2,158 square kilometers (833 sq mi). Its administrative center is the urban locality (an urban-type settlement) of Nema. As of the 2010 Census, the total population of the district was 7,983, with the population of Nema accounting for 45.7% of that number.

== History ==
The district was established on June 10, 1929.
