= Berezovka, Vladimir Oblast =

Berezovka Берёзовка
- Village
- Location within Vladimir Oblast Location within Russia
- Coordinates: 55°39′N 41°57′E
- Country: Russia
- Region: Vladimir Oblast
- District: Muromsky District
- Time zone: UTC+3:00

Berezovka (Russian: Берёзовка) is a rural locality (a village) in Kovarditskoye Rural Settlement, Muromsky District, Vladimir Oblast, Russia. The population was 32 as of 2010.

== Geography ==
Berezovka is located 15 km northwest of Murom (the district's administrative centre) by road. Saksino is the nearest rural locality.
