= Berezovka, Bizhbulyaksky District, Republic of Bashkortostan =

Berezovka Берёзовка
- Village
- Location within Bashkortostan Location within Russia
- Coordinates: 53°30′N 54°04′E
- Country: Russia
- Region: Bashkortostan
- District: Bizhbulyaksky District
- Time zone: UTC+5:00

Berezovka (Russian: Берёзовка) is a rural locality (a village) in Aitovsky Selsoviet, Bizhbulyaksky District, Bashkortostan, Russia. The population was 7 as of 2010. There are 2 streets.

== Geography ==
Berezovka is located 36 km southwest of Bizhbulyak (the district's administrative centre) by road. Alexeyevka is the nearest rural locality.
