= Berezovka, Zeysky District, Amur Oblast =

Berezovka Берёзовка
- Selo
- Location within Amur Oblast Location within Russia
- Coordinates: 53°27′N 126°57′E
- Country: Russia
- Region: Amur Oblast
- District: Zeysky District
- Time zone: UTC+9:00

Berezovka (Russian: Берёзовка) is a rural locality (a selo) in Nikolayevsky Selsoviet of Zeysky District, Amur Oblast, Russia. The population was 79 as of 2018. There are 4 streets.

== Geography ==
Berezovka is located on the left bank of the Zeya River, 49 km southwest of Zeya (the district's administrative centre) by road. Algach is the nearest rural locality.
