= Berezovka, Klintsovsky District, Bryansk Oblast =

Shamovka Берёзовка
- Village
- Location within Bryansk Oblast Location within Russia
- Coordinates: 52°52′N 32°09′E
- Country: Russia
- Region: Bryansk Oblast
- District: Klintsovsky District
- Time zone: UTC+3:00

Berezovka (Russian: Берёзовка) is a rural locality (a village) in Klintsovsky District, Bryansk Oblast, Russia. The population was 54 as of 2010. There are 3 streets.

== Geography ==
Berezovka is located 19 km north of Klintsy (the district's administrative centre) by road. Peschanka is the nearest rural locality.
