= Berezovka, Zilairsky District, Republic of Bashkortostan =

Berezovka Березовка
- Village
- Location within Bashkortostan Location within Russia
- Coordinates: 52°45′N 57°15′E
- Country: Russia
- Region: Bashkortostan
- District: Zilairsky District
- Time zone: UTC+5:00

Berezovka (Russian: Березовка) is a rural locality (a village) in Kananikolsky Selsoviet, Zilairsky District, Bashkortostan, Russia. The population was 77 as of 2010. There are 3 streets.

== Geography ==
Berezovka is located 90 km north of Zilair (the district's administrative centre) by road. Poboishche is the nearest rural locality.
