= Berezovka, Barnaul, Altai Krai =

Berezovka Берёзовка
- Settlement
- Location within Altai Krai Location within Russia
- Coordinates: 53°22′N 83°24′E
- Country: Russia
- Region: Altai Krai
- District: Barnaul
- Time zone: UTC+7:00

Berezovka (Russian: Берёзовка) is a rural locality (a settlement) in Barnaul, Altai Krai, Russia. The population was 537 as of 2013. There are 12 streets.

== Geography ==
Berezovka is located 33 km west of Barnaul by road. Novomikhaylovka is the nearest rural locality.
