= Berezovka, Vologodsky District, Vologda Oblast =

Berezovka Березовка
- Village
- Location within Vologda Oblast Location within Russia
- Coordinates: 59°19′N 39°21′E
- Country: Russia
- Region: Vologda Oblast
- District: Vologodsky District
- Time zone: UTC+3:00

Berezovka (Russian: Березовка) is a rural locality (a village) in Kubenskoye Rural Settlement, Vologodsky District, Vologda Oblast, Russia. The population was 10 as of 2002.

== Geography ==
Berezovka is located 57 km northwest of Vologda (the district's administrative centre) by road. Petrushino is the nearest rural locality.
