= Berezovka, Rubtsovsky District, Altai Krai =

Berezovka Берёзовка
- Settlement
- Location within Altai Krai Location within Russia
- Coordinates: 51°33′N 81°17′E
- Country: Russia
- Region: Altai Krai
- District: Rubtsovsky District
- Time zone: UTC+7:00

Berezovka (Russian: Берёзовка) is a rural locality (a settlement) in Bezrukavsky Selsoviet, Rubtsovsky District, Altai Krai, Russia. The population was 452 as of 2013. There are 3 streets.

== Geography ==
Berezovka is located 17 km northeast of Rubtsovsk (the district's administrative centre) by road. Bezrukavka is the nearest rural locality.
