= Berezovka, Karachevsky District, Bryansk Oblast =

Berezovka Берёзовка
- Settlement
- Location within Bryansk Oblast Location within Russia
- Coordinates: 53°09′N 34°49′E
- Country: Russia
- Region: Bryansk Oblast
- District: Karachevsky District
- Time zone: UTC+3:00

Berezovka (Russian: Берёзовка) is a rural locality (a settlement) and the administrative center of Mylinskoye Rural Settlement, Karachevsky District, Bryansk Oblast, Russia. The population was 815 as of 2010. There are 10 streets.

== Geography ==
Berezovka is located 11 km northwest of Karachev (the district's administrative centre) by road. Khokhlovka is the nearest rural locality.
