= Berezovka, Shipunovsky District, Altai Krai =

Berezovka Берёзовка
- Settlement
- Location within Altai Krai Location within Russia
- Coordinates: 52°26′N 82°14′E
- Country: Russia
- Region: Altai Krai
- District: Shipunovsky District
- Time zone: UTC+7:00

Berezovka (Russian: Берёзовка) is a rural locality (a settlement) in Bobrovsky Selsoviet, Shipunovsky District, Altai Krai, Russia. The population was 73 as of 2013. There are 3 streets.

== Geography ==
Berezovka is located 35 km north of Shipunovo (the district's administrative centre) by road. Bobrovka is the nearest rural locality.
