= Berezovka, Kudymkarsky District, Perm Krai =

Berezovka Берёзовка
- Settlement
- Location within Perm Krai Location within Russia
- Coordinates: 58°56′N 54°06′E
- Country: Russia
- Region: Perm Krai
- District: Kudymkarsky District
- Time zone: UTC+5:00

Berezovka (Russian: Берёзовка) is a rural locality (a settlement) in Verkh-Invenskoye Rural Settlement, Kudymkarsky District, Perm Krai, Russia. The population was 523 as of 2010. There are 14 streets.

== Geography ==
Berezovka is located 40 km southwest of Kudymkar (the district's administrative centre) by road. Samkovo is the nearest rural locality.
