= Shigony (selo) =

Rural locality in Samara Oblast, Russia

Coordinates: 53°23′17″N 48°40′21″E

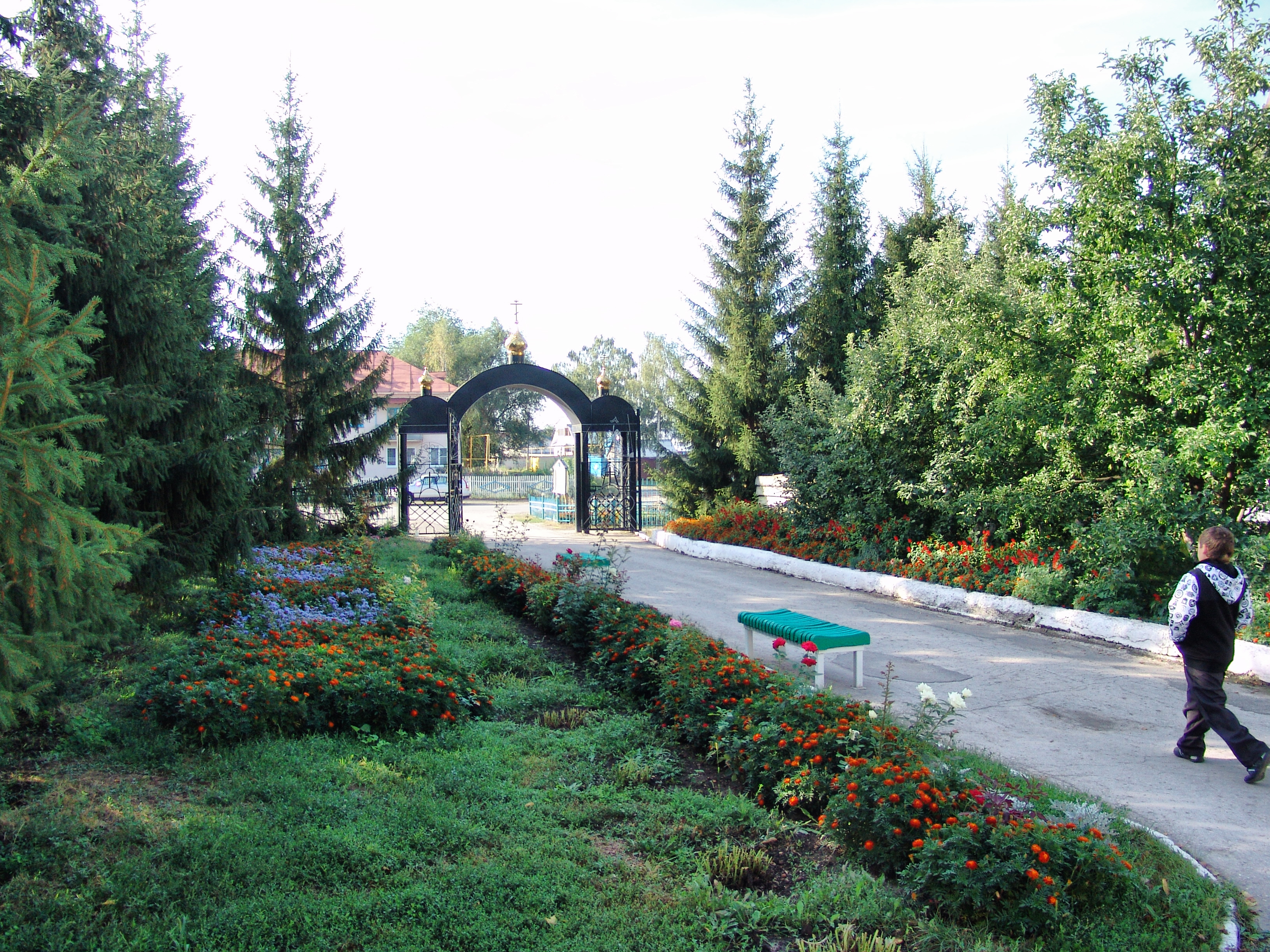
Church of St. Michael the Archangel in Shigony

Shigony (Russian: Шигóны) is a rural locality (a selo) and the administrative center of Shigonsky District, Samara Oblast, Russia. Population: 4,966 (2010 census); 5,309 (2002 census); 5,418 (1989 Soviet census).
