= Berezovka, Tyumentsevsky District, Altai Krai =

Berezovka Берёзовка
- Selo
- Location within Altai Krai Location within Russia
- Coordinates: 53°14′N 81°48′E
- Country: Russia
- Region: Altai Krai
- District: Tyumentsevsky District
- Time zone: UTC+7:00

Berezovka (Russian: Берёзовка) is a rural locality (a selo) and the administrative center of Beryozovsky Selsoviet, Tyumentsevsky District, Altai Krai, Russia. The population was 677 as of 2013. It was founded in 1907. There are 7 streets.

== Geography ==
Berezovka is located 29 km southeast of Tyumentsevo (the district's administrative centre) by road. Sosnovka is the nearest rural locality.
