= Berezovka, Zhukovsky District, Bryansk Oblast =

Berezovka Берёзовка
- Village
- Location within Bryansk Oblast Location within Russia
- Coordinates: 53°35′N 33°43′E
- Country: Russia
- Region: Bryansk Oblast
- District: Zhukovsky District
- Time zone: UTC+3:00

Berezovka (Russian: Берёзовка) is a rural locality (a village) in Zhukovsky District, Bryansk Oblast, Russia. The population was 3 as of 2010. There is 1 street.

== Geography ==
Berezovka is located 18 km north of Zhukovka (the district's administrative centre) by road. Logvani and Olsufyevo are the nearest rural localities.
