= Berezovka, Altai Republic =

Berezovka Берёзовка
- Settlement
- Location within Altai Republic Location within Russia
- Coordinates: 50°14′N 85°32′E
- Country: Russia
- Region: Altai Republic
- District: Ust-Koksinsky District
- Time zone: UTC+7:00

Berezovka (Russian: Берёзовка; Altay: Кайыҥду-Бел, Kayıñdu-Bel) is a rural locality (a settlement) in Ognyovskoye Rural Settlement of Ust-Koksinsky District, the Altai Republic, Russia. The population was 246 as of 2016. There are 6 streets.

== Geography ==
Berezovka is located on the left bank of the Katun River, 9 km southwest of Ust-Koksa (the district's administrative centre) by road. Ognyovka is the nearest rural locality.
