= Berezovka, Gafuriysky District, Republic of Bashkortostan =

Berezovka Берёзовка
- Village
- Location within Bashkortostan Location within Russia
- Coordinates: 54°04′N 56°28′E
- Country: Russia
- Region: Bashkortostan
- District: Gafuriysky District
- Time zone: UTC+5:00

Berezovka (Russian: Берёзовка) is a rural locality (a village) in Tabynsky Selsoviet, Gafuriysky District, Bashkortostan, Russia. The population was 154 as of 2010. There are 3 streets.

== Geography ==
Berezovka is located 26 km north of Krasnousolsky (the district's administrative centre) by road. Novye Burly is the nearest rural locality.
