= Berezovka, Chernushinsky District, Perm Krai =

Berezovka Березовка
- Village
- Location within Perm Krai Location within Russia
- Coordinates: 56°38′N 56°16′E
- Country: Russia
- Region: Perm Krai
- District: Chernushinsky District
- Time zone: UTC+5:00

Berezovka (Russian: Березовка) is a rural locality (a village) in Chernushinsky District, Perm Krai, Russia. The population was 26 as of 2010. There are 2 streets.

== Geography ==
Berezovka is located 22 km northeast of Chernushka (the district's administrative centre) by road. Bogatovka is the nearest rural locality.
