= Oktyabrsky, Murmansk Oblast =

Abolished inhabited locality in Murmansk Oblast, Russia

Oktyabrsky Октябрьский
- Inhabited locality (abolished)
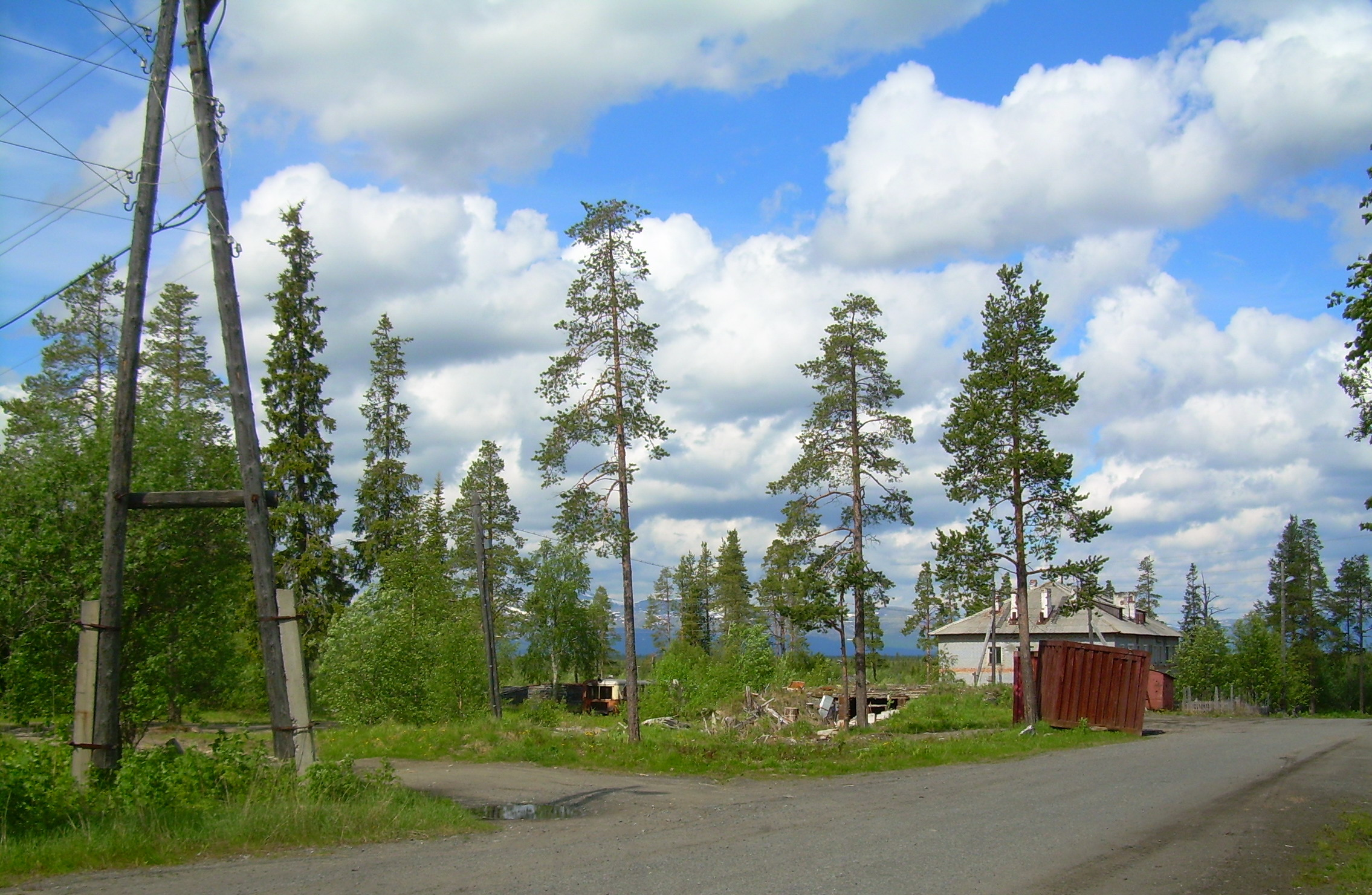
- View of Oktyabrsky in 2007
- Interactive map of Oktyabrsky
- Location of Oktyabrsky Oktyabrsky (Murmansk Oblast)
- Coordinates: 67°30′N 34°19′E
- Country: Russia
- Federal subject: Murmansk Oblast
- Abolished: April 26, 2013
- Elevation: 147 m (482 ft)

Population (2010 Census)
  - Total: 41
  - Estimate (2010): 41 (0%)

Administrative status
  - Subordinated to: Kirovsk Town with Jurisdictional Territory

Municipal status
  - Urban okrug: Kirovsk Urban Okrug
- Time zone: UTC+3 (MSK)
- Postal code: 184250
- OKTMO ID: 47712000116

Oktyabrsky (Russian: Октя́брьский) was a rural locality (an inhabited locality) in the administrative jurisdiction of Kirovsk Town with Jurisdictional Territory in Murmansk Oblast, Russia, located on the Kola Peninsula beyond the Arctic Circle at a height of 147 meters (482 ft) above sea level. Its population was 41, as per the 2010 Census. Due to depopulation, the settlement was abolished as an inhabited locality effective April 26, 2013.
