= Berezovka, Rudnyansky District, Volgograd Oblast =

Berezovka Берёзовка
- Selo
- Location within Volgograd Oblast Location within Russia
- Coordinates: 50°39′N 44°30′E
- Country: Russia
- Region: Volgograd Oblast
- District: Rudnyansky District
- Time zone: UTC+4:00

Berezovka (Russian: Берёзовка) is a rural locality (a selo) in Lopukhovskoye Rural Settlement, Rudnyansky District, Volgograd Oblast, Russia. The population was 45 as of 2010.

== Geography ==
Berezovka is located in steppe, on the right bank of the Medveditsa River, 26 km southwest of Rudnya (the district's administrative centre) by road. Ushinka is the nearest rural locality.
