= Berezovka, Rassvetovsky Selsoviet, Yelansky District, Volgograd Oblast =

Berezovka Берёзовка
- Selo
- Location within Volgograd Oblast Location within Russia
- Coordinates: 50°52′N 43°59′E
- Country: Russia
- Region: Volgograd Oblast
- District: Yelansky District
- Time zone: UTC+4:00

Berezovka (Russian: Берёзовка) is a rural locality (a selo) and the administrative center of Rassvetovskoye Rural Settlement, Yelansky District, Volgograd Oblast, Russia. The population was 1,003 as of 2010. There are 8 streets.

== Geography ==
The village is located on the bank of the Tersa River.
