= Berezovka, Arkhangelsky District, Republic of Bashkortostan =

Berezovka Берёзовка
- Village
- Location within Bashkortostan Location within Russia
- Coordinates: 54°26′N 56°31′E
- Country: Russia
- Region: Bashkortostan
- District: Arkhangelsky District
- Time zone: UTC+5:00

Berezovka (Russian: Берёзовка) is a rural locality (a village) in Irnykshinsky Selsoviet, Arkhangelsky District, Bashkortostan, Russia. The population was 44 as of 2010. There is 1 street.

== Geography ==
Berezovka is located 19 km northwest of Arkhangelskoye (the district's administrative centre) by road. Karakul is the nearest rural locality.
