= Berezovka, Belebeyevsky District, Republic of Bashkortostan =

Berezovka Берёзовка
- Village
- Location within Bashkortostan Location within Russia
- Coordinates: 54°03′N 54°26′E
- Country: Russia
- Region: Bashkortostan
- District: Belebeyevsky District
- Time zone: UTC+5:00

Berezovka (Russian: Берёзовка) is a rural locality (a village) in Znamensky Selsoviet, Belebeyevsky District, Bashkortostan, Russia. The population was 4 as of 2010. There is 1 street.

== Geography ==
Berezovka is located 44 km east of Belebey (the district's administrative centre) by road. Novosarayevo is the nearest rural locality.
