= Berezovka, Davlekanovsky District, Republic of Bashkortostan =

Berezovka Берёзовка
- Selo
- Location within Bashkortostan Location within Russia
- Coordinates: 54°19′N 54°51′E
- Country: Russia
- Region: Bashkortostan
- District: Davlekanovsky District
- Time zone: UTC+5:00

Berezovka (Russian: Берёзовка) is a rural locality (a selo) in Alginsky Selsoviet, Davlekanovsky District, Bashkortostan, Russia. The population was 145 as of 2010. There are 3 streets.

== Geography ==
Berezovka is located 24 km northwest of Davlekanovo (the district's administrative centre) by road. Voroshilovo is the nearest rural locality.
