= Berezovka, Berezovsky Selsoviet, Yelansky District, Volgograd Oblast =

Berezovka Берёзовка
- Selo
- Location within Volgograd Oblast Location within Russia
- Coordinates: 51°05′N 43°56′E
- Country: Russia
- Region: Volgograd Oblast
- District: Yelansky District
- Time zone: UTC+4:00

Berezovka (Russian: Берёзовка) is a rural locality (a selo) and the administrative center of Beryozovskoye Rural Settlement, Yelansky District, Volgograd Oblast, Russia. The population was 406 as of 2010. There are 8 streets.

== Geography ==
The village is located on Khopyorsko-Buzulukskaya Plain, on the Beryozovaya River, 340 km from Volgograd and 23 km from Yelan.
