= Berezovka, Ivanovsky District, Amur Oblast =

Berezovka Берёзовка
- Selo
- Location within Amur Oblast Location within Russia
- Coordinates: 50°34′N 127°51′E
- Country: Russia
- Region: Amur Oblast
- District: Ivanovsky District
- Time zone: UTC+9:00

Berezovka (Russian: Берёзовка) is a rural locality (a selo) and the administrative center of Berezovsky Selsoviet of Ivanovsky District, Amur Oblast, Russia. The population was 3,139 as of 2018. There are 32 streets.

== Geography ==
Berezovka is located 30 km north of Ivanovka (the district's administrative centre) by road. Solnechnoye is the nearest rural locality.
