= Berezovka, Birsky District, Republic of Bashkortostan =

Berezovka Берёзовка
- Selo
- Location within Bashkortostan Location within Russia
- Coordinates: 55°15′N 55°23′E
- Country: Russia
- Region: Bashkortostan
- District: Birsky District
- Time zone: UTC+5:00

Berezovka (Russian: Берёзовка) is a rural locality (a selo) in Berezovsky Selsoviet, Birsky District, Bashkortostan, Russia. The population was 534 as of 2010. There are 13 streets.

== Geography ==
Berezovka is located 39 km (24 mi) southwest of Birsk (the district's administrative centre) by road. Aybashevo is the nearest rural locality.
