= Berezovka, Pospelikhinsky District, Altai Krai =

Berezovka Берёзовка
- Settlement
- Location within Altai Krai Location within Russia
- Coordinates: 52°11′N 81°46′E
- Country: Russia
- Region: Altai Krai
- District: Pospelikhinsky District
- Time zone: UTC+7:00

Berezovka (Russian: Берёзовка) is a rural locality (a settlement) in Pospelikhinsky District, Altai Krai, Russia. The population was 76 in 2014.

== Geography ==
Berezovka is located 31 km north of Pospelikha (the district's administrative centre) by road. Klepechikha is the nearest rural locality.

== Ethnicity ==
The settlement is inhabited by Russians.
