= Berezovka, Blagoveshchensky District, Republic of Bashkortostan =

Berezovka Берёзовка
- Village
- Location within Bashkortostan Location within Russia
- Coordinates: 55°23′N 56°33′E
- Country: Russia
- Region: Bashkortostan
- District: Blagoveshchensky District
- Time zone: UTC+5:00

Berezovka (Russian: Берёзовка) is a rural locality (a village) in Tugaysky Selsoviet, Blagoveshchensky District, Bashkortostan, Russia. The population was 12 as of 2010. There are 2 streets.

== Geography ==
Berezovka is located 65 km northeast of Blagoveshchensk (the district's administrative centre) by road.
