= Berezovka, Aurgazinsky District, Republic of Bashkortostan =

Berezovka Берёзовка
- Village
- Location within Bashkortostan Location within Russia
- Coordinates: 53°52′N 55°38′E
- Country: Russia
- Region: Bashkortostan
- District: Aurgazinsky District
- Time zone: UTC+5:00

Berezovka (Russian: Берёзовка) is a rural locality (a village) in Semyonkinsky Selsoviet, Aurgazinsky District, Bashkortostan, Russia. The population was 7 as of 2010. There is 1 street.

== Geography ==
Berezovka is located 33 km southwest of Tolbazy (the district's administrative centre) by road. Shlanly is the nearest rural locality.
