= Berezovka, Pervomaysky District, Altai Krai =

Berezovka Берёзовка
- Selo
- Location within Altai Krai Location within Russia
- Coordinates: 53°24′N 84°00′E
- Country: Russia
- Region: Altai Krai
- District: Pervomaysky District
- Time zone: UTC+7:00

Berezovka (Russian: Берёзовка) is a rural locality (a selo) and the administrative center of Beryozovsky Selsoviet, Pervomaysky District, Altai Krai, Russia. The population was 57 as of 2013. There are 6 streets.

== Geography ==
Berezovka is located 6 km east of Novoaltaysk (the district's administrative centre) by road. Bazhevo and Solnechnoye are the nearest rural localities.
