= Nema (urban-type settlement) =

Nema Нема
- Urban-type settlement
- Interactive map of Nema
- Location of Nema Nema (Kirov Oblast)
- Coordinates: 57.5052°N 50.5037°E
- Country: Russia
- Federal subject: Kirov Oblast
- Administrative district: Nemsky District
- Founded: 1710

Population (2010 Census)
  - Total: 3,650
  - Estimate (2025): 2,913 (−20.2%)
- Time zone: UTC+3 (MSK)
- Postal code: 613470
- OKTMO ID: 33626151051

Nema (Russian: Нема) is an urban locality (an urban-type settlement) in Nemsky District of Kirov Oblast, Russia. Population: 3,650 (2010 census); 3,916 (2002 census); 4,141 (1989 Soviet census).
