= Berezovka, Soloneshensky District, Altai Krai =

Berezovka Берёзовка
- Selo
- Location within Altai Krai Location within Russia
- Coordinates: 51°50′N 84°02′E
- Country: Russia
- Region: Altai Krai
- District: Soloneshensky District
- Time zone: UTC+7:00

Berezovka (Russian: Берёзовка) is a rural locality (a selo) and the administrative center of Beryozovsky Selsoviet, Soloneshensky District, Altai Krai, Russia. The population was 683 as of 2013. There are 8 streets.

== Geography ==
Berezovka is located on the Beryozovka River, 36 km northwest of Soloneshnoye (the district's administrative centre) by road. Yurtnoye and Sibiryachikha are the nearest rural localities.
