= Suzemka =

Urban locality in Bryansk Oblast, Russia

Suzemka Суземка
- Urban-type settlement
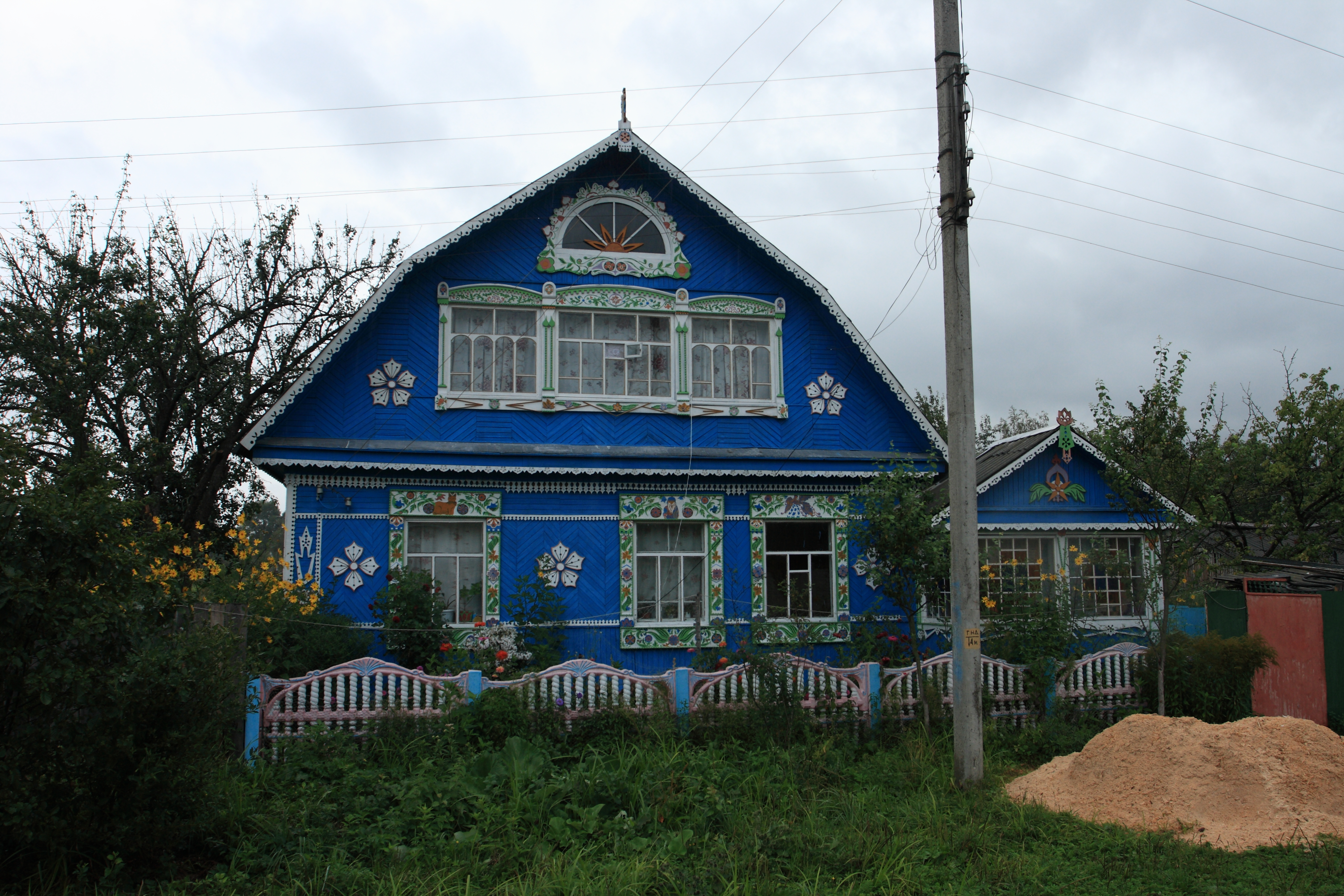

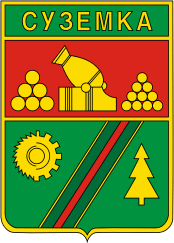
- Coat of arms
- Interactive map of Suzemka
- Location of Suzemka Suzemka (Bryansk Oblast)
- Coordinates: 52°19′00″N 34°04′47″E
- Country: Russia
- Federal subject: Bryansk Oblast
- Administrative district: Suzemsky District

Population (2010 Census)
  - Total: 9,125
  - Estimate (2025): 8,343 (−8.6%)
- Time zone: UTC+3 (MSK)
- Postal code: 242190
- OKTMO ID: 15652151051

Suzemka (Russian: Сузе́мка) is an urban-type settlement and the administrative center of Suzemsky District, Bryansk Oblast, Russia. Population: 8,672 (2021 census); 9,125 (2010 census); 9,712 (2002 census); 9,422 (1989 Soviet census).
