= Charyshsky District =

Charyshsky District Чарышский район (Russian)
- District
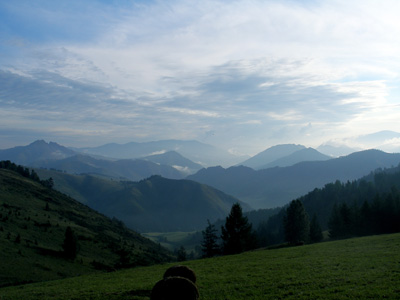
- Bashchelaksky Ridge on the territory of Charyshsky District
- Location of Charyshsky District in Altai Krai
- Coordinates: 51°24′N 83°34′E
- Country: Russia
- Federal subject: Altai Krai
- Established: 27 May 1924
- Administrative center: Charyshskoye

Area
  - Total: 6,881 km^{2} (2,657 sq mi)

Population (2010 Census)
  - Total: 12,337
  - Density: 1.793/km^{2} (4.644/sq mi)
  - Urban: 0%
  - Rural: 100%

Administrative structure
  - Administrative divisions: 9 selsoviet
  - Inhabited localities: 32 rural localities

Municipal structure
  - Municipally incorporated as: Charyshsky Municipal District
  - Municipal divisions: 0 urban settlements, 9 rural settlements
- Time zone: UTC+7 (MSK+4)
- OKTMO ID: 01658000
- Website: http://www.charysh.ru/

Charyshsky District (Russian: Чары́шский райо́н) is an administrative and municipal district (raion), one of the fifty-nine in Altai Krai, Russia. It is located in the south of the krai. The area of the district is 6,881 square kilometers (2,657 sq mi). Its administrative center is the rural locality (a selo) of Charyshskoye. Population: 12,337 (2010 census); 14,898 (2002 census); 15,774 (1989 Soviet census). The population of Charyshskoye accounts for 26.1% of the district's total population.

== Geography ==
Charyshsky District is located in the southeast of Altai Krai, on the western foothills and beginnings of the Altai Mountains to the east. The 2,490 metres (8,170 ft) high Mayak Shangina of the Korgon Range, located at the southern end of the district, is the highest point of the Krai. The Charysh River flows from east to west across the central part of the district. The area in the northwest of the district is low foothills, and the administrative center, the town of Charyshsky, is in the northwest on the Charysh River banks. Most of the southeast is forested and mountainous, on black (chernozem) southern mountain soils. Charyshsky District is 175 km west of the city of Barnaul, and 3,000 km east of Moscow. The area measures 130 km (north-south), and 80 km (west-east); total area is 6,910 km2 (about 7% of Altai Krai).

The district is bordered on the north by Ust-Kalmansky District, on the east by the Altai Republic, on the south by Kazakhstan, and on the west by Krasnoshchyokovsky District.

== History ==
Charyshsky District was formed as part of the Biysk Altai district on May 27, 1924. It was renamed Charyshsky District on January 1, 1932. In 1963 it was included into Ust-Kalmansky District, but restored as a separate district (renamed Charyshsky District) later in 1963.
