= Suzemsky District =

Suzemsky District Суземский район (Russian)
- District
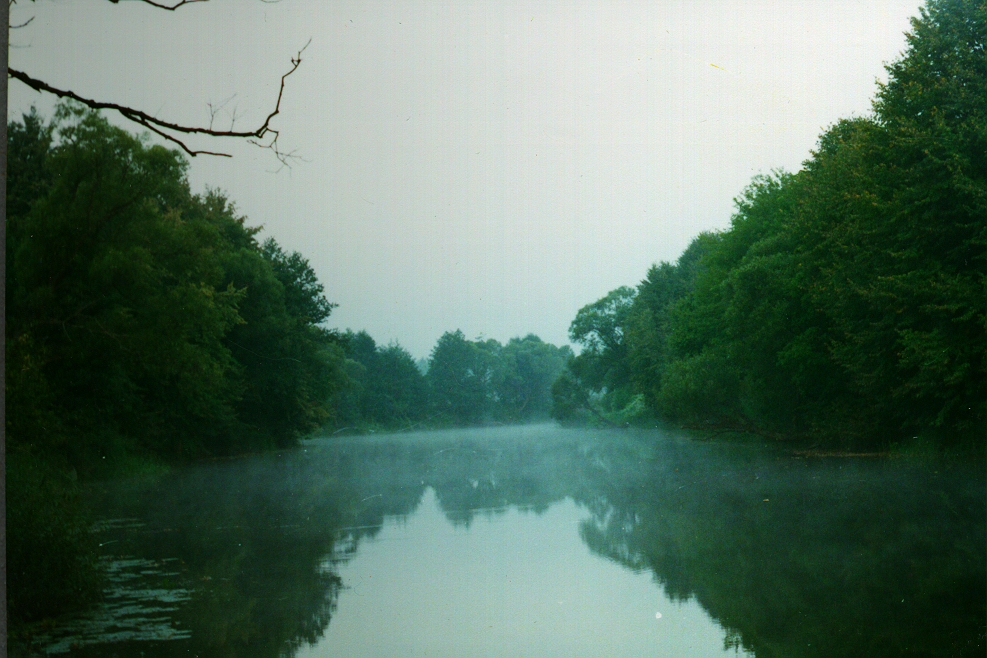
- Fog over the Sev River in Suzemsky District

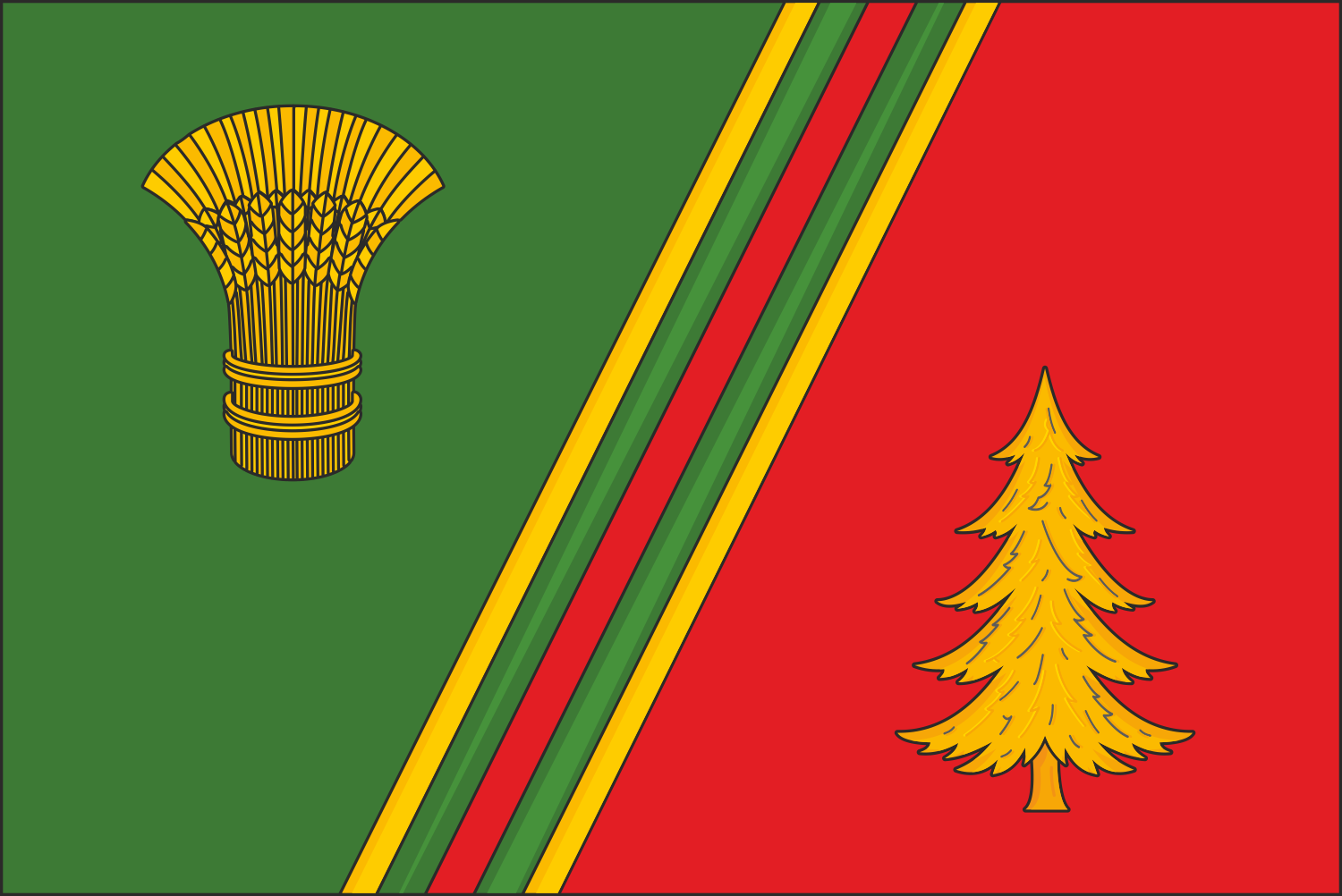
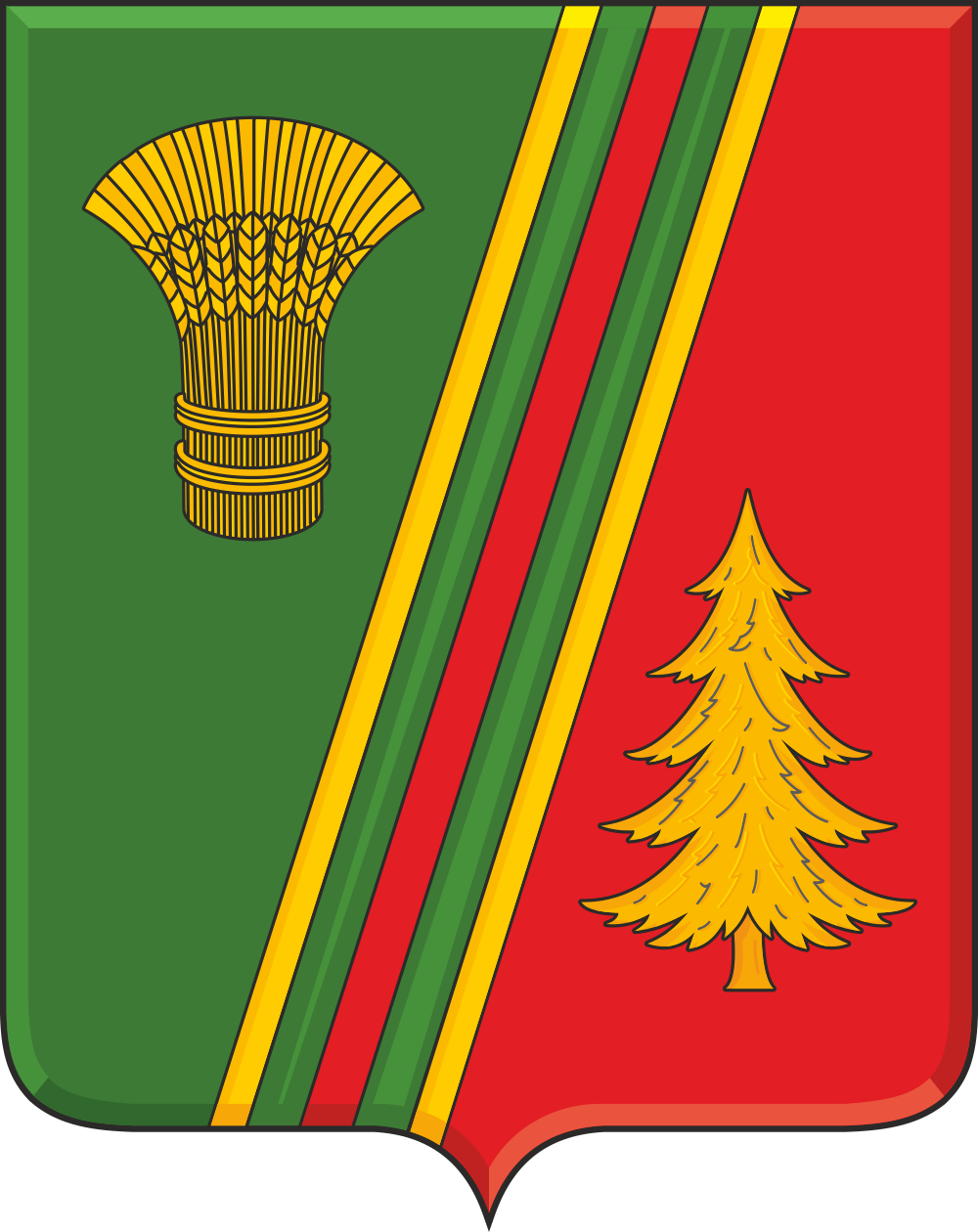
- Flag Coat of arms
- Location of Suzemsky District in Bryansk Oblast
- Coordinates: 52°19′11″N 34°04′44″E
- Country: Russia
- Federal subject: Bryansk Oblast
- Established: 1929
- Administrative center: Suzemka

Area
  - Total: 1,339.32 km^{2} (517.11 sq mi)

Population (2010 Census)
  - Total: 16,654
  - Density: 12.435/km^{2} (32.206/sq mi)
  - Urban: 66.6%
  - Rural: 33.4%

Administrative structure
  - Administrative divisions: 2 Settlement administrative okrugs, 5 Rural administrative okrugs
  - Inhabited localities: 2 urban-type settlements, 50 rural localities

Municipal structure
  - Municipally incorporated as: Suzemsky Municipal District
  - Municipal divisions: 2 urban settlements, 5 rural settlements
- Time zone: UTC+3 (MSK)
- OKTMO ID: 15652000
- Website: http://www.admsuzemka.ru/

Suzemsky District (Russian: Сузе́мский райо́н) is an administrative and municipal district (raion), one of the twenty-seven in Bryansk Oblast, Russia. It is located in the southeast of the oblast. The area of the district is 1,339.32 square kilometers (517.11 sq mi). Its administrative center is the urban locality (a work settlement) of Suzemka. Population: 15,254 (2021 census); 16,654 (2010 census); 19,513 (2002 Census); 20,786 (1989 Soviet census). The population of Suzemka accounts for 56.9% of the district's total population.
