= Charyshskoye, Charyshsky District, Altai Krai =

Rural locality in Altai Krai, Russia

Charyshskoye Чарышское
- Selo
- Interactive map of Charyshskoye
- Location of Charyshskoye Charyshskoye (Altai Krai)
- Coordinates: 51°23′55″N 83°33′48″E
- Country: Russia
- Federal subject: Altai Krai
- Administrative district: Charyshsky District
- SelsovietSelsoviet: Charyshsky Selsoviet
- Founded: 1765

Population (2010 Census)
  - Total: 3,217
  - Estimate (2021): 3,089 (−4%)

Administrative status
  - Capital of: Charyshsky District, Charyshsky Selsoviet

Municipal status
  - Municipal district: Charyshsky Municipal District
  - Rural settlement: Charyshsky Selsoviet Rural Settlement
  - Capital of: Charyshsky Municipal District, Charyshsky Selsoviet Rural Settlement
- Time zone: UTC+7 (MSK+4)
- Postal code: 658170
- OKTMO ID: 01658488101

Charyshskoye (Russian: Чарышское) is a rural locality (a selo) and the administrative center of Charyshsky District of Altai Krai, Russia. Population: 3,217 (2010 census); 3,444 (2002 census); 3,700 (1989 Soviet census).
