= Shigonsky District =

Shigonsky District Шигонский район (Russian)
- District
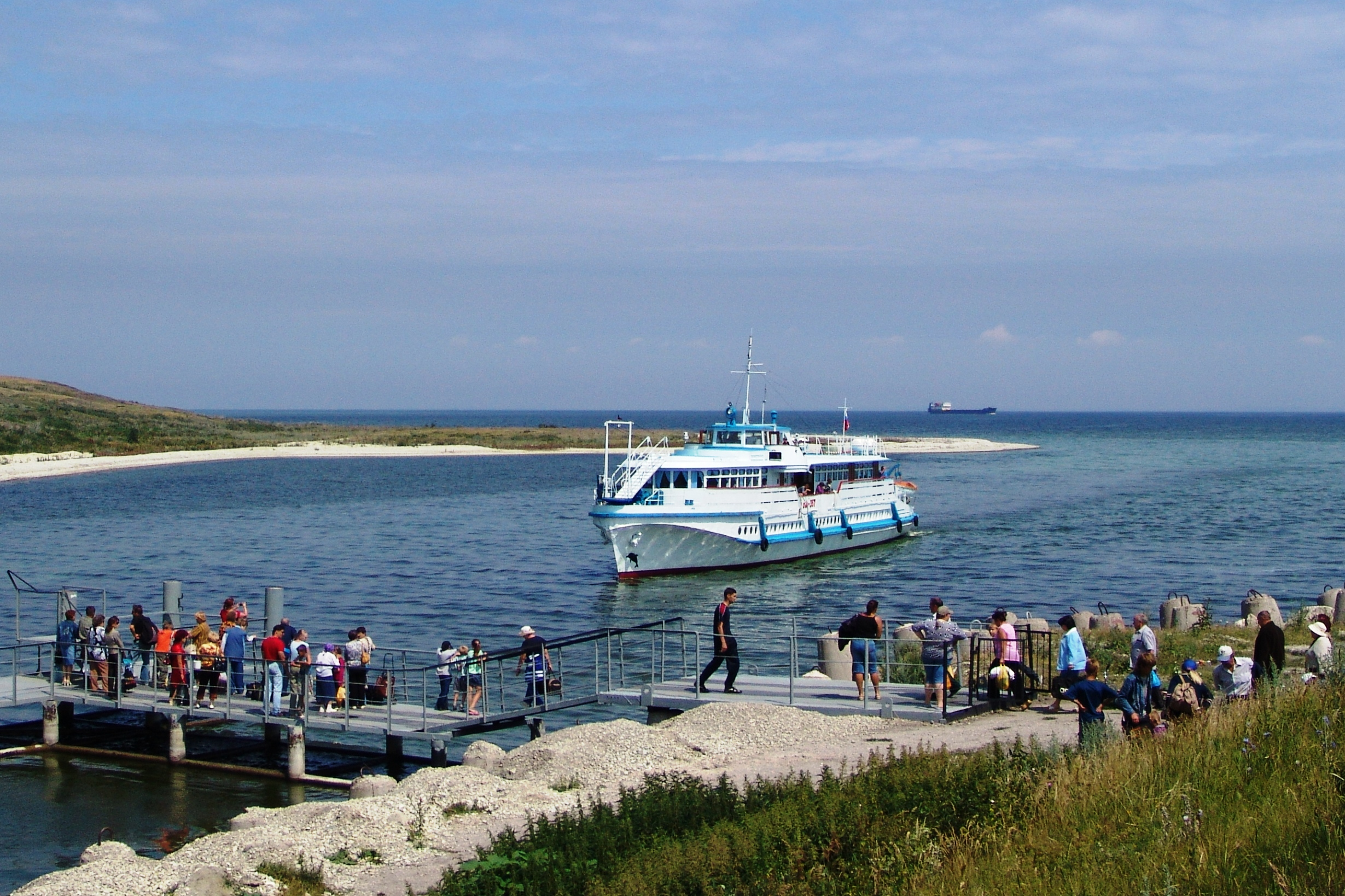
- River transport, Shigonsky District

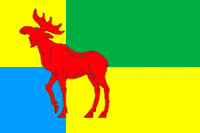
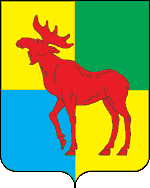
- Flag Coat of arms
- Location of Shigonsky District in Samara Oblast
- Coordinates: 53°23′11″N 48°40′42″E
- Country: Russia
- Federal subject: Samara Oblast
- Established: 12 January 1965
- Administrative center: Shigony

Area
  - Total: 2,134.4 km^{2} (824.1 sq mi)

Population (2010 Census)
  - Total: 21,002
  - Density: 9.8398/km^{2} (25.485/sq mi)
  - Urban: 0%
  - Rural: 100%

Administrative structure
  - Inhabited localities: 46 rural localities

Municipal structure
  - Municipally incorporated as: Shigonsky Municipal District
  - Municipal divisions: 0 urban settlements, 12 rural settlements
- Time zone: UTC+4 (MSK+1)
- OKTMO ID: 36650000
- Website: http://www.shigony.samregion.ru/

Shigonsky District (Russian: Шиго́нский райо́н) is an administrative and municipal district (raion), one of the twenty-seven in Samara Oblast, Russia. It is located in the west of the oblast. The area of the district is 2,134.4 square kilometers (824.1 sq mi). Its administrative center is the rural locality (a selo) of Shigony. Population: 21,002 (2010 Census); 23,596 (2002 census); 26,001 (1989 Soviet census). The population of the administrative center accounts for 23.7% of the district's total population.
