= Krasnoshchyokovo, Altai Krai =

Rural locality in Russia

Krasnoshchyokovo Краснощёково
- Selo
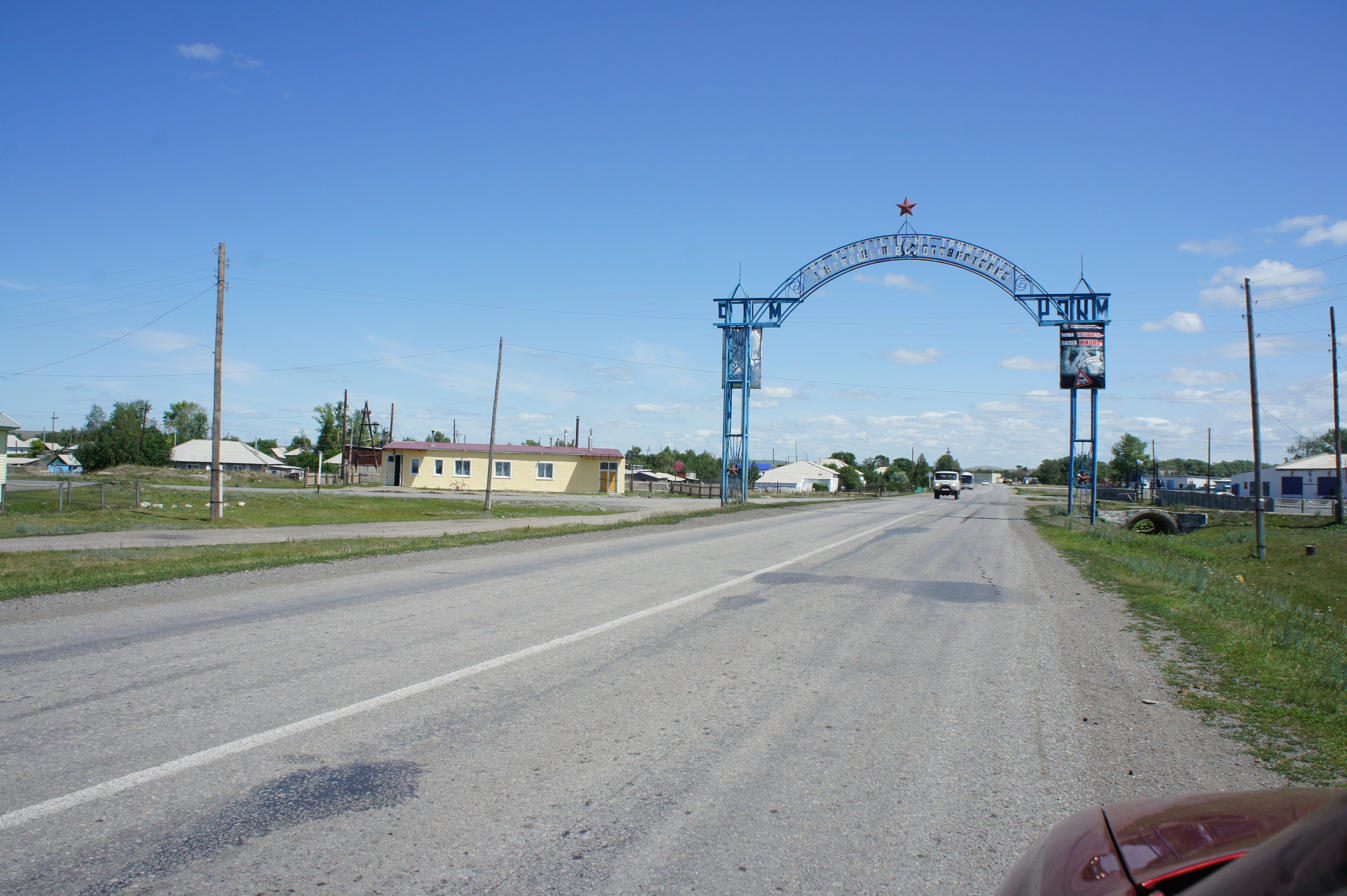
- Interactive map of Krasnoshchyokovo
- Location of Krasnoshchyokovo Krasnoshchyokovo (Altai Krai)
- Coordinates: 51°40′0″N 82°44′15″E
- Country: Russia
- Federal subject: Altai Krai
- Administrative district: Krasnoshchyokovsky District
- SelsovietSelsoviet: Krasnoshchyokovsky Selsoviet
- Founded: 1748

Population (2010 Census)
  - Total: 5,078
  - Estimate (2021): 4,492 (−11.5%)

Administrative status
  - Capital of: Krasnoshchyokovsky District, Krasnoshchyokovsky Selsoviet

Municipal status
  - Municipal district: Krasnoshchyokovsky Municipal District
  - Rural settlement: Krasnoshchyokovsky Selsoviet Rural Settlement
  - Capital of: Krasnoshchyokovsky Municipal District, Krasnoshchyokovsky Selsoviet Rural Settlement
- Time zone: UTC+7 (MSK+4)
- Postal code: 658340
- OKTMO ID: 01620430101

Krasnoshchyokovo (Russian: Краснощёково) is a rural locality (a selo) and the administrative center of Krasnoshchyokovsky District of Altai Krai, Russia. Population: 5,078 (2010 census); 5,506 (2002 census); 5,501 (1989 Soviet census).
