= Krasnoshchyokovsky District =

Krasnoshchyokovsky District Краснощёковский район (Russian)
- District
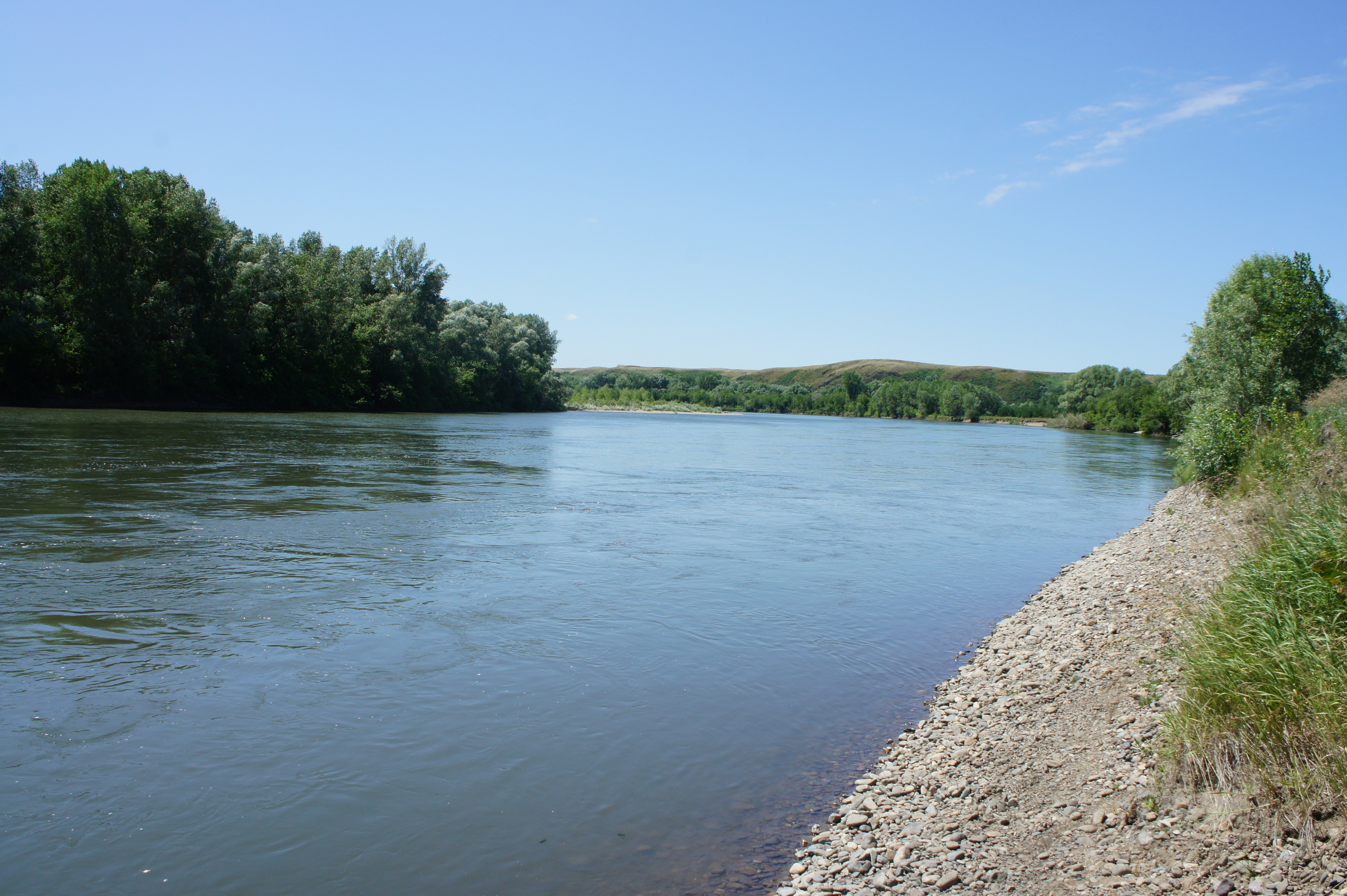
- The Charysh River near the selo of Krasnoshchyokovo in Krasnoshchyokovsky District
- Location of Krasnoshchyokovsky District in Altai Krai
- Coordinates: 51°40′N 82°44′E
- Country: Russia
- Federal subject: Altai Krai
- Established: 1934
- Administrative center: Krasnoshchyokovo

Area
  - Total: 3,543 km^{2} (1,368 sq mi)

Population (2010 Census)
  - Total: 19,251
  - Density: 5.434/km^{2} (14.07/sq mi)
  - Urban: 0%
  - Rural: 100%

Administrative structure
  - Administrative divisions: 13 Selsoviets
  - Inhabited localities: 28 rural localities

Municipal structure
  - Municipally incorporated as: Krasnoshchyokovsky Municipal District
  - Municipal divisions: 0 urban settlements, 13 rural settlements
- Time zone: UTC+7 (MSK+4)
- OKTMO ID: 01620000
- Website: http://krasadm.ru

Population of Krasnoshchyokovsky District
- 2010 Census: 19,251
- 2002 Census: 22,483
- 1989 Census: 23,975
- 1979 Census: 24,140

Krasnoshchyokovsky District (Russian: Краснощёковский райо́н) is an administrative and municipal district (raion), one of the fifty-nine in Altai Krai, Russia. It is located in the south of the krai. The area of the district is 3,543 square kilometers (1,368 sq mi). Its administrative center is the rural locality (a selo) of Krasnoshchyokovo. As of the 2010 Census, the total population of the district was 19,251, with the population of Krasnoshchyokovo accounting for 26.4% of that number.
