= 2026 Ulyanovsk Oblast gubernatorial election =

Regional legislative election in Russia

- 18–20 September 2026
- Turnout: 68.73% ▲23.23 pp
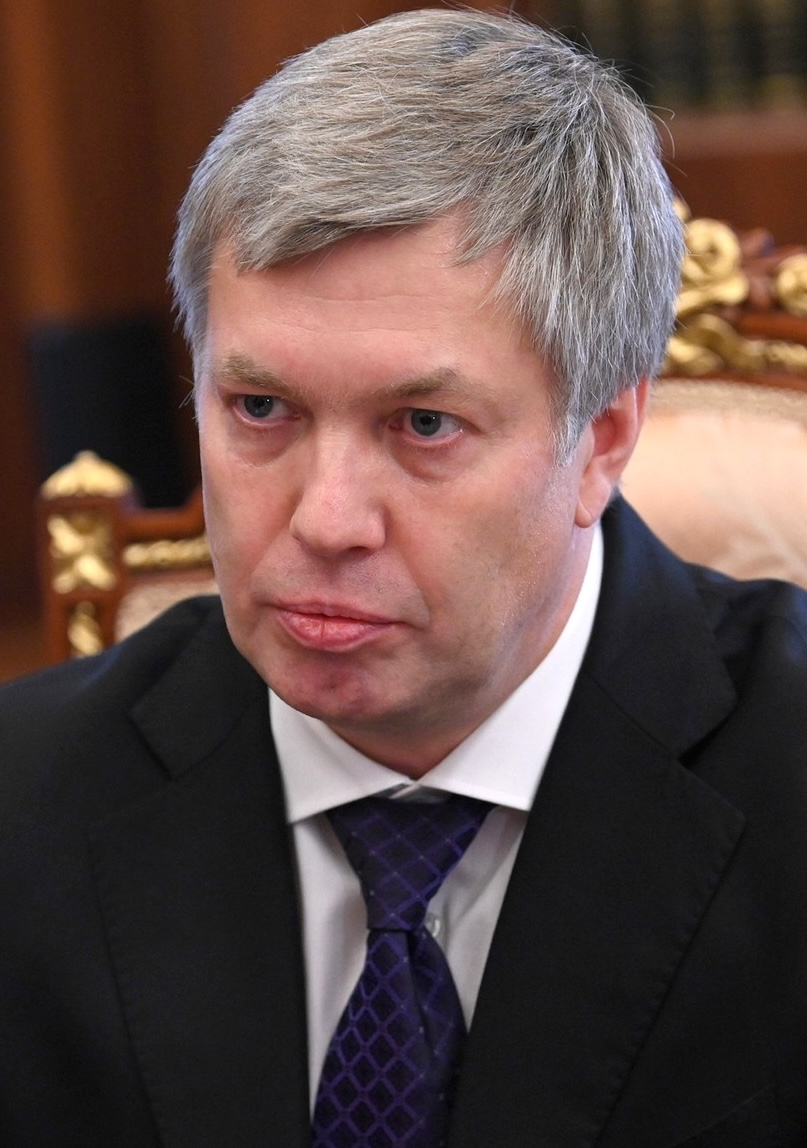

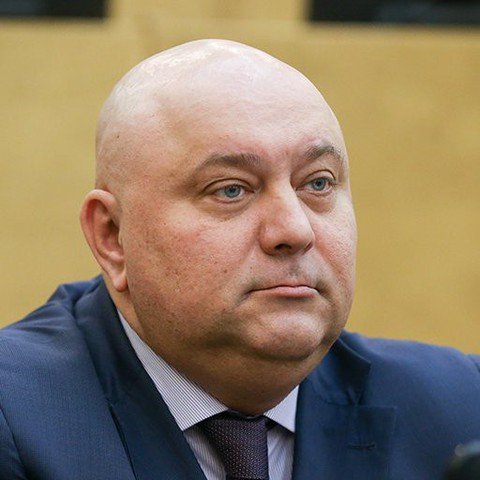

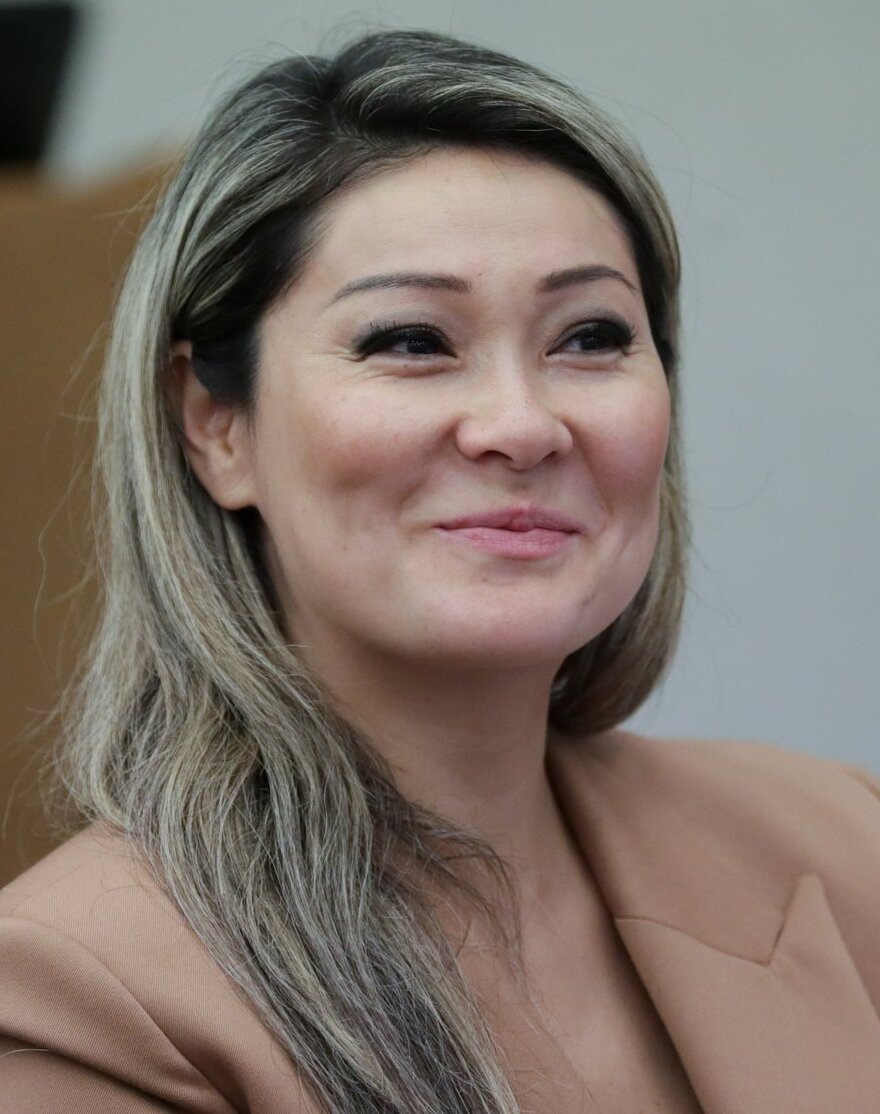
Candidate	Aleksey Russkikh	Sergey Marinin
Party	CPRF	LDPR
Popular vote	484,361	54,819
Percentage	77.05%	8.72%
		NL
Candidate	Marina Kim	Yulia Yasaitis
Party	A Just Russia	New People
Popular vote	46,001	32,895
Percentage	7.32%	5.23%
Governor before election
Aleksey Russkikh
CPRF
Governor-elect
Aleksey Russkikh
CPRF
Senator before election
Ayrat Gibatdinov
CPRF
Senator after election
Ayrat Gibatdinov
CPRF

The 2026 Ulyanovsk Oblast gubernatorial election took place on 18–20 September 2026, on common election day, to elect the Governor of Ulyanovsk Oblast, coinciding with the 2026 Russian legislative election. Incumbent Governor Aleksey Russkikh was re-elected for a second term in office.

== Background ==
Then-Governor of Ulyanovsk Oblast Sergey Morozov, who served in office since 2004, announced his resignation in April 2021 to run for State Duma. At the time of his resignation Morozov was the longest-serving incumbent Russian governor. President of Russia Vladimir Putin accepted Morozov's resignation and appointed Communist Aleksey Russkikh, Senator from Moscow Oblast, as acting Governor of Ulyanovsk Oblast. CPRF had strong positions in Ulyanovsk Oblast, as in 2016 Alexey Kurinny placed second in the gubernatorial election with 25% and simultaneously was elected to the State Duma from Ulyanovsk constituency, while in 2018 CPRF placed first in the Legislative Assembly of Ulyanovsk Oblast election. Acting Governor Russkikh ran for a full term as CPRF candidate with the support from United Russia and overwhelmingly won the election in September 2021 with 83.16% of the vote. Meanwhile, Morozov was elected to the State Duma on the United Russia party list and became party deputy faction leader.

Russkikh's gubernatorial term was marked with conflicts with both his predecessor Morozov, who retained significant influence in Ulyanovsk Oblast, and Kurinny, who controlled CPRF regional branch. Regional officials also faced anticorruption investigations with Dimitrovgrad mayor Andrey Bolshakov and former First Deputy Governor Igor Edel being arrested in August 2023, while former Deputy Chairman of the Government of Ulyanovsk Oblast Vladimir Pushkaryov was apprehended in October 2025. In September 2025 Russkikh was named among most vulnerable governors in Russia due to regional conflicts and party membership.

Despite friction in the regional elite, CPRF first deputy chairman Yury Afonin and political experts viewed Russkikh as likely to seek a second term in office.

== Candidates ==
In Ulyanovsk Oblast candidates for governor can be nominated only by registered political parties. A candidate for Governor of Ulyanovsk Oblast should be a Russian citizen and at least 30 years old. Candidates for Governor of Ulyanovsk Oblast should not have a foreign citizenship or residence permit. Each candidate in order to be registered is required to collect at least 9% of the signatures of municipal deputies and heads of municipalities. Also gubernatorial candidates present 3 candidacies to the Federation Council and election winner later appoints one of the presented candidates.

=== Declared candidates ===
Candidate name, political party	Occupation	Status	Ref.
Marina Kim; A Just Russia	Member of State Duma (2024–present); 2021 Khabarovsk Krai gubernatorial candidate	Registered	
Sergey Marinin; Liberal Democratic Party	Former Member of State Duma (2011–2021); 2016 and 2021 gubernatorial candidate	Registered	
Aleksey Russkikh; Communist Party	Incumbent Governor of Ulyanovsk Oblast (2021–present)	Registered	
Yulia Yasaitis; New People	Auto repair shop owner	Registered	

=== Candidates for Federation Council ===
Gubernatorial candidate, political party	Candidates for Federation Council	Status
Marina Kim; A Just Russia	* Grigory Matveyev, farmers store owner * Andrey Sedov, Member of Legislative Assembly of Ulyanovsk Oblast (2018–present) * Marina Tsvetkova, lawyer	Registered
Sergey Marinin; Liberal Democratic Party	* Dmitry Grachev, Deputy Chairman of the Legislative Assembly of Ulyanovsk Oblast (2018–present), Member of the Legislative Assembly (2004–2008, 2013–present) * Yevgeny Lisov, Member of Ulyanovsk City Duma (2025–present) * Timur Sitdikov, lawyer	Registered
Aleksey Russkikh; Communist Party	* Ayrat Gibatdinov, incumbent Senator (2021–present) * Ilya Nozhechkin (United Russia), Chairman of the Ulyanovsk City Duma (2018–present), Member of the City Duma (2014–present) * Nadezhda Petrishcheva, Member of Civic Chamber of Ulyanovsk Oblast	Registered
Yulia Yasaitis; New People	* Marat Aryapov, former Deputy Chairman of the Civic Chamber of Ulyanovsk Oblast * Irina Luchakina, self-employed * Dmitry Rastorguyev, mathematics senior lecturer	Registered

== Finances ==
All sums are in rubles.

Financial Report	Source	Kim	Marinin	Russkikh	Yasaitis
First		20,000	14,200	10,030,000	14,000
Final		TBD	TBD	TBD	TBD

== Results ==
Summary of the 18–20 September 2026 Ulyanovsk Oblast gubernatorial election results
Candidate	Party	Votes	%
Aleksey Russkikh (incumbent)	Communist Party	484,361	77.05
Sergey Marinin	Liberal Democratic Party	54,819	8.72
Marina Kim	A Just Russia	46,001	7.32
Yulia Yasaitis	New People	32,895	5.23
Valid votes		618,076	98.32
Blank ballots		10,566	1.68
Total		628,642	100.00
Turnout		628,642	68.73
Registered voters		914,620	100.00

Governor Russkikh re-appointed incumbent Senator Ayrat Gibatdinov (CPRF) to the Federation Council.

== See also ==
- 2026 Russian regional elections
