= 2021 Ulyanovsk Oblast gubernatorial election =

- 17–19 September 2021
- Turnout: 45.50%
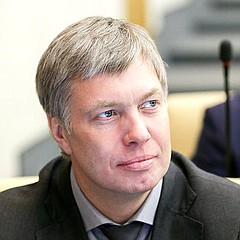
| | | Greens |
| Candidate | Aleksey Russkikh | Gennady Budarin |
| Party | CPRF | The Greens |
| Popular vote | 366,035 | 24,199 |
| Percentage | 83.16% | 5.50% |
Governor before election
Aleksey Russkikh (acting)
CPRF
Elected Governor
Aleksey Russkikh
CPRF

The 2021 Ulyanovsk Oblast gubernatorial election took place on 17–19 September 2021, on common election day, coinciding with election to the State Duma. Acting Governor Aleksey Russkikh was elected for his first full term.

== Background ==
Governor Sergey Morozov was first elected in 2004 and as of 2021 was the longest serving incumbent Russian Governor. Morozov won his last gubernatorial election in 2016 with just 54.34% of the vote, simultaneously his challenger from CPRF Alexey Kurinny won in Ulyanovsk single-mandate constituency. Morozov's narrow win and Kurinny's election to the State Duma prompted speculations about competitive gubernatorial election in 2021.

In March 2021 Governor Sergey Morozov announced his intention to run for fifth term. Alexey Kurinny also signalled he's looking for a rematch with Morozov. However, on 8 April Sergey Morozov announced his resignation and intended to run for State Duma instead. President Vladimir Putin appointed Senator Aleksey Russkikh from Moscow Oblast as acting Governor of Ulyanovsk Oblast. Besides Russkikh, Deputy Minister of Education Denis Gribov and State Duma member, former mayor of Ulyanovsk (2011–2015) Marina Bespalova were under consideration for the governorship. Former Governor Morozov later became Assistant to the Presidential Envoy in the Volga Federal Okrug.

Appointment of Russkikh, a member of CPRF, prevented Alexey Kurinny from running in the gubernatorial election. Governor Russkikh initially offered Kurinny position in the Federation Council to which Kurinny was reluctant. Eventually, Alexey Kurinny was placed in CPRF federal party list as No.14 for the State Duma election. In the gubernatorial election United Russia declined to nominate a candidate and endorsed acting Governor Aleksey Russkikh.

== Candidates ==
Only political parties can nominate candidates for gubernatorial election in Ulyanovsk Oblast, self-nomination is not possible. However, candidate is not obliged to be a member of the nominating party. Candidate for Governor of Ulyanovsk Oblast should be a Russian citizen and at least 30 years old. Candidates for Governor should not have a foreign citizenship or residence permit. Each candidate in order to be registered is required to collect at least 9% of signatures of members and heads of municipalities (141-148 signatures). Also gubernatorial candidates present 3 candidacies to the Federation Council and election winner later appoints one of the presented candidates.

=== Registered candidates ===
- Gennady Budarin (The Greens), Member of Ulyanovsk City Duma
- Svetlana Goreva (New People), head of Centre for the Promotion of Social Initiatives "Tvoy Chas" regional office
- Sergey Marinin (LDPR), Member of State Duma, 2016 gubernatorial candidate
- Aleksey Russkikh (CPRF), acting Governor of Ulyanovsk Oblast, former Senator from Moscow Oblast (2018-2021)

=== Failed to qualify ===
- Margarita Barzhanova (SR-ZP), former Member of State Duma (1999-2007), 2004 gubernatorial runoff candidate
- Mikhail Dolgov (Communists of Russia), Member of Ulyanovsk City Duma
- Ildar Gabitov (Rodina), director for development of LLP "Industrial Engineering Systems", chairman of Rodina regional office
- Oleg Goryachev (Yabloko), former Member of Legislative Assembly of Ulyanovsk Oblast (1996-2008), son of former Ulyanovsk Oblast Governor Yury Goryachev, 2016 gubernatorial candidate

=== Declined ===
- Alexey Kurinny (CPRF), Member of State Duma, 2016 gubernatorial candidate
- Sergey Morozov (United Russia), former governor of Ulyanovsk Oblast (2005–2021)

=== Candidates for the Federation Council ===
Incumbent Senator Vadim Kharlov (Independent) was not renominated.

- Gennady Budarin (The Greens):
  - Margarita Artemova (United Russia), member of Cherdaklinsky District Council of Deputies
  - Andrey Gurin, chairman of The Greens regional office
  - Igor Yuzhalin (United Russia), member of Cherdaklinsky District Council of Deputies
- Svetlana Goreva (New People):
  - Ramilya Basyrova, individual entrepreneur
  - Vyacheslav Ilyukhin, prison officer
  - Valery Musatov, engineer at Ulyanovsk Design Bureau of Instrumentation
- Sergey Marinin (LDPR):
  - Aleksey Medvedev, member of Legislative Assembly of Ulyanovsk Oblast
  - Aleksey Tsibarkov, member of Legislative Assembly of Ulyanovsk Oblast
  - Aleksey Yarkov, member of Legislative Assembly of Ulyanovsk Oblast
- Aleksey Russkikh (CPRF):
  - Ayrat Gibatdinov, Vice Chairman of Legislative Assembly of Ulyanovsk Oblast
  - Dmitry Grachev (LDPR), Vice Chairman of Legislative Assembly of Ulyanovsk Oblast
  - Sergey Ryabukhin (United Russia), Senator of the Federation Council (from the Legislative Assembly of Ulyanovsk Oblast)

== Finances ==
All sums are in rubles.

| Financial Report | Source | Barzhanova | Budarin | Gabitov | Goreva | Goryachev | Marinin | Russkikh |
|---|---|---|---|---|---|---|---|---|
| First | | 15,500 | 16,130 | 20,000 | 30,000 | 0 | 420,000 | 45,100 |
| Final | | 15,500 | 5,232,695 | 20,000 | 1,576,000 | 0 | 1,424,648 | 25,045,100 |

== Polls ==
| Fieldwork date | Polling firm | Russkikh | Marinin | Budarin | Goreva | Undecided | Lead |
|---|---|---|---|---|---|---|---|
| 16 - 23 August 2021 | Рапир | 72% | 8% | 5% | 3% | 12% | 64% |

== Results ==
Summary of the 17-19 September 2021 Ulyanovsk Oblast gubernatorial election results
| Candidate | Party | Votes | % |
|---|---|---|---|
| Aleksey Russkikh (incumbent) | Communist Party | 366,035 | 83.16 |
| Gennady Budarin | The Greens | 24,199 | 5.50 |
| Sergey Marinin | Liberal Democratic Party | 20,904 | 4.75 |
| Svetlana Goreva | New People | 19,935 | 4.53 |
| Valid votes | | 431,073 | 97.94 |
| Blank ballots | | 9,075 | 2.06 |
| Total | | 440,148 | 100.00 |
| Turnout | | 45.50 | 440,148 |
| Registered voters | | 967,259 | 100.00 |

Legislative Assembly of Ulyanovsk Oblast vice chairman Ayrat Gibatdinov (Communist Party) was appointed to the Federation Council replacing incumbent senator Vadim Kharlov (Independent).
