= Forward, Russia! (article) =

2009 news article by Dmitry Medvedev

"Forward, Russia!" is an article by then President of Russia Dmitry Medvedev, published on September 10, 2009 on the news website Gazeta.Ru. In the article, the president outlined his vision for the country's future development and problems to be solved. According to Medvedev, the article is a summary of what he intended to say in his address to the Federal Assembly. Medvedev said (during a meeting of the Valdai Discussion Club) that such an advanced announcement of content to be presented to the Assembly is unprecedented in modern Russia.

The article was not received favorably among the opposition.

== Content ==
In his closing remarks, Medvedev warned of the existence of powers who will try to undermine development, such as corrupt officials and so called entrepreneurs who will try to drain value from the remains of Soviet industry as well as monopolize the nation's natural resources.

Medvedev also noted that the article should not be taken as "a detailed plan, it is an ideology."

== Reception ==
According to Vyacheslav Volodin, Secretary of the Presidium of the General Council of the United Russia party, Dmitry Medvedev's article is "an example of a political message to society" because it is not about macroeconomics or market indicators, but rather, about standard of living for citizens, as well as broaching change in the very relationship between citizens and the state of Russia.

The Mayor of Moscow, Yuriy Luzhkov called the article "a serious and powerful appeal to the whole of society". Sergey Morozov, Governor of Ulyanovsk Oblast, described Medvedev's article in positive terms, considering it to be an honest assessment of problems holding back Russia's development and as well as suggesting difficult yet realistic ways to modernize the nation's economy.

Vitaly Ivanov, director of the Institute of Politics and Public Law, believes that the article puts propagandists of all sorts in their place, and that no revolutions are needed for Russia's future development. Ivanov also said that the article shows that Medvedev is not a "liberal" of any sort.

Analysts with the Carnegie Center in Moscow observed that modernization was the focus of the article, and that it was a powerful call to overcome corruption.

=== Critique by opposition ===
Remarks by Russian political opposition parties and individuals included the following:

- Gennady Zyuganov, leader of the Communist Party of the Russian Federation, was skeptical about the article, commenting that United Russia is not an independent political force but merely "an extension of the presidential administration and the government... incapable of generating ideas, giving sober assessments, conducting a dialogue with society and the opposition, and adjusting its policy." On the part of the Communist Party of the Russian Federation, Zyuganov proposed "the nationalization of the mineral resource base, strategic industries, the introduction of a progressive income tax scale and a state monopoly on alcohol-containing products".
- Garry Kasparov expressed the opinion that "a democratic and prosperous state can only be built without Putin and Medvedev".
- Human rights activist Lev Ponomarev said "This is a kind of liberalism under the protection of the Okhrana... liberalism, because it's kind of like a liberal's manifesto, on the one hand. And on the other hand, there are phrases that betray the true meaning – this liberalism will operate under the control of the special services.".
- Opposition leader Vladimir Milov wrote a commentary on the article titled "Stop, Russia!"
