= Maria Bolshakova =

Russian politician

- Мария Большакова

Governor of Ulyanovsk Oblast (acting)
- In office 29 November 2004 – 6 January 2005
- Preceded by: Vladimir Shamanov; Mikhail Shkanov (acting)
- Succeeded by: Sergey Morozov

Personal details
- Born: Maria Grigoryevna Bolshakova; 13 February 1947 (age 78) Zabaluyka, Inzensky District, Ulyanovsk Oblast, Russian SFSR, Soviet Union

Maria Grigoryevna Bolshakova (Russian: Мария Григорьевна Большакова; born 13 February 1947), is a Russian politician who had served as the acting Governor of Ulyanovsk Oblast from 2004 to 2005.

== Biography ==
Maria Bolshakova was born in Zabaluyka in 1947.

On 22 November 2004, Bolshakova was the acting governor of Ulyanovsk Oblast, until 6 January 2005, where Sergey Ivanovich Morozov, became the 3rd Governor of Ulyanovsk Oblast.

She became an honorary citizen of Ulyanovsk on 31 August 2016.

On 28 January 2021, she had supported the "Year of the Book: Time to Read" was held, organized by the Public Chamber of Ulyanovsk, organized by Governor Morozov, as he signed the document in September 2020.
