= Ulyanovsk State University =

University

- Ульяновский государственный университет
- Motto: "Classical choice"
- Type: Public
- Established: 1988; 38 years ago
- Affiliations: Moscow State University
- President: Yuri Polyanskov
- Rector: Boris Kostishko
- Academic staff: 1,254
- Students: 16,000
- Location: Ulyanovsk, Ulyanovsk Oblast, Russia; 54.300°N 48.370°E
- Campus: Urban
Colours
- Website: Official website
- Building details
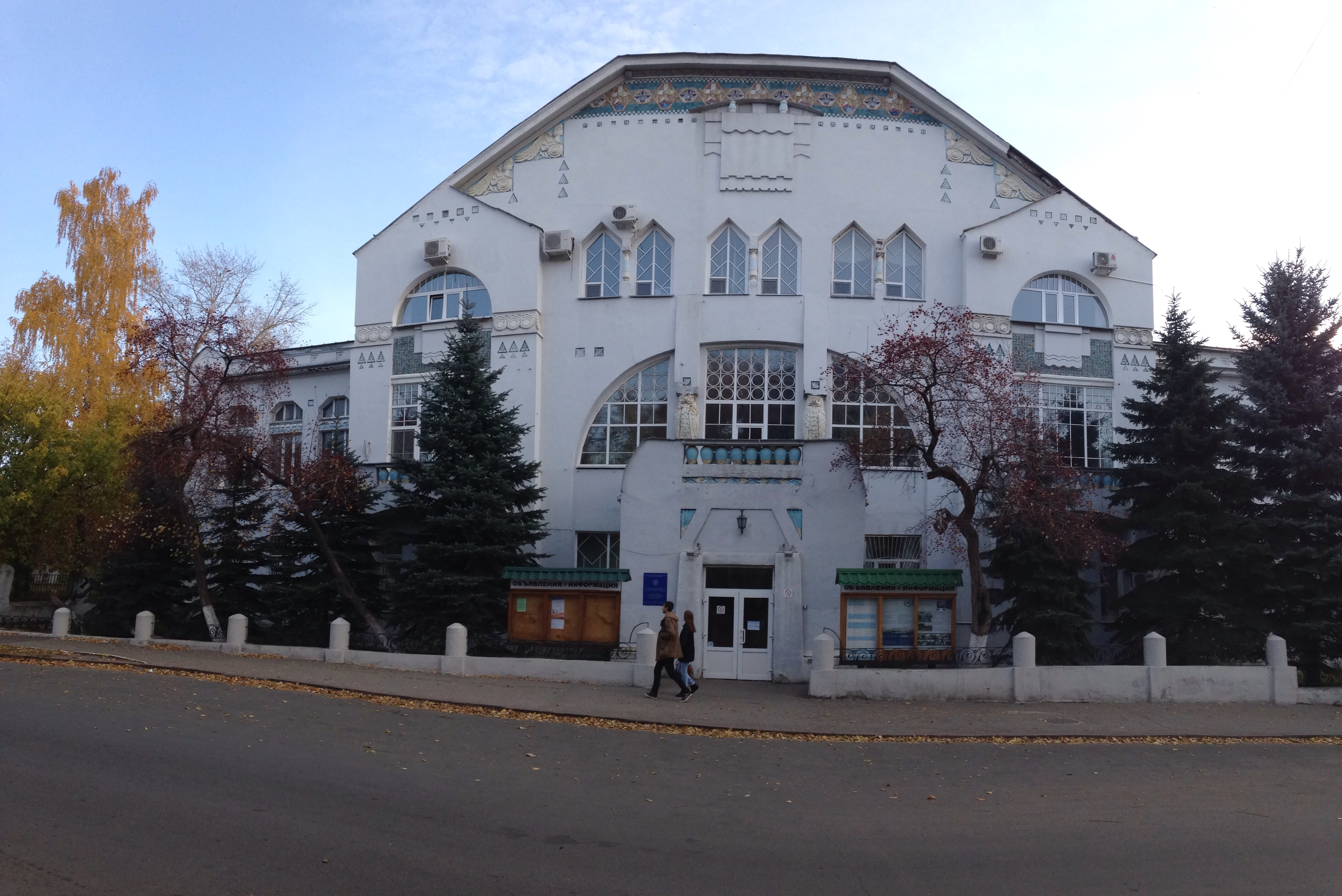
- The Administration Building on Tolstoy Street

University rankings

Regional – Overall
- QS Emerging Europe and Central Asia: 251-300 (2022)

Ulyanovsk State University (Russian: Ульяновский государственный университет, romanized: Ulyanovskiy gosudarstvennyy universitet) (USU) is a public, research university, located in Ulyanovsk, Russia—the birthplace of Vladimir Lenin. The city of Ulyanovsk (formerly Simbirsk, founded in 1648) is situated on the Volga River, about 710 kilometres (440 mi) east of Moscow and has a population of 700,000. The university enrolls some 16,000 students in six colleges offering 68 majors and claims considerable international ties. USU was one of the first among Russian universities to join the Bologna process to reform its Doctoral, Master's and Bachelor's degrees.

USU was established as a part of Moscow State University in Ulyanovsk Oblast, based on the traditions of classical education, by a resolution of Government of the Soviet Union in 1988. It was formerly Simbirsk People's University, established in 1648. In 1996, the Ulyanovsk affiliate of MSU was reorganized into Ulyanovsk State University. At present, Ulyanovsk State University comprises six institutes, 7 independent faculties, 2 affiliates, 6 learning centres, and many international study centers.

The university enrolls about 16,000 students, among them almost 200 foreign citizens from Europe, Asia, Africa, North America, and South America. Currently, the university employs 1,254 faculty members, including 138 Doctorate and 623 Candidate of Science degree holders.

Ulyanovsk State University offers a wide range of study options: full and part-time, external, further and distance education programs on undergraduate, graduate and post-graduate levels. A student may choose from 77 majors, 67 post-graduate, 37 medical internship and medical residency programs. In addition, the university provides an opportunity to receive dual degrees in Law and Business. The Ulyanovsk State University Business School also offers MBA degree with focus on international business and finance.

== General information ==
USU offers a wide range of study options: full and part-time, external, extended, distance education programs on undergraduate, graduate and post-graduate levels. There are 68 majors, 66 post-graduate, 29 residency training, and 14 internship programs available.

== Academics ==
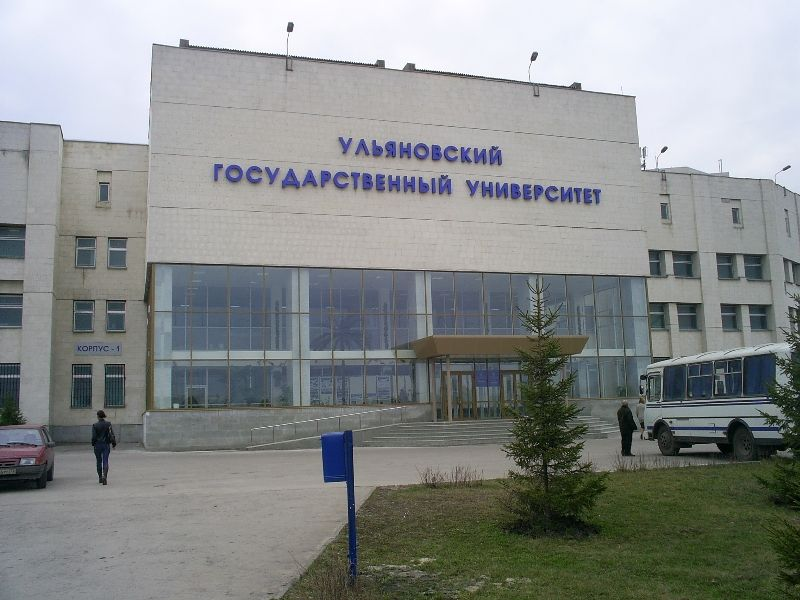
Entrance to the Main Sviyaga Campus

- Institute of Economics and Business Administration, Top Russian Business School (Note: ""Ekspert RA" publikuyet spiski luchshikh vuzov po podgotovke "tekhnarey" i ekonomistov" «Эксперт РА» публикует списки лучших вузов по подготовке «технарей» и экономистов ["Expert RA" publishes lists of the best universities for the training of "techies" and economists] (in Russian). 2014-10-01.)
- Russian-American Faculty
- Russian-German Faculty
- Faculty of Physics and Engineering
- Faculty of Mathematics and Information Technology
- Institute of Law and Public Service
- Institute of Medicine and Ecology
- Faculty of Humanities
- Faculty of Culture and Arts

== Public organizations ==
For over 10 years, USU has enjoyed a strong relationship with the German-Russian Friendship Society in Ulyanovsk's sister-city Krefeld. The German partners have offered generous financial, material and technical assistance and helped arrange internships for USU students with major German companies. For several years, USU has provided translation assistance to city administrations of Ulyanovsk and Krefeld, which exchange regular visits as part of their collaboration.

Since 1997, USU has maintained a relationship with the Russia Culture Center in (Seoul, South Korea).

Among developments is participation in Oxford Russia Fund program, which provided 75 scholarships for USU humanities majors for the 2006–2007 academic year.

To promote academic exchanges, USU arranges regular meetings with coordinators of international educational organizations including ACTR-ACCELS, IREX, Fulbright Foundation.

== Research ==
Research at USU is conducted by all academic units — institutes and faculties, each having at least one research team. The principal research areas addressed by USU scholars are: nuclear power engineering, aerospace industry, laser and nanotechnologies, general and specific engineering, automobile manufacturing, microelectronics and machine engineering,

USU faculty engaged in medical research are participants of the anti-tobacco campaign launched by European Respiratory Society.

A number of research projects in the field of mathematics and Information Technology are being implemented in cooperation with Jyvaskyla University (Finland) and Texas Tech University (USA).

USU research center in sociology "Region" has, since 1993, worked in close partnership with the University of Birmingham, implementing among other things regular post-graduate student exchanges. Besides Great Britain, "Region" staff enjoy internship opportunities with partner institutions in Germany, Italy, Belgium.

== Partners ==
One of the top USU priorities is developing and carrying out joint educational programs in cooperation with a number of universities and colleges from the United States, Germany, India and China.

From the last three years, the exchanges have provided study abroad opportunities to almost 100 students from Russian-American Faculty and Russian-German Faculty.

Over the last two years, USU has signed cooperative agreements with the University of Palermo, Hochschule Niederrhein (Germany), Masaryk University (Czech Republic), Utemisov West-Kazakhstan State University (Republic of Kazakhstan).

In April 2012, USU signed an agreement for a joint Russian-Indian International MBA Program with Jaro Institute of Technology, Management and Research (Mumbai). JARO Education is a company which provides services in the field of education, including professional and vocational training and development in India and across the world via web-based and classroom-based instruction.

List of Partner Universities

Belarus

- Belarus State University
- Francysk Skaryna Homiel State University
- Hrodna State University

Bulgaria

- Shumen University
- Technical University of Gabrovo

China

- Hunan Normal University
- Jiangnan University
- Heilongjiang University
- Zhengzhou University

Czech Republic

- Czech Technical University in Prague
- Masaryk University
- The University of Economics, Prague

Germany

- Niederrhein University of Applied Sciences
- Freiberg University of Mining and Technology
- Duisburg-Essen University
- University of Osnabrück

India

- Jaro Institute of Technology, Management and Research

Italy

- University of Palermo
- Nuova Accademia di Belle Arti, Milan

Kazakhstan

- Karaganda State Technical University
- Taraz State Pedagogical Institute
- West Kazakhstan State University

Lithuania

- Mykolas Romeris University

Mongolia

- Mongolian University of Science and Technology

Poland

- Silesian University of Technology

South Korea

- Daegu University

Turkey

- Ahi Evran University

Vietnam

- University of Labor and Social Affairs

Ukraine

- Oles Honchar Dnipropetrovsk National University
- Diplomatic Academy of Ukraine

United States

- East Tennessee State University
- La Grange College
- Shenandoah University
- Wesleyan College

UAE

- London American City College

Uzbekistan

- Tashkent Pediatric Medical Institute

== International Saint-Exupéry Centre ==
Faculty of Culture and Arts

On 27 February 2012, the university inaugurated its new International Saint-Exupéry Centre, led by its director, Elena Mironova, an associate professor of French. The center will serve as a permanent museum dedicated to the French author-aviator Antoine de Saint-Exupéry, as well as a cultural and linguistics center for the university. The museum was established with the assistance of Civil Aviation College teacher Nikolai Yatsenko, an author of 12 publications on Saint-Exupéry who personally donated some 6,000 related items. The university's new center will also help support the study of international languages. The opening was attended by Ulyanovsk Governor Sergey Morozov, Sergey Krasnov of the Ulyanovsk Civil Aviation College and other aerospace and academic dignitaries, as well as Veronique Jober, Sorbonne professor of Slavic languages, addressing the audience by video link from Paris. (Note: "USU Opens International Saint-Exupery Center". Ulyanovsk State University. 2012-02-28.)

== International students ==
The first international students were enrolled in USU undergraduate study programs in 1991, in residency training programs in 1999, and post-graduate programs in 2004. At the moment, USU enrolls about 120 international students from 25 countries.
