= Alexey Kornienko (politician) =

Russian politician

Alexey Kornienko MP
- Алексей Корниенко
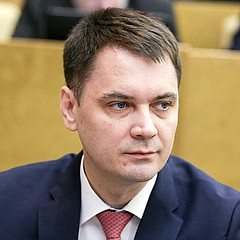

Member of the State Duma (Party List Seat)
- Incumbent
- Assumed office 24 December 2007

Personal details
- Born: 22 July 1976 (age 48); Namangan, Uzbek SSR, USSR
- Political party: Communist Party of the Russian Federation
- Education: Ulyanovsk State Agricultural Academy; Russian University of Innovation; Russian Human Resources Academy for the Agro-Industrial Complex

Alexey Victorovich Kornienko (Russian: Алексей Викторович Корниенко; born 22 July 1976, in Namangan) is a Russian political figure and a deputy of the 5th, 6th, 7th, and 8th State Dumas.

In 2002, he started working as an assistant and then as a senior lecturer at the Ulyanovsk State Agricultural Academy. The same year, he joined the Communist Party of the Russian Federation. In 2003, he started working in the apparatus of the State Duma. In 2006, he taught at the Moscow Finance and Law Academy. On 2 December 2007 he was elected deputy of the 5th State Duma. In 2011, 2016, and 2021, he was re-elected deputy of the 6th, 7th, and 8th State Dumas, respectively.
