= Ayrat Gibatdinov =

Russian politician (born 1986)

- Айрат Гибатдинов
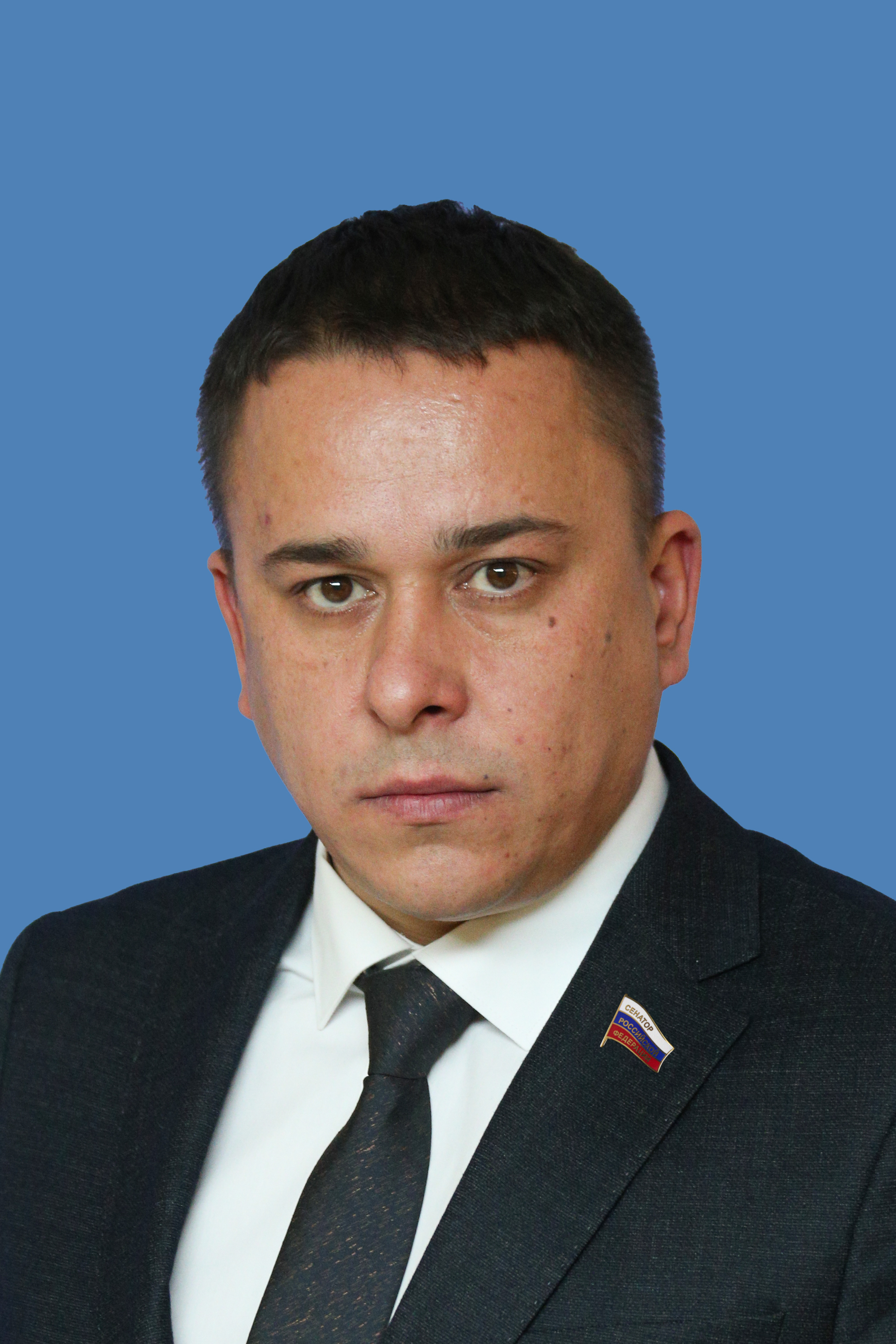

Senator from Ulyanovsk Oblast
- Incumbent
- Assumed office 5 October 2021
- Preceded by: Vadim Kharlov

Personal details
- Born: Ayrat Gibatdinov; 16 January 1986 (age 40) Ulyanovsk, Russian Soviet Federative Socialist Republic, Soviet Union
- Party: Communist Party of the Russian Federation
- Education: Ulyanovsk State Agricultural Academy

Ayrat Minerasikhovich Gibatdinov (Russian: Айрат Минерасихович Гибатдинов; born 16 January 1986) is a Russian politician serving as a senator from Ulyanovsk Oblast since 5 October 2021.

== Career ==
Ayrat Gibatdinov was born on 16 January 1986 in Ulyanovsk. In 2008, he graduated from the Ulyanovsk State Agricultural Academy. After graduation and until 2014, he was the general director of the trading company "Master". From 2013 to 2021, he served as deputy of the Legislative Assembly of Ulyanovsk Oblast of the 5th and 6th convocations. On 5 October 2021, he became the senator from Ulyanovsk Oblast.

== Sanctions ==
Ayrat Gibatdinov is under personal sanctions introduced by the European Union, the United Kingdom, the USA, Canada, Switzerland, Australia, Ukraine, New Zealand, for ratifying the decisions of the "Treaty of Friendship, Cooperation and Mutual Assistance between the Russian Federation and the Donetsk People's Republic and between the Russian Federation and the Luhansk People's Republic" and providing political and economic support for Russia's annexation of Ukrainian territories.
