= Sergey Ryabukhin =

Russian politician (born 1954)

- Сергей Рябухин
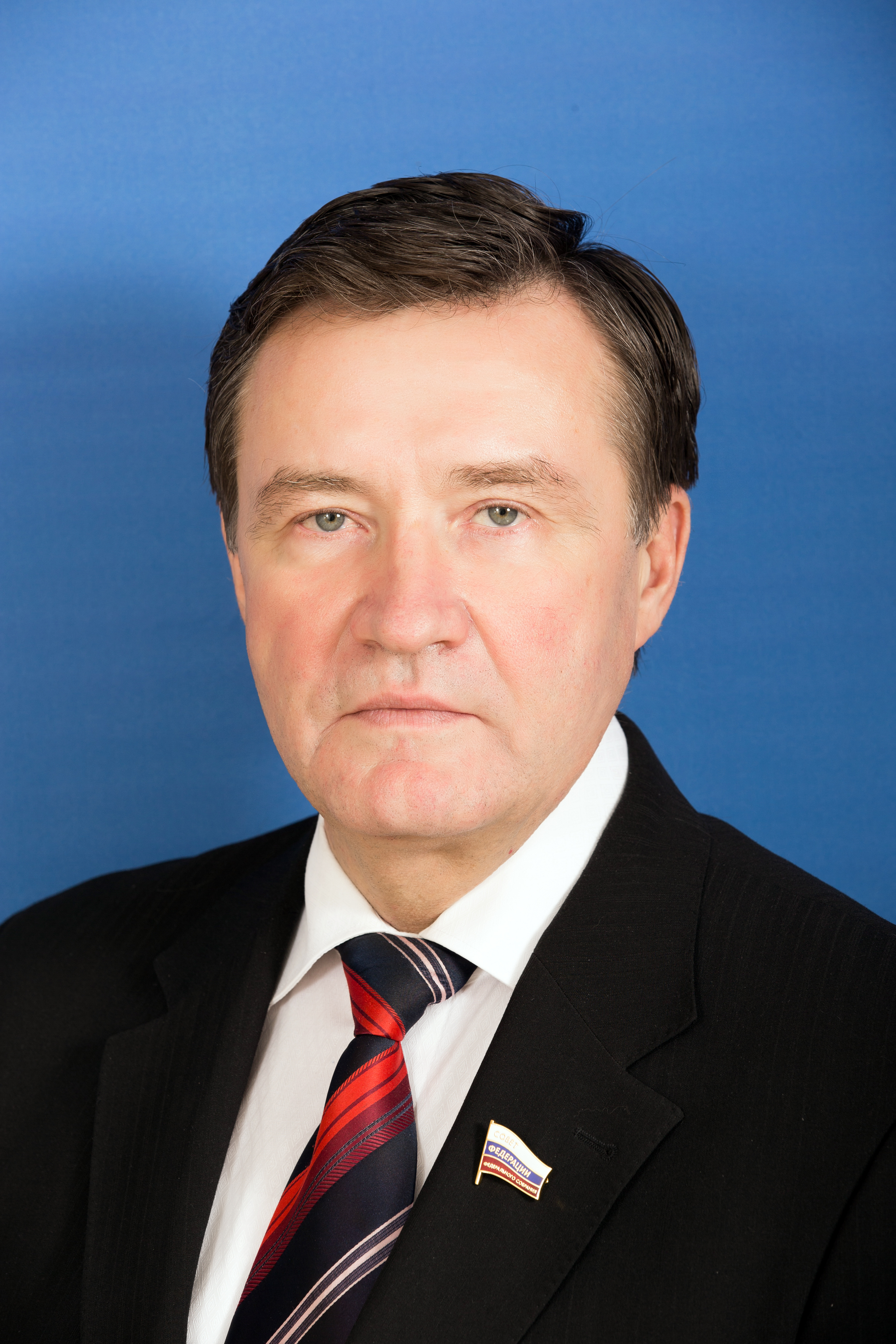

Senator from Ulyanovsk Oblast
- Incumbent
- Assumed office 20 September 2018
- Preceded by: Sergey Bazhanov

Personal details
- Born: Sergey Ryabukhin; 13 November 1954 (age 71) Volsk, Saratov Oblast, Russian Soviet Socialist Republic, Soviet Union
- Party: United Russia
- Education: Ulyanovsk State Technical University, Financial University under the Government of the Russian Federation

Sergey Nikolayevich Ryabukhin (Russian: Сергей Николаевич Рябухин; born 13 November 1954) is a Russian politician serving as a senator from Ulyanovsk Oblast since 20 September 2018.

== Biography ==
Sergey Ryabukhin was born on 13 November 1954 in Volsk, Saratov Oblast. In 1984, he graduated from the Ulyanovsk State Technical University. From 1973 to 1975, he did military service at the Baikonur Cosmodrome. From 1979 to 1990, Ryabukhin was the electrician, engineer, and chief power engineer of the large-panel housing construction plant of the Ulyanovsk housebuilding plant. From 1992 to 1996, he was the Head of the Department of Foreign Economic Relations of the Administration of the Ulyanovsk Region. In December 1995, he was elected deputy of the Legislative Assembly of Ulyanovsk Oblast of the 1st convocation. From 1996 to 2001, he was the senator from the Legislative Assembly of Ulyanovsk Oblast. On 8 September 2013, he was elected deputy of the Legislative Assembly of Ulyanovsk Oblast of the 5th convocation from the United Russia. On 20 September 2013 he again became the senator from the Legislative Assembly of Ulyanovsk Oblast. In 2019, Ryabukhin got re-elected for the same position.

=== Sanctions ===
Sergey Ryabukhin is under personal sanctions introduced by the European Union, the United Kingdom, the USA, Canada, Switzerland, Australia, Ukraine, New Zealand, for ratifying the decisions of the "Treaty of Friendship, Cooperation and Mutual Assistance between the Russian Federation and the Donetsk People's Republic and between the Russian Federation and the Luhansk People's Republic" and providing political and economic support for Russia's annexation of Ukrainian territories.
