= Mikhail Avdeev (politician) =

Russian politician

Mikhail Avdeev MP
- Михаил Авдеев
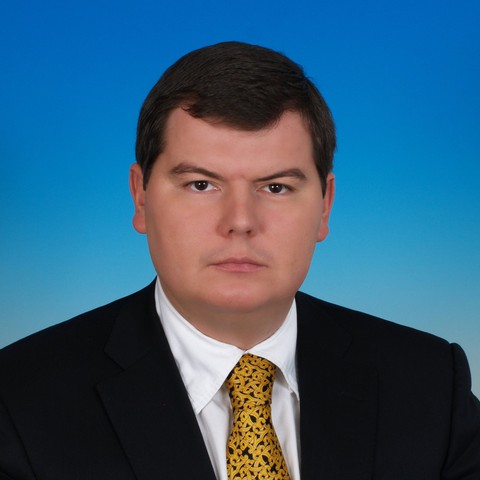

Member of the State Duma (Party List Seat)
- Incumbent
- Assumed office 12 October 2021
- In office 3 October 2018 – 22 January 2020
- Preceded by: Aleksey Russkikh
- Succeeded by: Boris Ivanyuzhenkov
- In office 21 December 2011 – 5 October 2016

Personal details
- Born: 6 March 1977 (age 49) Moscow, RSFSR, USSR
- Party: CPRF
- Education: Moscow Consumer Cooperative University; Russian Academy of Public Administration

Mikhail Yurievich Avdeev (Note: surname also transliterated as Avdeyev) (Russian: Михаил Юрьевич Авдеев) is a Russian politician, who, since 2011, has been a deputy in the State Duma as part of the Communist Party of the Russian Federation (CPRF) electoral list. As a member of the Duma, he currently sits on the Committee on Construction, Housing, and Communal Services, as well as the Commission on Ensuring Housing Rights of Citizens.

== Biography ==
Born 6 March 1977 in Moscow. In 1998 graduated with an honors degree in marketing from Moscow University of Consumer Cooperatives. After graduation, he held various managerial positions at companies in the Moscow region. In 2010, he graduated with honors, majoring in law, from the Russian Presidential Academy of National Economy and Public Administration.

In 2007, he was elected a deputy of the Moscow Oblast Duma as a member of the Communist Party. He served as Chairman of the Committee on Economic and Innovation Policy. In December 2011 he was elected to the State Duma of Russia, representing the Moscow Oblast. In the State Duma he served as deputy chairman of the Committee on Land Relations and Construction. He headed the Expert Council on Land Relations under the committee. He currently holds the position of First Deputy Chairman of the Committee on Transport and Construction. He is also a member of the Central Committee of the Communist Party.

In September 2018, Deputy Aleksey Russkikh was appointed to the Federation Council and resigned his mandate in the 7th State Duma. The mandate then transferred to Avdeev, who assumed office on 3 October 2018.

He announced his intention to resign from the Duma on 6 December 2019. On 22 January 2020, the State Duma terminated Avdeev's parliamentary powers in accordance with his resignation.

The next year in September 2021, Avdeev was once again elected to the 8th State Duma, where he now serves on the Committee on Construction, Housing, and Communal Services, as well as the Commission on Ensuring Housing Rights of Citizens.

== Legislative action ==
From 2011 to 2019, during the exercise of the powers of a deputy of the State Duma of the VI and VII convocations, he co-authored 21 legislative initiatives and amendments to draft federal laws.

== Awards, bonuses, other distinctions ==
Awarded:

- Certificate of Honor of the President of the Russian Federation
- The honorary sign of the State Duma "For Merits in the Development of Parliamentarism"
- Certificate of Honor of the State Duma
- Certificate of Merit of the Moscow Regional Duma
- Sign of the Governor of the Moscow Region "Thank you"
- Badge of the Governor of the Moscow Region "For Useful"
- The badge of honor of the Moscow Regional Duma "For contribution to the development of legislation"
- Badge of Honor of the Moscow Regional Duma "For Works"
