= Governor of Ulyanovsk Oblast =

Highest-ranking official in Ulyanovsk Oblast, Russia

- Standard of the Governor

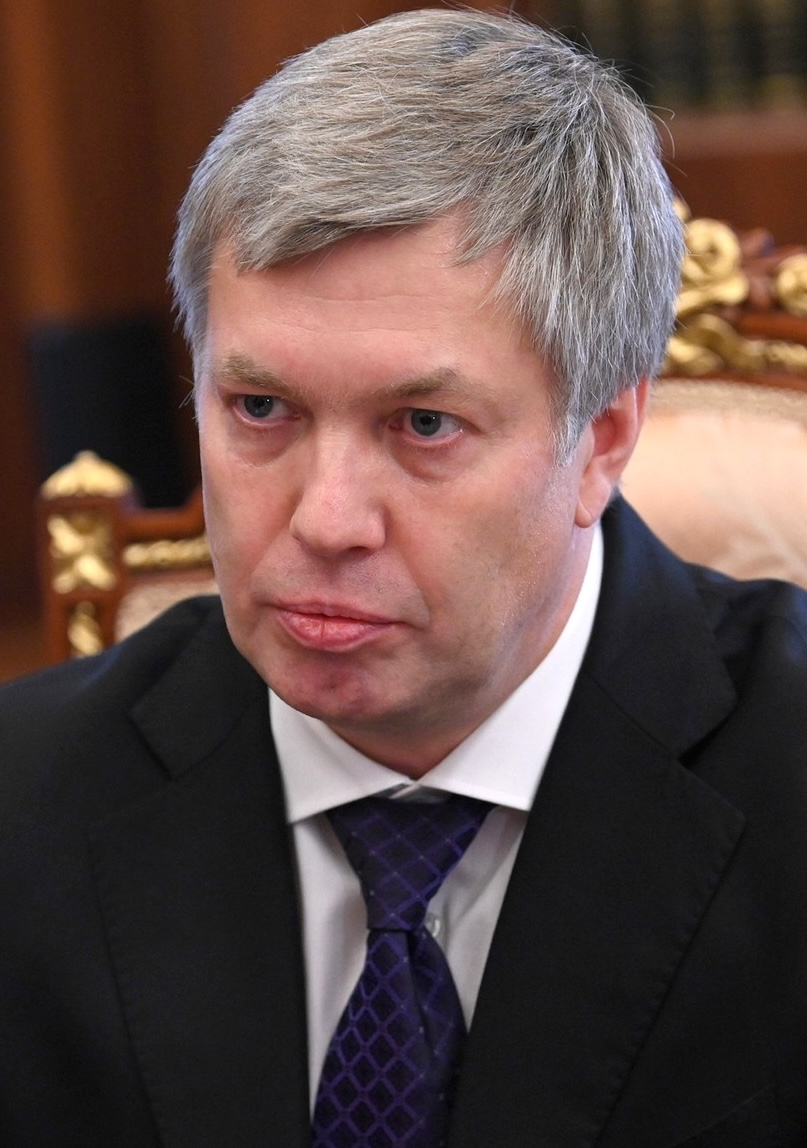
- Incumbent; Aleksey Russkikh since 4 October 2021
- Seat: Ulyanovsk
- Term length: 5 years
- Constituting instrument: Charter of Ulyanovsk Oblast, Section 3
- Formation: 1991
- Website: ulgov.ru

The Governor of Ulyanovsk Oblast (Russian: Губернатор Ульяновской области) is the head of government of Ulyanovsk Oblast, a federal subject of Russia.

== History of office ==
The position of the Head of Administration was introduced in late 1991. Valentin Malafeyev, director of "Contactor" electrical equipment plant, was named the first post-Soviet leader of Ulyanovsk Oblast. He failed to gain any support from local elites, and as a result, the former communist party functionary Yury Goryachev was appointed instead. Goryachev's administration ensured a smooth transition to market economy. In December 1996 Goryachev won the first gubernatorial election in the region, distancing both from Kremlin and from communists. Four years later Goryachev was defeated by lieutenant general Vladimir Shamanov, then-commander of the 58th Army. In 2005 mayor of Dimitrovgrad Sergey Morozov became the next governor. In March 2006 the title of office was formally changed from Head of Administration to Governor of Ulyanovsk Oblast.

== List of officeholders ==
No.	Image	Governor	Tenure	Time in office	Party	Election
–		Valentin Malafeyev (born 1938)	24 October 1991 – 2 November 1991 (suspended)	9 days	Independent	Appointed
Until 10 January 1992 Oleg Kazarov continued as chairman of Ulyanovsk Oblast executive committee.
1		Yury Goryachev (1938–2010)	10 January 1992 – 6 January 2001 (lost re-election)	8 years, 362 days	Independent	Appointed 1996
2		Vladimir Shamanov (born 1957)	6 January 2001 – 22 November 2004 (resigned)	3 years, 321 days	Independent → United Russia	2000
–		Mikhail Shkanov (born 1955)	22 November 2004 – 29 November 2004 (resigned to run for a full term)	7 days	Communist	Acting
–		Maria Bolshakova (born 1947)	29 November 2004 – 6 January 2005 (successor took office)	38 days	Independent	Acting
3		Sergey Morozov (born 1959)	6 January 2005 – 7 April 2016 (term end)	16 years, 92 days	United Russia	2004; 2006 (Note: Appointed by the president of Russia with the consent of the Legislative Assembly of Ulyanovsk Oblast.); 2011
–		Sergey Morozov (born 1959)	7 April 2016 – 1 October 2016	16 years, 92 days	United Russia	Acting
(3)		Sergey Morozov (born 1959)	1 October 2016 – 8 April 2021 (resigned)	16 years, 92 days	United Russia	2016
–		Aleksey Russkikh (born 1968)	8 April 2021 – 4 October 2021	5 years, 193 days	Communist	Acting
4		Aleksey Russkikh (born 1968)	4 October 2021 – present	5 years, 193 days	Communist	2021; 2026

== Sources ==
- Ivanov, Vitaly (2019). Глава субъекта Российской Федерации. История губернаторов. Том I. Книга I [Head of the subject of the Russian Federation. History of governors. Vol. I, book I] (in Russian). ISBN 978-5-907250-14-7.
