= Ulyanovsk State Technical University =

Technical university in Ulyanovsk, Russia

Ulyanovsk State Technical University (UlSTU)
- Ульяновский государственный технический университет
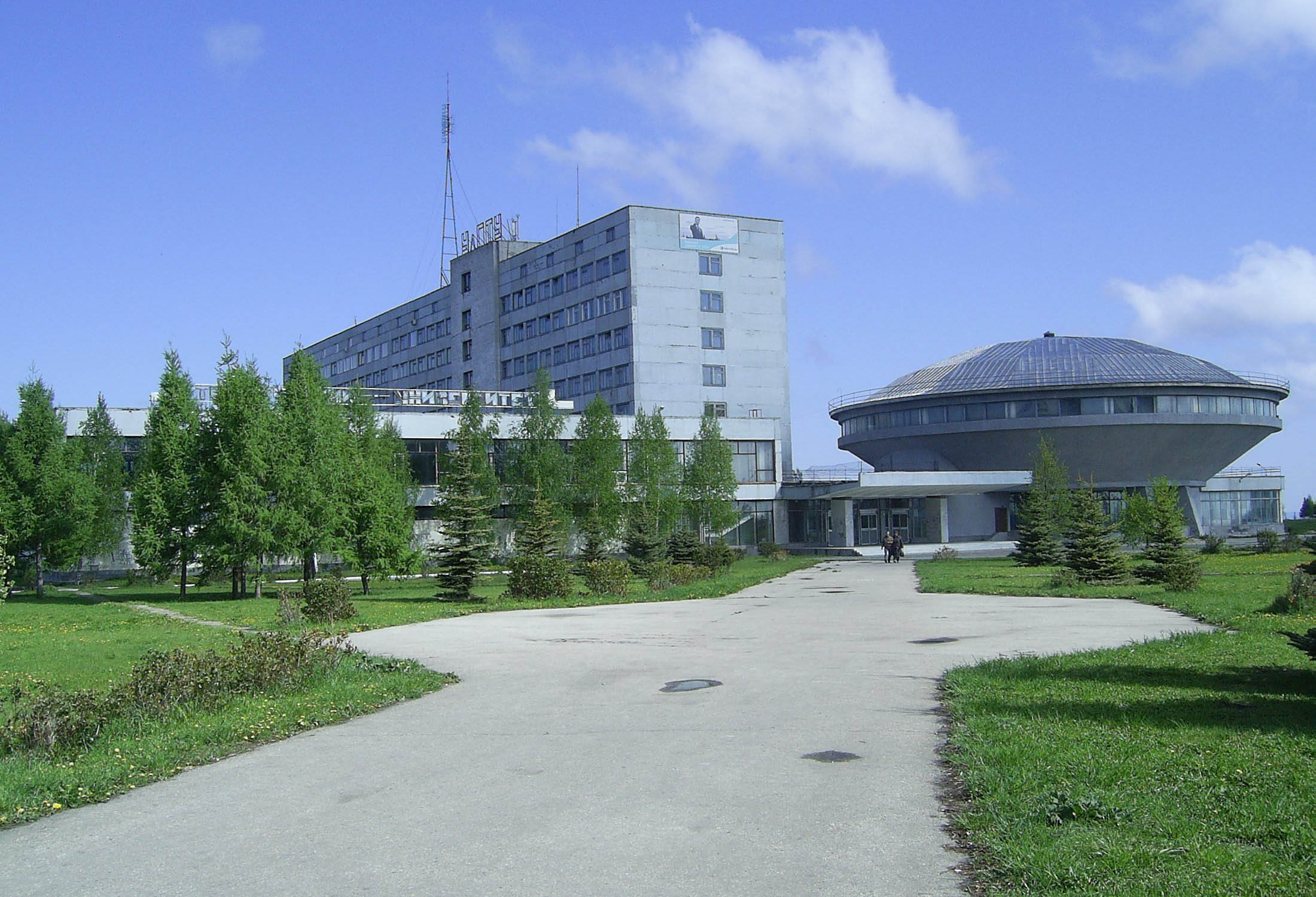
- Other names: УлГТУ
- Established: September 18, 1957
- Rector: Nadezhda Yarushkina
- Students: 10,000
- Location: 32 Severny Venets Str., Ulyanovsk, Ulyanovsk Oblast, Russia; 54°21′04″N 48°23′23″E
- Campus: Urban
- Website: http://ulstu.ru

Ulyanovsk State Technical University (Russian: Ульяновский государственный технический университет, abbreviated as UlSTU) is a technical higher education and research institution in Ulyanovsk. Founded in 1957 as Ulyanovsk Polytech University, the university is located in the Volga River region.

Today Ulyanovsk State Technical University has over 12,000 students in different educational programs at 12 faculties and 48 departments; more than 500 tutors, 42 Ph.D. professors and 250 PhD associate professors.

The university maintains contacts with more than 60 state, public and educational organizations of many countries: universities, research centers, foundations. UlSTU cooperates with such educational and scientific centers as Darmstadt University of Applied Sciences, Germany; Durham University, Great Britain; University of Göttingen, Germany.

Sporting facilities, a calendar of social events and a reputation for teaching makes UlSTU a place to study. Students from Ukraine, Kazakhstan, Germany, China, Vietnam, Turkey, Ghana, Cameroon, and Nigeria study at the university.

- Three institutes, including: International Institute, Institute of Aviation Technologies and Management, Institute of Distance and Additional Education;
- Twelve faculties, including: pre-university training faculty, faculty of humanities, extramural education faculty, engineering and economics faculty, engineering faculty, mechanical engineering faculty, radio engineering faculty, aircraft construction faculty, civil engineering faculty, faculty of information systems and technologies, faculty of high professional education, power engineering faculty;
- One branch, colleges, academies, educational and research centers, and other departments.

== History ==
The story of the Ulyanovsk State Technical University begins in 1957 when on September 18 the Polytechnical institute was founded. In 1993 it received its present official name, Ulyanovsk State Technical University.

== Faculties and institutes ==
=== Faculty of humanities ===
- Publishing
- Advertising and public relations
- Linguistics

=== Engineering and economics faculty ===
- Quality management
- Systems analysis and process control
- Innovation studies
- Economics
- Management
- Human resource management
- State and municipal management
- Commerce

=== Faculty of information systems and technologies ===
- Applied mathematics
- Information and computer sciences
- Information systems and technologies
- Applied informatics
- Software engineering

=== Power engineering faculty ===
- Heat and power engineering

=== Radio engineering faculty ===
- Radio engineering

=== International institute ===
- Oil and gas engineering

== Students and staff ==
The university offers pre-university training for foreign students.

== International relations ==
UlSTU extends international relations by cooperating with universities and research centers from Germany, the US, Austria, China, Japan, Poland, Bulgaria, and Italy. Friendship and joint scientific and research activities with Hochschule Darmstadt for over 10 years is the pride of the Polytech. Today 18,000 students (including international) study at UlSTU.

The university develops international activities and cooperates with educational and scientific centers in Germany, China, the Czech Republic, the US, Austria, Japan, Poland, Bulgaria, etc.

== Facts and figures ==
- More than 8,000 students, including more than 450 foreign students from 35 countries
- Three institutes and twelve faculties
- 52 departments, 81 programs of study
- More than 500 teachers, including 42 professors, doctors of sciences, about 250 associate professors, candidates of sciences, more than 50 members and corresponding members of industry academies
- Library, with about 1,200,000 books, magazines, electronic publications, video materials and other information sources;
- 84 buildings and structures, including eight educational buildings
