= Marina Kim =

Russian journalist, actress (born 1983)

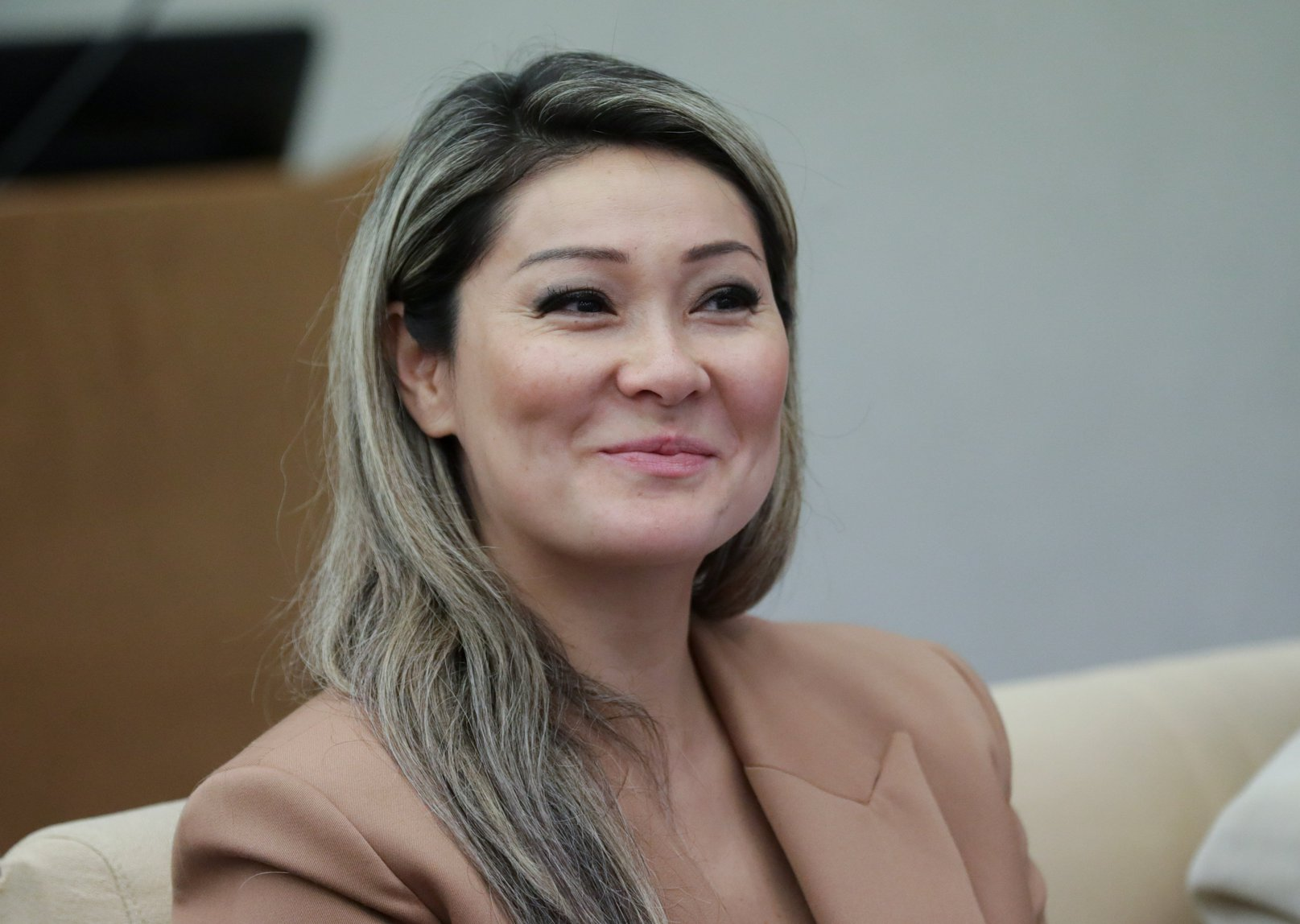
- Born: 11 August 1983 (age 43); Leningrad, Russian SFSR, Soviet Union
- Citizenship: Russian
- Education: Moscow State Institute of International Relations
- Occupations: Television presenter, journalist, actress

Marina Yevgenevna Kim (Russian: Марина Евгеньевна Ким, born on 11 August 1983) is a Russian television presenter and actress of mixed Russian-Korean origin.

== Early life ==
Kim was born in Leningrad, Russian SFSR, Soviet Union in southern Saint Petersburg, Russia. Her father, a Korean who grew up in Kabardino-Balkaria, a Russian mother, grew up in the Baltics. In her childhood she was fond of choreography, since 16 years she worked as a model, was shot in music videos.

After graduation, Marina entered the Saint Petersburg State University at the Faculty of International Relations (specialty "regional specialist, specialist in European studies"), where she studied two courses. In Marina moved to Moscow, transferred to the Moscow State Institute of International Relations (University) of the Ministry of Foreign Affairs of the Russian Federation to the Faculty of International Relations, received a diploma in North American Studies. Thesis work - "Factors of growth in the US economy during the presidency of Bill Clinton." Practiced at the Committee on International Affairs of the Federation Council and the Institute of the USA and Canada. She graduated from TV presenter courses at the Institute for Advanced Training of Radio and Television Workers. In the fifth year MGIMO began a television career.

In 2004, became the leading program "Markets" on the business channel "RBK TV", where she specialized in the analysis of Asian stock indices.

In 2007, she began to work on the "Vesti" program on the "Rossiya" TV channel on the leading broadcasts to the Far East, then on the morning and daily issues of the program. Since September 2008, led the evening issues of "Vesti" at 20:00 in conjunction with Ernest Mackevičius.

== Career ==
She had lead roles in the films Serko (2006) and "Bishkek, I Love You!" (2011). In 2014, she began hosting the television programme Good Morning (Russian: Доброе утро) on Channel One.

In August 2017, she filmed a series of short reports about life in North Korea for the Good Morning program, which talked about the relatively good life of its population. In January 2018, she worked as a correspondent for Channel One information programs at the Davos Economic Forum, in March of the same year she worked during the counting of votes in the presidential elections.

From September 3, 2018 to July 4, 2020 - moderator of the talk show "Big Game" on Channel One. She continued to act as a story writer, working during the visit of North Korean leader Kim Jong Un to Vladivostok in April 2019. She also interviewed entrepreneur Oleksandr Onyshchenko (December 28, 2019) and director Oliver Stone (December 14, 2020).

On December 20, 2018, she took part in the annual press conference of Vladimir Putin.

In the spring of 2021, she became a member of the A Just Russia — For Truth party. Secretary of the Presidium of the Central Council of the Party for Information Policy, member of the Presidium of the Central Council. In May 2021, she announced plans to nominate herself for the election of the governor of the Khabarovsk Territory. In the elections held on September 19, she took second place, losing to Mikhail Degtyarev.

== Personal life ==
Marina Kim is unmarried and has two daughters. In the beginning of 2015, it was rumored she was dating Brett Ratner whom she met in the Antilles in 2011.
