= Aleksey Russkikh =

Russian politician

- Алексей Русских
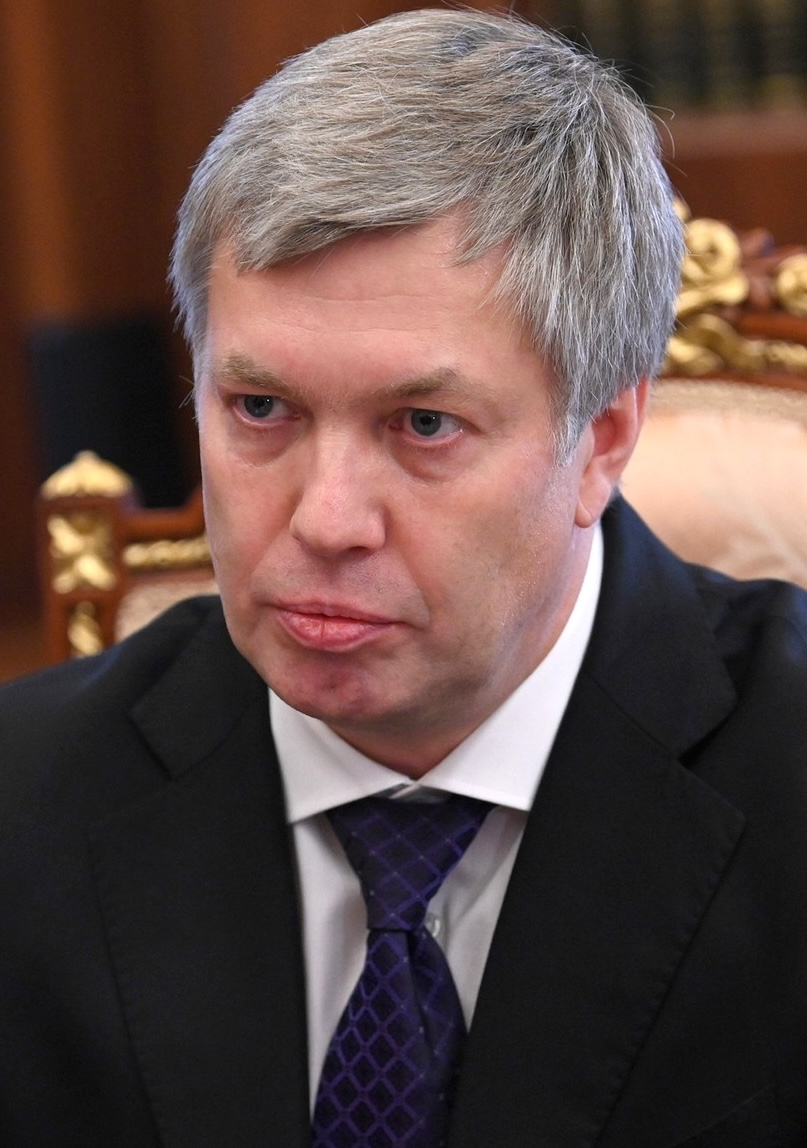
- Russkikh in 2021

4th Governor of Ulyanovsk Oblast
- Incumbent
- Assumed office 4 October 2021; Acting: 8 April 2021 - 4 October 2021
- Preceded by: Sergey Morozov

Senator from Moscow Oblast
- In office 17 September 2018 – 8 April 2021
- Preceded by: Yury Lipatov
- Succeeded by: Olga Zabralova

Member of the State Duma
- In office 13 December 2007 – 17 September 2018

Personal details
- Born: Aleksey Yuryevich Russkikh; 17 July 1968 (age 58) Izhevsk, Russian SFSR, Soviet Union
- Party: Communist Party
- Spouse: Olga Russkikha
- Children: 2
- Aleksey Russkikh's voice Russkikh on his support for the Russo-Ukrainian War; Recorded 16 March 2022

Aleksey Yuryevich Russkikh (Russian: Алексей Юрьевич Русских; born 17 July 1968), is a Russian statesman and politician who is currently the Governor of the Ulyanovsk Oblast since 8 April 2021. He is a member of the Communist Party.

Previously Russkikh served as Senator from Moscow Oblast from 2018 to 2021 and a member of the State Duma from 2007 to 2018.

He is a candidate of Economic Sciences in 2002.

On 2 July 2009, he was awarded the title of Honorary Citizen of the Poshekhonsky District of the Yaroslavl Oblast.

He was the member of the board of the non-profit partnership "National Association of Organizations of Expertise in Construction" (NOEKS).

== Biography ==
Aleksey Russkikh was born in Izhvesk, 17 July 1968 to a family of engineers.

=== Early life ===
He graduated from high school with a gold medal. In 1991, he graduated with honors from the mechanical engineering faculty of the Moscow State Technical University, NE Bauman with a degree in electrical engineering.

=== Career in enterprises ===
From 1992 to 2002, he held managerial positions at various enterprises, including the position of Deputy Director for Supply and Sales of the Novosibirsk Metallurgical Plant named after V.I. Kuzmin, which was a member of the Estar group of companies.

In 2002, he graduated from the Academy of National Economy under the Government of Russia with a degree in finance and credit, and hold a PhD in Economics (dissertation topic: "Investments of Russian enterprises abroad").

Until 2007, he worked as the Director for Economics and Finance of the State Unitary Enterprise of the Moscow Region for the implementation of new technologies, materials and equipment "Dorprogress" (State Unitary Enterprise MO "Dorprogress"), which was under the jurisdiction of the State Institution of the Moscow Oblast "Management of highways of the Moscow region" Mosavtodor ". The enterprise was located in the village of Proletarsky, Serpukhov district. Dmitry Filippov was the general director.

=== Member of the State Duma ===
As Russkih himself says in his autobiography on his website, since 2003, he "began to actively cooperate with the Moscow regional branch of the Communist Party."

==== 5th convocation ====
In the fall of 2007, the elections to the State Duma of the 5th convocation were scheduled. The elections were held according to the proportional system. Russkikh was included in the list of the Communist Party of the Russian Federation, and as in the regional group Moscow Oblast at number 5, after Vladimir Kashin, Nikolay Vasilyev, Sergey Sobko, and Valentin Kulikov. As a result of the elections, the Communist Party won 57 seats. The deputy mandate to Russkikh was given to him by the head of the Moscow regional branch of the Communist Party of the Russian Federation, as Vasilyev refused a seat in parliament. In the State Duma of the V convocation, he was a member of the Communist Party faction.

In November 2008, he was elected a member of the Central Committee of the Communist Party of the Russian Federation.

==== 6th convocation ====
In the fall of 2011, elections to the State Duma of the VI convocation were scheduled. The elections were held according to the proportional system, the deputies were elected for the first time for 5 years. Russkikh was included in the list of the Communist Party, and was in the regional group Moscow Oblast at number 2, after Vasilyev. As a result of the elections held on 4 December 2011, the Communist Party received 92 mandates. On 21 December 2011, Russkikh again received the mandate of the State Duma deputy. In the Duma, he led the committee on land relations and construction.

==== 7th convocation ====
The elections to the State Duma of the VII convocation were scheduled for 18 September 2016 and were held according to a mixed system. Russian ran simultaneously in the list of the Communist Party of the Russian Federation, where he was in the regional group No. 27 Moscow Oblast under No. 2, after Vasilyev, and in the electoral district No. 120 "Krasnogorsk" of the Moscow Oblast. As a result of the elections, the list of the Communist Party of the Russian Federation received 42 mandates, of which one was transferred to group number 27. Vasilyev again refused the mandate and it was transferred to Russkikh as a result. Krasnogorskiy (Moscow Oblast) took second place in the elections in the single-mandate constituency No. 120, losing to the representative of United Russia, Martin Shakkum.

In the State Duma of the VII convocation, he held the post of first deputy chairman of the committee for transport and construction.

=== Member of the Federation Council ===
On 18 September 2018, Andrey Vorobyov, who was elected governor of the Moscow Oblast for a second term, appointed Russkikh a member of the Federation Council - a Senator from the Moscow Oblast on executive authority. He replaced Yury Lipatov a member of United Russia, in this position. At the same time, Russkih passed the mandate of a State Duma member to Mikhail Avdeyev, a former member of the State Duma of the VI convocation.

In the Federation Council, he served as deputy chairman of the economic policy committee.

=== Acting Governor of Ulyanovsk Oblast ===
On 8 April 2021, Russian President Vladimir Putin appointed Russkikh as interim governor of the Ulyanovsk Oblast until the person elected as governor takes office. On 19 September 2021 he won the elections and on 4 October 2021 has officially become the governor of Ulyanovsk Oblast.

== Family ==
He is married to his spouse Olga, and they have a daughter and a son, and two grandchildren.
