= Sergey Morozov (politician) =

Russian politician

Sergey Morozov MP
- Сергей Морозов
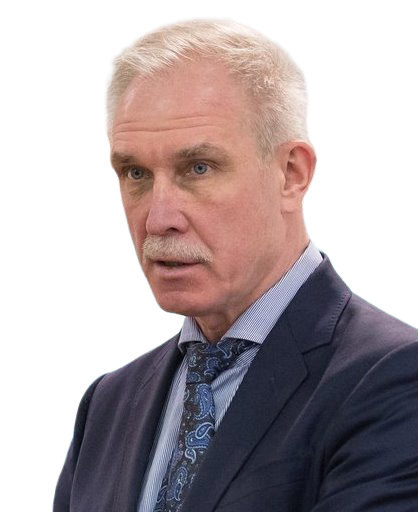
- Morozov in 2019

Member of the State Duma (Party List Seat)
- Incumbent
- Assumed office 12 October 2021

Assistant Plenipotentiary Representative in the Volga Federal District
- In office 19 April 2021 – 12 October 2021

3rd Governor of Ulyanovsk Oblast
- In office 6 January 2005 – 8 April 2021
- Preceded by: Maria Bolshakova (acting); Vladimir Shamanov
- Succeeded by: Aleksey Russkikh

Personal details
- Born: 6 September 1959 (age 66) Ulyanovsk, Russian SFSR, Soviet Union
- Party: United Russia
- Education: All-Union Legal Correspondence Institute

Sergey Ivanovich Morozov (Russian: Сергей Иванович Морозов; born 6 September 1959) is a Russian politician who is currently a member of parliament of the State Duma. He had served as the 3rd governor of Ulyanovsk Oblast in Russia from 6 January 2005 until 8 April 2021. He was elected in 2004; his term started in 2005.

After completing military service in the Soviet Pacific Fleet in 1980 he graduated from the All Union Juristic Institute in 1981. Between 1981 and 2000 he worked for the Ministry of the Interior in the Ulyanovsk Oblast later becoming head of the local Drug Enforcement Department. Morozov was elected mayor of Dimitrovgrad in 2000 and then governor of Ulyanovsk in 2004. He is married and has two sons and a daughter.

During Morozov’s tenure as governor, Ulyanovsk and the region saw the appearance of a monument to the letter “Ё,” the “philosophical sofa of Oblomov,” a monument to the ruble, and others. In 2005, Morozov established a regional holiday on September 12 called “Family Communication Day.” On this day, employers are recommended to let employees leave work early so that they can devote time to communicating with their families. Among the people, the holiday received the nickname “Conception Day” because children conceived on this date are born on Russia Day — June 12. This was connected with another initiative by Governor Morozov — “Give Birth to a Patriot on Russia Day.”

Morozov took a special interest in promoting the cultural events surrounding the 2016 Bandy World Championship, which took place in Ulyanovsk.

He is one of the members of the State Duma the United States Treasury sanctioned on 24 March 2022 in response to the 2022 Russian invasion of Ukraine.
