= Ulyanovsk State Agricultural Academy =

Agricultural university in Ulyanovsk, Russia

Coordinates: 54.3149°N 48.4052°E

Ulyanovsk State Agricultural University named after P. A. Stolypin
- Ульяновский государственный аграрный университет имени П. А. Столыпина
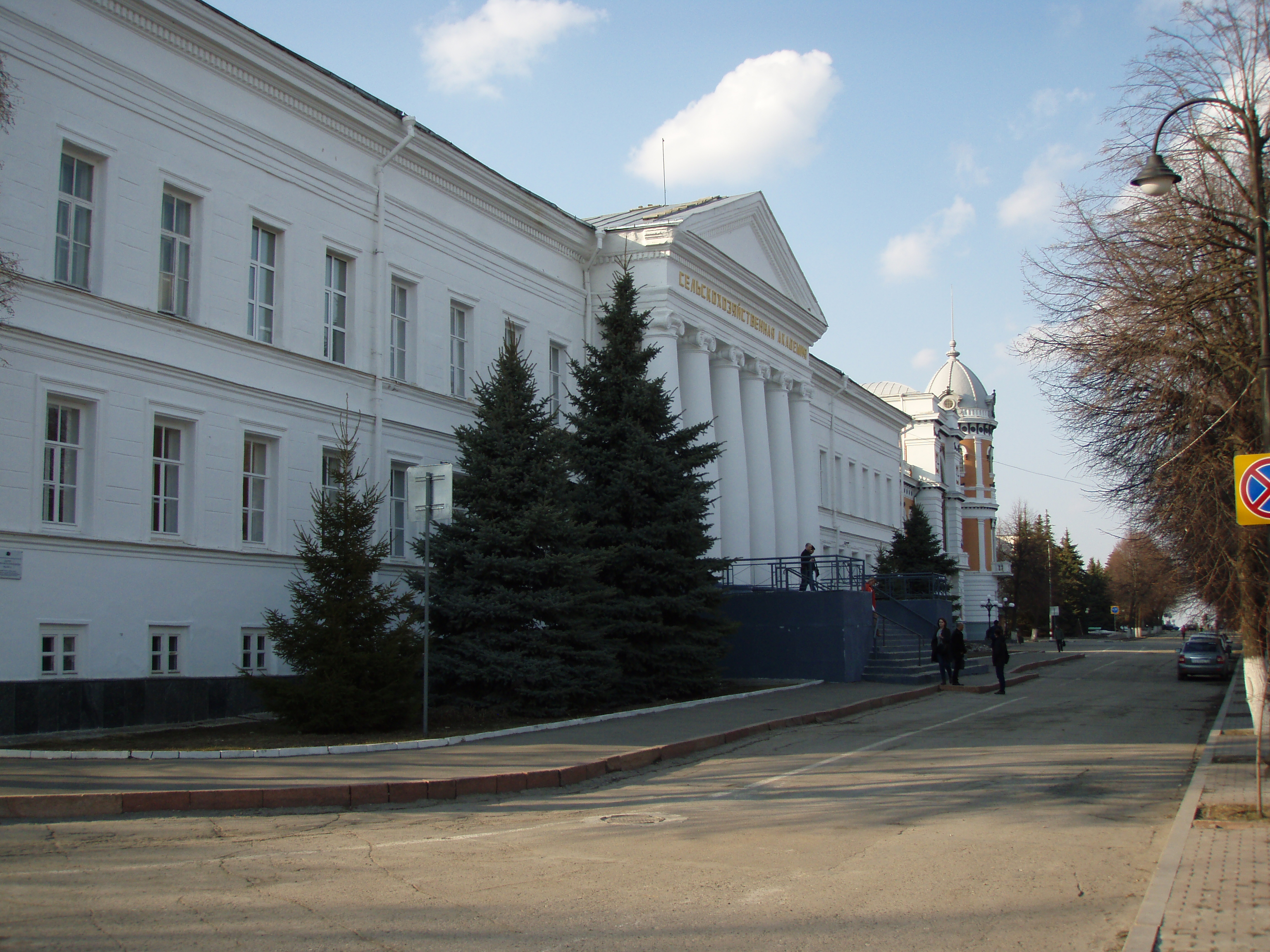
- Established: 1943
- Website: http://www.ulsau.ru

Ulyanovsk State Agricultural University named after P. A. Stolypin (Russian: Ульяновский государственный аграрный университет имени П. А. Столыпина) is a higher education and research institution in Ulyanovsk. It was established in 1943. The university is situated in a 1804 building by architect Andreyan Zakharov. The building is a cultural heritage monument of federal significance.

== Faculties ==
- agrotechnologies, land resources and food production;
- veterinary medicine and biotechnology;
- engineering;
- economic.

== Rectors ==
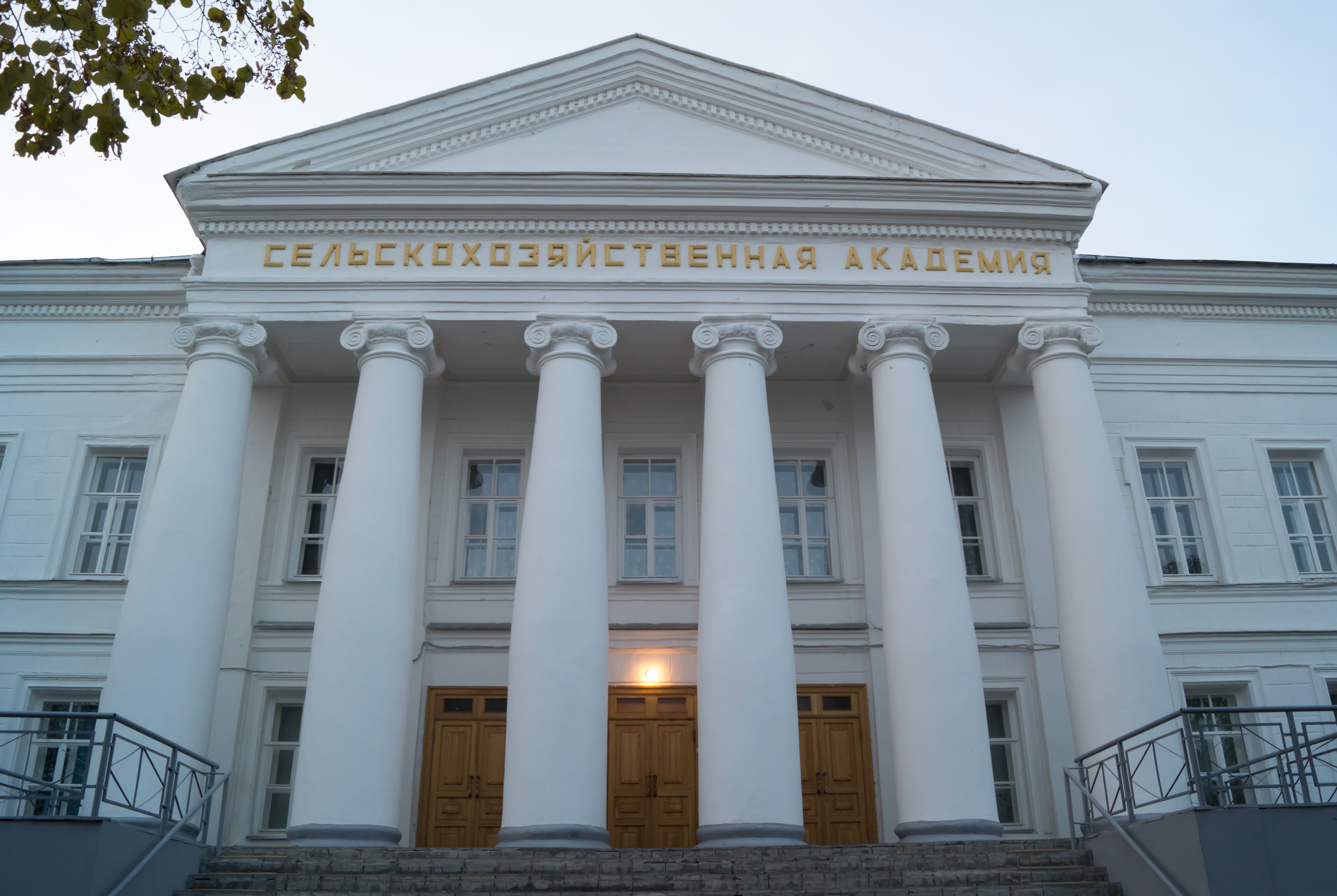
- Ulyanovsk State Agricultural University
  from February 7, 2020 – Isaychev Vitaly Alexandrovich
- 2004-2009 – Dozorov Alexander Vladimirovich
