= Ulyanovsk Oblast =

First-level administrative division of Russia

Ulyanovsk Oblast Ульяновская область (Russian)
- Oblast
- Flag Coat of arms

- Coordinates: 53°57′N 47°55′E
- Country: Russia
- Federal district: Volga
- Economic region: Volga
- Established: January 19, 1943
- Administrative center: Ulyanovsk

Government
  - Body: Legislative Assembly
  - Governor: Aleksei Russkikh

Area
  - Total: 37,181 km^{2} (14,356 sq mi)
  - Rank: 62nd

Population (2021 census)
  - Total: 1,196,745
  - Estimate (2018): 1,246,618
  - Rank: 38th
  - Density: 32.187/km^{2} (83.364/sq mi)
  - Urban: 76.7%
  - Rural: 23.3%

GDP (nominal, 2024)
  - Total: ₽782 billion (US$9.18 billion)
  - Per capita: ₽669,092 (US$7,851.26)
- Time zone: UTC+4 (UTC+04:00)
- ISO 3166 code: RU-ULY
- License plates: 73, 173
- OKTMO ID: 73000000
- Official languages: Russian
- Website: https://ulgov.ru/

Ulyanovsk Oblast (Note: Russian: Ульяновская область, romanized: Ulyanovskaya oblastʹ) is a federal subject of Russia (an oblast). It is located in the Volga Federal District. Its administrative center is the city of Ulyanovsk. It has a population of 1,292,799 (2010 Census).

The area of Ulyanovsk Oblast corresponds to the former Simbirsk Governorate which formerly existed as an administrative-territorial unit (guberniya) of the Russian Empire, replacing the Simbirsk Viceroyalty from 1796 and later, Bolshevik Russia. The governorate was renamed to Ulyanovsk Governorate, in honor of Vladimir Lenin (born Ulyanov) who was born in Simbirsk, after his death in 1924. In 1928, Ulyanovsk became an okrug and the present day Ulyanovsk Oblast was formed in 1943 merging some parts of Kuybyshev and Penza Oblasts.

== Geography ==
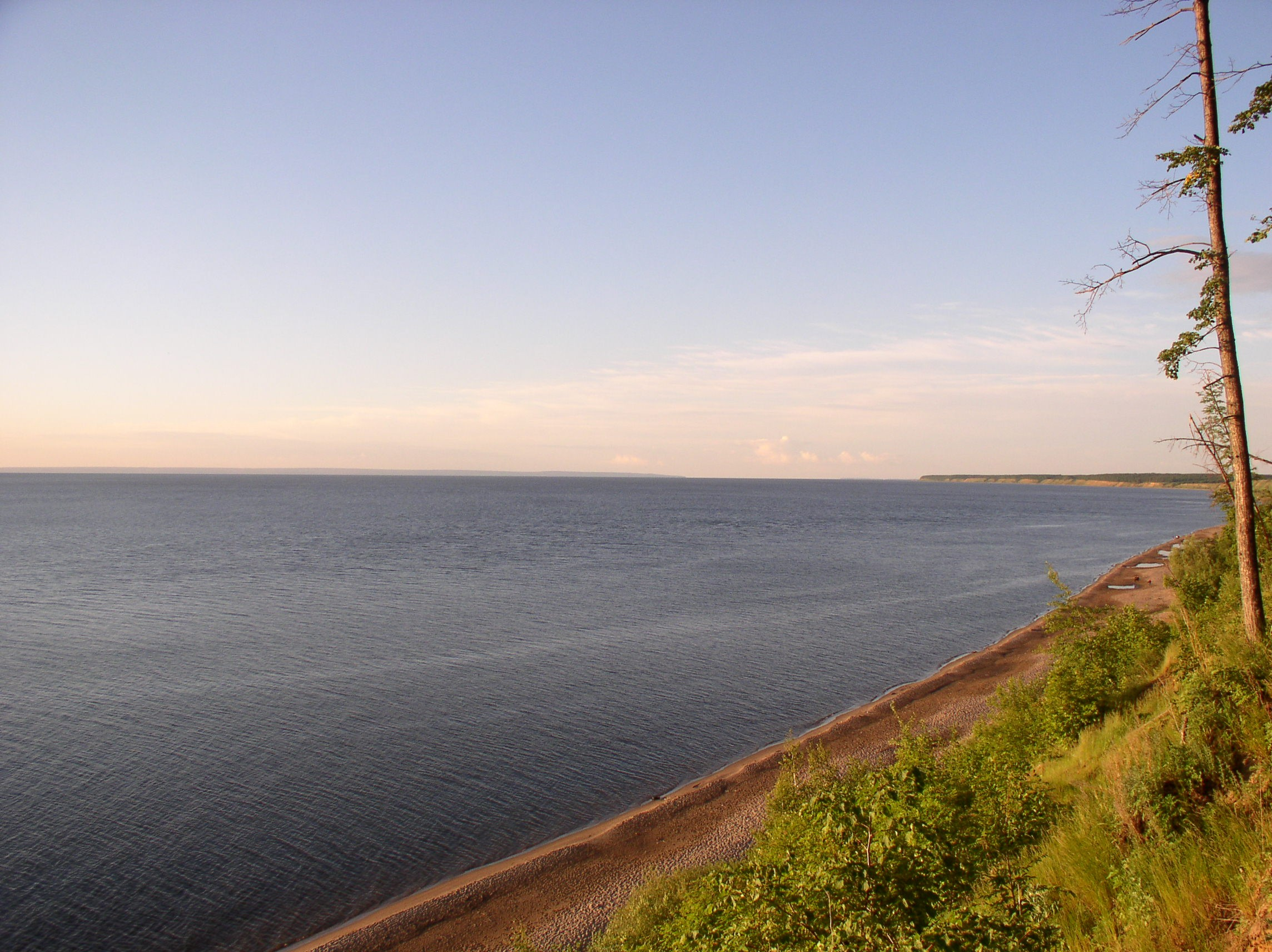
Volga River (Kuybyshev Reservoir) near Ulyanovsk

Ulyanovsk Oblast borders with Chuvashia (N), Tatarstan (NE), Samara Oblast (E), Saratov Oblast (S), Penza Oblast (W), and Mordovia (NW).

It is located on the northern edge of Central Steppes. A quarter of its territory is covered with deciduous forests; the rest is covered with steppes and meadows. The oblast is divided in half by the Volga River. Hilly areas to the west of the Volga are known as Volga Upland (elevations up to 358 m (1,175 ft) ). Eastern part of the oblast is mostly flat. The water table occupies about 6% of territory.

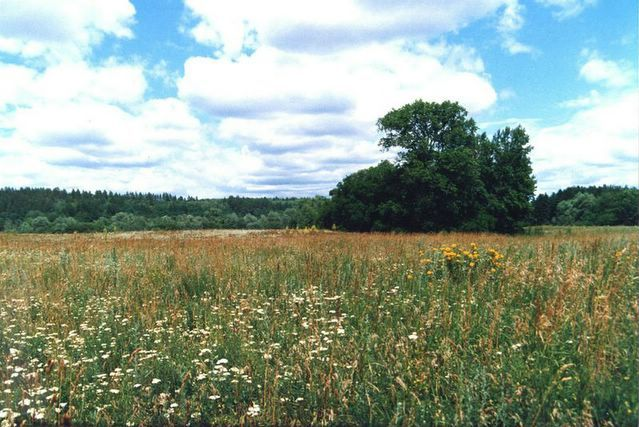
Nature reserve "Privolzhskaya lesostep"

Ulyanovsk Oblast is categorized as a dfb, (warm-summer humid continental), on the köppen classification scale. The mean temperature is 5 °C (41 °F) where the average temperature can range from -13.33 °C (8 °F) to 25.6 °C (78 °F). The hottest month by average is July with an average of 19.5 °C (67 °F) and the coldest month by average is January with an average of -10.6 °C (13 °F). Annual precipitation average is 23.13 inches with the wettest month by average being March with an average of 3.43 inches. The average wind speed is 16 MPH with the windiest month being April with an average of 18 MPH. The average humidity is 71% and the average dew point is 32 °F. The average pressure is 30.03 HG. The average visibility is 17 miles.

=== Nature ===
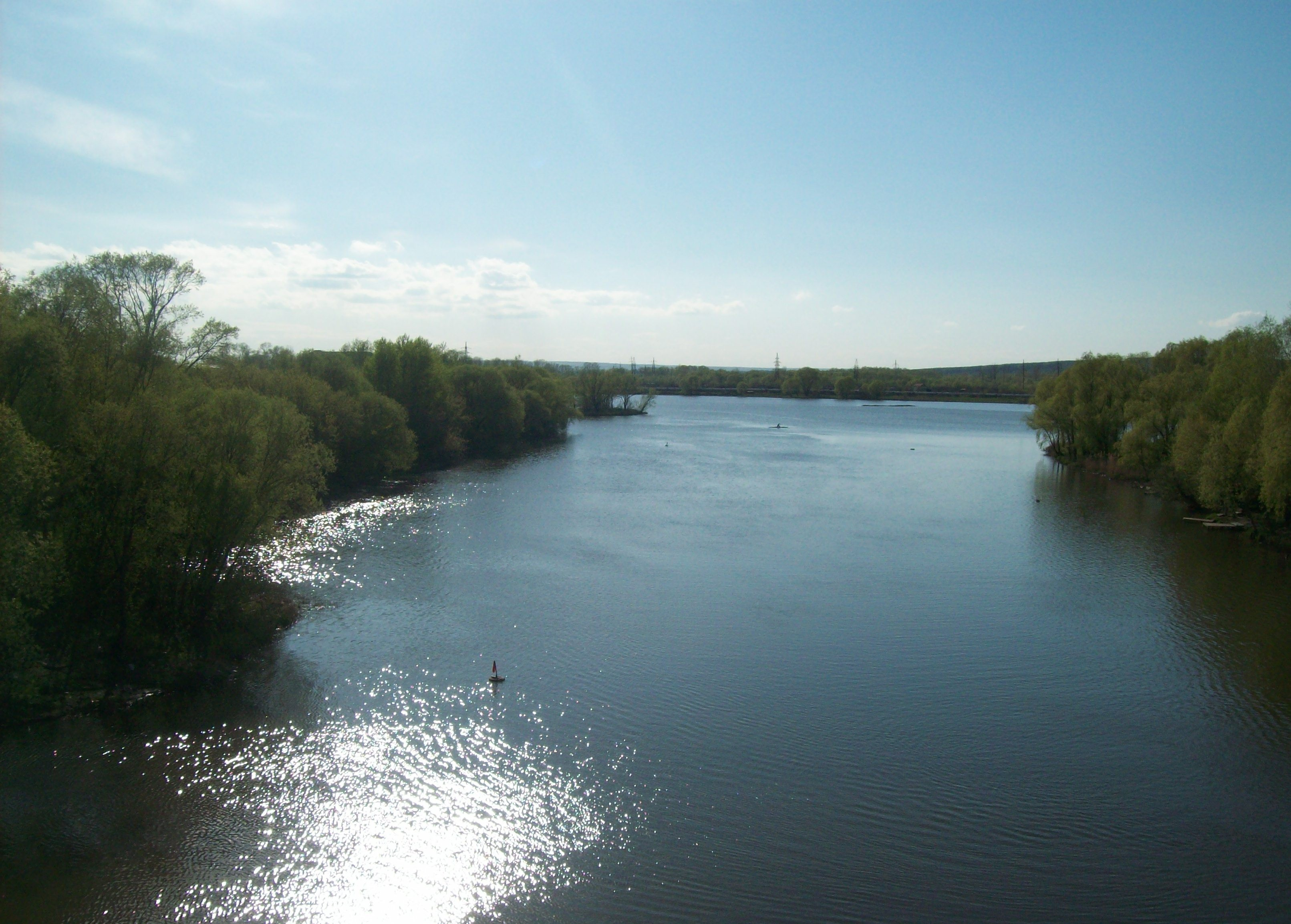
Sviyaga River

Ulyanovsk Oblast is located in the zones of wooded plain and broad-leaved scaffolding.

Soils are predominantly chernozem.

Forests occupy 1/4 of its territories. In the northwest — large massifs of oak forest with the participation of linden, maple; in the Transvolga region — meadow steppes, separate pine borons.

The area is inhabited by moose, marten, squirrel, hare (white and other) as well as numerous planktonic and marshy- coastal birds. Kuybyshev Reservoir is home to fish such as bream, pike-perch, carp and others. Ulyanovsk Oblast also has a concentrated wasp population.

These protected areas are found on the territory of the region: the national park Sengiley Mountains, the guarding zone of the state preserved “Volga wooded plain”, the monuments of nature Undory mineral source, relict forests etc.

== History ==
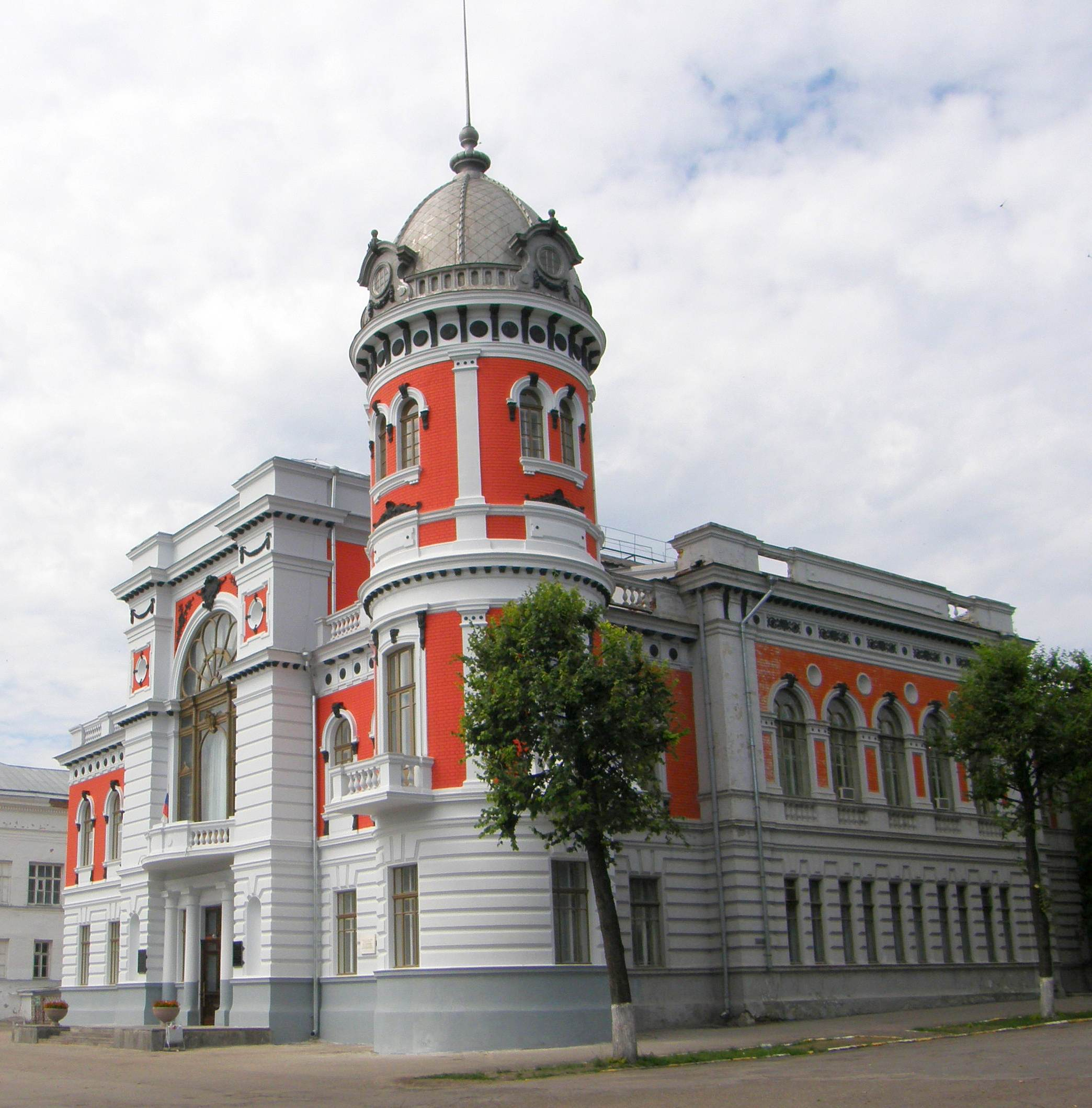
Regional Museum of History and Arts

The first settlements of Middle Volga people were established in this area of Volga more than 100,000 years ago, according to archaeological science. The presence of human groups in the Ulyanovsk Volga region in the Paleolithic show separate parking and location of stone tools and bones found in the estuary. Cheremshan Tunguz on the peninsula, on the shores of the Volga in the region of Undory resort.

In the 8th and 9th centuries Ulyanovsk Volga region became a part of the early Volga Bulgaria, as a union of nomadic Turkic and sedentary Finno-Ugric tribes.

In the late 14th and early 15th century, the devastating Central Asian ruler Tamerlane desolated Volga Ulyanovsk. in the late 1430s the region was made a part of the Kazan Khanate. After the pacification of the territory of the future of his governorship Simbirsk gradually settled by Russians, who mingled with the local Tatars.

In the late 1640s, under the leadership of Bogdan Hitrovo, construction of the Karsunsky-Simbirsk defense line began (1647-1654 biennium).

Twenty-two years after its founding, the city of Simbirsk had to withstand a siege of the Cossacks, led by Ataman Stepan Razin.

In the 18th century in connection with the expansion of the territory of the Russian state, in particular, to the east, and began to develop intensively populated southern regions of the present territory of the Ulyanovsk region. Simbirsk began to lose its status of strategic military importance, but remained the provincial center.

=== Russian revolution ===
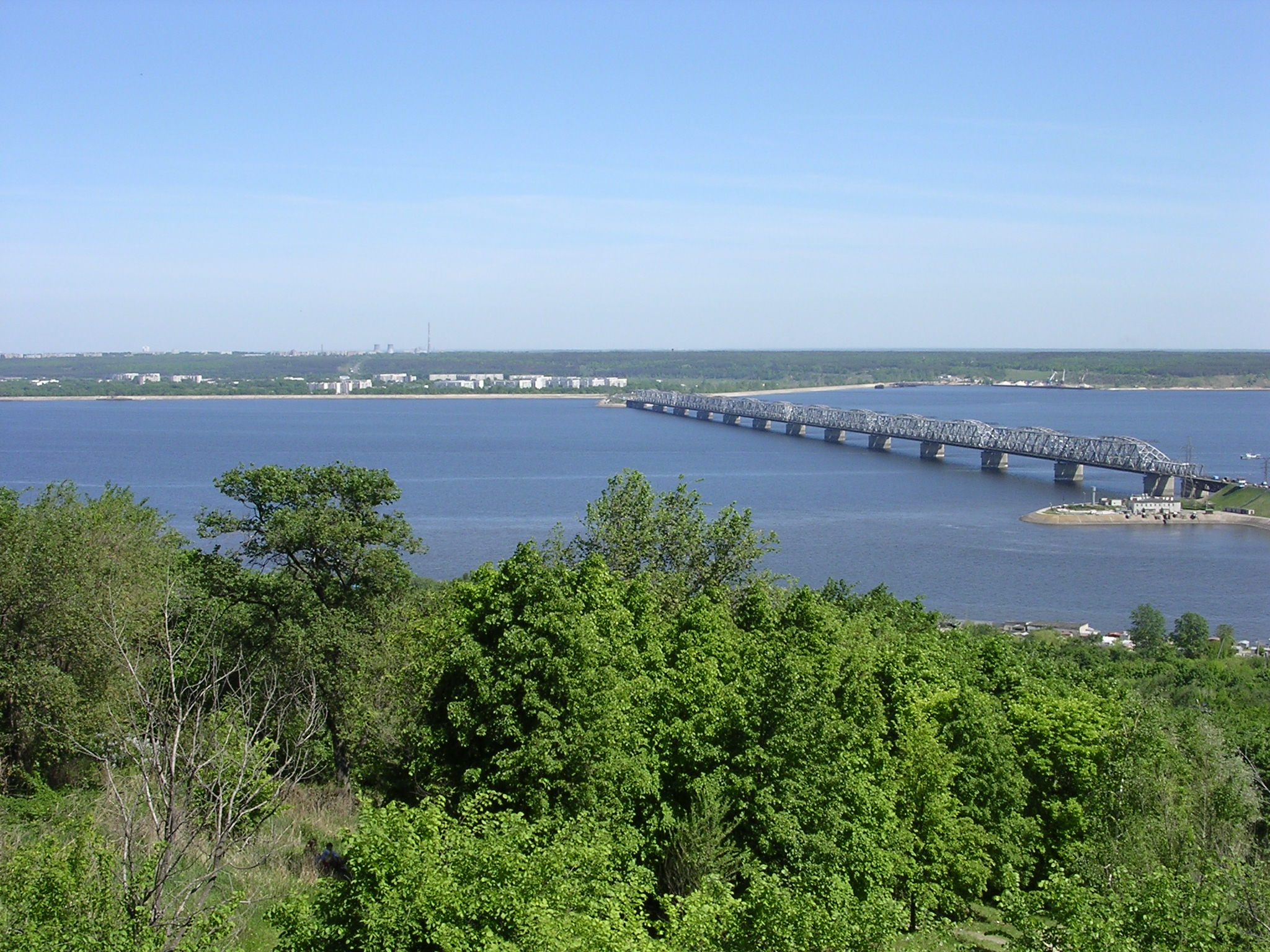
The Imperial Bridge across the Volga River in Ulyanovsk

The Bolsheviks took power in Simbirsk one and a half month after the October Revolution—December 10, 1917. In 1918, the province was at the heart of the Russian Civil War. In July 1918 Simbirsk was captured by troops of the Komuch army led by White Russian tsarist General Vladimir Kappel. But on September 12 the Bolsheviks recaptured the city, resulting in the restoration of communism. The Red Army victory was led by the "Iron Division". Simbirsk was the headquarters of the Revolutionary Military Council of the eastern front. The ammunition factory in Simbirsk was essential to ensuring the Red Army victory.

In 1924, Simbirsk was renamed Ulyanovsk. On May 14, 1928, the Ulyanovsk Governorate of the RSFSR was abolished. The Province, together with Penza, Samara and Orenburg became part of the newly formed Middle Volga region.

=== World War II ===
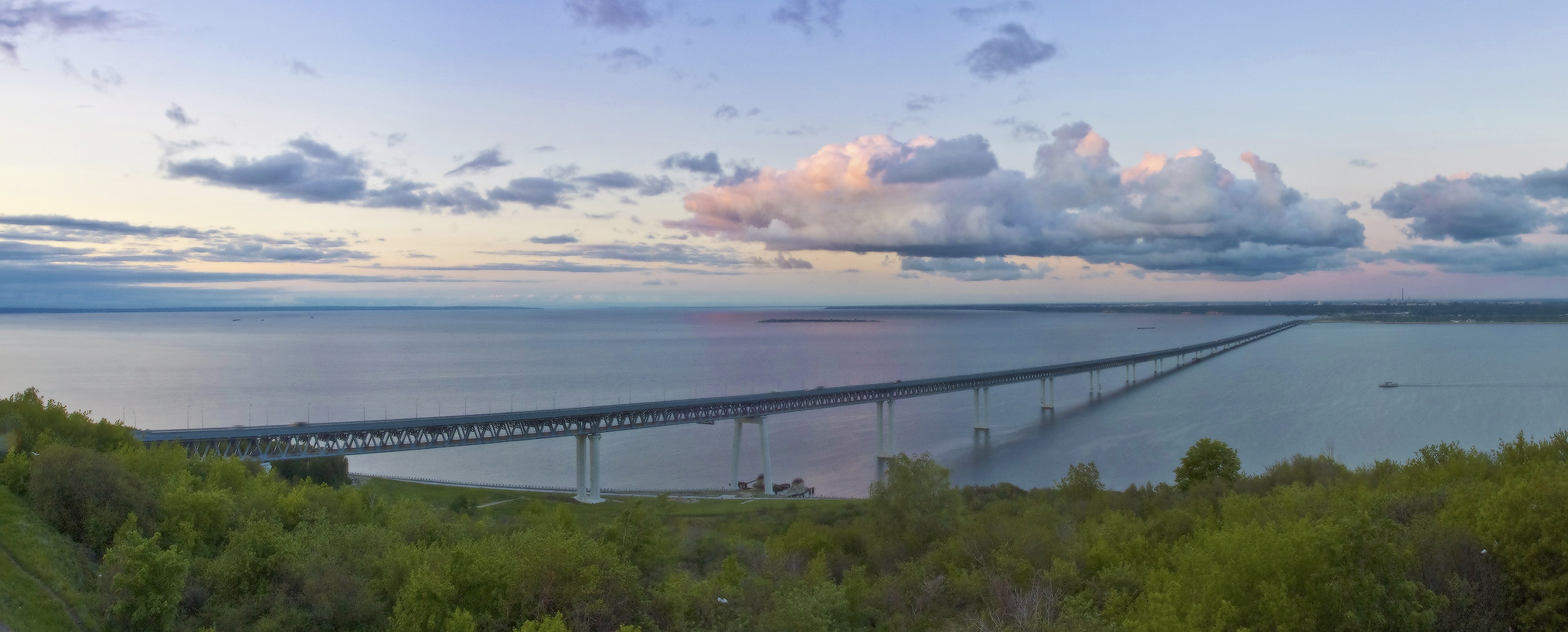
Presidential bridge through Volga River in Ulyanovsk

Since the beginning of the Great Patriotic War in Ulyanovsk, being the rear, the evacuated enterprises, institutions and people from the western regions of the country, from Moscow and Leningrad. January 19, 1943 from several districts of Kuybyshev and Penza Oblasts formed Ulyanovsk Oblast.

=== Post-war development ===
In the 1950 and 1960s, new enterprises were created in the region (factory of heavy and unique machines, mechanical plant, Dimitrovgrad Research Institute of Atomic Reactors, etc.), and infrastructure was built, including aroad bridge over the Volga River and Ulyanovsk Airport. In 1970, the then General Secretary of the Communist Party of the Soviet Union Leonid Brezhnev, inaugurated memorial museum of Lenin.

After the dissolution of the Soviet Union in 1991, Ulyanovsk Oblast became part of the newly-formed Russian Federation. On 30 October 1997, Ulyanovsk, alongside Astrakhan, Kirov, Murmansk, and Yaroslavl signed a power-sharing agreement with the government of Russia, granting it autonomy. The agreement was abolished on 31 December 2001.

== Politics ==
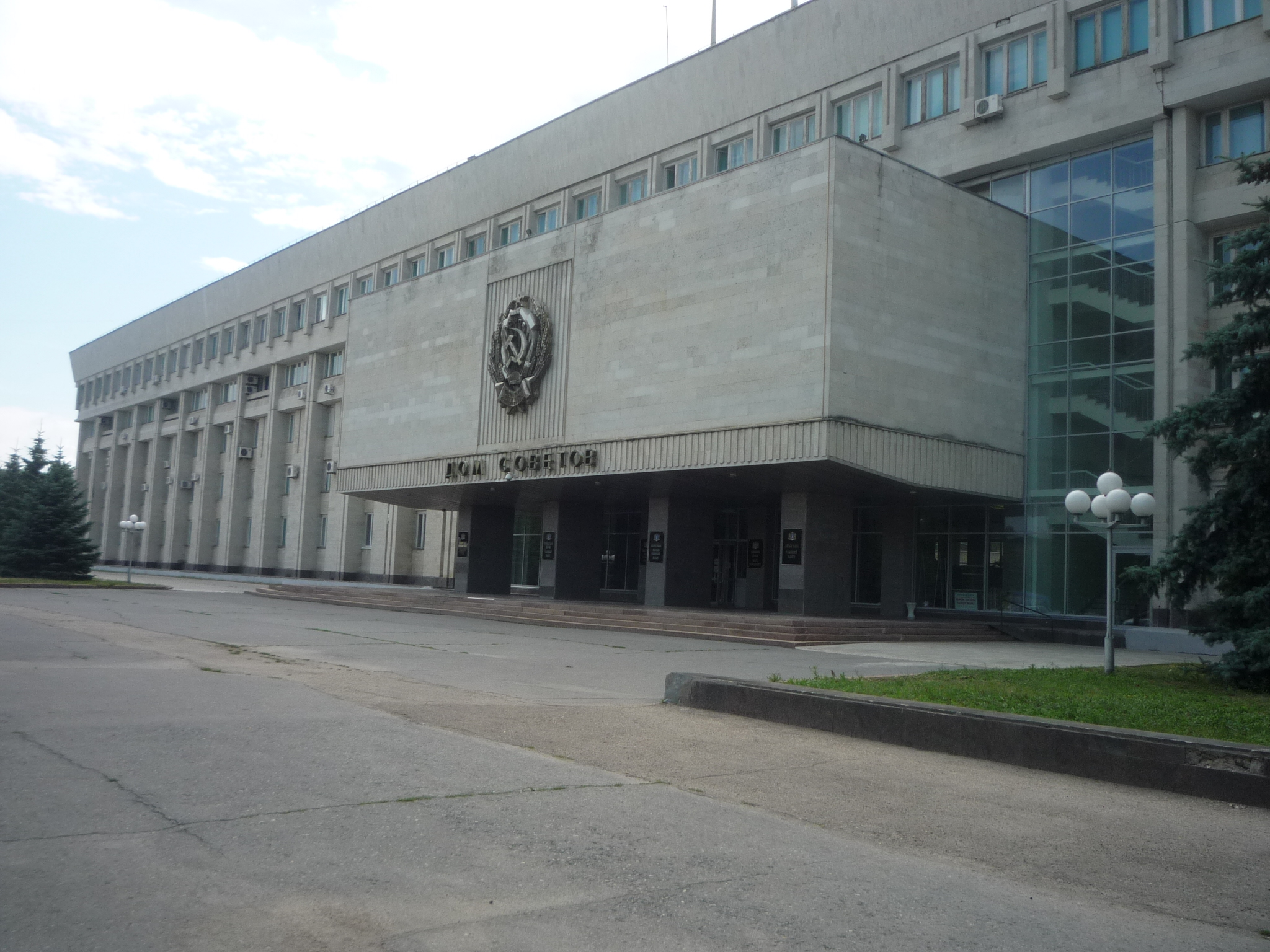
Seat of the Legislative Assembly

During the Soviet period, the high authority in the oblast was shared between three persons: The first secretary of the Ulyanovsk CPSU Committee (who in reality had the biggest authority), the chairman of the oblast Soviet (legislative power), and the chairman of the oblast Executive Committee (executive power). Since 1991, CPSU lost all the power, and the head of the Oblast administration, and eventually the governor was appointed/elected alongside elected regional parliament.

The Charter of Ulyanovsk Oblast is the fundamental law of the region. The Legislative Assembly of Ulyanovsk Oblast is the province's standing legislative (representative) body. The Legislative Assembly exercises its authority by passing laws, resolutions, and other legal acts and by supervising the implementation and observance of the laws and other legal acts passed by it. The highest executive body is the Oblast Administration, which includes territorial executive bodies such as district administrations, committees, and commissions that facilitate development and run the day to day matters of the province. The Oblast administration supports the activities of the Governor who is the highest official and acts as guarantor of the observance of the oblast Charter in accordance with the Constitution of Russia.

=== Legislative ===
Since 1995, the legislature in the region has been represented by a unicameral parliament - the Legislative Assembly of Ulyanovsk Oblast. The leader is the chairman of the Legislative Assembly. The Legislative Assembly is elected by popular vote every five years. The first two convocations were elected by the majority system - from 25 districts, one deputy each. The current fifth, fourth and third convocations were elected by the majority-list system. One half (18) of the deputies are from party lists and the other half are from 18 constituencies.

Chairmen of the Legislative Assembly: Sergey Ryabukhin (1/1996 - 6/2001), Boris Zotov (7/2001 - 2013), Anatoly Bakayev (14/09/2013 - 2018), Valery Malyshev (19/09/2018–present).

In the 2003 elections to the Legislative Assembly of the third convocation, 3 parties and 1 bloc passed (overcame the 5% barrier):

- United Russia — 27.42%
- People for Frolych — 12.75%
- Communist Party of the Russian Federation — 11.25%
- Liberal Democratic Party of Russia — 11.1%
- Independent — 12.75%

In the 2008 elections to the Legislative Assembly, 4 parties passed (overcame the 7% threshold):

- United Russia — 66.36%
- CPRF — 15.95%
- A Just Russia — 7.77%
- LDPR — 7.39

14 representatives of United Russia and 1 representative of A Just Russia passed through single-mandate constituencies.

In the 2013 elections to the Legislative Assembly, 3 parties passed:

- United Russia
- CPRF
- LDPR

Total deputies in parliament:

- United Russia — 31
- CPRF — 4
- LDPR — 1

=== Federal elections in the region ===
Until 2000, the Communist Party of the Russian Federation invariably won the federal elections in the Ulyanovsk region: for example, in 1995 and 1999, the Communists won the parliamentary elections with a result of more than 40%; in 1996, Gennady Zyuganov won both rounds of the presidential elections. The turning point occurred in 2000: Vladimir Putin won the March presidential elections in the region. The 2003, 2007 and 2011 State Duma elections were won by the United Russia party, and Dmitry Medvedev won the 2008 presidential election. On 4 March 2012, Vladimir Putin won again, gaining 58.18% of the votes of the Oblast's voters.

== Demographics ==
Historical population
Year	Pop.	±%
1897	1,527,848	—
1926	1,384,220	−9.4%
1959	1,117,359	−19.3%
1970	1,224,748	+9.6%
1979	1,270,036	+3.7%
1989	1,400,806	+10.3%
2002	1,382,811	−1.3%
2010	1,292,799	−6.5%
2021	1,196,745	−7.4%
Source: Census data

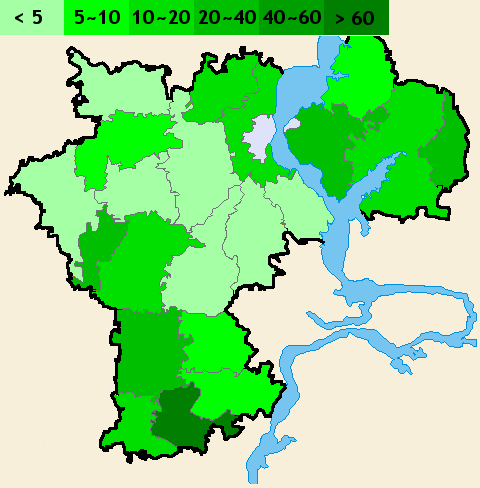
Tatars

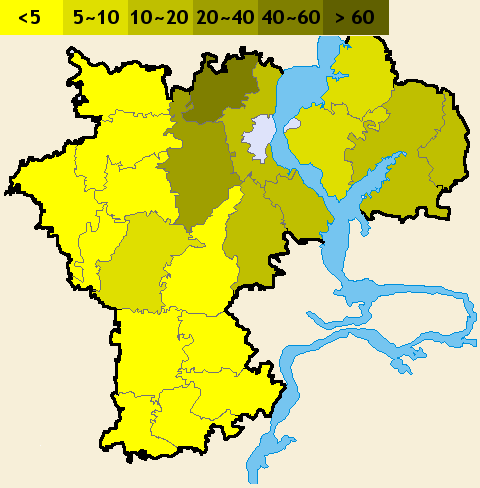
Chuvash

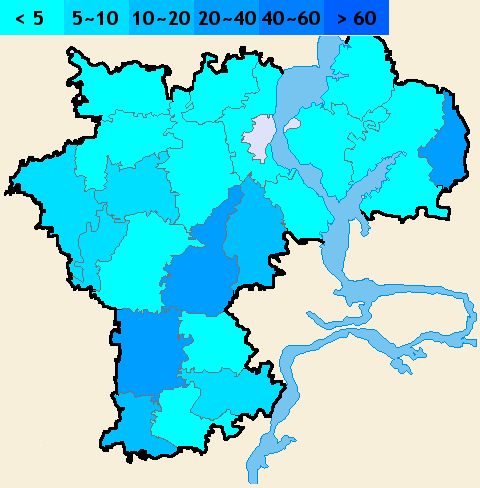
Erzya

Population: 1,196,745 (2021 census); 1,292,799 (2010 census); 1,382,811 (2002 census); 1,400,806 (1989 Soviet census).

55% of residents of Ulyanovsk Oblast live in two cities with population above 25,000—Ulyanovsk and Dimitrovgrad.

The ethnic composition is as follows:

- 73.6% Russian
- 12.2% Tatar
- 7.7% Chuvash
- 3.2% Mordva
- 3.3% others
- 67,890 people were registered from administrative databases, and could not declare an ethnicity. It is estimated that the proportion of ethnicities in this group is the same as that of the declared group.

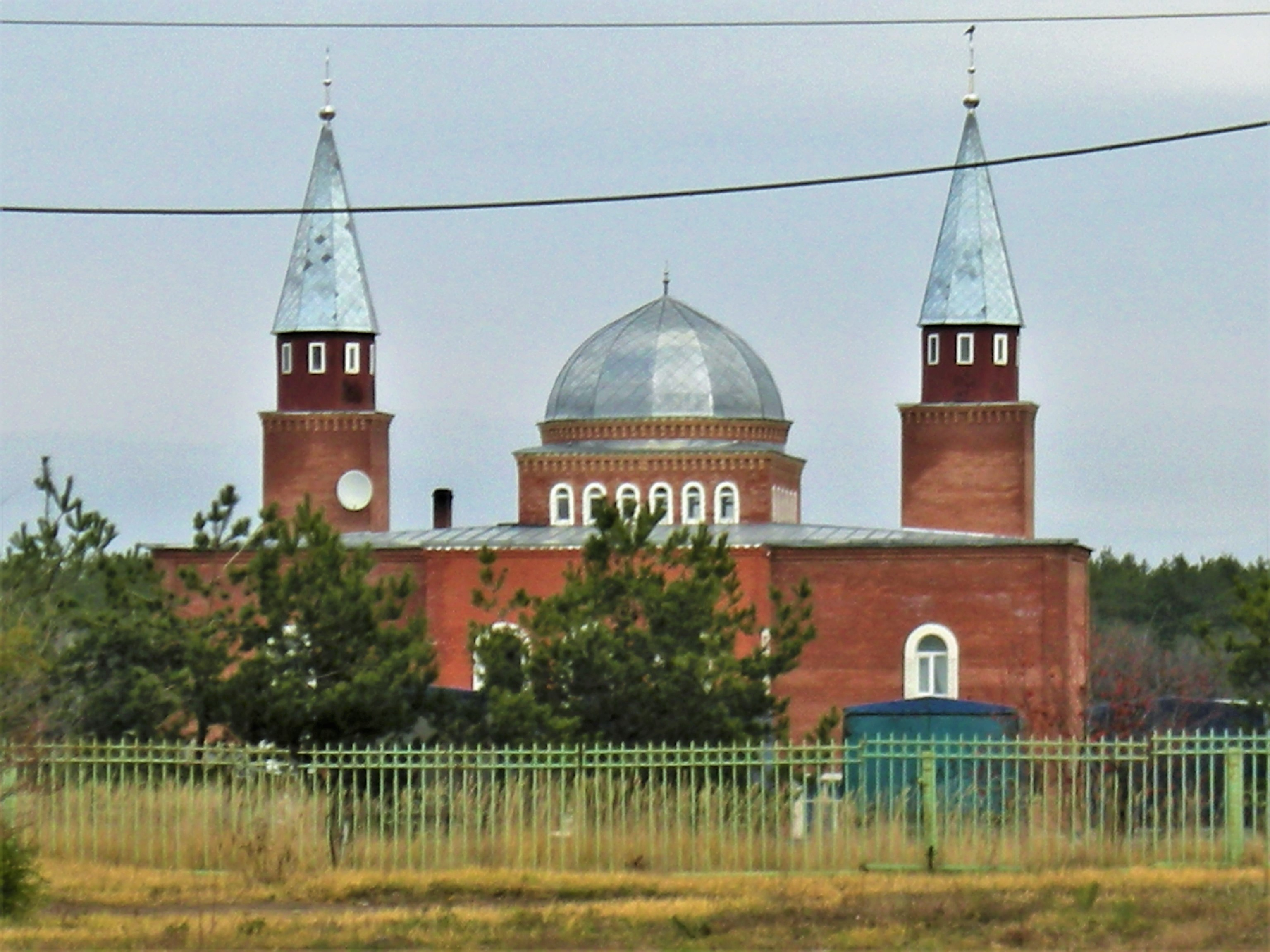
Mosque in Ulyanovsk

Vital statistics for 2024:

- Births: 8,216 (7.0 per 1,000)
- Deaths: 17,685 (15.1 per 1,000)

Total fertility rate (2024):
1.27 children per woman

Life expectancy (2021):
Total — 69.05 years (male — 64.21, female — 73.90)

=== Religion ===
Religion in Ulyanovsk Oblast as of 2012 (Sreda Arena Atlas)
Russian Orthodoxy	60.6%
Other Orthodox	0.9%
Old Believers	0.7%
Other Christians	1.5%
Islam	6.9%
Rodnovery and other native faiths	0.9%
Spiritual but not religious	12.2%
Atheism and irreligion	8.4%
Other and undeclared	7.9%

=== Education ===
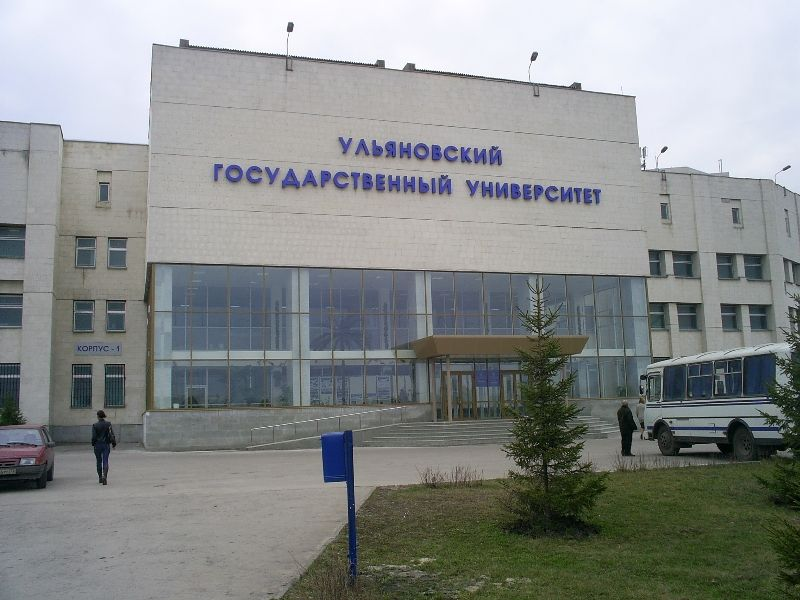
Ulyanovsk State University, Sviyaga Campus

- Ulyanovsk State University, established in 1988 as a branch of Moscow State University. At the present time, UlSU is one of the largest higher educational institutions in the Volga region, comprising 6 institutes, 6 independent faculties, 2 affiliates, 5 junior colleges, 6 learning centers. UlSU enrolls about 15 thousand students annually, among them 125 foreign citizens from 20 countries of the world.
- Ulyanovsk State Technical University, established in 1957 as Ulyanovsk Polytech University. Today Ulyanovsk State Technical University features over 14,000 students on different education programs at 10 faculties and 48 departments.
- Ulyanovsk State Pedagogical University, established in 1932.
- Ulyanovsk State Agricultural Academy, established in 1943.
- Ulyanovsk Higher Civil Aviation School, founded in 1935 as a training center, designed for training and retraining of flight crews of civil aircraft. In 1992, raised its status to the present. Has branches in Krasny Kut, Saratov Oblast and Sasovo, Ryazan Oblast. When it has Main industry museum of civil aviation history (Ulyanovsk aircraft museum), established in 1983.

There is also a number of technical and medical colleges in Ulyanovsk.

== Economy ==
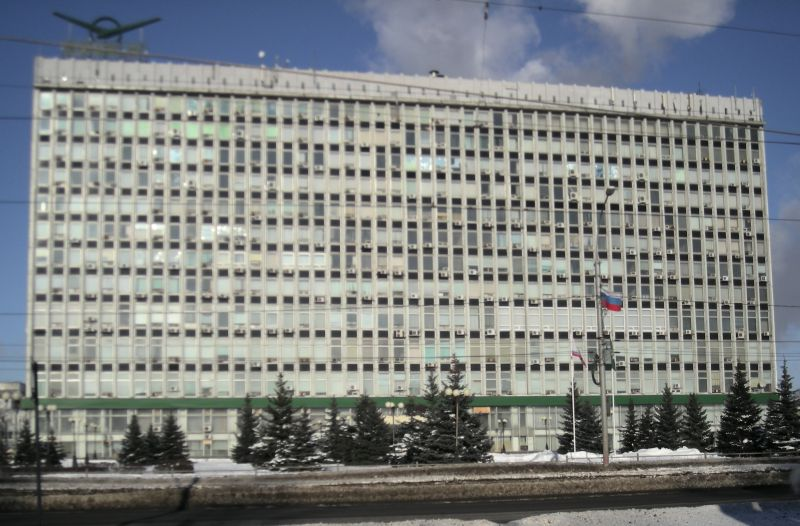
The headquarters of UAZ, now Sollers JSC Corporation

Ulyanovsk Oblast is part of the Volga economic region.

Ulyanovsk Oblast has an abundance of land, water, forest, and mineral resources. Ulyanovsk Region also has substantial reserves of other raw materials used in industry, such as various kinds of sand, cement materials, clays, and peat. One of the largest quartz sand deposits in the CIS, the Tashlinskoe deposit, is located in the region.

Ulyanovsk and Dimitrovgrad are industrial cities and contain a number of large plants and factories. Rural part of Ulyanovsk Oblast is agricultural and is focused primarily on animal husbandry, to the lesser extent on crop farming. There are two resorts in Ulyanovsk Oblast territory - "Bely Yar" and "Dubki".

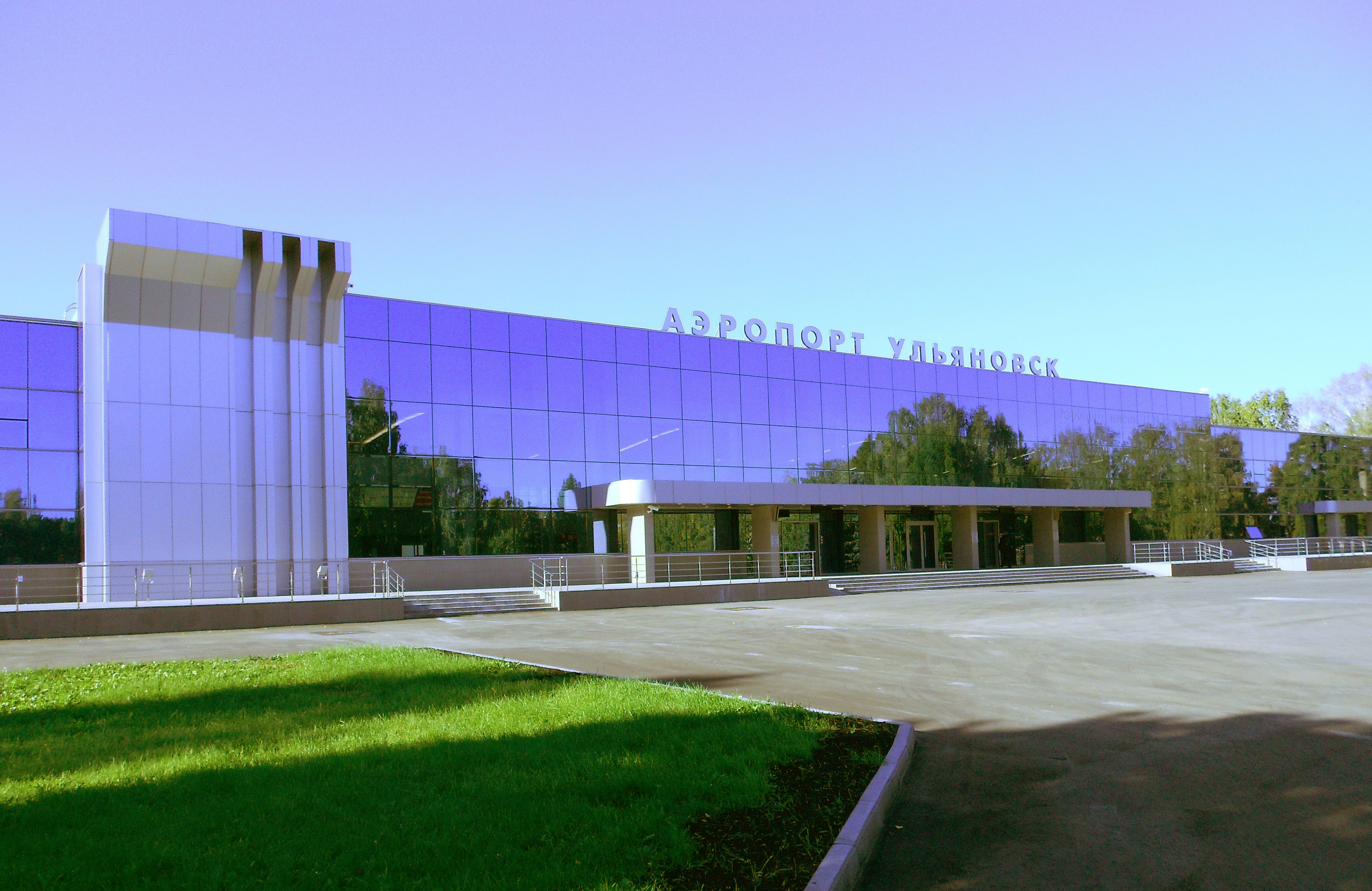
Ulyanovsk Central Airport, major airport, primarily for domestic flights

Ulyanovsk is a major industrial hub for aircraft and auto industries.

The UAZ automobile manufacturing plant, now a subsidiary of Sollers JSC; Aviastar-SP Aircraft Company, now a part of United Aircraft Corporation; Scientific and Production Association "Mars" (manufactures industrial control systems for the Russian Navy), now part of state-owned conglomerate Agat; Ulyanovsk Cartridge Works (manufactures ammunition for firearms); Ulyanovsk Motor Plant (russian.Ульяновский моторный завод, UMZ) and Ulyanovsk Mechanical Plant (russian.Ульяновский механический завод, UMZ, subsidiary of JSC Almaz-Antey) are based in the city along with a variety of light industry and food-processing enterprises. Other developed sectors include the flour-milling, meat, butter-making, starch and molasses, distilling, building material, and woodworking industries.

In addition, a global, international airline for unique and heavy cargo, Volga-Dnepr Airlines is based in the city too.

There are many manufacturing facilities of foreign corporations such as Legrand (company), Mars, Incorporated, Takata-Petri, Anadolu Efes S.K., ALFA (Mexico) and others.

Banking is mostly represented by national banks such as Sberbank, VTB Bank, Alfa-Bank, Bin Bank, Ak Bars Bank, MDM Bank, Trust Bank and also regional banks from Ulyanovsk Oblast.

Ulyanovsk has also a strong military base presence in town. The 31st Airborne Brigade of the Russian Airborne Troops of the armed forces is based in Ulyanovsk.

=== Tourism and Hospitality Industry ===
Bank of Russia in Ulyanovsk

Tourism is a growing industry in this region because of Volga micro-climate and historical significance of Simbirsk. Hilton Hotel Group and Marriott Hotels & Resorts are building their hotels in the downtown area.

The region of Undory, a driving distance from Ulyanovsk is famous for its spas and mineral water. The city offers many options for sports enthusiasts. The countryside is ideal for outdoor and water sports. The springs of Undory have been known for more than 200 years. The water at spa is rich in sodium chloride, and comes from artesian wells.

== Sports ==
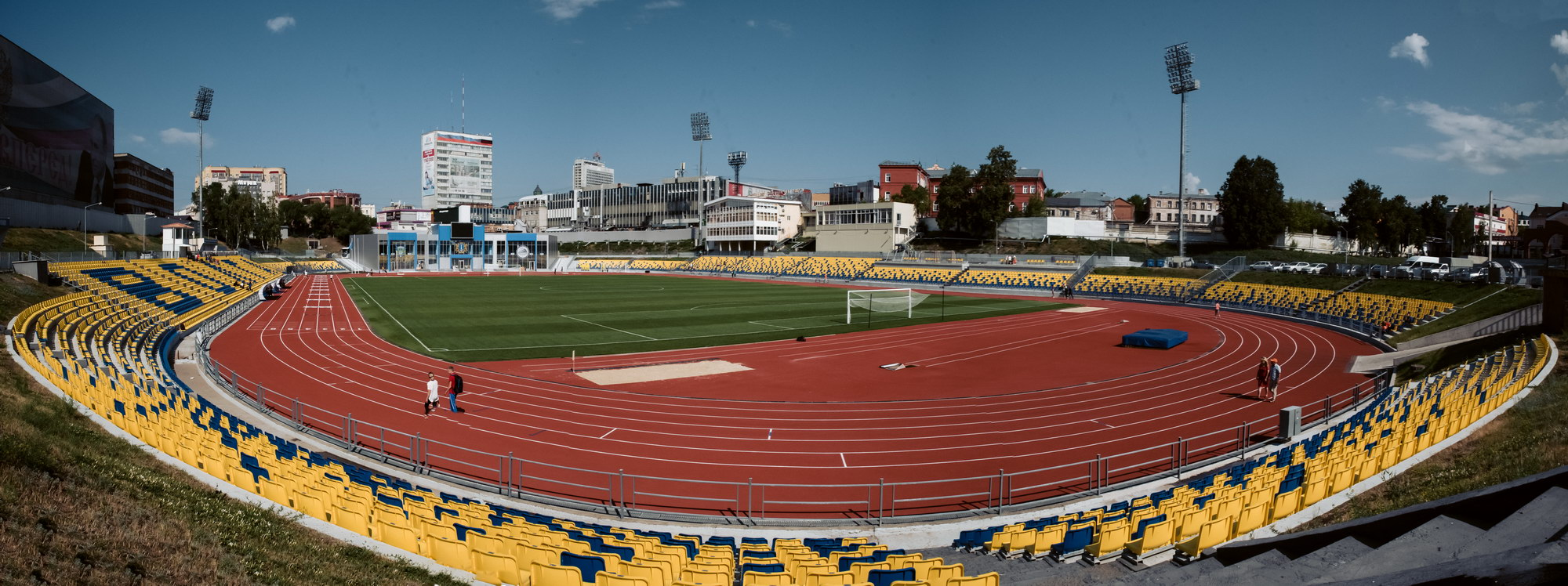
Trud Stadium.

Bandy is traditionally the most popular sport in Ulyanovsk Oblast.Volga plays in the Russian Bandy Super League. The other club Simbirsk plays in the 2nd division. An indoor arena for bandy, Volga-Sport-Arena, has been built, as one of the first in Russia. It has a capacity of 5 000. The outdoor stadium will be modernised and have a capacity of 18 000. The 2016 Bandy World Championship is being played in Ulyanovsk. and Dimitrovgrad.

In association football, FC Volga plays in "Urals-Volga" zone of the Russian Second Division.

Ulyanovsk also hosted matches of first qualifying round UEFA Women's Under-17 Championship 2014. Matches were held at "Trud" Football Stadium in the downtown Ulyanovsk.

Overall sports get a lot of support from the Ulyanovsk Oblast government.

== Sister relationships ==
- Nghệ An Province, Vietnam

== See also ==
- List of Chairmen of the Ulyanovsk Oblast Duma
