= Legislative Assembly of Ulyanovsk Oblast =

Regional parliament of Ulyanovsk Oblast, Russia

Legislative Assembly of Ulyanovsk Oblast Законодательное собрание Ульяновской области
- 7th legislature

Type
- Type: Unicameral

Leadership
- Chairman: Valery Malyshev, United Russia since 19 September 2018

Structure
- Seats: 36
- Political groups: United Russia (27) CPRF (3); LDPR (3); SRZP (1); CPCR (1) Independent (1)

Elections
- Last election: 8-10 September 2023
- Next election: 2028

Meeting place
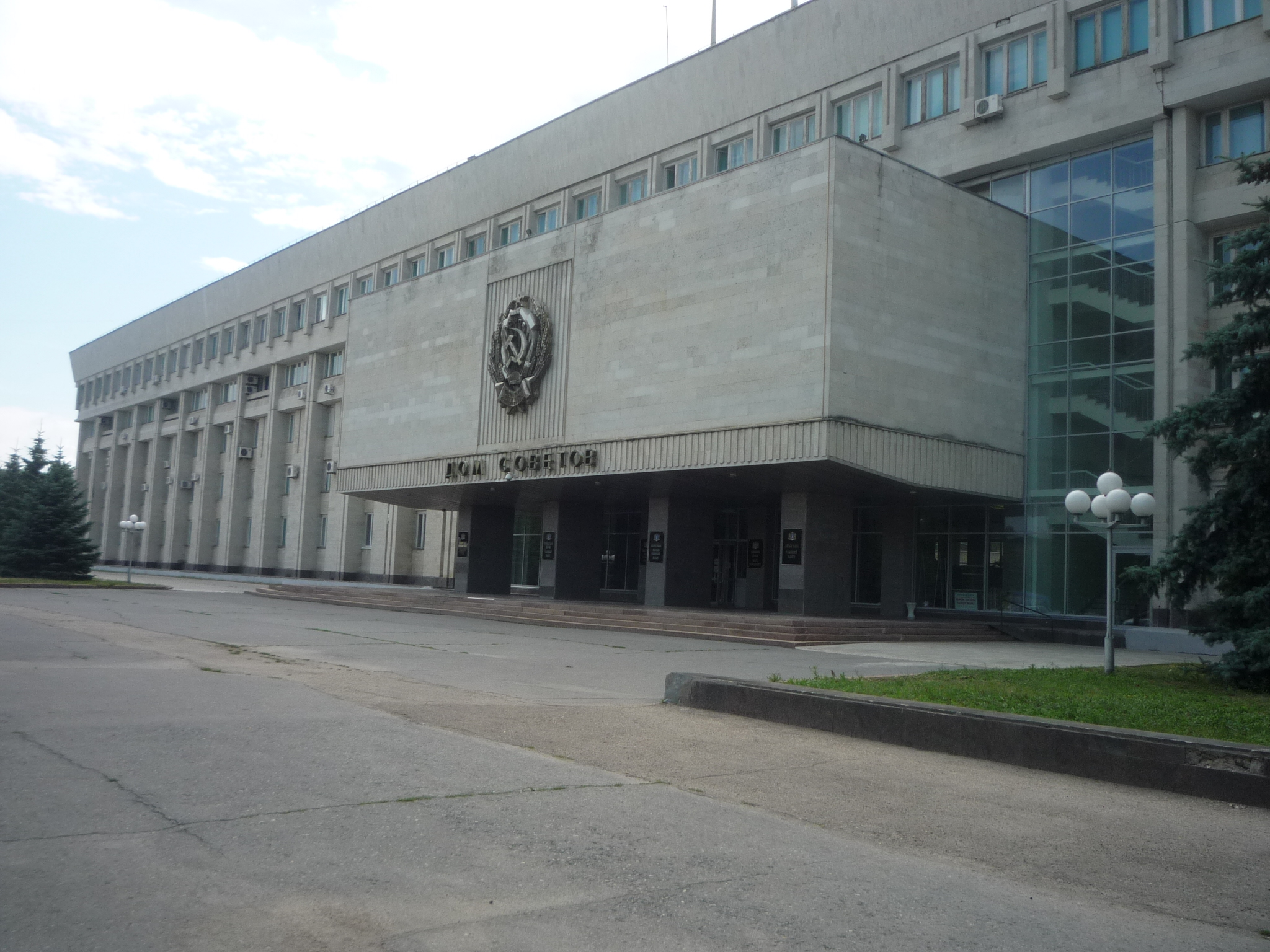
- 1 Radishcheva Street, Ulyanovsk

Website
- zsuo.ru

The Legislative Assembly of Ulyanovsk Oblast (Russian: Законодательное собрание Ульяновской области, romanized: Zakonodatel'noye sobraniye Ul'yanovskoy oblasti) is the regional parliament of Ulyanovsk Oblast, a federal subject of Russia. A total of 36 deputies are elected for five-year terms.

== Elections ==
=== 2018 ===
Party	%	Seats
Communist Party of the Russian Federation	36.24	14
United Russia	33.96	17
Liberal Democratic Party of Russia	13.51	4
Communists of Russia	5.83	1
A Just Russia	3.93	0
Russian Party of Freedom and Justice	1.23	0
Registered voters/turnout	40.31	

=== 2023 ===
Party	%	Seats
United Russia	49.15	27
Communist Party of the Russian Federation	15.96	3
Liberal Democratic Party of Russia	13.56	3
Communists of Russia	7.52	1
A Just Russia	5.15	1
Independent		1
New People	4.48	0
Invalid ballots	3.42	
Registered voters/turnout	34.65	

== List of chairmen ==
Name	Took office	Left office
Sergey Ryabukhin	1997	2001
Boris Zotov	2001	2013
Anatoly Bakayev	2013	2018
Valery Malyshev	2018	—
