= Administrative divisions of Ulyanovsk Oblast =

Ulyanovsk Oblast Russia
- Administrative center: Ulyanovsk

Administrative structure (as of 2012)
- Districts: 21
- Cities/towns: 6
- Urban-type settlements: 29
- Administrative okrugs: 113

Municipal structure (as of 2002)
- Rural settlements: 980 (inhabited); 49 (uninhabited)

Ulyanovsk Oblast is a federal subject of Russia.

== Administrative and municipal divisions ==
Map

Division		Structure		OKATO	OKTMO	Urban-type settlement/ /district-level town*	Rural (administrative okrug)
Division		Administrative	Municipal	OKATO	OKTMO	Urban-type settlement/ /district-level town*	Rural (administrative okrug)
Ulyanovsk (Ульяновск)		city	urban okrug	73 401	73 701		
↳	Leninsky (Ленинский)	(under Ulyanovsk)	—N/a	73401	—N/a		
↳	Zasviyazhsky (Засвияжский)	(under Ulyanovsk)	—N/a	73401	—N/a		
↳	Zavolzhsky (Заволжский)	(under Ulyanovsk)	—N/a	73401	—N/a		
↳	Zheleznodorozhny (Железнодорожный)	(under Ulyanovsk)	—N/a	73401	—N/a		
Dimitrovgrad (Димитровград)		city	urban okrug	73 405	73 705		
Novoulyanovsk (Новоульяновск)		city	urban okrug	73 415	73 715		
Bazarnosyzgansky (Базарносызганский)		district		73 202	73 602	Bazarny Syzgan (Базарный Сызган)	4
Baryshsky (Барышский)		district		73 204	73 604	Barysh (Барыш) town*; imeni V. I. Lenina (Имени В. И. Ленина); Izmaylovo (Измайлово); Starotimoshkino (Старотимошкино); Zhadovka (Жадовка)	4
Veshkaymsky (Вешкаймский)		district		73 207	73 607	Chufarovo (Чуфарово); Veshkayma (Вешкайма)	4
Inzensky (Инзенский)		district		73 210	73 610	Inza (Инза) town*; Glotovka (Глотовка)	7
Karsunsky (Карсунский)		district		73 214	73 614	Karsun (Карсун); Yazykovo (Языково)	6
Kuzovatovsky (Кузоватовский)		district		73 216	73 616	Kuzovatovo (Кузоватово)	5
Maynsky (Майнский)		district		73 220	73 620	Ignatovka (Игнатовка); Mayna (Майна)	5
Melekessky (Мелекесский)		district		73 222	73 622	Mullovka (Мулловка); Novaya Mayna (Новая Майна)	6
Nikolayevsky (Николаевский)		district		73 225	73 625	Nikolayevka (Николаевка)	8
Novomalyklinsky (Новомалыклинский)		district		73 227	73 627		5
Novospassky (Новоспасский)		district		73 229	73 629	Novospasskoye (Новоспасское)	5
Pavlovsky (Павловский)		district		73 232	73 632	Pavlovka (Павловка)	5
Radishchevsky (Радищевский)		district		73 234	73 634	Radishchevo (Радищево)	4
Sengileyevsky (Сенгилеевский)		district		73 236	73 636	Sengiley (Сенгилей) town*; Krasny Gulyay (Красный Гуляй); Silikatny (Силикатный); Tsemzavod (Цемзавод)	3
Starokulatkinsky (Старокулаткинский)		district		73 239	73 639	Staraya Kulatka (Старая Кулатка)	4
Staromaynsky (Старомайнский)		district		73 242	73 642	Staraya Mayna (Старая Майна)	6
Sursky (Сурский)		district		73 244	73 644	Surskoye (Сурское)	6
Terengulsky (Тереньгульский)		district		73 248	73 648	Terenga (Тереньга)	5
Ulyanovsky (Ульяновский)		district		73 252	73 652	Isheyevka (Ишеевка)	5
Tsilninsky (Цильнинский)		district		73 254	73 654	Tsilna (Цильна)	7
Cherdaklinsky (Чердаклинский)		district		73 256	73 656	Cherdakly (Чердаклы)	9
