= Yazykovo =

Yazykovo (Russian: Языково) is the name of several inhabited localities in Russia:

Urban localities

- Yazykovo, Karsunsky District, Ulyanovsk Oblast, an urban-type settlement in Karsunsky District of Ulyanovsk Oblast

Rural localities

- Yazykovo, Blagovarsky District, Republic of Bashkortostan, a selo in Blagovarsky District of the Republic of Bashkortostan
- Yazykovo, Blagoveshchensky District, Republic of Bashkortostan, a village in Blagoveshchensky District of the Republic of Bashkortostan
- Yazykovo, Samara Oblast, a selo in Samara Oblast
- Yazykovo, Terengulsky District, Ulyanovsk Oblast, a selo in Terengulsky District of Ulyanovsk Oblast
- Yazykovo, name of several other rural localities
