= Anatolii Mokrousov =

Ukrainian politician (1943–2021)

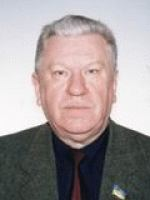

Member of the Verkhovna Rada
- In office 12 May 1990 – 25 May 2006

Personal details
- Born: Anatolii Oleksiyovych Mokrousov; April 14, 1943 Izmaylovo, Baryshsky District, Ulyanovsk Oblast, RSFSR, Soviet Union
- Died: January 9, 2021 (aged 77)
- Cause of death: COVID-19 complications
- Party: Communist Party of Ukraine

Anatolii Oleksiyovych Mokrousov (Ukrainian: Анатолій Олексійович Мокроусов; 14 April 1943 – 9 January 2021) was a Soviet and Ukrainian politician. He graduated from Kyiv National University of Technologies and Design (1970); a member of the Communist Party of Ukraine, he served as a member of the Verkhovna Rada from 1990 until 2006, during four convocations.

Mokrousov died from COVID-19 on 9 January 2021, aged 77.
