= Mayna (inhabited locality) =

Mayna (Russian: Майна) is the name of several urban localities in Russia:

- Mayna, Republic of Khakassia, a work settlement under the administrative jurisdiction of the town of Sayanogorsk, Republic of Khakassia
- Mayna, Ulyanovsk Oblast, a work settlement in Maynsky District of Ulyanovsk Oblast

== See also ==
- Novaya Mayna, an urban locality (a work settlement) in Melekessky District of Ulyanovsk Oblast
- Staraya Mayna, an urban locality (a work settlement) in Staromaynsky District of Ulyanovsk Oblast
