= Baryshsky =

Baryshsky (masculine), Baryshskaya (feminine), or Baryshskoye (neuter) may refer to:

- Baryshsky District, a district of Ulyanovsk Oblast, Russia
- Baryshskoye Urban Settlement, a municipal formation which the town of district significance of Barysh in Baryshsky District of Ulyanovsk Oblast, Russia is incorporated as
