= Sengileyevsky =

Sengileyevsky (masculine), Sengileyevskaya (feminine), or Sengileyevskoye (neuter) may refer to:

- Sengileyevsky District, a district of Ulyanovsk Oblast, Russia
- Sengileyevskoye Urban Settlement, a municipal formation which the town of district significance of Sengiley in Sengileyevsky District of Ulyanovsk Oblast, Russia is incorporated as
- Sengileyevskoye (rural locality), a rural locality (a selo) in Stavropol Krai, Russia
