= Sursky =

Sursky (masculine), Surskaya (feminine), or Surskoye (neuter) may refer to:

- Sursky District, a district of Ulyanovsk Oblast, Russia
- Surskoye, an urban locality (a work settlement) in Sursky District of Ulyanovsk Oblast, Russia
