= History of Chuvashia =

The history of Chuvashia spans from the region's earliest attested habitation by Finno-Ugric peoples to its incorporation into the Russian Empire and its successor states.

== Early history ==
The first inhabitants to leave traces in the area later known as Chuvashia were of the possibly Finno-Ugric Comb Ceramic Culture. Later, people of the possibly Indo-European Battle Axe Culture moved into the area and established several villages. These two peoples assimilated to become the Hillfort Culture of the Middle Volga Area. They had strong economic and linguistic ties with southern steppe peoples like the Scythians and Sarmatians.

The ancestors of the Chuvash were Turkic Bulgars and Suars (Sabirs) residing in the Northern Caucasus in the 5th to 8th centuries (after having been driven from the Pannonian Basin following the death of their greatest leader, Attila). In the 7th and 8th centuries, a part of the Bulgars left for the Balkans, where, together with local Slavs, they established the state of modern Bulgaria. Another part moved to the Middle Volga Region (see Volga Bulgaria), where the Bulgar population that did not adopt Islam formed part of the ethnic foundation of the Chuvash people.

During the Mongol invasion of Volga Bulgaria, the steppe-dwelling Suar migrated north, where Volga Finnic tribes, such as the Mordvins and Mari lived. The Chuvash claim to be descendants of these Suars who assimilated with the Mari.

They became vassals of the Golden Horde in 1242, after a bloody uprising which the Mongols brutally suppressed with an army of 40,000 warriors. Later Mongol and Tatar rulers did not intervene in local internal affairs as long as the annual tribute was paid to Sarai. The Tokhtamysh–Timur war (1361–1395) devastated 80% of the Suar people. When the power of the Golden Horde began to diminish, the local Mishar Tatars Murzas from Pyana and Temnikov tried to rule the Chuvash area.

== Russian Empire ==
During Ivan the Terrible's war of conquest against the Khanate of Kazan, in August 1552, the Chuvash Orsai and Mari Akpar Tokari princes swore their loyalty to the Grand Duchy of Muscovy at Alatyr on the Sura River. This ended nearly 120 years under the rule of the Khanate of Kazan. In return, Ivan promised to honor all historic land rights of the Chuvash and Maris on both sides of the Volga River from the Kerzhenets to the Sviyaga River. In addition, Ivan ordered a five-year period freedom from tribute for the Chuvash and Mari leaders. The Chuvash provided 15,000 soldiers and the Mari 10,000 to Ivan's army for the final attack against Kazan, giving the Muscovites a force of 100,000 against the Khanate's 30,000 Nogai Tatars defending the fortified city.

Disappointed by Russian rule, a portion of the Chuvash population rebelled and joined with the Mari during the Kazan War of 1552–1594. During the Time of Troubles, they joined the troops of the False Dmitri.

Within the Russian Empire, the territory of modern Chuvashia was divided into two administrative districts: the northern part under the Kazan Governorate and the southern part under the Simbirsk Governorate. The border ran roughly from Kurmish to Buinsk.

The Chuvash and Mari joined the Stenka Razin and Pugachev rebellions in 1667–1671 and 1773–1775 respectively, when the Volga area from Astrakhan to Nizhni Novgorod was in open revolt. During these years, many Chuvash escaped east to the southern Urals.

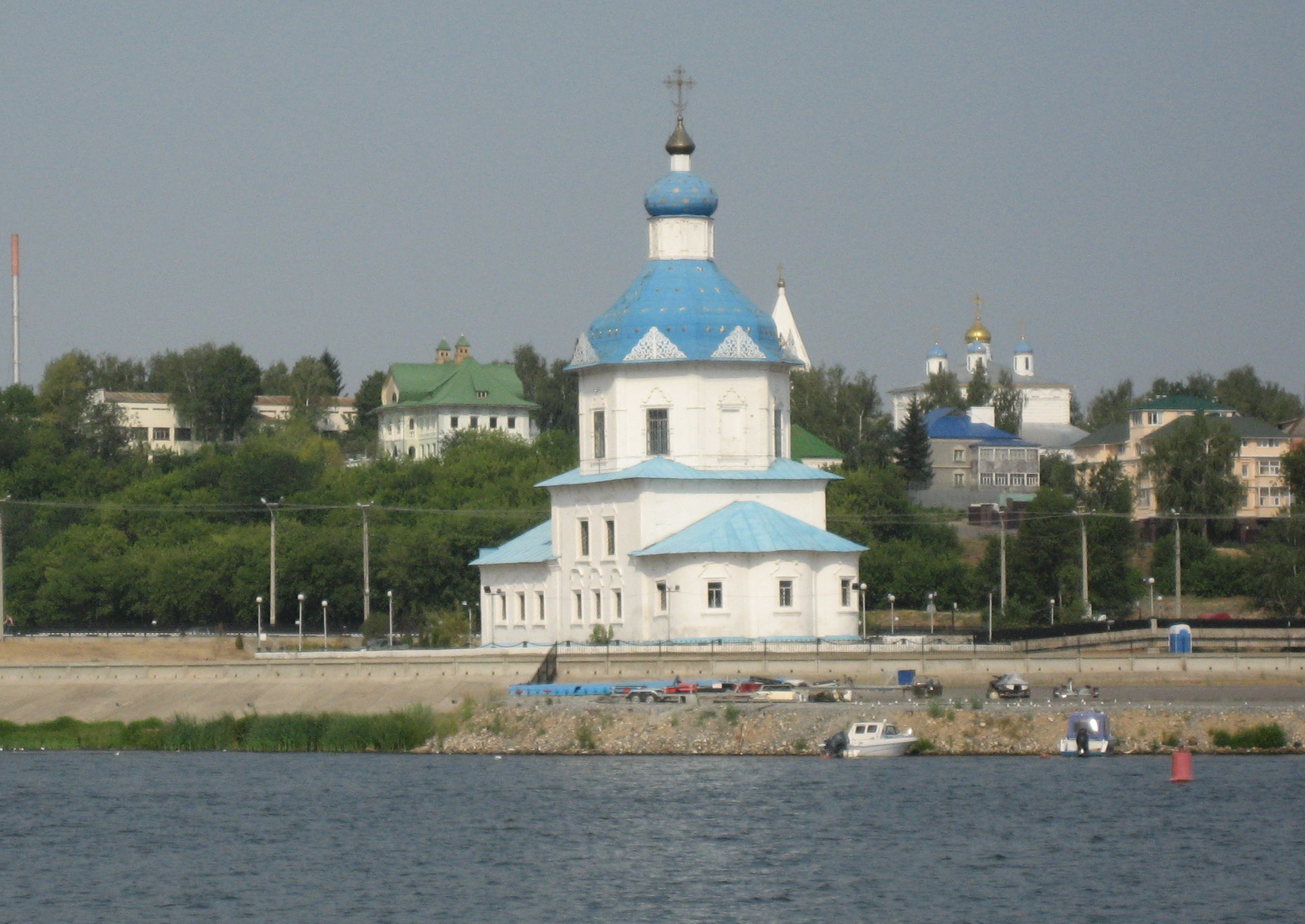
Church in Cheboksary

Between 1650 and 1850, the Russian Orthodox Church sent Chuvash-speaking missionaries to try to convert the Chuvash to the Orthodox faith. A group of these missionaries created a written Chuvash language. The first Chuvash grammar was published in 1769. Chuvash had earlier been written with a Runic script or the Arabic alphabet. A revised Cyrillic alphabet for Chuvash was first introduced in 1873 by Ivan Yakovlevich Yakovlev. The Latin alphabet has been used as well, though there is no standard transcription. Most of the Chuvash who stayed in the area became Orthodox Christians, but some remained pagan.

A number of Russian noble families received large estates in the Chuvash lands as reward for their services to the Tsar. The formerly independent landowning Chuvash peasants became serfs to rich Russian landowners. Russian became the official language. Few attempts were made to provide primary education in the Chuvash language, and all higher education was in Russian.

After Alexander II abolished serfdom, many land-hungry Chuvash peasants moved to other areas in Russia to seek their own land. Between 1860 and 1914, nearly half of the Chuvash population left their home areas. The final wave of migration occurred during the Stolypin agrarian reforms.

== Soviet Union ==
During the 19th and early 20th century, national feelings started to grow among the Chuvash intelligentsia. They connected with other minority pro-independence movements in the middle Volga area. Marxist ideology gained popularity among the poorest peasants and industrial workers. On May 15, 1917, the Chuvash joined the Idel-Ural Movement and in December 1917 joined the short-lived Idel-Ural State, when an agreement was reached with Tatar representatives to draw the eastern border of Chuvashia at the Sviyaga River.

The Chuvash promised to respect the Islamic Tatars' religion and grant them local and cultural autonomy inside the League of Idel Ural States. The southern border with the Mordvins was set along the Sura River, with equal rights guaranteed to the Chuvash living west of the Sura. In the south, the border went along the Barysh, Bolshoi Akla and Tsilna Rivers between the Sura and Sviyaga. In the north, there was a dispute with representatives of the Mari-populated Tsykma (Kozmodemyansk) and other areas in Chuvashia.

In 1918–1919, the Russian Civil War encompassed the area. This ended with victory for the Bolsheviks, who were mainly ethnic Russians, with strong support from Nizhny Novgorod troops. The local Chuvash independence-minded politicians were executed by the Bolsheviks.

To gain support from the local population, Lenin ordered the creation of a Chuvash state within the Russian SFSR. On June 24, 1920, the Chuvash Autonomous Oblast was formed, which was transformed into the Chuvash ASSR in April 1925.

The 1930–1931 Communist campaign against the rich kulak peasant class, which resulted in their deportation to Gulag prison camps and the elimination of independent peasant farms, hit the Chuvash ASSR's agricultural production hard. The Great Purge in 1936–1938 dealt a great blow to the Chuvash intelligentsia; many were shot or deported to prison camps. Most of the local Chuvash teachers were shot, making it difficult to teach Chuvash, as the Russian replacements did not know the language. Ethnic Russians kept control of the area, and the Russification of the Chuvash and Mari peoples intensified.

From 1930 to 1940, a shift from mainly agriculture to industry was initiated. By 1940, the Chuvash ASSR produced 35,000,000 kWh of electricity, 848,000 m^{2} raw timber, 369,000 m^{2} sawn timber, 40,000 m cotton cloth, 200,000 pairs of hosiery, 184,000 pairs of leather footwear, and 600 tons of animal fats.

According to an order dated May 28, 1940 by the Central Committee of Communist Party, 20,000 Kolkhoz peasant families of Belarusian, Chuvash, Mordvin and Tatar origin were transferred to the "New districts of the Leningrad Oblast and the Karelian Autonomous Soviet Socialist Republic", recently conquered in the Soviet-Finnish war. In 1941, another 20,000 families followed, each family averaging five persons. Lavrentiy Beria even suggested to transfer the entire Chuvash population from Chuvashia to Karelia to form a population security belt "against the Finnish Fascists".

During the Great Patriotic War and the postwar industrialization period, more and more Russians moved to the expanding towns of Chuvashia. The rural population remained mostly agriculturally oriented Chuvashians and Kuruk Maris. In the south of the republic, Russians and other minorities, such as Ukrainians, moved in to work in the newly created Chuvash Forest Industry Combinate.

In 1964, the Chuvash ASSR produced 350,000,000 kWh electricity, 1,073,000 m^{2} raw timber, 760,000 m^{2} sawn timber, 113,100,000 m cotton cloth, 28,800,000 pairs of hosiery, 1,800,000 pairs of leather footwear, and 3,200 tons of animal fats.

On January 1, 1966, the population of the Chuvash ASSR was 1,178,000.

In 1990, the republic was renamed the Chuvash Soviet Socialist Republic.

== Post-Soviet period ==
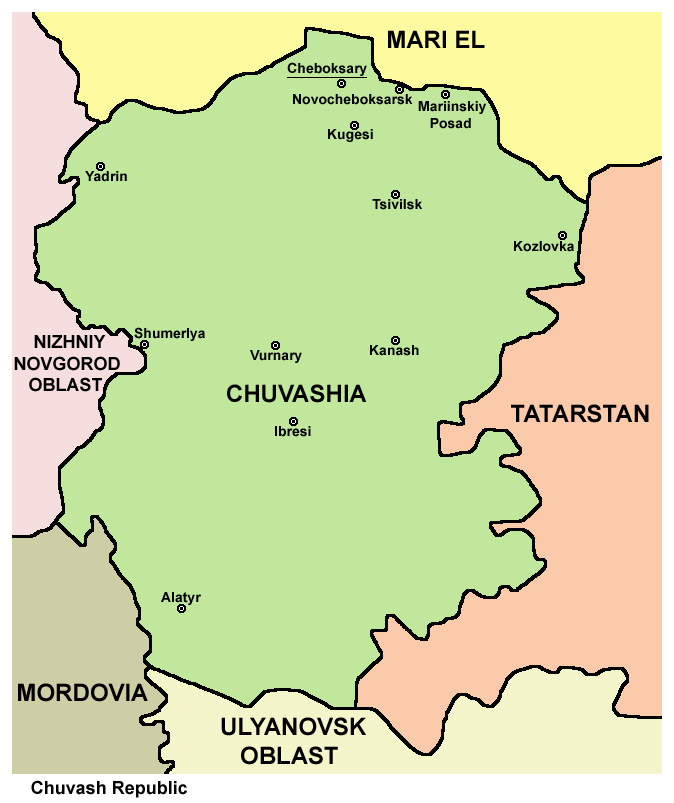
Map of modern Chuvash Republic

In 1992, it was given its present name.

The Chuvash Republic is an autonomous republic within the Russian Federation. As a republic, the region has greater sovereignty than other areas of Russia in determining local policies and procedures. Nikolay Fyodorov, a former minister of justice of the Russian Federation, was elected the first President of the Chuvash Republic in 1994. He has a reputation as a pro-market reformer and has pressed the region to establish closer economic ties with other countries. He has also encouraged the growth of small businesses. The mayor of Cheboksary, Anatoly Igumnov, is also eager to work with international companies. Both republic and city governments have departments of foreign economic relations to work with foreign businesspeople.

As of 2011, the President of the Republic is Mikhail Ignatyev.

== Literature ==
- Т.Н. Таймасова, В.В. Степанов, «Краткая история Чувашии и чувашского народа», Чувашское книжное издательство. Чебоксары, 2019.
