= Maina =

Maina may refer to:

- Maina (Cook Islands), an island in the Aitutaki group of the Cook Islands
- Maina, Goa, a village in India
- Maina, Iran, a village in Razavi Khorasan Province, Iran
- Maina people, the Mainan linguistic group, ranging along the north bank of the Marañón River in South America.
- Maina Kaderi, a Village Development Committee in Saptari District in the Sagarmatha Zone of south-eastern Nepal
- Maina (name)
- Maina Sahasrabahu, a Village Development Committee in Saptari District in the Sagarmatha Zone of south-eastern Nepal
- Maïna, a Canadian drama film released in 2013

== See also ==
- Mani Peninsula, a Greek peninsula
- Mayna (disambiguation)
- Myna bird
- Mynaa, a Tamil film
- Villamaina, an Italian municipality
