= Khovrino =

Khovrino may refer to:

- Khovrino District, a district of Northern Administrative Okrug, Moscow, Russia
- Khovrino (Moscow Metro), a station of the Moscow Metro

== See also ==
- Khovrino (rural locality), a list of rural localities in Russia
