= Khovrino (rural locality) =

Khovrino (Russian: Ховрино) is the name of several rural localities in Russia:

- Khovrino, Moscow Oblast, a village under the administrative jurisdiction of the city of Mytishchi, Mytishchinsky District, Moscow Oblast
- Khovrino, Tver Oblast, a village in Sandovsky District of Tver Oblast
- Khovrino, Ulyanovsk Oblast, a selo under the administrative jurisdiction of Veshkaymsky Settlement Okrug of Veshkaymsky District, Ulyanovsk Oblast
