= Mullovka =

Urban locality in Ulyanovsk Oblast, Russia

Mullovka Мулловка
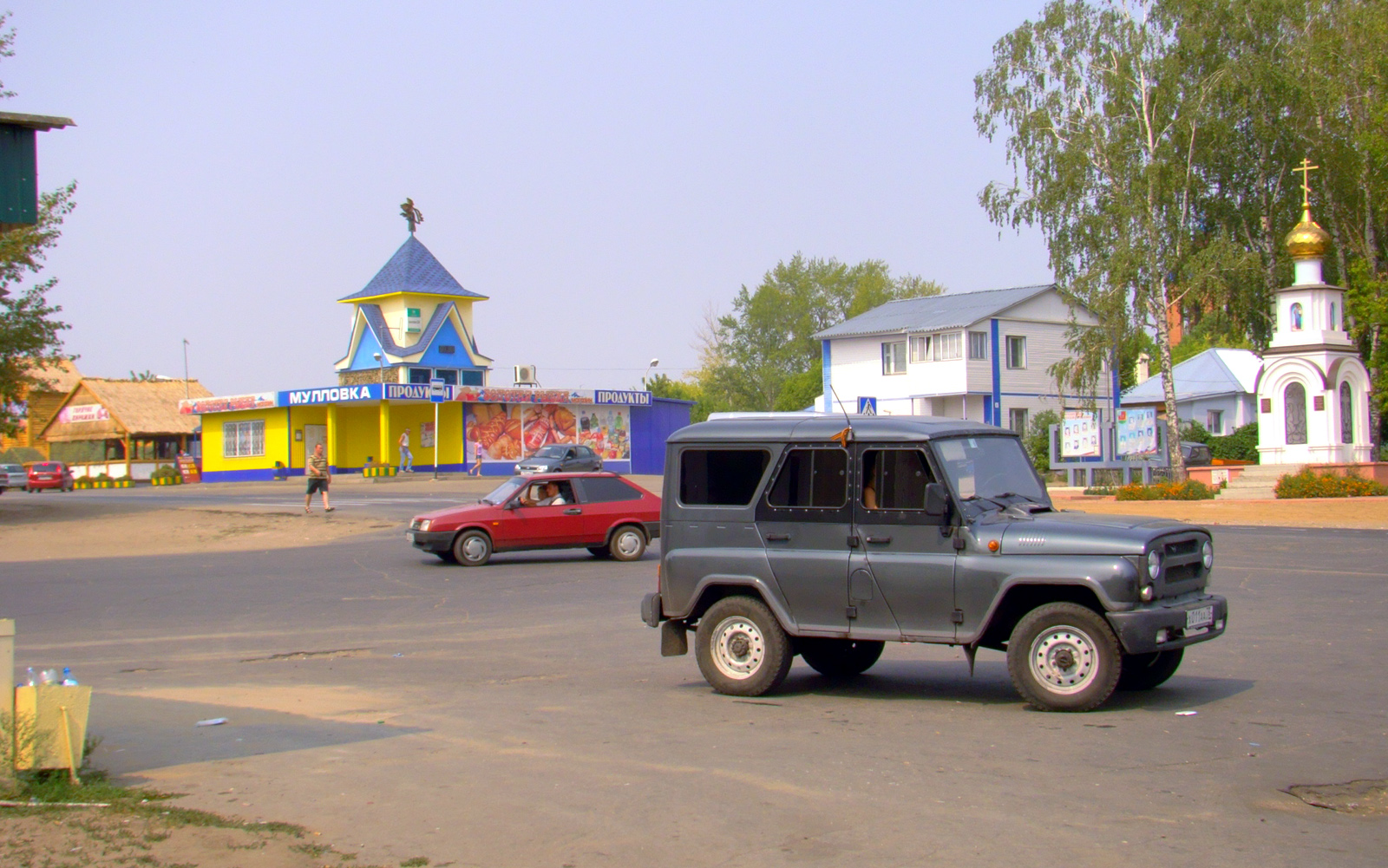
- Stop of intercity buses in Mullovka

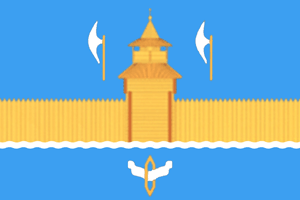
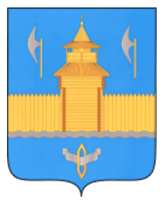
- Flag Coat of arms
- Interactive map of Mullovka
- Location of Mullovka Mullovka (Ulyanovsk Oblast)
- Coordinates: 54°12′N 49°24′E
- Country: Russia
- Federal subject: Ulyanovsk Oblast
- Founded: 1706

Population
  - Estimate (2021): 5,029 )
- Time zone: UTC+4 (UTC+04:00)
- Postal code: 433550
- OKTMO ID: 73622153051

Mullovka (Russian: Мулло́вка) is an urban locality (urban-type settlement) in Melekessky District of Ulyanovsk Oblast, Russia. Population: 6,168 (2010 census); 6,439 (2002 census); 6,839 (1989 Soviet census).
