= Kyiv National University of Technologies and Design =

Public university in Kyiv, Ukraine

Kyiv National University of Technologies and Design (KNUTD)
- НЗВО «Київський національний університет технологій та дизайну» (КНУТД)
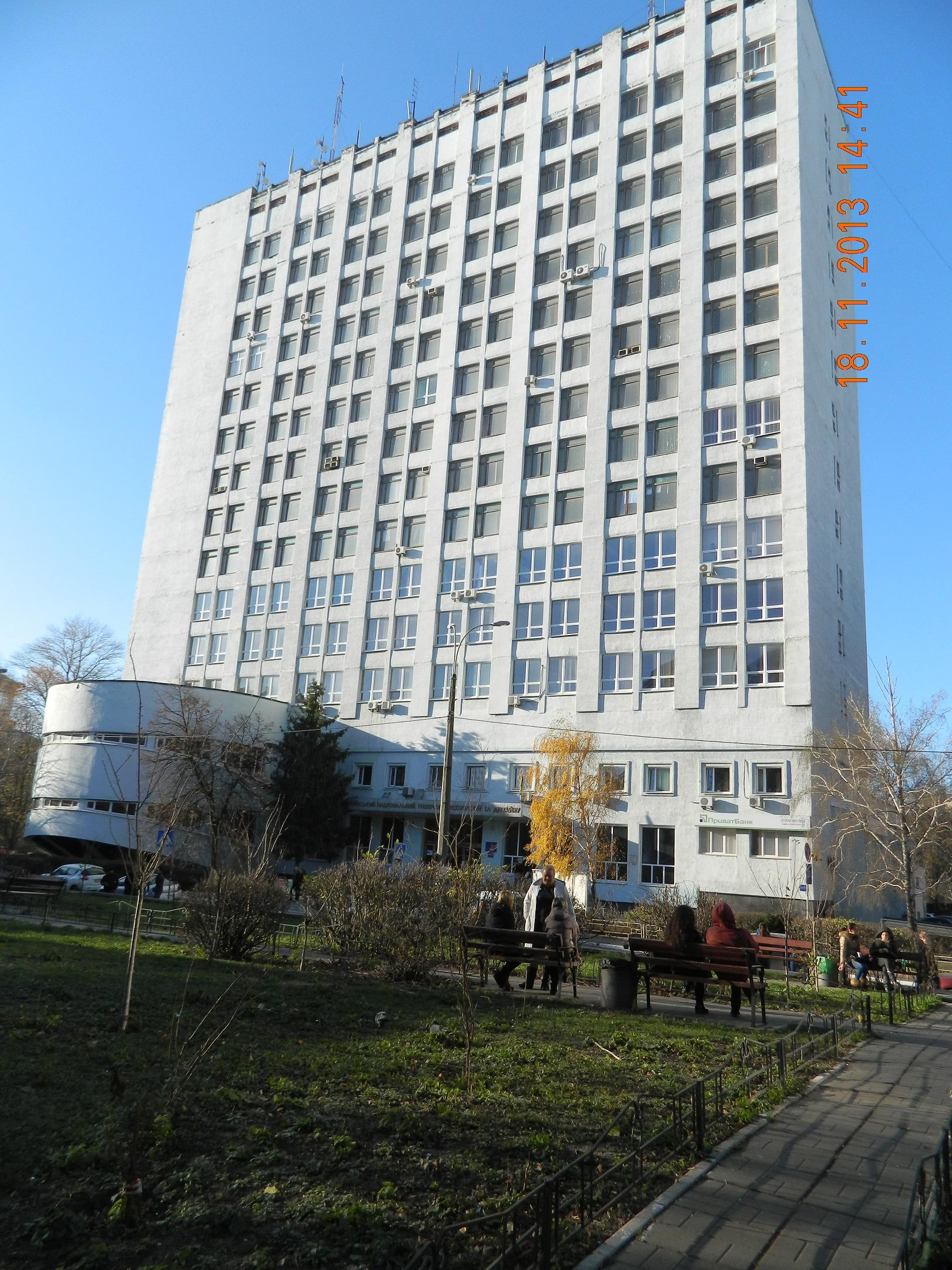
- Type: National university
- Established: 1930
- Affiliations: Ministry of Education and Science of Ukraine
- Rector: Dr Ivan Gryshchenko
- Administrative staff: around 500
- Students: around 10,000
- Location: Kyiv, Ukraine; 50.4276°N 30.4662°E
- Website: en.knutd.edu.ua

University rankings

Regional – Overall
- QS Emerging Europe and Central Asia: 351-400 (2022)

The Kyiv National University of Technologies and Design ( abbr. KNUTD, Ukrainian: Київський національний університет технологій та дизайну, КНУТД) is a state-sponsored university in Kyiv, Ukraine. Areas of knowledge taught: Education/Pedagogy, Culture and art, Humanities, Social and behavioral sciences, Management and administration, Legal Sciences, Natural Sciences, Information Technology, Mechanical engineering, Electrical engineering, Automation and instrumentation, Chemical and bioengineering, Production and Technology, Healthcare, Service sector, Public administration and administration (MBA).

== History ==
On October 1, 1930, the opening of the Kyiv Polytechnic Institute of the Leather Industry, created by the decision of the Supreme Council of the National Economy on the basis of the Kyiv Polytechnic Institute, took place.

The founders of the educational institution were: Alexander Markovich Ginzburg (director), associate professor Mikhail Pavlovich Kotov (later professor, doctor of technical sciences, honored worker of science and technology), professor Yury Dmitrievich Sokolov (later a corresponding member of the Academy of Sciences of the Ukrainian SSR), professor P. E. Dushsky, Associate Professor Kazansky N. G. (later Doctor of Technical Sciences, Professor), Nikitin V. N., Pospekhov D. A., Topolyansky M. G. and others. The first legal address of the modern university was: Bolshaya Zhitomirskaya street 32.

At the time of opening, the institute included 3 faculties: chemical-technological, mechanical-technological, engineering-economic. In 1930, enrollment for 1 course was announced. The second, third and fourth courses were staffed by students from the Kyiv, Kharkiv and Odesa polytechnic institutes.

In the 1930–1931 academic year, 32 teachers worked at the institute.

The first graduation of specialists took place in 1932. During the first 5 years (1931–1935) the Institute trained 102 engineers. The annual graduation in 1936 and 1937 amounted to 110 specialists.

Since 1937, the university (then the institute) has been located on Nemirovich-Danchenko Street 2 (at that time Klovskaya Street, 16), where before the revolution there were barracks of the Mirgorodsky Cavalry Regiment. The building on Bolshaya Zhitomirskaya Street was transferred to a hostel.

During the period 1936–1941, 1158 specialists were graduated. In 1941, the last, pre-war graduation of engineers was carried out - 240 specialists

=== Evacuation during the Second World War ===
From the first days of the war, many teachers, staff, graduates and students of the Institute voluntarily joined the Red Army. They participated in the fighting on all fronts of the Second World War.

At the end of June 1941, the institute received an order to prepare for evacuation. And already on October 1, 1941, two car trains with property and a small amount of staff of the Institute arrived at the Khrompik station in the city of Pervouralsk, Sverdlovsk Region. The institute was located on the basis of the tannery in the town of Khrompik. Already in the summer of 1942, 35 engineers were graduated, and in 1943-1944 the institute graduated 38 engineers.

In June 1944, the institute returned to Kyiv and began to train specialists not only from the available specialties (chemical-technological, mechanical-technological, engineering-economic), but also in two specialties "Technology of clothing production" and "Technology of knitwear production". Since that time, the institute has been called the Kyiv Technological Institute of Light Industry (KTILP). Under this name the institute existed for 48 years.

=== Nowadays ===
In 1993, the Kyiv Technological Institute of Light Industry was accredited and renamed the State Academy of Light Industry of Ukraine (GALPU), and on August 30, 1999 - the Kyiv State University of Technology and Design (KGUTD).

Given the national and international recognition of the results of activities and a significant contribution to the development of national education and science, by decree of the President of Ukraine L. D. Kuchma dated August 7, 2001 No. 591/2001, the university received the status of a national university and became known as the Kyiv National University of Technology and Design).

In 2015, by the Order of the Cabinet of Ministers, a higher educational institution, the Intersectoral Academy of Management, was attached to KNUTD.

Since 2015, the university has been preparing specialists capable of working in the field of entrepreneurship and law. The university also prepares candidates and doctors of sciences in 12 specialties, who can defend their dissertations in six specialized academic councils.

The teaching staff of the university includes more than 70 professors, more than 260 associate professors.

Infrastructurally, the university consists of 15 educational buildings, 9 dormitories, 21 buildings for various purposes, a stadium and several sports grounds. The university library was founded in 1930, its fund has more than 1 million copies, including more than 700 thousand copies of educational publications.

In 2020, the university teaches at 7 faculties (fashion industry, mechatronics and computer technology, chemical and biopharmaceutical technologies, economics and business, design, entrepreneurship and law, market, information and innovative technologies) and 3 institutes (Educational and Scientific Institute of Modern Technologies education, Educational and Scientific Institute of Engineering and Information Technologies, Research Institute of Economics).

In 2018, 10,000 students studied at the university in the specialties of 15 branches of knowledge, including more than 500 foreign students from 26 countries.

== Departments ==
The Faculties

- Fashion Industry;
- Design;
- Mechatronics and Computer Technologies;
- Chemical and Biopharmaceutical Technologies;
- Economics and Business;
- Market, Information and Innovative Technologies (Cherkasy Campus).

The Institutes

- Kyiv Institute of the Qilu University of Technology (China)
- Engineering and Information Technologies
- Law and Modern Learning Technologies
- Internationalization of Higher Education and Science
- Research Institute of Economics

The Colleges

- Professional College of Art and Design of KNUTD
- Lviv Professional College of Fashion Industry of KNUTD
- Chernihiv Professional College of Engineering and Design of KNUTD,

The Centres and Educational Complexes

- Centre of Pre-university and Individual Education.
- Educational and Scientific Complex of Military Training.
- Ukrainian-Polish Training Centre.
- Ukrainian-Azerbaijani Cultural and Educational Centre.
- Centre of Labour and Career.
- Centre of Physical Education and Health.
- Centre of Culture and Arts.
- Energy Efficiency Centre.

== Awards and reputation ==
- QS EECA University Rankings 2021: 301-350 place

== Famous graduates ==
- Volodymyr Kharchenko
- Anatolii Mokrousov
- Volodymyr Radchenko
- Mikhail Voronin (fashion designer)

== See also ==
List of universities in Ukraine
