= Mayna =

Mayna may refer to:

- Mayna (inhabited locality), several inhabited localities in Russia
- Mayna (Rohtak), a village in Rohtak District of the State of Haryana in India
- Mayna (plant), a genus of plants in the family Achariaceae
- Mayna (tribe), one of several Jivaroan peoples in the upper Amazon
- Myna (film), a 2013 Kannada film
