= Krasny Gulyay =

Krasny Gulyay Красный Гуляй
- Urban-type settlement
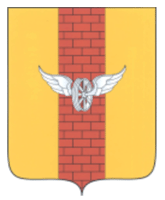
- Coat of arms
- Interactive map of Krasny Gulyay
- Location of Krasny Gulyay Krasny Gulyay (Ulyanovsk Oblast)
- Coordinates: 54.0262°N 48.3316°E
- Country: Russia
- Federal subject: Ulyanovsk Oblast
- Administrative district: Sengileyevsky District
- Founded: 1920

Population (2010 Census)
  - Total: 3,000
  - Estimate (2021): 2,630 (−12.3%)
- Time zone: UTC+4 (UTC+04:00)
- Postal code: 433396
- OKTMO ID: 73636153051

Krasny Gulyay (Russian: Красный Гуляй) is an urban locality (an urban-type settlement) in Sengileyevsky District of Ulyanovsk Oblast, Russia. Population: 3,000 (2010 census); 3,107 (2002 census); 4,197 (1989 Soviet census).
