= Zhadovka =

Zhadovka Жадовка
- Urban-type settlement
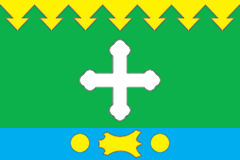
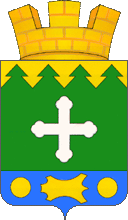
- Flag Coat of arms
- Interactive map of Zhadovka
- Location of Zhadovka Zhadovka (Ulyanovsk Oblast)
- Coordinates: 53.5740°N 46.9485°E
- Country: Russia
- Federal subject: Ulyanovsk Oblast
- Administrative district: Baryshsky District

Population (2010 Census)
  - Total: 1,753
  - Estimate (2021): 1,507 (−14%)
- Time zone: UTC+4 (UTC+04:00)
- Postal code: 433731
- OKTMO ID: 73604152051

Zhadovka (Russian: Жадовка) is an urban locality (an urban-type settlement) in Baryshsky District of Ulyanovsk Oblast, Russia. Population: 1,753 (2010 census); 2,117 (2002 census); 2,387 (1989 Soviet census).
