= Ignatovka =

Ignatovka Игнатовка
- Urban-type settlement
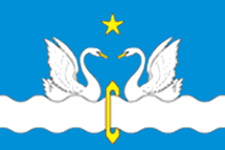
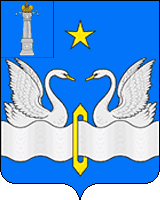
- Flag Coat of arms
- Interactive map of Ignatovka
- Location of Ignatovka Ignatovka (Ulyanovsk Oblast)
- Coordinates: 53.9468°N 47.6555°E
- Country: Russia
- Federal subject: Ulyanovsk Oblast
- Administrative district: Maynsky District
- Elevation: 200 m (660 ft)

Population (2010 Census)
  - Total: 2,285
  - Estimate (2021): 1,915 (−16.2%)
- Time zone: UTC+4 (UTC+04:00)
- Postal code: 433152
- OKTMO ID: 73620158051

Ignatovka (Russian: Игнатовка) is an urban locality (an urban-type settlement) in Maynsky District of Ulyanovsk Oblast, Russia. Population: 2,285 (2010 census); 2,878 (2002 census); 3,250 (1989 Soviet census).
