= Imeni V. I. Lenina =

Imeni V. I. Lenina Имени В. И. Ленина
- Urban-type settlement
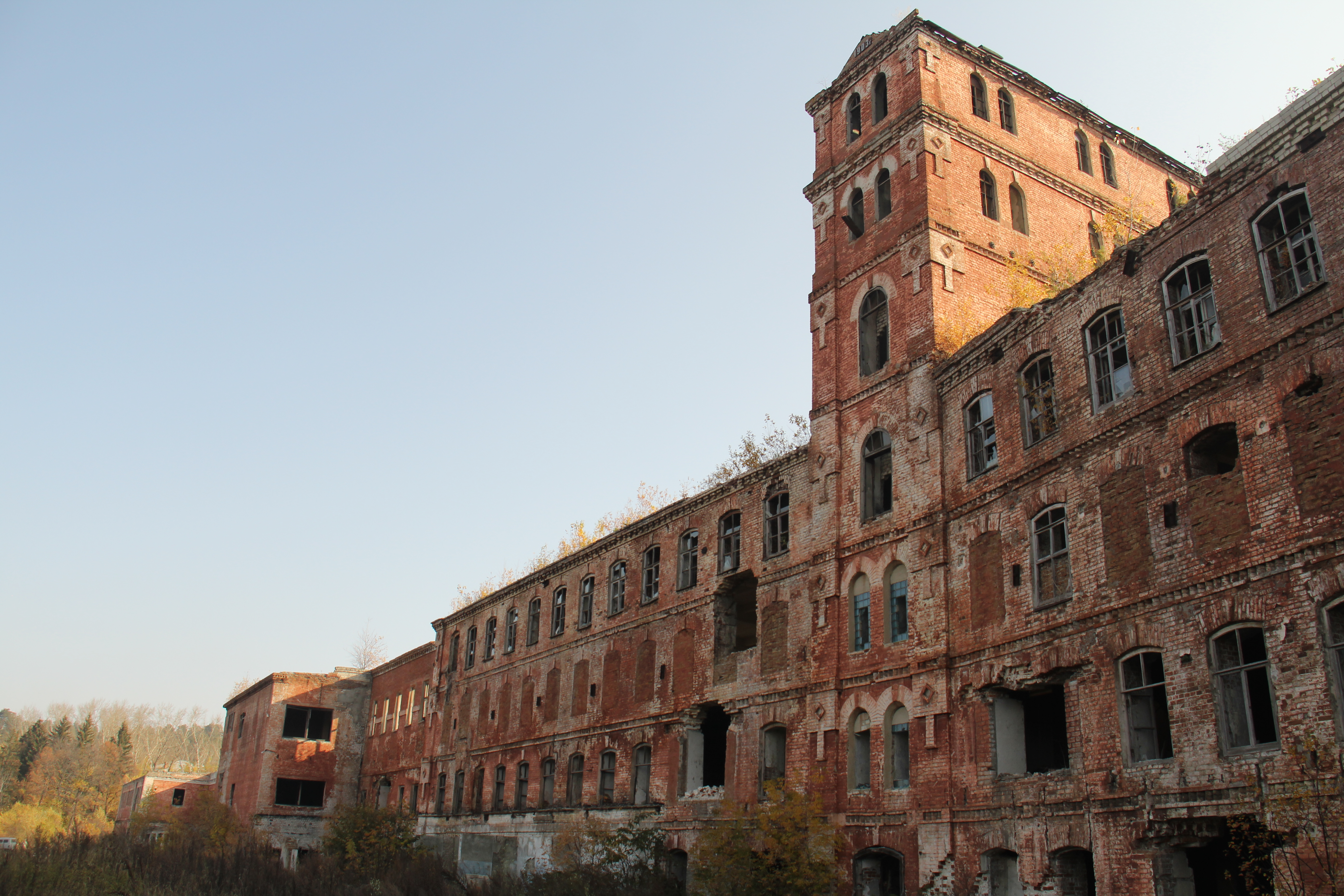
- Abandoned factory in R.P. Im. Lenin

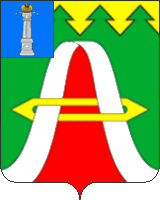
- Flag Coat of arms
- Interactive map of Imeni V. I. Lenina
- Location of Imeni V. I. Lenina Imeni V. I. Lenina (Ulyanovsk Oblast)
- Coordinates: 53.5585°N 46.9792°E
- Country: Russia
- Federal subject: Ulyanovsk Oblast
- Administrative district: Baryshsky District
- Founded: 1848
- Elevation: 217 m (712 ft)

Population (2010 Census)
  - Total: 2,515
  - Estimate (2021): 1,972 (−21.6%)
- Time zone: UTC+4 (UTC+04:00)
- Postal code: 433734
- OKTMO ID: 73604156051

Imeni V. I. Lenina (Russian: Имени В. И. Ленина) is an urban locality (an urban-type settlement) in Baryshsky District of Ulyanovsk Oblast, Russia. Population: 2,515 (2010 census); 2,915 (2002 census); 3,338 (1989 Soviet census).
