= Silikatny =

Silikatny Силикатный
- Urban-type settlement
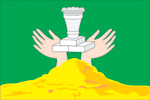
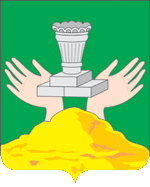
- Flag Coat of arms
- Interactive map of Silikatny
- Location of Silikatny Silikatny (Ulyanovsk Oblast)
- Coordinates: 53.9881°N 48.3311°E
- Country: Russia
- Federal subject: Ulyanovsk Oblast
- Administrative district: Sengileyevsky District
- Founded: 1951

Population (2010 Census)
  - Total: 2,989
  - Estimate (2021): 2,679 (−10.4%)
- Time zone: UTC+4 (UTC+04:00)
- Postal code: 433393
- OKTMO ID: 73636157051

Silikatny (Russian: Силикатный) is an urban locality (an urban-type settlement) in Sengileyevsky District of Ulyanovsk Oblast, Russia. Population: 2,989 (2010 census); 3,646 (2002 census); 4,099 (1989 Soviet census).
