= Chufarovo =

Chufarovo Чуфарово
- Urban-type settlement
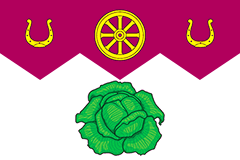
- Flag
- Interactive map of Chufarovo
- Location of Chufarovo Chufarovo (Ulyanovsk Oblast)
- Coordinates: 54.0944°N 47.3335°E
- Country: Russia
- Federal subject: Ulyanovsk Oblast
- Administrative district: Veshkaymsky District

Population (2010 Census)
  - Total: 2,240
  - Estimate (2021): 1,658 (−26%)
- Time zone: UTC+4 (UTC+04:00)
- Postal code: 433120
- OKTMO ID: 73607158051

Chufarovo (Russian: Чуфарово) is an urban locality (an urban-type settlement) in Veshkaymsky District of Ulyanovsk Oblast, Russia. Population: 2,240 (2010 census); 2,695 (2002 census); 2,956 (1989 Soviet census).
