= Cherdaklinsky District =

Cherdaklinsky District Чердаклинский район (Russian)
- District
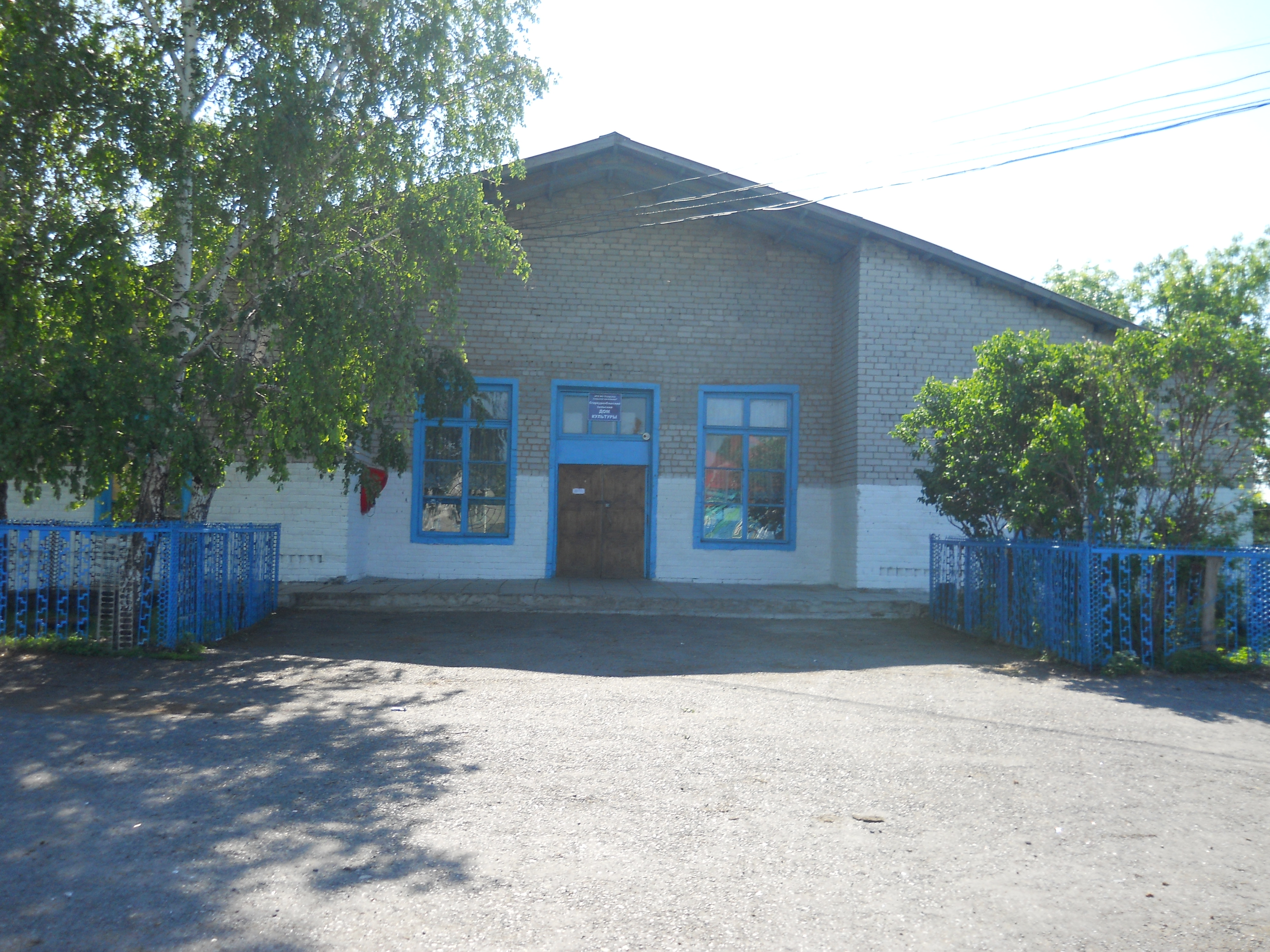
- Rural Culture House, Cherdaklinsky District

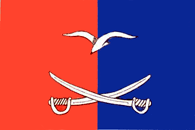
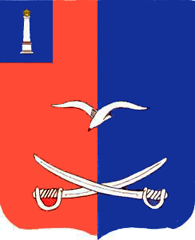
- Flag Coat of arms
- Location of Cherdaklinsky District in Ulyanovsk Oblast
- Coordinates: 54°20′N 48°50′E
- Country: Russia
- Federal subject: Ulyanovsk Oblast
- Established: 16 July 1928
- Administrative center: Cherdakly

Area
  - Total: 2,442.3 km^{2} (943.0 sq mi)

Population (2010 Census)
  - Total: 41,449
  - Density: 16.971/km^{2} (43.955/sq mi)
  - Urban: 27.6%
  - Rural: 72.4%

Administrative structure
  - Administrative divisions: 1 Settlement okrugs, 9 Rural okrugs
  - Inhabited localities: 1 urban-type settlements, 42 rural localities

Municipal structure
  - Municipally incorporated as: Cherdaklinsky Municipal District
  - Municipal divisions: 1 urban settlements, 9 rural settlements
- Time zone: UTC+4 (UTC+04:00)
- OKTMO ID: 73656000
- Website: http://cherdakli.com/

Cherdaklinsky District (Russian: Чердакли́нский райо́н) is an administrative and municipal district (raion), one of the twenty-one in Ulyanovsk Oblast, Russia. It is located in the northeast of the oblast. The area of the district is 2,442.3 square kilometers (943.0 sq mi). Its administrative center is the urban locality (a work settlement) of Cherdakly. Population: 41,449 (2010 Census); 43,865 (2002 census); 40,887 (1989 Soviet census). The population of Cherdakly accounts for 27.6% of the district's total population.
