= Maina (name) =

Maina is a name with multiple independent origins.

Maina is a name of age sets among some East African communities (mostly Bantu). To a lesser extent it is used as a name among the Abagusii (or Bantu Kosova) ethnic group.

It is an Italian surname that belongs to the region of the Italian Alps, as well as a Latvian language personal name, descended from the Finnish language Maini.

Maina/Moyna/Mayna is an Assamese nickname in India. Maina/Mena/Meena/Mina is an Indian tribe.

In the Philippines, girls born on the first of May are sometimes named Mayna.

== Nigeria ==
- Maina Maaji Lawan (born 1954), former Nigerian politician, CEO of Dansarki Farms
- Adamu Maina Waziri (born 1952), Nigerian politician and Minister of Police Affairs
- Hajiya Zainab Maina (born 1948), Nigerian politician and Minister of Women Affairs and Social Development
- Mohammed Maina, Nigerian politician and former governor of Borno State

== Kenya ==
Maina is a name of Kenyan origin that in line with Kikuyu customs is linked to a certain age group or age set among the maasai community.

- Charles Gitonga Maina (born 1976), Kenyan film actor and basketball player
- Ephraim Maina, Kenyan politician and Member of Parliament for Safina
- Esther Wanjiru Maina (born 1977), Kenyan long-distance runner and 1998 Commonwealth Games champion
- James Maina Boi (1954–2004), Kenyan middle-distance runner and 1979 African champion
- James Maina Kamau, Kenyan politician and Member of the National Assembly for the Party of National Unity
- Joseph Maina Mungai (1932–2003), Kenyan medical academic and researcher
- Leonard Mucheru Maina (born 1978), Kenyan long-distance runner formerly competing for Bahrain
- Maina wa Kinyatti (born bef. 1982), Kenyan Marxist historian and former political prisoner
- Steve Maina (born 1970), Kenyan-born New Zealand Anglican bishop

== Others ==
- Maina Gielgud (born 1945), British dancer and dance administrator
- Maïna Kataki (1923–2011), French-Indian feminist author
- Maina Sage (born 1975), French politician
- Maina Sunuwar, Nepalese murder victim in 2004
- Pete Maina (born 1963), American professional fisherman and personality
- Anthony Maina Njoroge (2000 – ), Kenyan academic and aspiring Civil Engineer and Computer Scientist.
