= Starotimoshkino =

Starotimoshkino Старотимошкино
- Urban-type settlement
- Flag
- Interactive map of Starotimoshkino
- Location of Starotimoshkino Starotimoshkino (Ulyanovsk Oblast)
- Coordinates: 53.7220°N 47.5351°E
- Country: Russia
- Federal subject: Ulyanovsk Oblast
- Administrative district: Baryshsky District

Population (2010 Census)
  - Total: 3,897
  - Estimate (2021): 3,323 (−14.7%)
- Time zone: UTC+4 (UTC+04:00)
- Postal code: 433742
- OKTMO ID: 73604158051

Starotimoshkino (Russian: Старотимошкино, Tatar: Зөябаш, romanized: Zöyäbaş) is an urban locality (an urban-type settlement) in Baryshsky District of Ulyanovsk Oblast, Russia. Population: 3,897 (2010 census); 4,097 (2002 census); 4,556 (1989 Soviet census).
