= Karsun =

Urban settlement in Ulyanovsk Oblast

Karsun Карсун
- Urban-type settlement
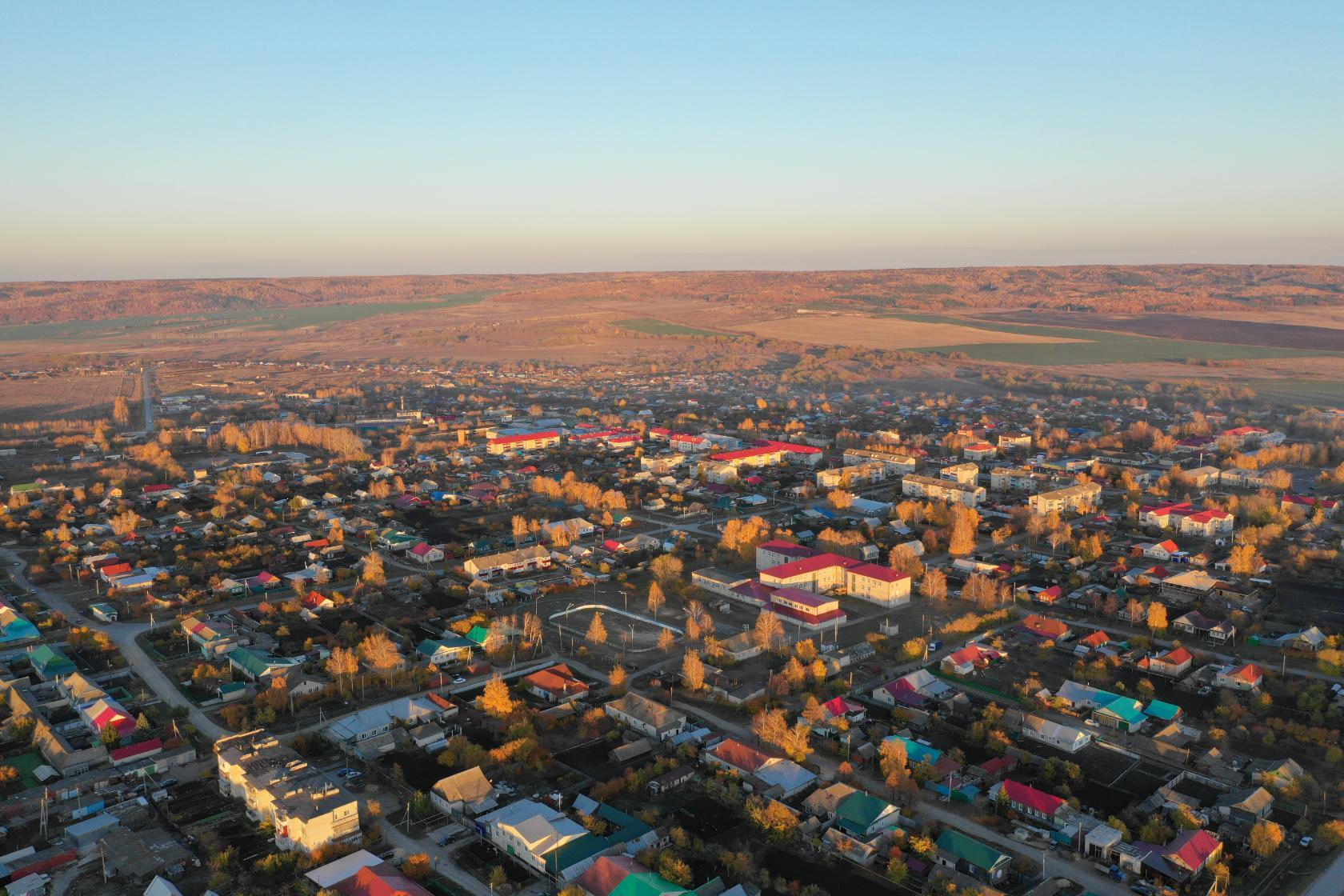
- View of Karsun

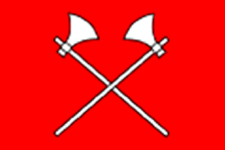
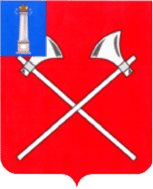
- Flag Coat of arms
- Interactive map of Karsun
- Location of Karsun Karsun (Ulyanovsk Oblast)
- Coordinates: 54.1969°N 46.9795°E
- Country: Russia
- Federal subject: Ulyanovsk Oblast
- Administrative district: Karsunsky District
- Founded: 1647
- Elevation: 131 m (430 ft)

Population (2010 Census)
  - Total: 7,748
  - Estimate (2021): 7,137 (−7.9%)
- Time zone: UTC+4 (UTC+04:00)
- Postal code: 433210
- OKTMO ID: 73614151051

Karsun (Russian: Карсу́н) is an urban locality (an urban-type settlement) in Karsunsky District of Ulyanovsk Oblast, Russia. Population: 7,748 (2010 census); 8,200 (2002 census); 7,936 (1989 Soviet census).
