= Sursky District =

Sursky District Сурский район (Russian)
- District
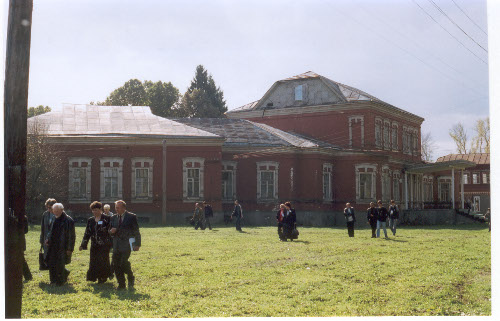
- An estate in the selo of Lava in Sursky District, a cultural heritage object

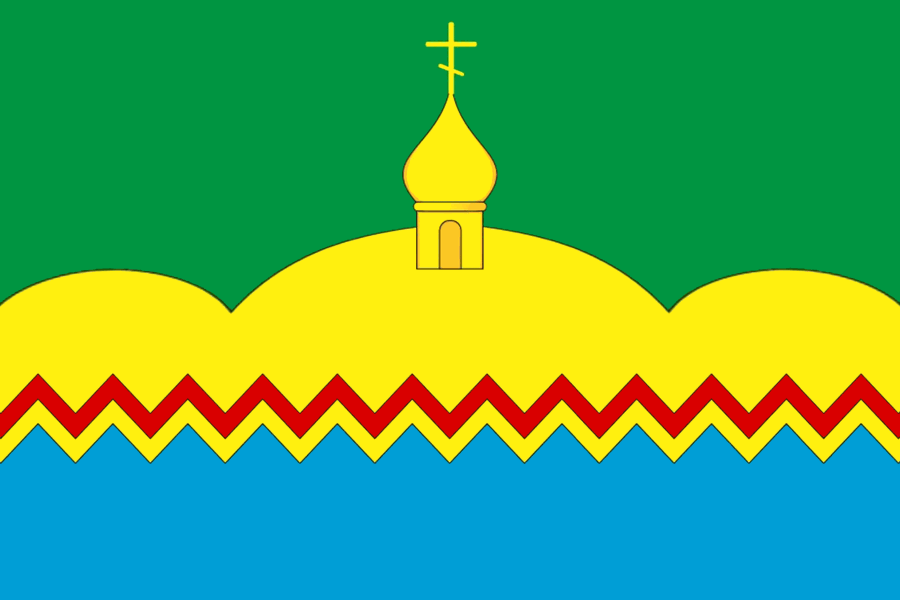
- Flag Coat of arms
- Location of Sursky District in Ulyanovsk Oblast
- Coordinates: 54°28′51″N 46°43′07″E
- Country: Russia
- Federal subject: Ulyanovsk Oblast
- Administrative center: Surskoye

Area
  - Total: 1,688 km^{2} (652 sq mi)

Population (2010 Census)
  - Total: 19,430
  - Density: 11.51/km^{2} (29.81/sq mi)
  - Urban: 35.3%
  - Rural: 64.7%

Administrative structure
  - Administrative divisions: 1 Settlement okrugs, 6 Rural okrugs
  - Inhabited localities: 1 urban-type settlements, 61 rural localities

Municipal structure
  - Municipally incorporated as: Sursky Municipal District
  - Municipal divisions: 1 urban settlements, 6 rural settlements
- Time zone: UTC+4 (UTC+04:00)
- OKTMO ID: 73644000
- Website: https://surskoe.ulregion.ru/

Sursky District (Russian: Су́рский райо́н) is an administrative and municipal district (raion), one of the twenty-one in Ulyanovsk Oblast, Russia. It is located in the northwest of the oblast. The area of the district is 1,688 square kilometers (652 sq mi). Its administrative center is the urban locality (a work settlement) of Surskoye. Population: 19,430 (2010 Census); 22,644 (2002 census); 25,932 (1989 Soviet census). The population of Surskoye accounts for 35.3% of the district's total population.
