= Izmaylovo, Ulyanovsk Oblast =

Izmaylovo Измайлово
- Urban-type settlement
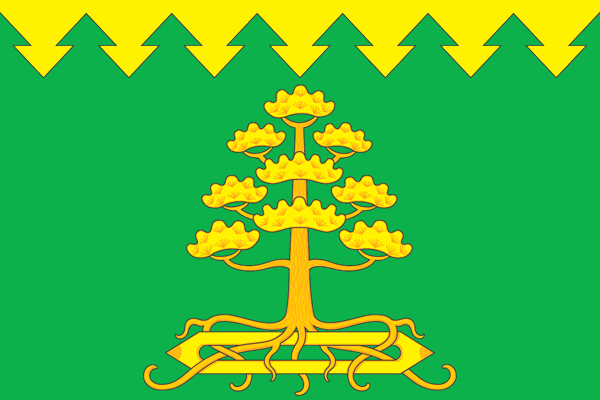
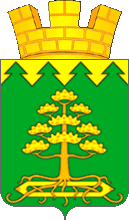
- Flag Coat of arms
- Interactive map of Izmaylovo
- Location of Izmaylovo Izmaylovo (Ulyanovsk Oblast)
- Coordinates: 53.7213°N 47.2462°E
- Country: Russia
- Federal subject: Ulyanovsk Oblast
- Administrative district: Baryshsky District
- Elevation: 208 m (682 ft)

Population (2010 Census)
  - Total: 2,494
  - Estimate (2021): 2,021 (−19%)
- Time zone: UTC+4 (UTC+04:00)
- Postal code: 433721
- OKTMO ID: 73604154051

Izmaylovo (Russian: Измайлово) is an urban locality (an urban-type settlement) in Baryshsky District of Ulyanovsk Oblast, Russia. The population was 2,494 (2010 census); 3,102 (2002 census); 3,943 (1989 Soviet census).
