= Glotovka =

Glotovka Глотовка
- Urban-type settlement
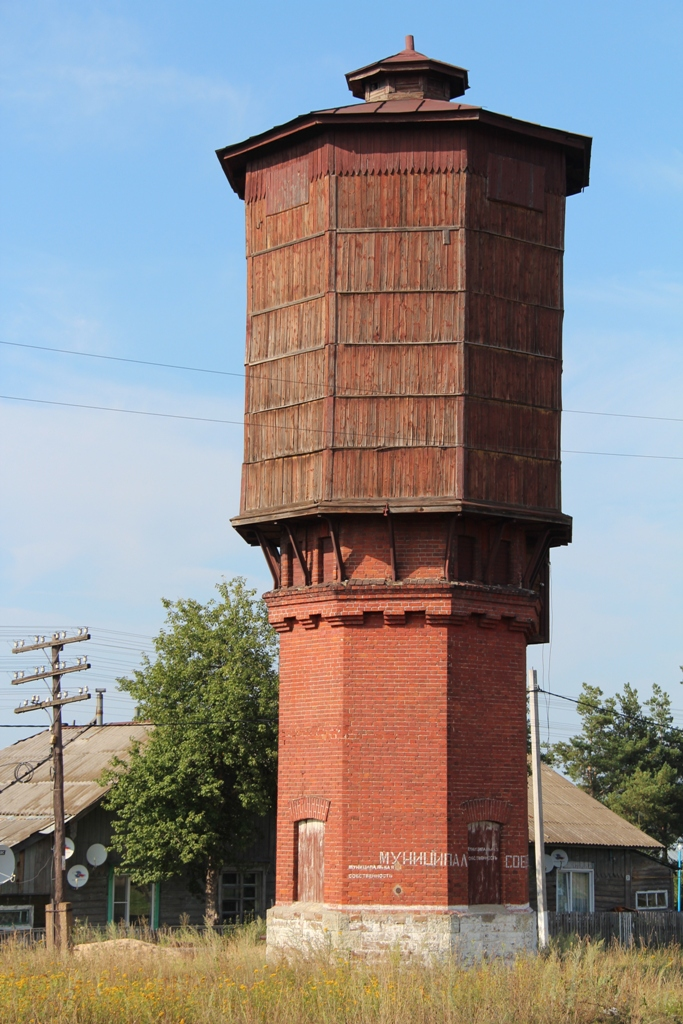

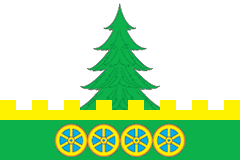
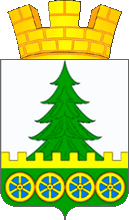
- Flag Coat of arms
- Interactive map of Glotovka
- Location of Glotovka Glotovka (Ulyanovsk Oblast)
- Coordinates: 53.9499°N 46.7011°E
- Country: Russia
- Federal subject: Ulyanovsk Oblast
- Administrative district: Inzensky District
- Founded: 1899
- Elevation: 296 m (971 ft)

Population (2010 Census)
  - Total: 2,428
  - Estimate (2021): 1,837 (−24.3%)
- Time zone: UTC+4 (UTC+04:00)
- Postal code: 433040
- OKTMO ID: 73610158051

Glotovka (Russian: Глотовка) is an urban locality (an urban-type settlement) in Inzensky District of Ulyanovsk Oblast, Russia. Population: 2,428 (2010 census); 3,066 (2002 census); 3,504 (1989 Soviet census).
