= Murder of Maina Sunuwar =

2004 death of a 15-year-old in Nepal

Maina Sunuwar Murder Case of Nepal
- Date: February 2004
- Location: Panchkhal, Kavrepalanchok, Nepal
- Deaths: 1 (victim)
- Charges: Human rights violation, murder
- Convictions: Amit Pun; Sunil Adhikari; Boby Khatri

The Maina Sunuwar murder case concerns the murder of Maina Sunuwar, a 15-year-old girl killed by the Nepalese Army in February 2004 during the Nepalese Civil War, at Birendra Peace Operations Training Center, Panchkhal, Kavrepalanchok, Nepal.

== Incident ==
According to a report by the Office of the High Commissioner of Human Rights in Nepal, on 17 February 2004, Nepalese Army officers arrested and took Sunuwar from her home in Kharelthok, Kavrepalanchowk District, to the Birendra Peace Operations Training Centre in Panchkhal. The army had gone to the village acting on information provided by Maoist cadre Bimala BK, who had been arrested by police in the Palanchok area, and told the army in the course of the interrogation that Debi Sunuwar and her daughter Maina Sunuwar were in contact with the Maoist party. At the Training Centre, she was brutally tortured in the presence of seven officers and soldiers, including two captains. Under the orders of the then Lt. Col. Babi Khatri, her head was repeatedly submerged in a large pot of water.

The soldiers then gave electric shocks to her wet hands and feet, repeated four or five times. The torture continued for 90 minutes, after which she was detained in a building on the premises of the Training Center. There she was left blindfolded and handcuffed; she later began vomiting and foaming at the mouth and died before medical assistance arrived.

The officers and soldiers involved attempted to cover up her death. Her body was shot in the back and buried inside the Training Center. The colonel in charge then fabricated a report stating that Sunuwar had been shot while trying to escape military custody.

In September 2005, after intense public and international pressure, three officers were brought before a court martial and sentenced to six months' imprisonment for failing to follow proper procedures when disposing of Maina Sunuwar's body.

In April 2017, a court sentenced three more soldiers to 20 years in jail for the killing. Human rights groups fear the three soldiers may not serve their sentences.
