= Yazykovo, Karsunsky District, Ulyanovsk Oblast =

Yazykovo Языково
- Urban-type settlement
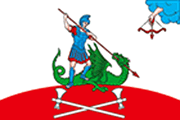
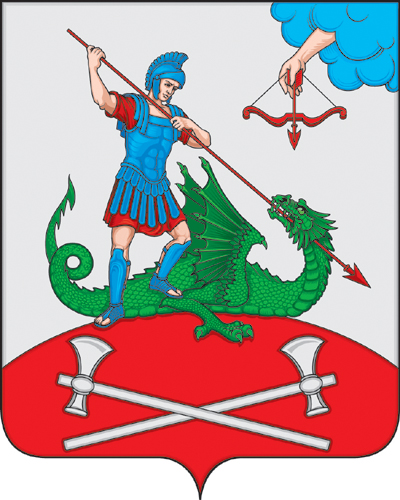
- Flag Coat of arms
- Interactive map of Yazykovo
- Location of Yazykovo Yazykovo (Ulyanovsk Oblast)
- Coordinates: 54.2957°N 47.3868°E
- Country: Russia
- Federal subject: Ulyanovsk Oblast
- Administrative district: Karsunsky District
- Founded: 1670

Population (2010 Census)
  - Total: 4,217
  - Estimate (2021): 3,276 (−22.3%)
- Time zone: UTC+4 (UTC+04:00)
- Postal code: 433201
- OKTMO ID: 73614158051

Yazykovo (Russian: Языково) is an urban locality (an urban-type settlement) in Karsunsky District of Ulyanovsk Oblast, Russia. Population: 4,217 (2010 census); 4,961 (2002 census); 5,436 (1989 Soviet census).
