= Cherdakly =

Cherdakly Чердаклы
- Urban-type settlement
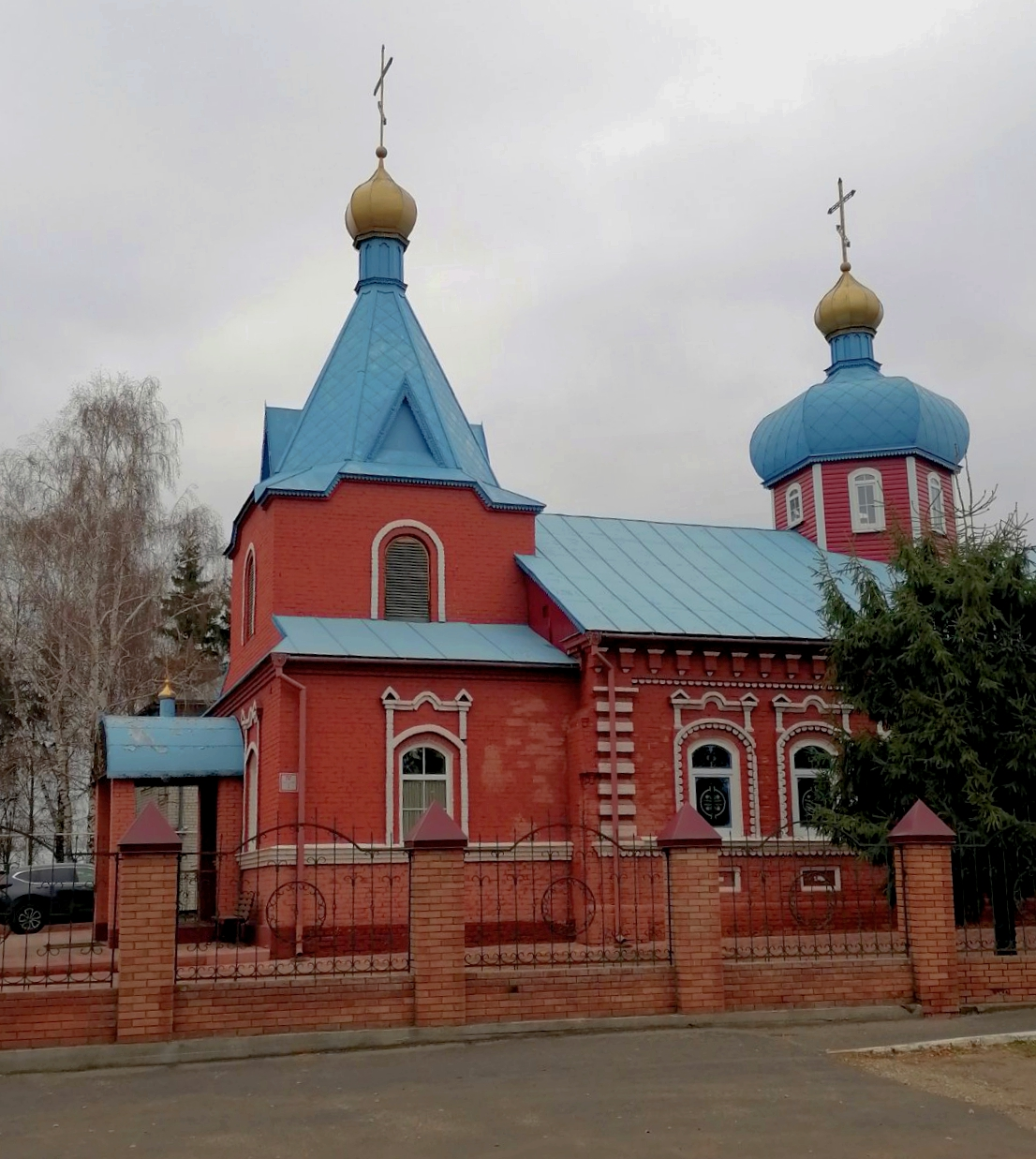

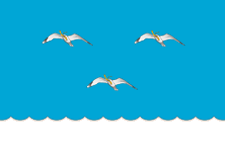
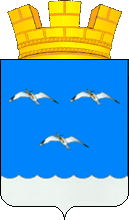
- Flag Coat of arms
- Interactive map of Cherdakly
- Location of Cherdakly Cherdakly (Ulyanovsk Oblast)
- Coordinates: 54.3591°N 48.8487°E
- Country: Russia
- Federal subject: Ulyanovsk Oblast
- Administrative district: Cherdaklinsky District
- Founded: 1688
- Elevation: 91 m (299 ft)

Population (2010 Census)
  - Total: 11,440
  - Estimate (2021): 12,084 (+5.6%)
- Time zone: UTC+4 (UTC+04:00)
- Postal code: 433400
- OKTMO ID: 73656151051

Cherdakly (Russian: Чердаклы) is an urban locality (an urban-type settlement) in Cherdaklinsky District of Ulyanovsk Oblast, Russia. Population: 11,440 (2010 census); 12,045 (2002 census); 11,091 (1989 Soviet census).
