= Terenga =

Terenga Тереньга
- Urban-type settlement
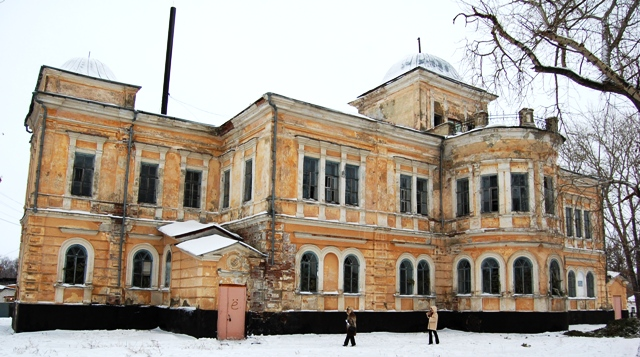
- Manor in Terenga

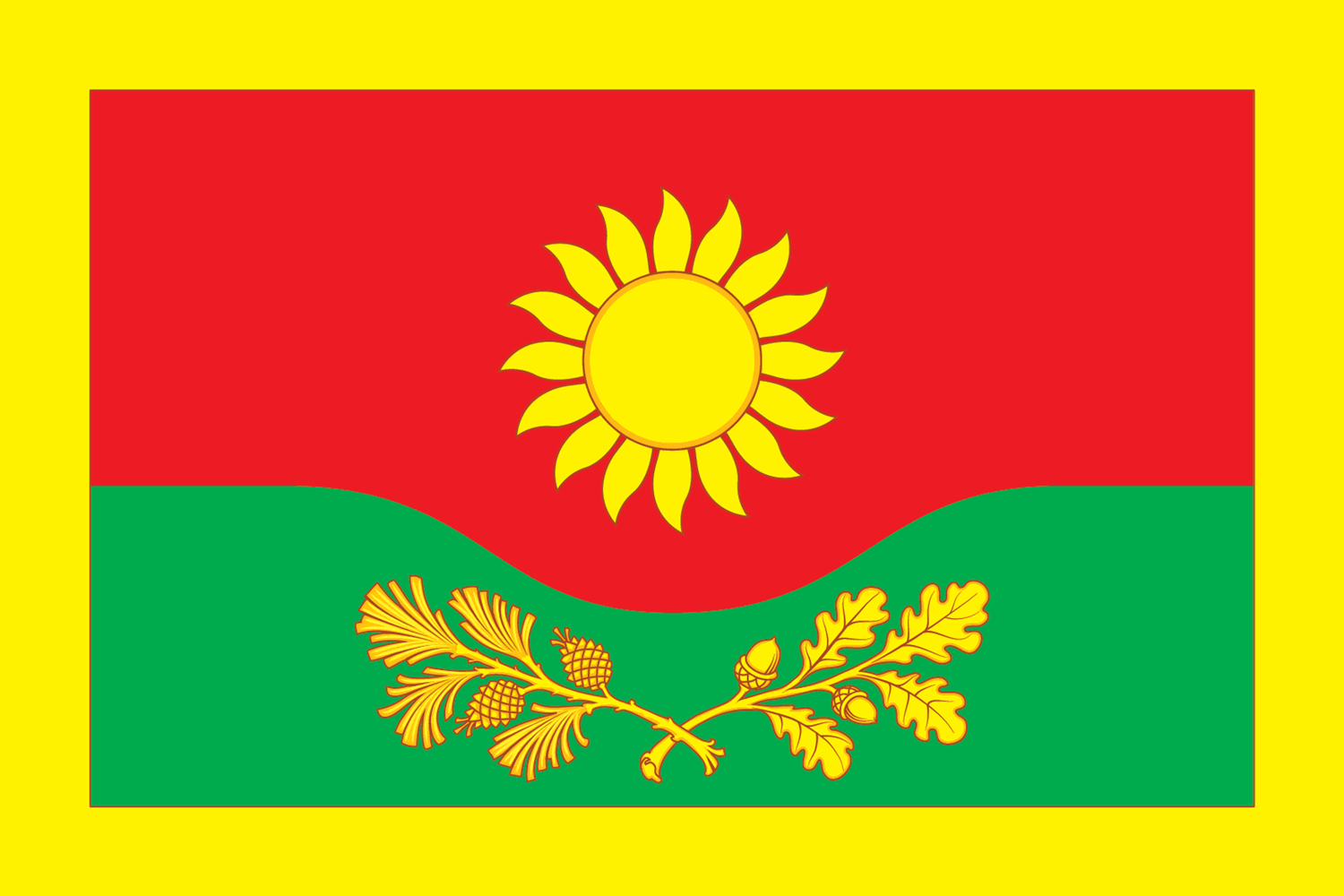
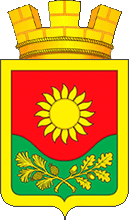
- Flag Coat of arms
- Interactive map of Terenga
- Location of Terenga Terenga (Ulyanovsk Oblast)
- Coordinates: 53.7160°N 48.3673°E
- Country: Russia
- Federal subject: Ulyanovsk Oblast
- Administrative district: Terengulsky District
- Founded: 1682
- Elevation: 200 m (660 ft)

Population (2010 Census)
  - Total: 5,330
  - Estimate (2021): 5,186 (−2.7%)
- Time zone: UTC+4 (UTC+04:00)
- Postal code: 433360
- OKTMO ID: 73648151051

Terenga (Russian: Тереньга) is an urban locality (an urban-type settlement) in Terengulsky District of Ulyanovsk Oblast, Russia. Population: 5,330 (2010 census); 5,509 (2002 census); 5,941 (1989 Soviet census).
