= Tsemzavod =

Tsemzavod Цемзавод
- Urban-type settlement
- Interactive map of Tsemzavod
- Location of Tsemzavod Tsemzavod (Ulyanovsk Oblast)
- Coordinates: 54.0029°N 48.7284°E
- Country: Russia
- Federal subject: Ulyanovsk Oblast
- Administrative district: Sengileyevsky District

Population (2010 Census)
  - Total: 1,156
  - Estimate (2021): 787 (−31.9%)
- Time zone: UTC+4 (UTC+04:00)
- Postal code: 433381
- OKTMO ID: 73636101056

Tsemzavod (Russian: Цемзавод) is an urban locality (an urban-type settlement) in Sengileyevsky District of Ulyanovsk Oblast, Russia. Population: 1,156 (2010 census); 1,285 (2002 census);
