= Novaya Mayna =

Novaya Mayna Новая Майна
- Urban-type settlement
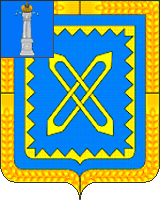
- Flag Coat of arms
- Interactive map of Novaya Mayna
- Location of Novaya Mayna Novaya Mayna (Ulyanovsk Oblast)
- Coordinates: 54.1488°N 49.7659°E
- Country: Russia
- Federal subject: Ulyanovsk Oblast
- Administrative district: Melekessky District

Population (2010 Census)
  - Total: 5,948
  - Estimate (2021): 5,059 (−14.9%)
- Time zone: UTC+4 (UTC+04:00)
- Postal code: 433555
- OKTMO ID: 73622160051

Novaya Mayna (Russian: Новая Майна) is an urban locality (an urban-type settlement) in Melekessky District of Ulyanovsk Oblast, Russia. Population: 5,948 (2010 census); 6,505 (2002 census); 5,662 (1989 Soviet census).
