= Sengiley =

Sengiley Сенгилей
- Town
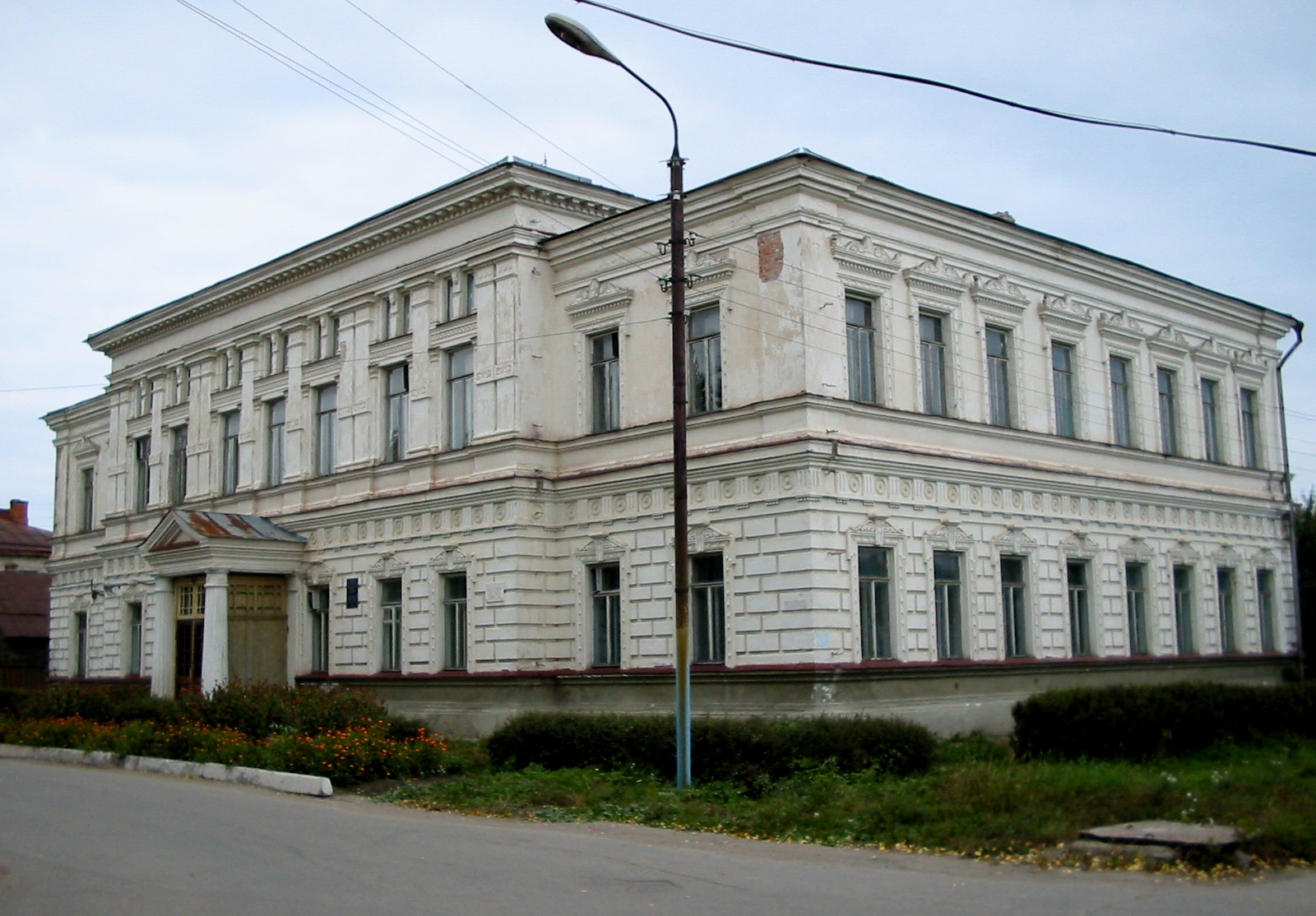

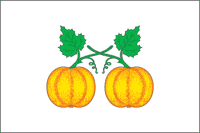
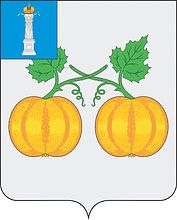
- Flag Coat of arms
- Interactive map of Sengiley
- Location of Sengiley Sengiley (Ulyanovsk Oblast)
- Coordinates: 53°58′N 48°48′E
- Country: Russia
- Federal subject: Ulyanovsk Oblast
- Administrative district: Sengileyevsky District
- Town of district significanceSelsoviet: Sengiley
- Founded: 1666
- Town status since: 1943
- Elevation: 70 m (230 ft)

Population (2010 Census)
  - Total: 6,958
  - Estimate (2021): 6,407 (−7.9%)

Administrative status
  - Capital of: town of district significance of Sengiley

Municipal status
  - Municipal district: Sengileyevsky Municipal District
  - Urban settlement: Sengileyevskoye Urban Settlement
  - Capital of: Sengileyevsky Municipal District, Sengileyevskoye Urban Settlement
- Time zone: UTC+4 (UTC+04:00)
- Postal codes: 433380, 433381, 433399
- OKTMO ID: 73636101001

Sengiley (Russian: Сенгиле́й) is a town and the administrative center of Sengileyevsky District in Ulyanovsk Oblast, Russia, located on the right bank of Kuybyshev Reservoir, 72 kilometers (45 mi) south of Ulyanovsk, the administrative center of the oblast. Population: 6,958 (2010 census); 8,396 (2002 census); 10,366 (1989 Soviet census).

== History ==
It was founded in 1666 as a defensive military outpost against nomadic raids. Several slobodas later formed around the outpost and in the beginning of the 18th century the slobodas of Stanichnaya, Butyrskaya, and Vybornaya merged into the village of Pokrovskoye (Покро́вское), named for a Church of the Intercession. In 1780, it was chartered as the town of Sengiley; named for its position on the river then of the same name (now the Sengileyka, a tributary of the Volga), which comes from Erzya words syang, meaning tributary and lei, meaning river.

In 1925, Sengiley was demoted in status to that of a rural locality, but was granted urban-type settlement status later that year. Town status was granted to it again in 1943.

== Culture ==
There is a local museum. It has exhibits in various areas including fine arts and local history.

== Administrative and municipal status ==
Within the framework of administrative divisions, Sengiley serves as the administrative center of Sengileyevsky District. As an administrative division, it is, together with the work settlement of Tsemzavod, incorporated within Sengileyevsky District as the town of district significance of Sengiley. As a municipal division, the town of district significance of Sengiley is incorporated within Sengileyevsky Municipal District as Sengileyevskoye Urban Settlement.
