= Yazykovo, Blagoveshchensky District, Republic of Bashkortostan =

Yazykovo Языково
- Village
- Location within Bashkortostan Location within Russia
- Coordinates: 55°13′N 56°08′E
- Country: Russia
- Region: Bashkortostan
- District: Blagoveshchensky District
- Time zone: UTC+5:00

Yazykovo (Russian: Языково) is a rural locality (a village) in Novonadezhdinsky Selsoviet, Blagoveshchensky District, Bashkortostan, Russia. The population was 195 as of 2010. There are 2 streets.

== Geography ==
Yazykovo is located 120 km southwest of Blagoveshchensk (the district's administrative centre) by road. Kob-Pokrovka is the nearest rural locality.
