= Terengulsky District =

Terengulsky District Тереньгульский район (Russian)
- District
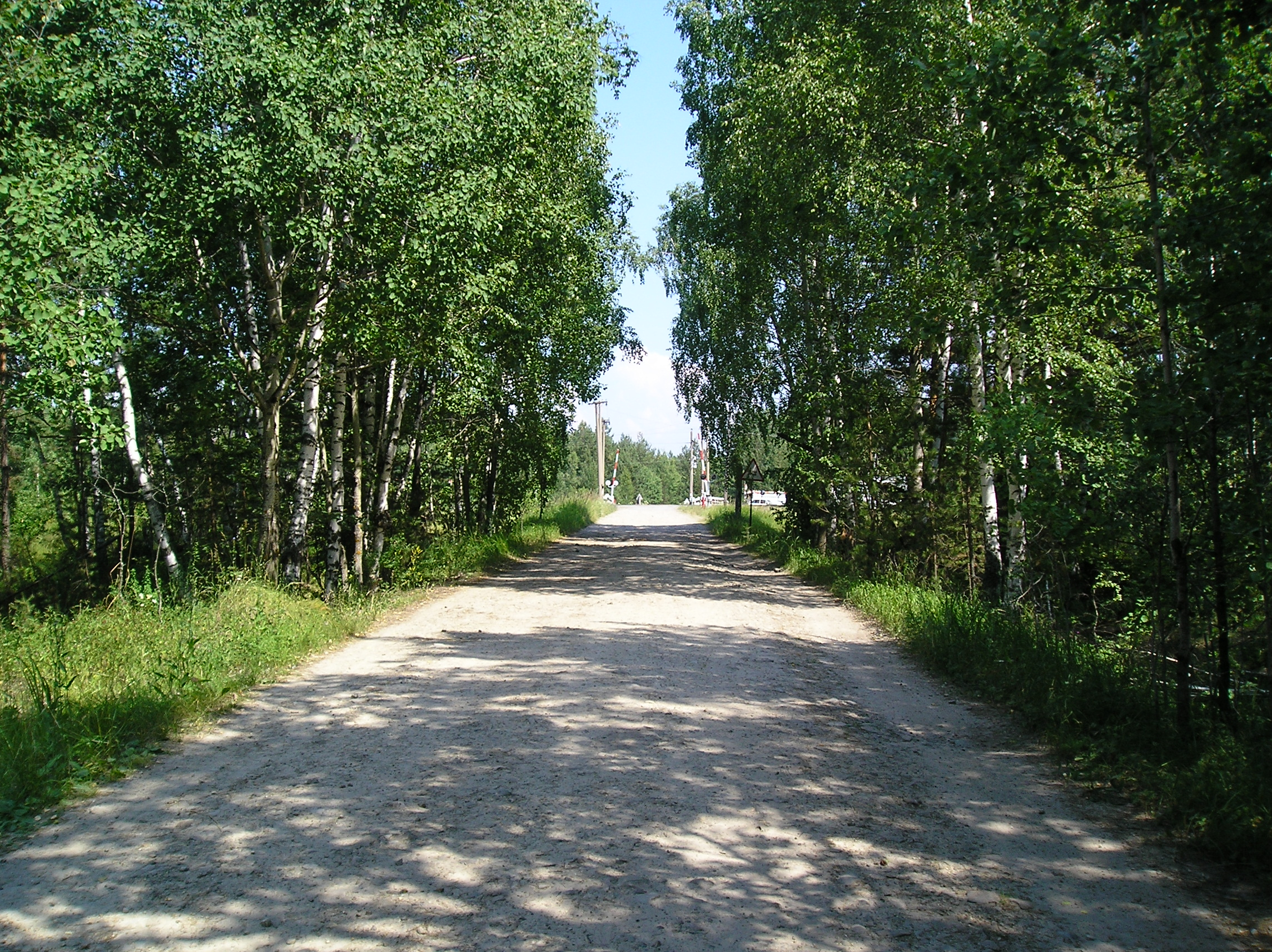
- Landscape in Terengulsky District

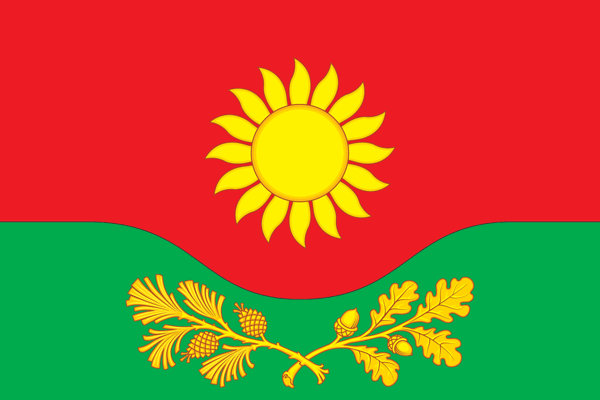
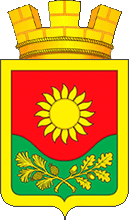
- Flag Coat of arms
- Location of Terengulsky District in Ulyanovsk Oblast
- Coordinates: 53°43′02″N 48°22′02″E
- Country: Russia
- Federal subject: Ulyanovsk Oblast
- Administrative center: Terenga

Area
  - Total: 1,756.3 km^{2} (678.1 sq mi)

Population (2010 Census)
  - Total: 18,761
  - Density: 10.682/km^{2} (27.667/sq mi)
  - Urban: 28.4%
  - Rural: 71.6%

Administrative structure
  - Administrative divisions: 1 Settlement okrugs, 5 Rural okrugs
  - Inhabited localities: 1 urban-type settlements, 43 rural localities

Municipal structure
  - Municipally incorporated as: Terengulsky Municipal District
  - Municipal divisions: 1 urban settlements, 5 rural settlements
- Time zone: UTC+4 (UTC+04:00)
- OKTMO ID: 73648000
- Website: http://www.terenga.ru/

Terengulsky District (Russian: Тереньгу́льский райо́н) is an administrative and municipal district (raion), one of the twenty-one in Ulyanovsk Oblast, Russia. It is located in the center of the oblast. The area of the district is 1,756.3 square kilometers (678.1 sq mi) Its administrative center is the urban locality (a work settlement) of Terenga. Population: 18,761 (2010 Census); 20,617 (2002 census); 22,551 (1989 Soviet census). The population of Terenga accounts for 28.4% of the district's total population.
