= Mayna, Ulyanovsk Oblast =

Mayna Майна
- Urban-type settlement
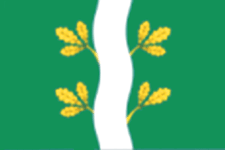
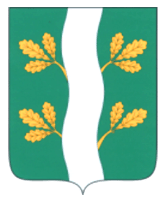
- Flag Coat of arms
- Interactive map of Mayna
- Location of Mayna Mayna (Ulyanovsk Oblast)
- Coordinates: 54.1127°N 47.6233°E
- Country: Russia
- Federal subject: Ulyanovsk Oblast
- Administrative district: Maynsky District
- Founded: 1898

Population (2010 Census)
  - Total: 7,109
  - Estimate (2021): 6,666 (−6.2%)
- Time zone: UTC+4 (UTC+04:00)
- Postal code: 433130
- OKTMO ID: 73620151051

Mayna (Russian: Майна) is an urban locality (an urban-type settlement) in Maynsky District of Ulyanovsk Oblast, Russia. Population: 7,109 (2010 census); 7,974 (2002 census); 8,216 (1989 Soviet census).
