= Melekessky District =

Melekessky District Мелекесский район (Russian)
- District
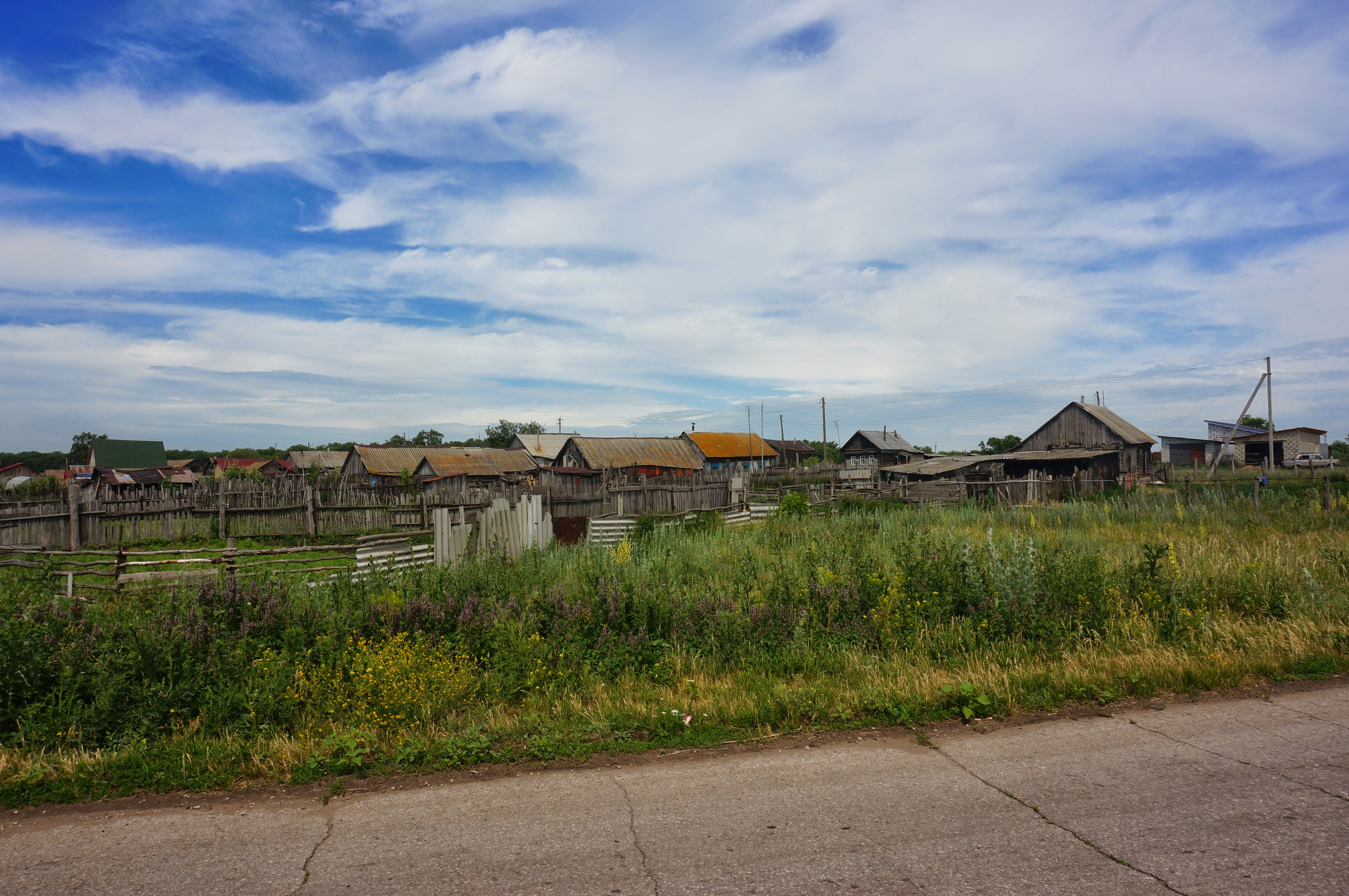
- Dubravka village, Melekessky District

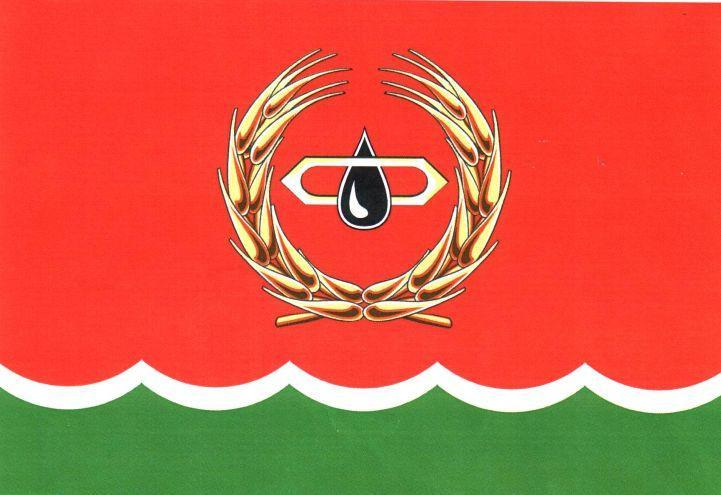
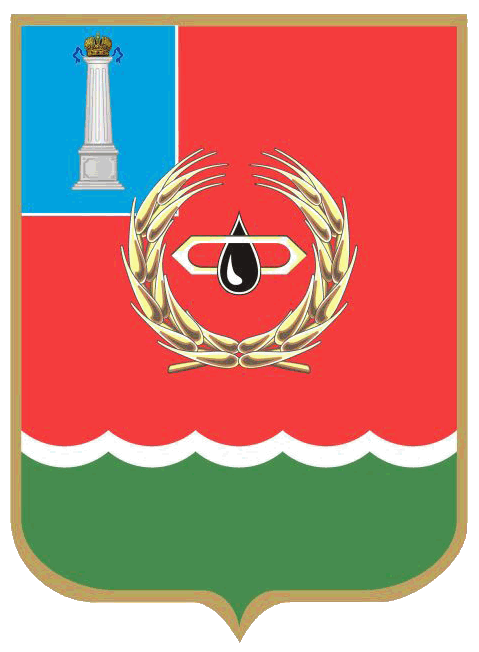
- Flag Coat of arms
- Location of Melekessky District in Ulyanovsk Oblast
- Coordinates: 54°14′N 49°35′E
- Country: Russia
- Federal subject: Ulyanovsk Oblast
- Established: 16 July 1928
- Administrative center: Dimitrovgrad

Area
  - Total: 3,472.3 km^{2} (1,340.7 sq mi)

Population (2010 Census)
  - Total: 36,718
  - Density: 10.575/km^{2} (27.388/sq mi)
  - Urban: 33.0%
  - Rural: 67.0%

Administrative structure
  - Administrative divisions: 2 Settlement okrugs, 6 Rural okrugs
  - Inhabited localities: 2 urban-type settlements, 53 rural localities

Municipal structure
  - Municipally incorporated as: Melekessky Municipal District
  - Municipal divisions: 2 urban settlements, 6 rural settlements
- Time zone: UTC+4 (UTC+04:00)
- OKTMO ID: 73622000
- Website: http://adm-melekess.ru/

Melekessky District (Russian: Мелеке́сский райо́н) is an administrative and municipal district (raion), one of the twenty-one in Ulyanovsk Oblast, Russia. It is located in the northeast of the oblast. The area of the district is 3,472.3 square kilometers (1,340.7 sq mi). Its administrative center is the city of Dimitrovgrad (which is not administratively a part of the district). Population: 36,718 (2010 Census); 40,272 (2002 census); 42,023 (1989 Soviet census).

== Administrative and municipal status ==
Within the framework of administrative divisions, Melekessky District is one of the twenty-one in the oblast. The city of Dimitrovgrad serves as its administrative center, despite being incorporated separately as a city of oblast significance—an administrative unit with the status equal to that of the districts.

As a municipal division, the district is incorporated as Melekessky Municipal District. The city of oblast significance of Dimitrovgrad is incorporated separately from the district as Dimitrovgrad Urban Okrug.
