= Veshkaymsky District =

Veshkaymsky District Вешкаймский район (Russian)
- District
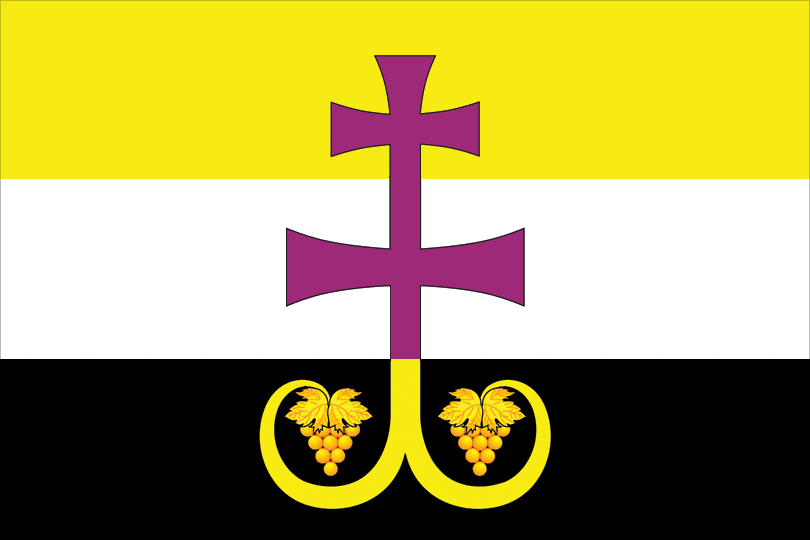
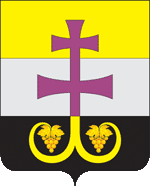
- Flag Coat of arms
- Location of Veshkaymsky District in Ulyanovsk Oblast
- Coordinates: 54°03′N 47°08′E
- Country: Russia
- Federal subject: Ulyanovsk Oblast
- Established: 25 January 1935
- Administrative center: Veshkayma

Area
  - Total: 1,435.5 km^{2} (554.2 sq mi)

Population (2010 Census)
  - Total: 19,801
  - Density: 13.794/km^{2} (35.726/sq mi)
  - Urban: 44.7%
  - Rural: 55.3%

Administrative structure
  - Administrative divisions: 2 Settlement okrugs, 4 Rural okrugs
  - Inhabited localities: 2 urban-type settlements, 34 rural localities

Municipal structure
  - Municipally incorporated as: Veshkaymsky Municipal District
  - Municipal divisions: 2 urban settlements, 4 rural settlements
- Time zone: UTC+4 (UTC+04:00)
- OKTMO ID: 73607000
- Website: https://veshkajma-r73.gosweb.gosuslugi.ru/

Veshkaymsky District (Russian: Вешка́ймский райо́н) is an administrative and municipal district (raion), one of the twenty-one in Ulyanovsk Oblast, Russia. It is located in the western central part of the oblast. The area of the district is 1,435.5 square kilometers (554.2 sq mi). Its administrative center is the urban locality (a work settlement) of Veshkayma. Population: 19,801 (2010 Census); 23,355 (2002 Census); 25,802 (1989 Soviet census). The population of the administrative center accounts for 33.4% of the district's total population.
