= Maynsky District =

Maynsky District Майнский район (Russian)
- District
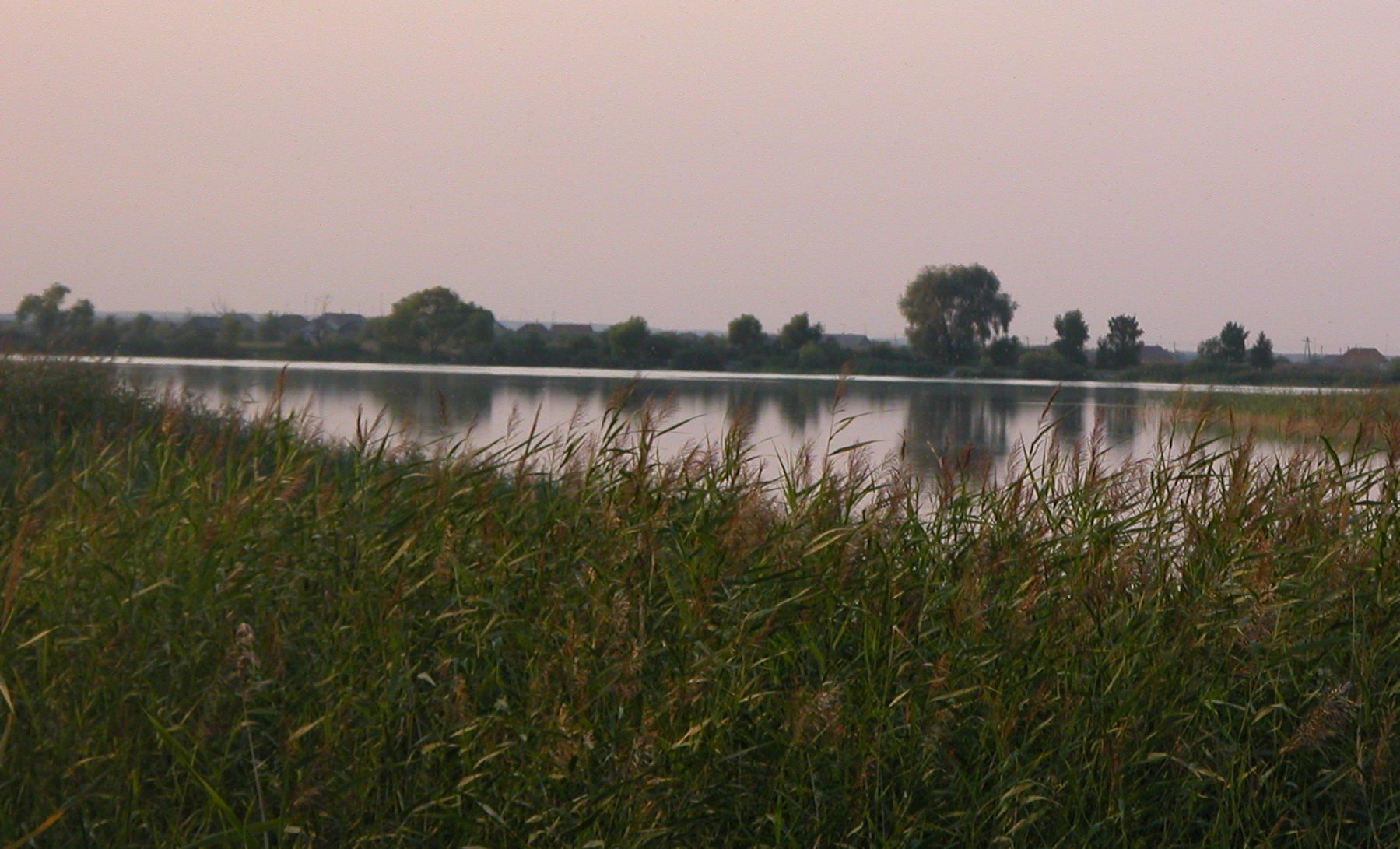
- White Lake, Maynsky District

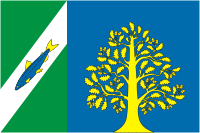
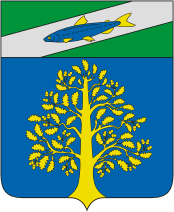
- Flag Coat of arms
- Location of Maynsky District in Ulyanovsk Oblast
- Coordinates: 54°06′49″N 47°36′41″E
- Country: Russia
- Federal subject: Ulyanovsk Oblast
- Established: 3 August 1930
- Administrative center: Mayna

Area
  - Total: 2,306 km^{2} (890 sq mi)

Population (2010 Census)
  - Total: 25,826
  - Density: 11.20/km^{2} (29.01/sq mi)
  - Urban: 36.4%
  - Rural: 63.6%

Administrative structure
  - Administrative divisions: 2 Settlement okrugs, 5 Rural okrugs
  - Inhabited localities: 2 urban-type settlements, 62 rural localities

Municipal structure
  - Municipally incorporated as: Maynsky Municipal District
  - Municipal divisions: 2 urban settlements, 5 rural settlements
- Time zone: UTC+4 (UTC+04:00)
- OKTMO ID: 73620000
- Website: http://maina-admin.ru/

Maynsky District (Russian: Ма́йнский райо́н) is an administrative and municipal district (raion), one of the twenty-one in Ulyanovsk Oblast, Russia. It is located in the central and northern parts of the oblast. The area of the district is 2,306 square kilometers (890 sq mi). Its administrative center is the urban locality (a work settlement) of Mayna. Population: 25,826 (2010 Census); 30,626 (2002 census); 32,642 (1989 Soviet census). The population of Mayna accounts for 27.5% of the district's total population.
