= Veshkayma (urban locality) =

Veshkayma Вешкайма
- Urban-type settlement
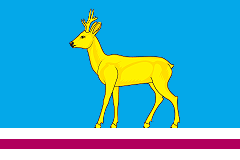
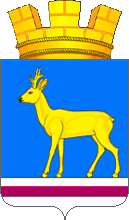
- Flag Coat of arms
- Interactive map of Veshkayma
- Location of Veshkayma Veshkayma (Ulyanovsk Oblast)
- Coordinates: 54.0499°N 47.1251°E
- Country: Russia
- Federal subject: Ulyanovsk Oblast
- Administrative district: Veshkaymsky District
- Founded: 1898
- Elevation: 284 m (932 ft)

Population (2010 Census)
  - Total: 6,619
  - Estimate (2021): 5,783 (−12.6%)
- Time zone: UTC+4 (UTC+04:00)
- Postal code: 433100
- OKTMO ID: 73607151051

Veshkayma (Russian: Вешка́йма) is an urban locality (an urban-type settlement) in Veshkaymsky District of Ulyanovsk Oblast, Russia. Population: 6,619 (2010 census); 7,150 (2002 census); 7,781 (1989 Soviet census).

== History ==
The village of Veshkaima, as the Veshkaima railway station on the Inza-Simbirsk branch of the Moscow-Kazan railway, appeared in 1898. It was named after the river or the village of the same name about seven kilometers to the northwest. The original village was established in the second half of the 17th century as a fortified settlement along the Karsun-Simbirsk fortification line.

Until the beginning of the 20th century, there were no more than 20 people who served the station.

In 1913, 20 people lived in 4 courtyards at the Veshkayma station.

Veshkayma revived when timber, and later agricultural products, were transported through the station. This became especially noticeable during the Civil War.

In 1921, a first-stage school was opened in a new building, built at the expense of railway workers

In 2022, resident Ruslan Akhtymov committed a mass shooting at a kindergarten in the town. Three people were killed.
