= Tsilna =

Tsilna Цильна
- Urban-type settlement
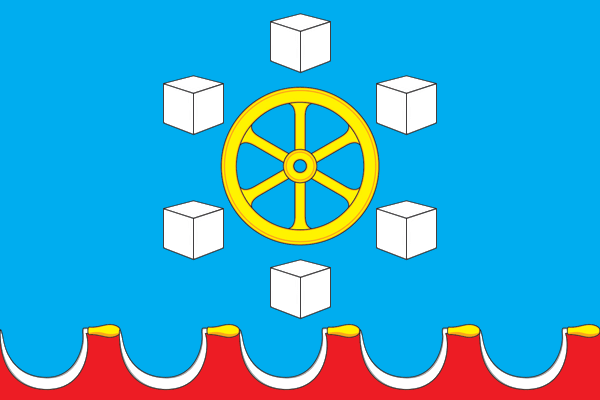
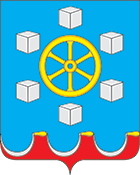
- Flag Coat of arms
- Interactive map of Tsilna
- Location of Tsilna Tsilna (Ulyanovsk Oblast)
- Coordinates: 54.5922°N 48.1411°E
- Country: Russia
- Federal subject: Ulyanovsk Oblast
- Administrative district: Tsilninsky District
- Founded: 1940
- Elevation: 105 m (344 ft)

Population (2010 Census)
  - Total: 4,119
  - Estimate (2021): 3,876 (−5.9%)
- Time zone: UTC+4 (UTC+04:00)
- Postal code: 433600
- OKTMO ID: 73654154051

Tsilna (Russian: Цильна) is an urban locality (an urban-type settlement) in Tsilninsky District of Ulyanovsk Oblast, Russia. Population: 4,119 (2010 census); 4,165 (2002 census); 4,720 (1989 Soviet census).
