= Karsunsky District =

Karsunsky District Карсунский район (Russian)
- District
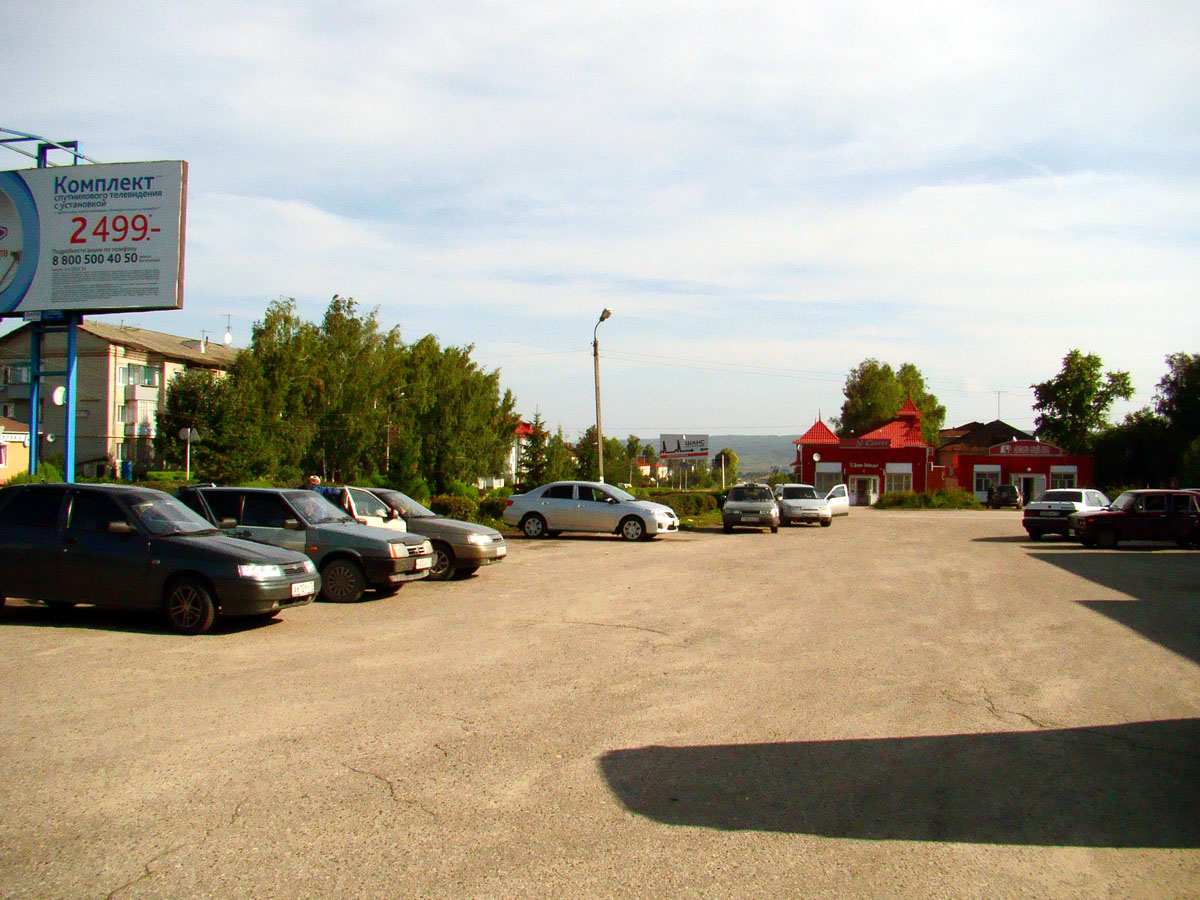
- Karsun town, Karsunsky District

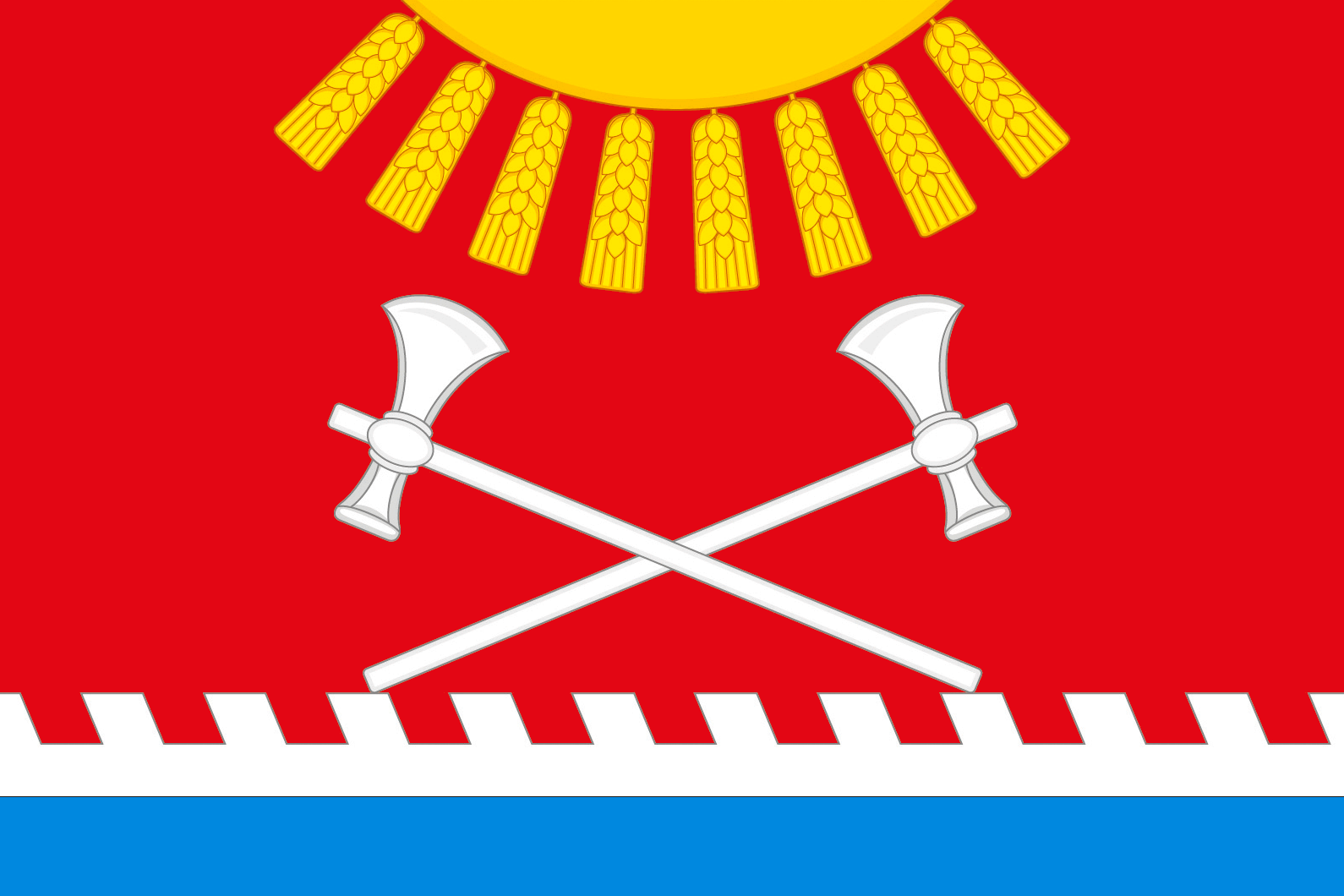
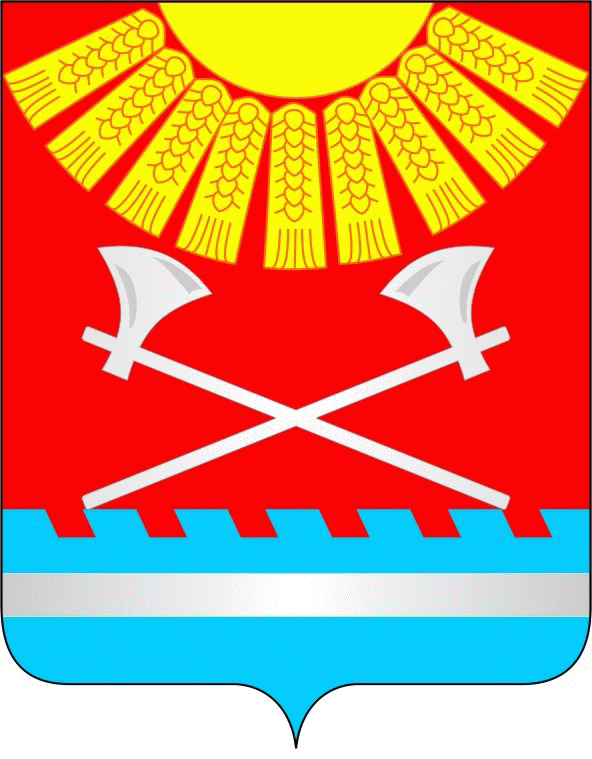
- Flag Coat of arms
- Location of Karsunsky District in Ulyanovsk Oblast
- Coordinates: 54°11′50″N 46°59′06″E
- Country: Russia
- Federal subject: Ulyanovsk Oblast
- Established: 1928
- Administrative center: Karsun

Area
  - Total: 1,768.6 km^{2} (682.9 sq mi)

Population (2010 Census)
  - Total: 25,170
  - Density: 14.23/km^{2} (36.86/sq mi)
  - Urban: 47.5%
  - Rural: 52.5%

Administrative structure
  - Administrative divisions: 2 Settlement okrugs, 6 Rural okrugs
  - Inhabited localities: 2 urban-type settlements, 43 rural localities

Municipal structure
  - Municipally incorporated as: Karsunsky Municipal District
  - Municipal divisions: 2 urban settlements, 6 rural settlements
- Time zone: UTC+4 (UTC+04:00)
- OKTMO ID: 73614000
- Website: http://karsunmo.ru/

Karsunsky District (Russian: Карсу́нский райо́н) is an administrative and municipal district (raion), one of the twenty-one in Ulyanovsk Oblast, Russia. It is located in the northwest of the oblast. The area of the district is 1,768.6 square kilometers (682.9 sq mi). Its administrative center is the urban locality (a work settlement) of Karsun. Population: 25,170 (2010 Census); 29,319 (2002 census); 32,561 (1989 Soviet census). The population of Karsun accounts for 30.8% of the district's total population.
