= Surskoye =

Surskoye Сурское
- Urban-type settlement
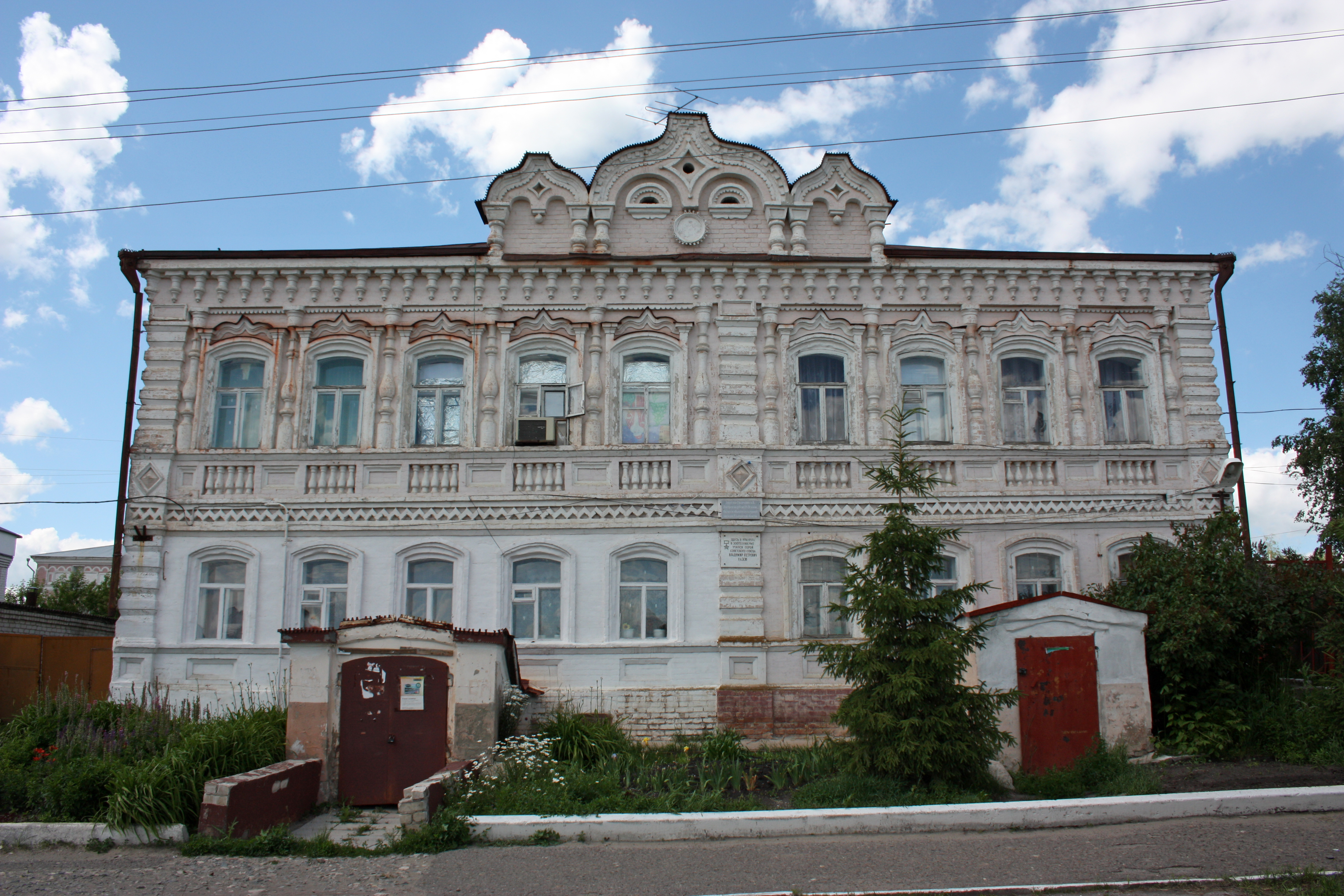

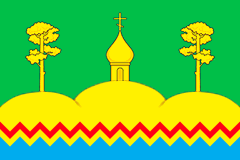
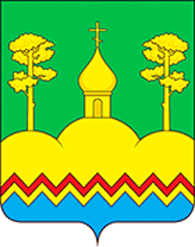
- Flag Coat of arms
- Interactive map of Surskoye
- Location of Surskoye Surskoye (Ulyanovsk Oblast)
- Coordinates: 54.4773°N 46.7091°E
- Country: Russia
- Federal subject: Ulyanovsk Oblast
- Administrative district: Sursky District
- Founded: 1552

Population (2010 Census)
  - Total: 6,852
  - Estimate (2021): 5,805 (−15.3%)
- Time zone: UTC+4 (UTC+04:00)
- Postal code: 433240
- OKTMO ID: 73644151051

Surskoye (Russian: Сурское) is an urban locality (an urban-type settlement) in Sursky District of Ulyanovsk Oblast, Russia. Population: 6,852 (2010 census); 7,389 (2002 census); 7,716 (1989 Soviet census).
