= Barysh =

Barysh Барыш
- Town
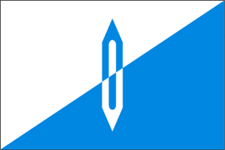
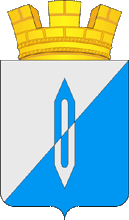
- Flag Coat of arms
- Interactive map of Barysh
- Location of Barysh Barysh (Ulyanovsk Oblast)
- Coordinates: 53°39′N 47°06′E
- Country: Russia
- Federal subject: Ulyanovsk Oblast
- Administrative district: Baryshsky District
- Town of district significanceSelsoviet: Barysh
- Founded: 1954
- Elevation: 200 m (660 ft)

Population (2010 Census)
  - Total: 17,149
  - Estimate (2021): 14,924 (−13%)

Administrative status
  - Capital of: town of district significance of Barysh

Municipal status
  - Municipal district: Baryshsky Municipal District
  - Urban settlement: Baryshskoye Urban Settlement
  - Capital of: Baryshsky Municipal District, Baryshskoye Urban Settlement
- Time zone: UTC+4 (UTC+04:00)
- Postal codes: 433750–433754, 433759
- OKTMO ID: 73604101001
- Website: web.archive.org/web/20150801010802/http://admbarysh.ru/

Barysh (Russian: Бары́ш) is a town and the administrative center of Baryshsky District in Ulyanovsk Oblast, Russia, located on the river Barysh (Volga's basin), 139 kilometers (86 mi) southwest of Ulyanovsk, the administrative center of the oblast. Population: 17,149 (2010 census); 18,902 (2002 census); 20,213 (1989 Soviet census).

== History ==
It was founded in 1954 after the merger of urban-type settlements of Barysh and Guryevka.

== Administrative and municipal status ==
Within the framework of administrative divisions, Barysh serves as the administrative center of Baryshsky District. As an administrative division, it is incorporated within Baryshsky District as the town of district significance of Barysh. As a municipal division, the town of district significance of Barysh is incorporated within Baryshsky Municipal District as Baryshskoye Urban Settlement.

== Economy ==
Baryshsky meat plant, which produces canned meat stew for the Ministry of Defense, Ministry of Internal Affairs, Ministry of Emergency Situations, Federal Security Service, and Federal Protective Service, is located is Barysh.
