= Sengileyevsky District =

Sengileyvsky District Сенгилеевский район (Russian)
- District
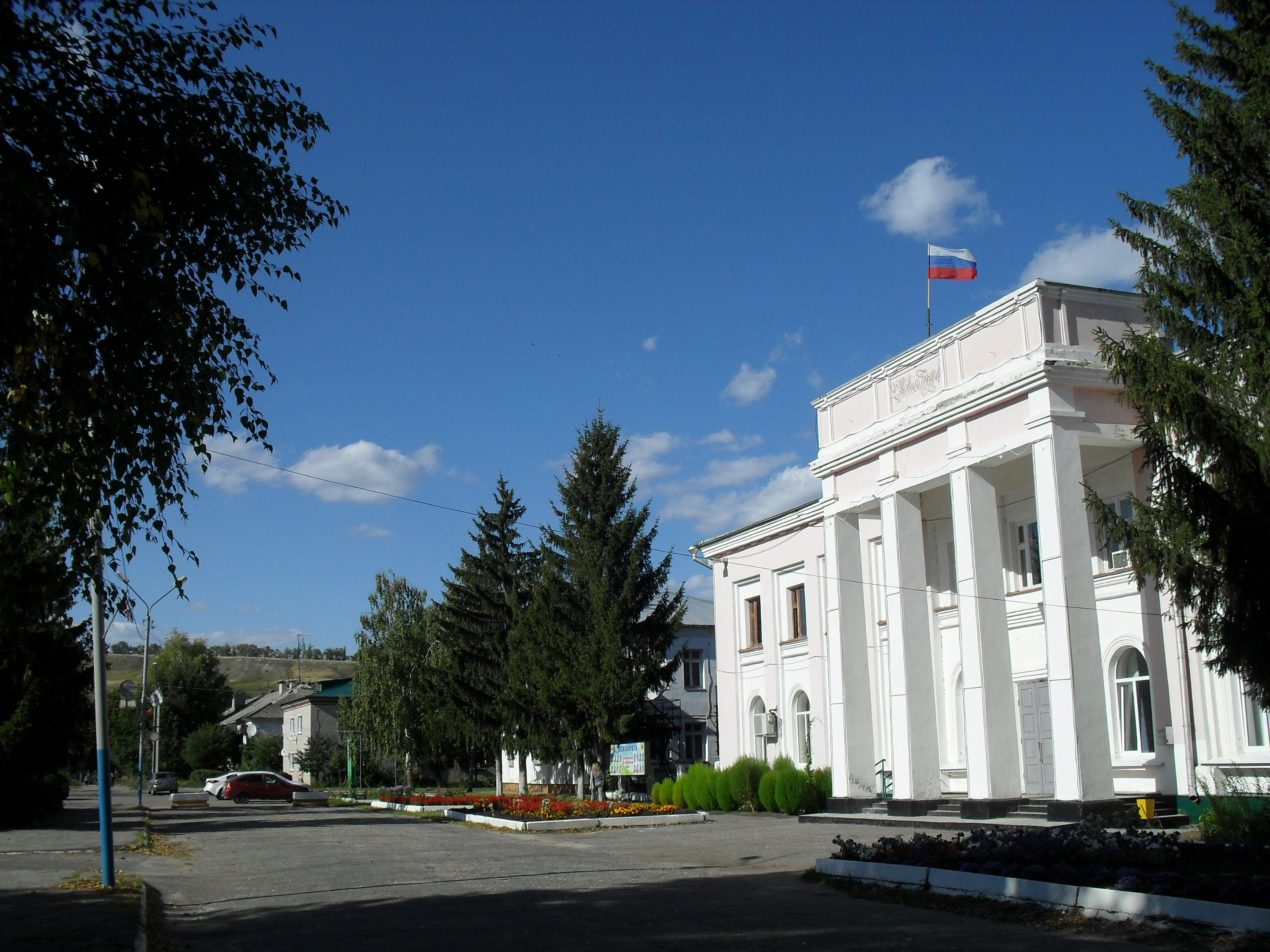
- Administration building, Sengiley, Sengileyvsky District

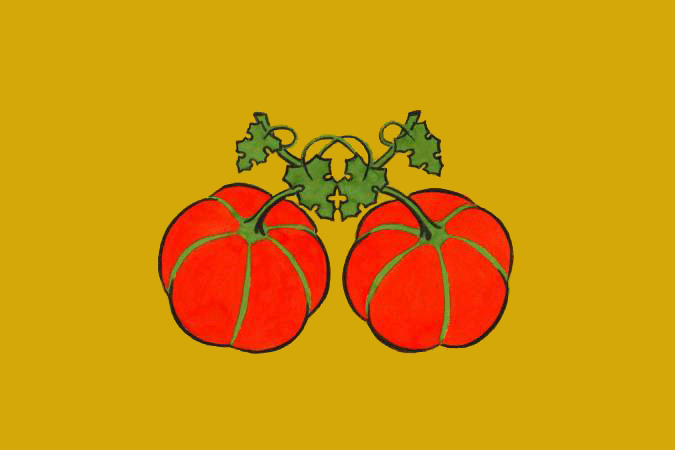
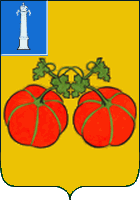
- Flag Coat of arms
- Location of Sengileyevsky District in Ulyanovsk Oblast
- Coordinates: 53°58′N 48°48′E
- Country: Russia
- Federal subject: Ulyanovsk Oblast
- Established: 16 July 1928
- Administrative center: Sengiley

Area
  - Total: 1,349 km^{2} (521 sq mi)

Population (2010 Census)
  - Total: 23,260
  - Density: 17.24/km^{2} (44.66/sq mi)
  - Urban: 60.6%
  - Rural: 39.4%

Administrative structure
  - Administrative divisions: 1 Towns of district significance, 2 Settlement okrugs, 3 Rural okrugs
  - Inhabited localities: 1 cities/towns, 3 urban-type settlements, 27 rural localities

Municipal structure
  - Municipally incorporated as: Sengileyevsky Municipal District
  - Municipal divisions: 3 urban settlements, 3 rural settlements
- Time zone: UTC+4 (UTC+04:00)
- OKTMO ID: 73636000
- Website: http://sengilej.3dn.ru/

Sengileyevsky District (Russian: Сенгилеевский райо́н) is an administrative and municipal district (raion), one of the twenty-one in Ulyanovsk Oblast, Russia. It is located in the center of the oblast. The area of the district is 1,349 square kilometers (521 sq mi). Its administrative center is the town of Sengiley. Population: 23,260 (2010 Census); 26,338 (2002 census); 29,334 (1989 Soviet census). The population of Sengiley accounts for 29.9% of the district's total population.
