= Baryshsky District =

Baryshsky District Барышский район
- District
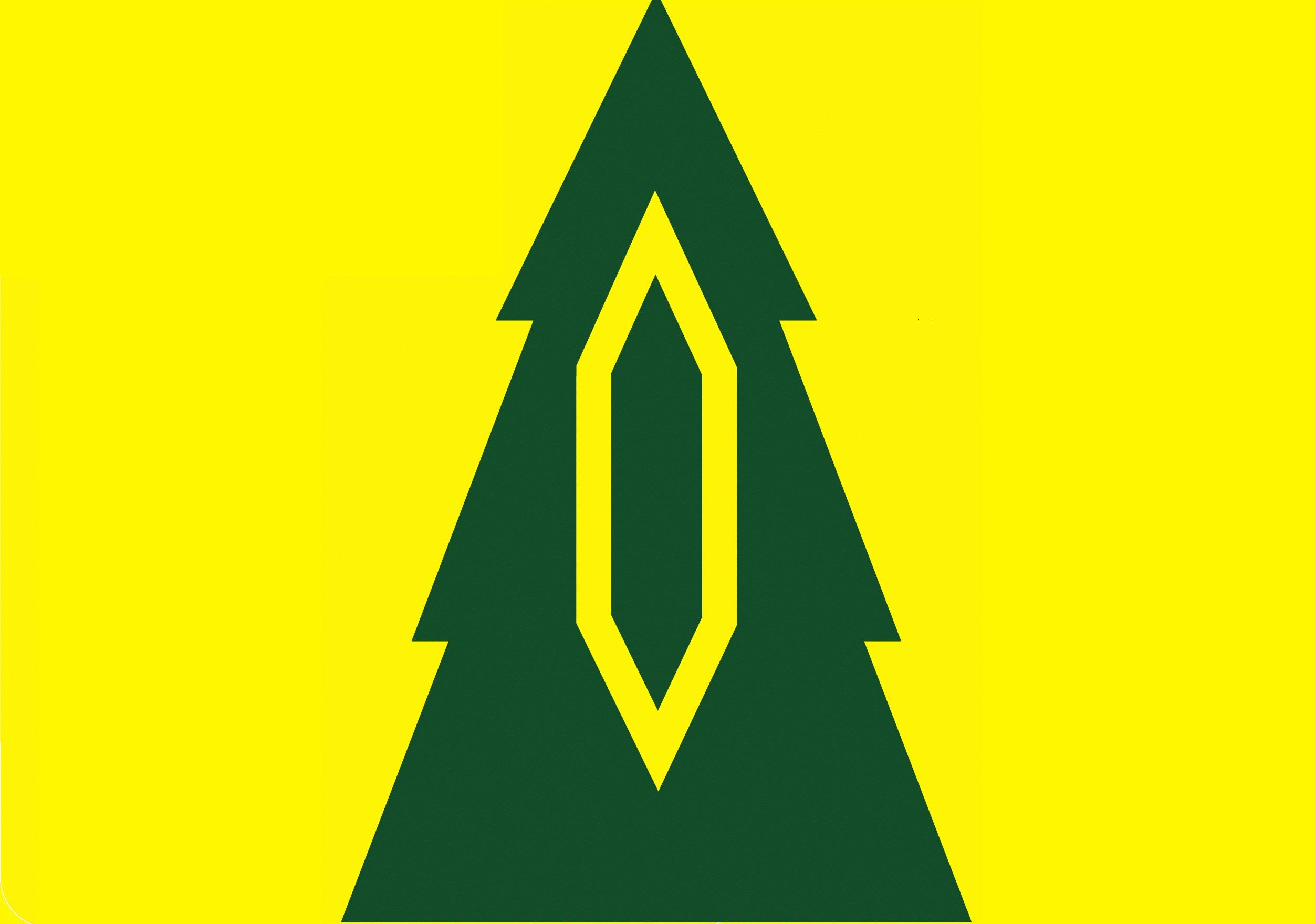
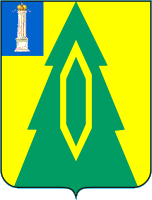
- Flag Coat of arms
- Location of Baryshsky District in Ulyanovsk Oblast
- Coordinates: 53°39′N 47°07′E
- Country: Russia
- Federal subject: Ulyanovsk Oblast
- Administrative center: Barysh

Area
  - Total: 2,255.8 km^{2} (871.0 sq mi)

Population (2010 Census)
  - Total: 44,034
  - Density: 19.520/km^{2} (50.557/sq mi)
  - Urban: 63.2%
  - Rural: 36.8%

Administrative structure
  - Administrative divisions: 1 Towns of district significance, 4 Settlement okrugs, 4 Rural okrugs
  - Inhabited localities: 1 cities/towns, 4 urban-type settlements, 68 rural localities

Municipal structure
  - Municipally incorporated as: Baryshsky Municipal District
  - Municipal divisions: 5 urban settlements, 4 rural settlements
- Time zone: UTC+4 (UTC+04:00)
- OKTMO ID: 73604000
- Website: http://barysh.org/

Baryshsky District (Russian: Бары́шский райо́н) is an administrative and municipal district (raion), one of the twenty-one in Ulyanovsk Oblast, Russia. It is located in the west of the oblast. The area of the district is 2,255.8 square kilometers (871.0 sq mi). Its administrative center is the town of Barysh. Population: 44,034 (2010 Census); 31,444 (2002 Census); 36,230 (1989 Soviet census). The population of Barysh accounts for 38.9% of the district's total population.
