= Radishchevo constituency =

Legislative constituency in Russia

Radishchevo single-member constituency
- Constituency of the Russian State Duma

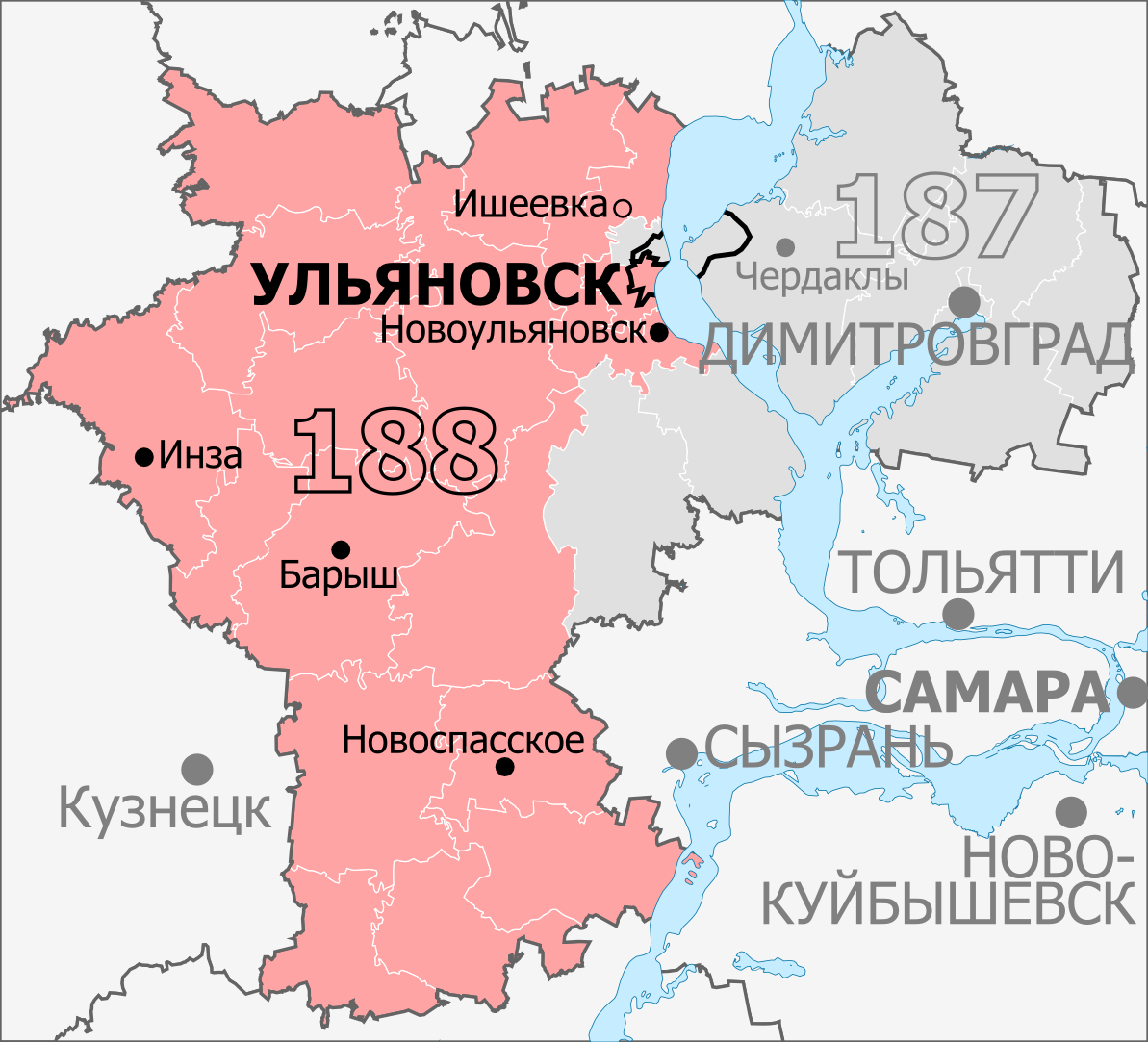
- Constituency boundaries since 2016
- Deputy: Vladimir Kononov; United Russia
- Federal subject: Ulyanovsk Oblast
- Districts: Bazarnosyzgansky, Baryshsky, Inzensky, Karsunsky, Kuzovatovsky, Maynsky, Nikolayevsky, Novospassky, Novoulyanovsk, Pavlovsky, Radishchevsky, Starokulatkinsky, Sursky, Tsilninsky, Ulyanovsk (Zasviyazhsky, Zheleznodorozhny), Ulyanovsky, Veshkaymsky
- Voters: 456,601 (2026)

The Radishchevo constituency (No.186 (Note: Zasviyazhsky constituency No.181 in 1993-1995, Sengiley constituency No.180 in 1995-2003, Melekessky constituency No.180 in 2003-2007, No.188 in 2016–2026)) is a Russian legislative constituency in Ulyanovsk Oblast. The constituency covers southern half of Ulyanovsk, its western suburbs and mostly rural western Ulyanovsk Oblast.

The constituency has been represented since 2026 by United Russia deputy Vladimir Kononov, four-term State Duma member and businessman, who won the open seat after five-term United Russia incumbent Vladislav Tretyak successfully sought re-election in the Preobrazhensky constituency.

== Boundaries ==
1993–1995 Zasviyazhsky constituency: Barysh, Baryshsky District, Bazarnosyzgansky District, Inzensky District, Karsunsky District, Kuzovatovsky District, Maynsky District, Sengileyevsky District, Sursky District, Tsilninsky District, Ulyanovsk (Zasviyazhsky, Zheleznodorozhny), Ulyanovsky District, Veshkaymsky District)
The constituency covered southern half of Ulyanovsk, its western suburbs as well as rural western and north-western Ulyanovsk Oblast.

1995–2003 Sengiley constituency: Barysh, Baryshsky District, Bazarnosyzgansky District, Cherdaklinsky District, Dimitrovgrad, Inzensky District, Karsunsky District, Kuzovatovsky District, Maynsky District, Melekessky District, Novomalyklinsky District, Nikolayevsky District, Novospassky District, Pavlovsky District, Radishchevsky District, Sengileyevsky District, Starokulatkinsky District, Staromaynsky District, Sursky District, Terengulsky District, Tsilninsky District, Veshkaymsky District
After the 1995 redistricting the constituency was significantly altered, retaining only its rural districts, losing its portion of Ulyanovsk and suburban Ulyanovsky District to Ulyanovsk constituency. This seat also gained eastern and southern Ulyanovsk Oblast from the former Leninsky constituency.

2003–2007 Melekessky constituency: Barysh, Baryshsky District, Bazarnosyzgansky District, Cherdaklinsky District, Dimitrovgrad, Inzensky District, Karsunsky District, Kuzovatovsky District, Maynsky District, Melekessky District, Novomalyklinsky District, Nikolayevsky District, Novospassky District, Pavlovsky District, Radishchevsky District, Sengileyevsky District, Starokulatkinsky District, Staromaynsky District, Sursky District, Terengulsky District, Tsilninsky District, Veshkaymsky District
The constituency retained its territory but changed its name from Sengiley to Melekessky constituency.

2016–present: Baryshsky District, Bazarnosyzgansky District, Inzensky District, Karsunsky District, Kuzovatovsky District, Maynsky District, Nikolayevsky District, Novospassky District, Novoulyanovsk, Pavlovsky District, Radishchevsky District, Starokulatkinsky District, Sursky District, Tsilninsky District, Ulyanovsk (Zasviyazhsky, Zheleznodorozhny), Ulyanovsky District, Veshkaymsky District
The constituency was re-created for the 2016 election and retained its western portion, losing eastern Ulyanovsk Oblast to Ulyanovsk constituency in exchange for southern half of Ulyanovsk and Ulyanovsky District.

== Members elected ==
Election	Member	Party
1993	Lyudmila Zhadanova	Independent
1995	Yekaterina Lakhova	Women of Russia
1999	Anatoly Golubkov	Fatherland – All Russia
2003	Valentin Ivanov	United Russia
2007	Proportional representation - no election by constituency	
2011	Proportional representation - no election by constituency	
2016	Vladislav Tretyak	United Russia
2021	Vladislav Tretyak	United Russia
2026	Vladimir Kononov	United Russia

== Election results ==
=== 1993 ===
Summary of the 12 December 1993 Russian legislative election in the Zasviyazhsky constituency
Candidate	Party	Votes	%
Lyudmila Zhadanova	Independent	152,659	46.83%
Yury Yegorov	Independent	–	10.50%
Oleg Berlyand	Party of Russian Unity and Accord	–	–
Aleksandr Kruglikov	Communist Party	–	–
Aleksey Lizin	Democratic Party	–	–
Yury Stepanov	Independent	–	–
Total		325,956	100%

=== 1995 ===
Summary of the 17 December 1995 Russian legislative election in the Sengiley constituency
Candidate	Party	Votes	%
Yekaterina Lakhova	Women of Russia	130,332	34.43%
Leonid Kozhendayev	Russian All-People's Movement	71,523	18.90%
Yury Goryachev	My Fatherland	63,386	16.75%
Viktor Ilyin	Independent	34,132	9.02%
Vladimir Povalyayev	Democratic Choice of Russia – United Democrats	20,880	5.52%
Valery Petrov	Liberal Democratic Party	11,569	3.06%
Mansur Sayfulov	Nur	10,612	2.80%
against all		27,323	7.22%
Total		378,525	100%

=== 1999 ===
Summary of the 19 December 1999 Russian legislative election in the Sengiley constituency
Candidate	Party	Votes	%
Anatoly Golubkov	Fatherland – All Russia	167,452	47.14%
Aleksandr Kruglikov	Communist Party	85,139	23.97%
Aleksandr Mayer	Our Home – Russia	25,413	7.15%
Lyudmila Zhadanova	Independent	20,852	5.87%
Vyacheslav Petrov	Liberal Democratic Party	10,248	2.88%
Pyotr Serbukov	Independent	7,581	2.13%
Anatoly Dneprov	Independent	2,585	0.73%
against all		28,850	8.12%
Total		355,247	100%

=== 2003 ===
Summary of the 7 December 2003 Russian legislative election in the Melekessky constituency
Candidate	Party	Votes	%
Valentin Ivanov	United Russia	103,724	34.11%
Yury Goryachev	Rodina	70,637	23.23%
Ravil Nasyrov	Communist Party	29,088	9.57%
Khanyafi Ramazanov	Independent	22,448	7.38%
Tamara Kharitonova	Liberal Democratic Party	16,173	5.32%
Vladimir Nikonov	Agrarian Party	15,224	5.01%
against all		38,850	12.78%
Total		304,306	100%

=== 2016 ===
Summary of the 18 September 2016 Russian legislative election in the Radishchevo constituency
Candidate	Party	Votes	%
Vladislav Tretyak	United Russia	192,859	65.62%
Yury Sinelshchikov	Communist Party	39,686	13.50%
Dmitry Grachev	Liberal Democratic Party	28,816	9.80%
Aleksey Arkhipov	A Just Russia	10,476	3.56%
Ruslan Ilyasov	Party of Growth	6,944	2.36%
Aleksandr Bragin	People's Freedom Party	4,194	1.43%
Nikolay Kislitsa	Yabloko	3,110	1.06%
Total		293,923	100%

=== 2021 ===
Summary of the 17-19 September 2021 Russian legislative election in the Radishchevo constituency
Candidate	Party	Votes	%
Vladislav Tretyak (incumbent)	United Russia	116,895	47.84%
Airat Gibatdinov	Communist Party	47,572	19.47%
Artyom Titov	Communists of Russia	15,892	6.50%
Margarita Barzhanova	A Just Russia — For Truth	14,358	6.07%
Sergey Marinin	Liberal Democratic Party	11,315	4.63%
Svetlana Goreva	New People	10,859	4.44%
Vladimir Ilyin	Party of Pensioners	5,704	2.33%
Ildar Gabitov	Rodina	4,233	1.73%
Andrey Gurin	The Greens	3,758	1.54%
Alyona Zotova	Party of Growth	3,084	1.26%
Nikolay Klyushenkov	Civic Platform	1,218	0.50%
Total		244,336	100%

=== 2026 ===
Summary of the 18-20 September 2026 Russian legislative election in the Radishchevo constituency
Candidate	Party	Votes	%
Vladimir Kononov	United Russia	202,811	61.67%
Sergey Marinin	Liberal Democratic Party	23,306	7.09%
Roman Sultashov	Communist Party	23,274	7.08%
Marat Aryapov	New People	18,548	5.64%
Kamil Safiullin	Communists of Russia	15,340	4.66%
Vladimir Malinin	Party of Pensioners	14,071	4.28%
Grigory Matveyev	A Just Russia	11,041	3.36%
Anzhelika Berestovskaya	The Greens	7,515	2.29%
Igor Safonov	Rodina	5,208	1.58%
Total		328,883	100%
