= Ulyanovsk constituency =

Legislative constituency in Russia

Ulyanovsk single-member constituency
- Constituency of the Russian State Duma

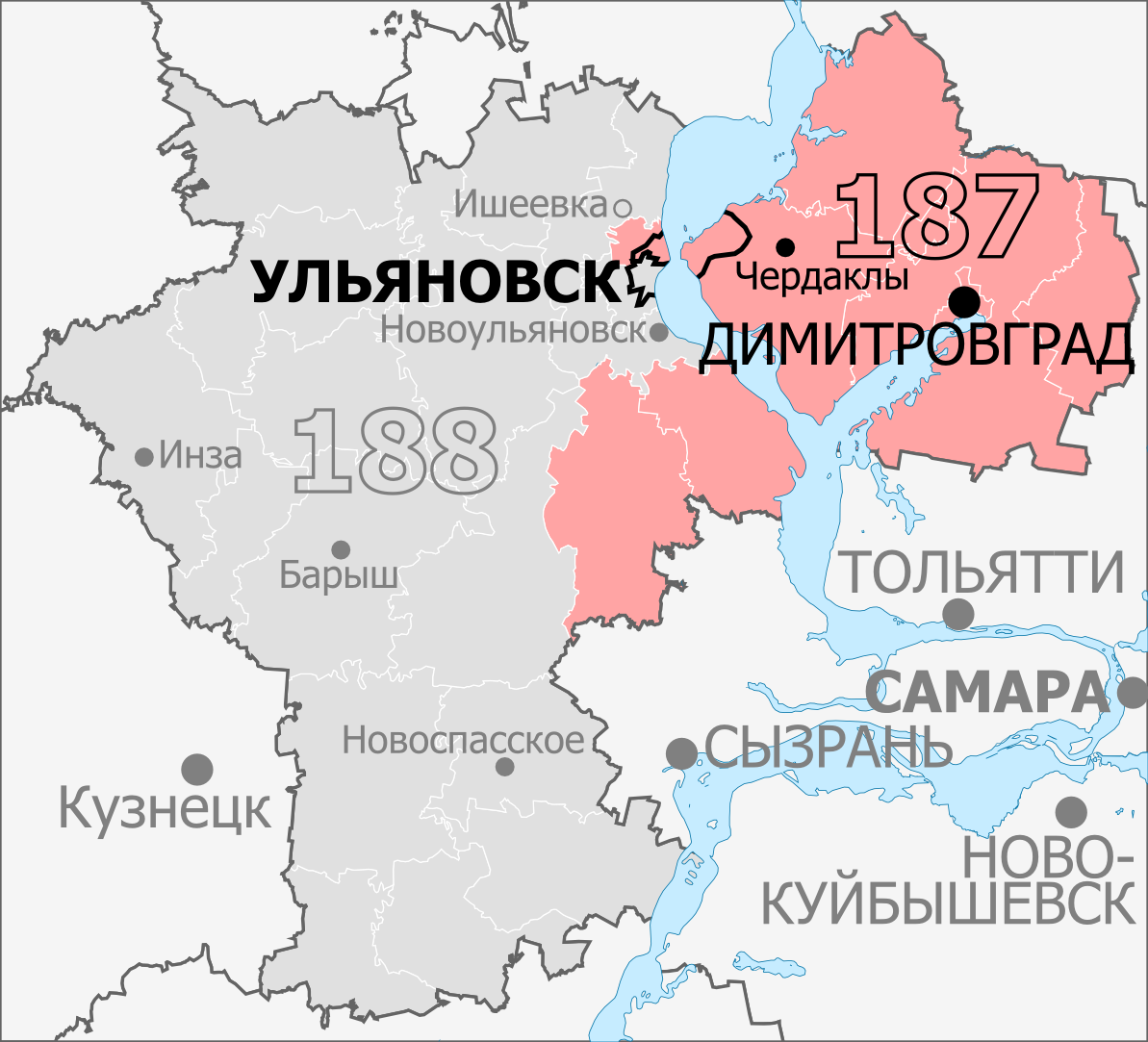
- Constituency boundaries since 2016
- Deputy: Vladimir Kameko; United Russia
- Federal subject: Ulyanovsk Oblast
- Districts: Cherdaklinsky, Dimitrovgrad, Melekessky, Novomalyklinsky, Sengileyevsky, Staromaynsky, Terengulsky, Ulyanovsk (Leninsky, Zavolzhsky)
- Voters: 456,869 (2026)

The Ulyanovsk constituency (No.185 (Note: Leninsky constituency No.180 in 1993-1995, No.181 in 1995-2007, No.187 in 2016–2026)) is a Russian legislative constituency in Ulyanovsk Oblast. The constituency covers northern half of Ulyanovsk, districts on the left bank of the Volga river, including Dimitrovgrad, as well as some rural areas to the south of Ulyanovsk.

The constituency has been represented since 2026 by United Russia deputy Vladimir Kameko, former Member of Legislative Assembly of Ulyanovsk Oblast and Gazprom executive, who won the open seat after three-term United Russia incumbent Vladimir Kononov successfully sought re-election in the neighbouring Radishchevo constituency.

== Boundaries ==
1993–1995 Leninsky constituency: Cherdaklinsky District, Dimitrovgrad, Melekessky District, Nikolayevsky District, Novomalyklinsky District, Novospassky District, Pavlovsky District, Radishchevsky District, Starokulatkinsky District, Staromaynsky District, Terengulsky District, Ulyanovsk (Leninsky, Zavolzhsky)
The constituency consisted of two non-contiguous areas: one comprised northern half of Ulyanovsk and eastern Ulyanovsk Oblast, including Dimitrovgrad, and the other – rural southern Ulyanovsk Oblast.

1995–2007: Ulyanovsk, Ulyanovsky District
After the 1995 redistricting the constituency was significantly altered, retaining only northern Ulyanovsk and losing the rest to Sengiley constituency. This seat instead gained the rest of Ulyanovsk and suburban Ulyanovsky District from the former Zasviyazhsky constituency.

2016–present: Cherdaklinsky District, Dimitrovgrad, Melekessky District, Novomalyklinsky District, Sengileyevsky District, Staromaynsky District, Terengulsky District, Ulyanovsk (Leninsky, Zavolzhsky)
The constituency was re-created for the 2016 election and retained northern half of Ulyanovsk, losing the rest to Radishchevo constituency. This seat re-gained eastern Ulyanovsk Oblast from the former Melekessky constituency.

== Members elected ==
Election	Member	Party
1993	Valery Sychyov (Note: appointed First Deputy Governor of Ulyanovsk Oblast in October 1995)	Independent
1995	Oleg Kazarov	Independent
1999	Vadim Orlov	Independent
2003	A by-election was scheduled after Against all line received the most votes	
2004	Yury Kogan	Liberal Democratic Party
2007	Proportional representation - no election by constituency	
2011	Proportional representation - no election by constituency	
2016	Alexey Kurinny	Communist Party
2021	Vladimir Kononov	United Russia
2026	Vladimir Kameko	United Russia

== Election results ==
=== 1993 ===
Summary of the 12 December 1993 Russian legislative election in the Leninsky constituency
Candidate	Party	Votes	%
Valery Sychyov	Independent	158,209	52.39%
Amir Akhmetov	Independent	–	12.20%
Nikolay Povtarev	Party of Russian Unity and Accord	–	–
Mansur Shangareyev	Independent	–	–
Total		301,964	100%

=== 1995 ===
Summary of the 17 December 1995 Russian legislative election in the Ulyanovsk constituency
Candidate	Party	Votes	%
Oleg Kazarov	Independent	88,391	25.94%
Vera Makhlova	Our Home – Russia	49,168	14.43%
Sergey Svetunkov	Social Democrats	37,594	11.03%
Gennady Matveyev	Independent	27,701	8.13%
Nikolay Poddubny	Communist Party	25,869	7.59%
Vasily Polishchuk	Congress of Russian Communities	24,013	7.05%
Aleksandr Kishkinev	Liberal Democratic Party	17,920	5.26%
Boris Gunko	Communists and Working Russia - for the Soviet Union	10,058	2.95%
Viktor Sluzhivoy	Trade Unions and Industrialists – Union of Labour	10,045	2.95%
Nikolay Vasilyev	Independent	6,602	1.94%
against all		32,692	9.60%
Total		340,693	100%

=== 1999 ===
Summary of the 19 December 1999 Russian legislative election in the Ulyanovsk constituency
Candidate	Party	Votes	%
Vadim Orlov	Independent	74,630	21.84%
Oleg Kazarov (incumbent)	Communist Party	54,295	15.89%
Yury Polyanskov	Fatherland – All Russia	47,059	13.77%
Yury Stozharov	Independent	24,453	7.16%
Galina Smolyankina	Independent	17,962	5.26%
Lyudmila Tikhonova	Our Home – Russia	15,450	4.52%
Viktor Zharkov	Independent	14,914	4.36%
Anatoly Nechayev	Yabloko	14,468	4.23%
Vasily Polishchuk	Congress of Russian Communities-Yury Boldyrev Movement	9,079	2.66%
Valery Kozhevnikov	Independent	8,107	2.37%
against all		53,100	15.54%
Total		341,718	100%

=== 2003 ===
A by-election was scheduled after Against all line received the most votes.

Summary of the 7 December 2003 Russian legislative election in the Ulyanovsk constituency
Candidate	Party	Votes	%
Galina Fedorova	Independent	28,824	9.65%
Anatoly Litvinov	Independent	27,389	9.17%
Aleksandr Kruglikov	Communist Party	27,275	9.13%
Vadim Orlov (incumbent)	People's Party	26,803	8.97%
Yury Kogan	Liberal Democratic Party	24,397	8.16%
Tatyana Sergeyeva	Party of Russia's Rebirth-Russian Party of Life	23,608	7.90%
Sergey Gerasimov	Union of Right Forces	16,222	5.43%
Aleksandr Polyakov	Independent	15,806	5.29%
Igor Igin	Independent	15,452	5.17%
Nikolay Abramov	Independent	9,856	3.30%
Yevgeny Ofitserov	Yabloko	7,734	2.59%
Sergey Seryubin	Independent	3,497	1.17%
Yury Pimenov	Independent	3,338	1.12%
Aleksandr Zhuravlev	United Russian Party Rus'	1,424	0.48%
against all		59,048	19.76%
Total		299,227	100%

=== 2004 March ===
Another by-election was scheduled after Against all line received the most votes.

Summary of the 14 March 2004 by-election in the Ulyanovsk constituency
Candidate	Party	Votes	%
Yury Goryachev	Independent	42,392	13.10%
Gennady Savinov	Independent	35,793	11.06%
Galina Fedorova	Independent	31,931	9.87%
Yury Kogan	Liberal Democratic Party	30,126	9.31%
Nikolay Abramov	Independent	23,863	7.37%
Sergey Gerasimov	Independent	23,838	7.36%
Raisa Baranova	Independent	20,281	6.26%
Igor Igin	Independent	16,587	5.12%
Aleksey Korniyenko	Communist Party	13,718	4.24%
Aleksandr Polyakov	Independent	6,248	1.93%
Viktor Naumenko	Independent	2,003	0.61%
Pavel Zverev	Independent	1,332	0.41%
against all		69,564	21.50%
Total		323,496	100%

=== 2004 December ===
Summary of the 5 December 2004 by-election in the Ulyanovsk constituency
Candidate	Party	Votes	%
Yury Kogan	Liberal Democratic Party	75,653	24.95%
Nikolay Abramov	Independent	61,132	20.16%
Galina Fedorova	Independent	44,130	14.55%
Vladimir Aladin	Independent	20,150	6.64%
Sergey Tagashyov	Independent	11,248	3.71%
Nikolay Smoroda	Independent	10,645	3.51%
Ilya Baskin	Independent	9,742	3.21%
Olga Bakhanova	Independent	8,141	2.68%
against all		54,628	18.02%
Total		303,126	100%

=== 2016 ===
Summary of the 18 September 2016 Russian legislative election in the Ulyanovsk constituency
Candidate	Party	Votes	%
Alexey Kurinny	Communist Party	82,025	35.48%
Igor Tikhonov	United Russia	81,293	35.17%
Sergey Marinin	Liberal Democratic Party	21,212	9.18%
Oleg Goryachev	Yabloko	15,997	6.92%
Aleksey Kulakov	A Just Russia	8,372	3.62%
Sergey Pronin	Patriots of Russia	5,412	2.34%
Nikolay Klyushenkov	Party of Growth	4,084	1.77%
Vladimir Basenkov	Rodina	2,659	1.15%
Eduard Gebel	People's Freedom Party	2,314	1.00%
Total		231,166	100%

=== 2021 ===
Summary of the 17-19 September 2021 Russian legislative election in the Ulyanovsk constituency
Candidate	Party	Votes	%
Vladimir Kononov	United Russia	56,118	28.91%
Vitaly Kuzin	Communist Party	46,854	24.14%
Mikhail Dolgov	Communists of Russia	24,116	12.42%
Dmitry Grachev	Liberal Democratic Party	15,216	7.84%
Valentina Nikonova	New People	12,016	6.19%
Andrey Ilgachev	Party of Pensioners	6,878	3.54%
Vasilisa Kiseleva	Civic Platform	6,328	3.26%
Olga Sevastyanova	The Greens	4,974	2.56%
Yekaterina Tolchina	Party of Growth	3,195	1.65%
Tatyana Molozina	Russian Party of Freedom and Justice	3,189	1.64%
Roman Milovanov	Rodina	3,020	1.56%
Total		194,120	100%

=== 2026 ===
Summary of the 18-20 September 2026 Russian legislative election in the Ulyanovsk constituency
Candidate	Party	Votes	%
Vladimir Kameko	United Russia	143,446	48.29%
Anton Shilov	Communist Party	41,685	14.03%
Yury Belousov	New People	29,399	9.90%
Dmitry Grachev	Liberal Democratic Party	25,042	8.43%
Aleksey Yakushev	Rodina	15,927	5.36%
Andrey Sedov	A Just Russia	15,367	5.17%
Leonid Kostikov	Communists of Russia	11,928	4.02%
Igor Yuzhalin	The Greens	6,249	2.10%
Total		297,057	100%
