= Maksimovka =

Maksimovka (Russian: Максимовка) is the name of several rural localities in Russia:

- Maksimovka, Altai Krai, a selo under the administrative jurisdiction of the town of krai significance of Slavgorod, Altai Krai
- Maksimovka, Amur Oblast, a selo in Maksimovsky Rural Settlement of Oktyabrsky District of Amur Oblast
- Maksimovka, Miyakinsky District, Republic of Bashkortostan, a village in Miyakibashevsky Selsoviet of Miyakinsky District of the Republic of Bashkortostan
- Maksimovka, Sterlitamaksky District, Republic of Bashkortostan, a village in Maksimovsky Selsoviet of Sterlitamaksky District of the Republic of Bashkortostan
- Maksimovka, Belgorod Oblast, a selo in Shebekinsky District of Belgorod Oblast
- Maksimovka, Ivanovo Oblast, a village in Furmanovsky District of Ivanovo Oblast
- Maksimovka, Republic of Kalmykia, a settlement under the administrative jurisdiction of the City of Elista in the Republic of Kalmykia
- Maksimovka, Kaluga Oblast, a village in Maloyaroslavetsky District of Kaluga Oblast
- Maksimovka, Kurgan Oblast, a village in Yalansky Selsoviet of Safakulevsky District of Kurgan Oblast
- Maksimovka, Kursk Oblast, a village in Soldatsky Selsoviet of Gorshechensky District of Kursk Oblast
- Maksimovka, Leningrad Oblast, a village in Sabskoye Settlement Municipal Formation of Volosovsky District of Leningrad Oblast
- Maksimovka, Istrinsky District, Moscow Oblast, a village in Yermolinskoye Rural Settlement of Istrinsky District of Moscow Oblast
- Maksimovka, Voskresensky District, Moscow Oblast, a village in Fedinskoye Rural Settlement of Voskresensky District of Moscow Oblast
- Maksimovka, Nizhny Novgorod Oblast, a village in Bolshearyevsky Selsoviet of Urensky District of Nizhny Novgorod Oblast
- Maksimovka, Gorkovsky District, Omsk Oblast, a village in Lezhansky Rural Okrug of Gorkovsky District of Omsk Oblast
- Maksimovka, Sherbakulsky District, Omsk Oblast, a selo in Maksimovsky Rural Okrug of Sherbakulsky District of Omsk Oblast
- Maksimovka, Tyukalinsky District, Omsk Oblast, a village in Bekishevsky Rural Okrug of Tyukalinsky District of Omsk Oblast
- Maksimovka, Orenburg Oblast, a selo in Maksimovsky Selsoviet of Ponomaryovsky District of Orenburg Oblast
- Maksimovka, Penza Oblast, a selo in Pervomaysky Selsoviet of Kamensky District of Penza Oblast
- Maksimovka, Primorsky Krai, a selo in Terneysky District of Primorsky Krai
- Maksimovka, Sapozhkovsky District, Ryazan Oblast, a settlement under the administrative jurisdiction of the work settlement of Sapozhok in Sapozhkovsky District of Ryazan Oblast
- Maksimovka, Sarayevsky District, Ryazan Oblast, a village in Mozharsky Rural Okrug of Sarayevsky District of Ryazan Oblast
- Maksimovka, Samara Oblast, a selo in Bogatovsky District of Samara Oblast
- Maksimovka, Saratov Oblast, a selo in Bazarno-Karabulaksky District of Saratov Oblast
- Maksimovka, Gagarinsky District, Smolensk Oblast, a village in Akatovskoye Rural Settlement of Gagarinsky District of Smolensk Oblast
- Maksimovka, Khislavichsky District, Smolensk Oblast, a village in Kolesnikovskoye Rural Settlement of Khislavichsky District of Smolensk Oblast
- Maksimovka, Bondarsky District, Tambov Oblast, a selo in Grazhdanovsky Selsoviet of Bondarsky District of Tambov Oblast
- Maksimovka, Zherdevsky District, Tambov Oblast, a village in Alexeyevsky Selsoviet of Zherdevsky District of Tambov Oblast
- Maksimovka, Republic of Tatarstan, a village in Tetyushsky District of the Republic of Tatarstan
- Maksimovka, Tver Oblast, a village in Belsky District of Tver Oblast
- Maksimovka (pochinok), Lozo-Lyuksky Selsoviet, Igrinsky District, Udmurt Republic, a pochinok in Lozo-Lyuksky Selsoviet of Igrinsky District of the Udmurt Republic
- Maksimovka (village), Lozo-Lyuksky Selsoviet, Igrinsky District, Udmurt Republic, a village in Lozo-Lyuksky Selsoviet of Igrinsky District of the Udmurt Republic
- Maksimovka, Ulyanovsk Oblast, a selo under the administrative jurisdiction of Isheyevsky Settlement Okrug in Ulyanovsky District of Ulyanovsk Oblast
- Maksimovka, Vladimir Oblast, a village in Melenkovsky District of Vladimir Oblast
- Maksimovka, Volgograd Oblast, a khutor in Savinsky Selsoviet of Pallasovsky District of Volgograd Oblast
- Maksimovka, Vologda Oblast, a settlement in Kamensky Selsoviet of Gryazovetsky District of Vologda Oblast
- Maksimovka, Yaroslavl Oblast, a village in Nekouzsky Rural Okrug of Nekouzsky District of Yaroslavl Oblast
