= Inzensky =

Inzensky (masculine), Inzenskaya (feminine), or Inzenskoye (neuter) may refer to:

- Inzensky District, a district of Ulyanovsk Oblast, Russia
- Inzenskoye Urban Settlement, a municipal formation which the town of district significance of Inza in Inzensky District of Ulyanovsk Oblast, Russia is incorporated as
