= Isheyevka =

Isheyevka (Russian: Ишеевка) is the name of several inhabited localities in Russia.

Urban localities

- Isheyevka, Ulyanovsk Oblast, a work settlement under the administrative jurisdiction of Isheyevsky Settlement Okrug of Ulyanovsky District of Ulyanovsk Oblast

Rural localities

- Isheyevka, Penza Oblast, a settlement in Balkashinsky Selsoviet of Belinsky District of Penza Oblast
