= Timofeyevka =

One of several places in Russia

Timofeyevka (Russian: Тимофеевка) is the name of several rural localities in Russia:

- Timofeyevka, Ivanovo Oblast, a village in Ilyinsky District of Ivanovo Oblast
- Timofeyevka, Kaliningrad Oblast, a settlement under the administrative jurisdiction of Chernyakhovsk Town of District Significance, Chernyakhovsky District, Kaliningrad Oblast
- Timofeyevka, Kaluga Oblast, a village in Ferzikovsky District of Kaluga Oblast
- Timofeyevka, Kursk Oblast, a village in Udobensky Selsoviet of Gorshechensky District of Kursk Oblast
- Timofeyevka, Nizhny Novgorod Oblast, a village in Deyanovsky Selsoviet of Pilninsky District of Nizhny Novgorod Oblast
- Timofeyevka, Novosibirsk Oblast, a village in Vengerovsky District of Novosibirsk Oblast
- Timofeyevka, Nadezhdinsky District, Primorsky Krai, a settlement in Nadezhdinsky District, Primorsky Krai
- Timofeyevka, Olginsky District, Primorsky Krai, a settlement in Olginsky District, Primorsky Krai
- Timofeyevka, Pskov Oblast, a village in Nevelsky District of Pskov Oblast
- Timofeyevka, Ryazan Oblast, a village in Frunzensky Rural Okrug of Mikhaylovsky District of Ryazan Oblast
- Timofeyevka, Samara Oblast, a selo in Stavropolsky District of Samara Oblast
- Timofeyevka, Tambov Oblast, a selo in Chakinsky Selsoviet of Rzhaksinsky District of Tambov Oblast
- Timofeyevka (Berezkinskoye Rural Settlement), Vysokogorsky District, Republic of Tatarstan, a village in Vysokogorsky District of the Republic of Tatarstan; municipally, a part of Berezkinskoye Rural Settlement of that district
- Timofeyevka (Usadskoye Rural Settlement), Vysokogorsky District, Republic of Tatarstan, a village in Vysokogorsky District of the Republic of Tatarstan; municipally, a part of Usadskoye Rural Settlement of that district
- Timofeyevka, Tula Oblast, a village in Protasovsky Rural Okrug of Dubensky District of Tula Oblast
- Timofeyevka, Ulyanovsk Oblast, a village in Novonikulinsky Rural Okrug of Tsilninsky District of Ulyanovsk Oblast
