= Mother Patroness Monument =

- Анне-Пирĕшти палăкĕ

General information
- Type: Monument
- Location: Cheboksary, Chuvash Republic
- Coordinates: 56°8′54.19″N 47°14′31.7″E
- Construction started: 2003
- Inaugurated: 2003

Height
- Height: 46 m (151 ft)

Design and construction
- Architect: Vladimir Nagornov

Mother Patroness (Russian: Мать-Покровительница, Mat’-Pokrovitel’nitsa; Chuvash: Aнне-Пирĕшти, Anne-Pirĕshti) - a monument dedicated to his mother. It's one of the landmarks of the city of Cheboksary, Chuvash Republic, symbol of the city and the entire country as a whole, as well as the symbol of the revival of spiritual values of the Chuvash people.

Housed in restored historic part of Cheboksary on the ancient hill, adjacent to the western waterfront Cheboksary Bay. Size of the monument exceeds all created before in Chuvashia monuments. Together with its pedestal height is 46 meters.

The label on the bottom of the basin, in two languages (Russian and Chuvash) written the phrase "Blessed are my children, living in peace and love."

== History ==
Monument project developed on the idea and concept of the first President of Chuvashia Nikolay Fyodorov. For the construction of the monument on the initiative of the creative intelligentsia, and a number of public organizations of the republic established a charitable foundation.

In the final phase of construction of the monumental complex was attended by cadets of the military department of the Chuvash State University. Ulyanov. The monument was opened on 9 May 2003.

The ex-pope of the Church of the Dormition of Mary in Cheboksary Andrej Berman criticized a lot the metropolitan of Cheboksary and all Chuvashia, Barnabas for idolatry, because he blessed the monument.

== Sculptor ==
Monument "Mother Patroness" - one of the most important works of Vladimir Nagornova, who worked together with academician A. Trofimov (scientific advisor), architects V. Filatov, Y. Novoselov, A. Oreshnikov.

== Links ==
- Mother Patroness monument.
