= Bolshoye Nagatkino =

Rural locality in Ulyanovsk Oblast, Russia

Coordinates: 54°31′11″N 47°58′34″E

Bolshoye Nagatkino (Russian: Большо́е Нага́ткино) is a rural locality (a selo) and the administrative center of Tsilninsky District, Ulyanovsk Oblast, Russia. Population: 5,462 (2010 census); 5,235 (2002 census); 5,101 (1989 Soviet census).
