= Novaya Malykla =

Rural locality in Ulyanovsk Oblast, Russia

Coordinates: 54°12′20″N 49°55′44″E

Novaya Malykla (Russian: Новая Малыкла) is a rural locality (a selo) and the administrative center of Novomalyklinsky District, Ulyanovsk Oblast, Russia. Population: 3,273 (2010 census); 3,321 (2002 census); 3,230 (1989 Soviet census).
