= Alexey Kurinny =

Russian politician

Alexey Kurinny MP
- Алексей Куринный
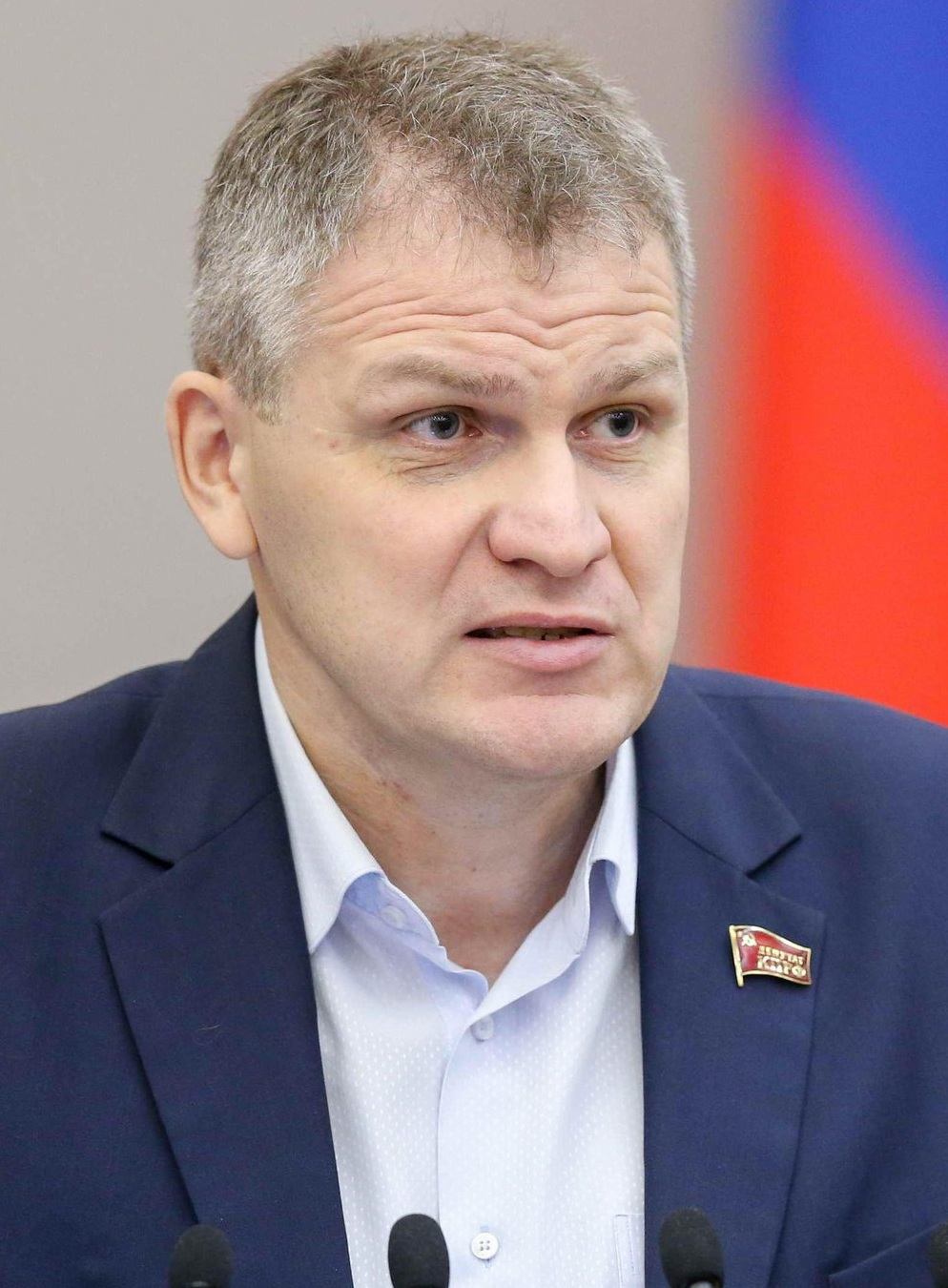

Member of the State Duma (Party List Seat)
- Incumbent
- Assumed office 12 October 2021

Member of the State Duma for Ulyanovsk Oblast
- In office 5 October 2016 – 12 October 2021
- Preceded by: constituency re-established
- Succeeded by: Vladimir Kononov
- Constituency: Ulyanovsk (No.187)

Personal details
- Born: 18 January 1974 (age 52) Tskhinvali, South Ossetian AO, Georgian SSR, USSR
- Party: CPRF
- Education: MSU - Ulyanovsk (M.D.); Samara State Medical University (Ph.D.)
- Occupation: Surgeon

Alexey Vladimirovich Kurinny (Russian: Алексей Владимирович Куринный; born 18 January 1974, Tskhinvali) is a Russian political figure and a deputy of the 7th and 8th State Dumas.

From 1997 to 2010, he worked as a surgeon at the Ulyanovsk city hospital. At the same time, he also taught at the Faculty of Medicine of the Ulyanovsk State University. From 2004 to 2008, he was the deputy of the Legislative Assembly of Ulyanovsk Oblast of the 3rd convocation. From 2008 to 2013, he was the deputy of the Legislative Assembly of Ulyanovsk Oblast of the 4th convocation. On March 14, 2010, Kurinny was nominated by the Communist Party of the Russian Federation for the post of mayor of Ulyanovsk but lost to the candidate from the United Russia Alexey Pinkov. From 2011 to 2013, he was the chief physician of the Ulyanovsk regional clinical center of specialized types of medical care name of honored doctor of Russia E. M. Chuchkalov. From 2013 to 2016, Kurinny was the deputy of the Legislative Assembly of Ulyanovsk Oblast of the 5th convocation. He left the post to become the deputy of the 7th State Duma. Since September 2021, he has served as deputy of the 8th State Duma.

== Sanctions ==
He was sanctioned by the UK government in 2022 in relation to the Russo-Ukrainian War.
