= Bazarnosyzgansky District =

Bazarnosyzgansky District Базарносызганский район
- District
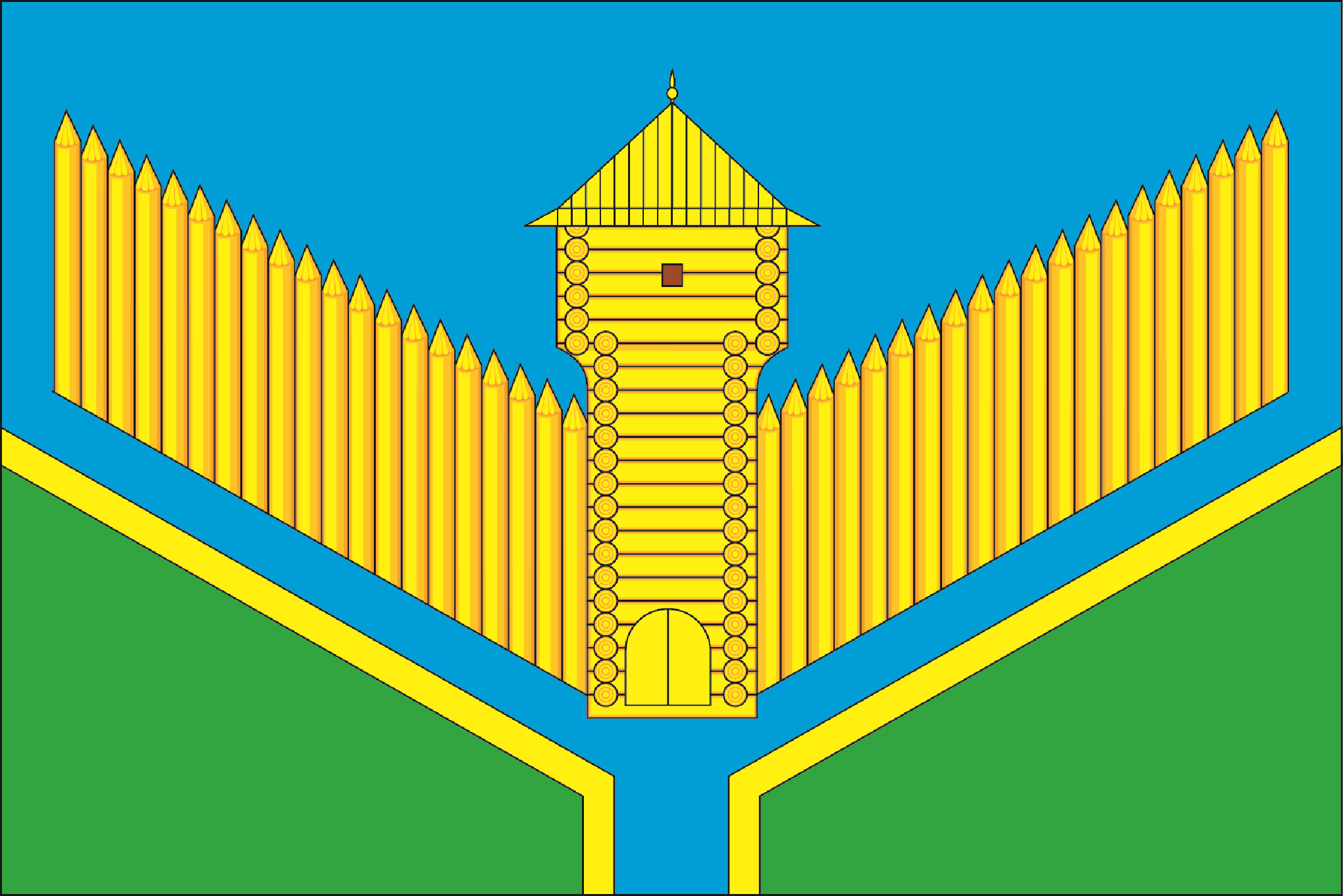
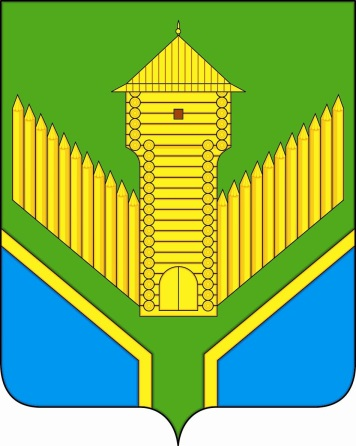
- Flag Coat of arms
- Location of Bazarnosyzgansky District in Ulyanovsk Oblast
- Coordinates: 53°45′07″N 46°45′37″E
- Country: Russia
- Federal subject: Ulyanovsk Oblast
- Established: 1935 (first); 1989 (second)
- Administrative center: Bazarny Syzgan

Area
  - Total: 825.2 km^{2} (318.6 sq mi)

Population (2010 Census)
  - Total: 10,083
  - Density: 12.22/km^{2} (31.65/sq mi)
  - Urban: 56.7%
  - Rural: 43.3%

Administrative structure
  - Administrative divisions: 1 Settlement okrugs, 4 Rural okrugs
  - Inhabited localities: 1 urban-type settlements, 31 rural localities

Municipal structure
  - Municipally incorporated as: Bazarnosyzgansky Municipal District
  - Municipal divisions: 1 urban settlements, 4 rural settlements
- Time zone: UTC+4 (UTC+04:00)
- OKTMO ID: 73602000
- Website: http://www.bsizgan.ulregion.ru/

Bazarnosyzgansky District (Russian: Базарносызганский райо́н) is an administrative and municipal district (raion), one of the twenty-one in Ulyanovsk Oblast, Russia. It is located in the west of the oblast. The area of the district is 825.2 square kilometers (318.6 sq mi). Its administrative center is the urban locality (a work settlement) of Bazarny Syzgan. Population: 10,083 (2010 Census); 11,363 (2002 Census). The population of Bazarny Syzgan accounts for 56.7% of the district's total population.

== History ==
The district was first established in 1935. In 1956, it was merged into Inzensky District. It was re-established in 1989.
