= Bazarny Syzgan =

Bazarny Syzgan Базарный Сызган
- Work settlement
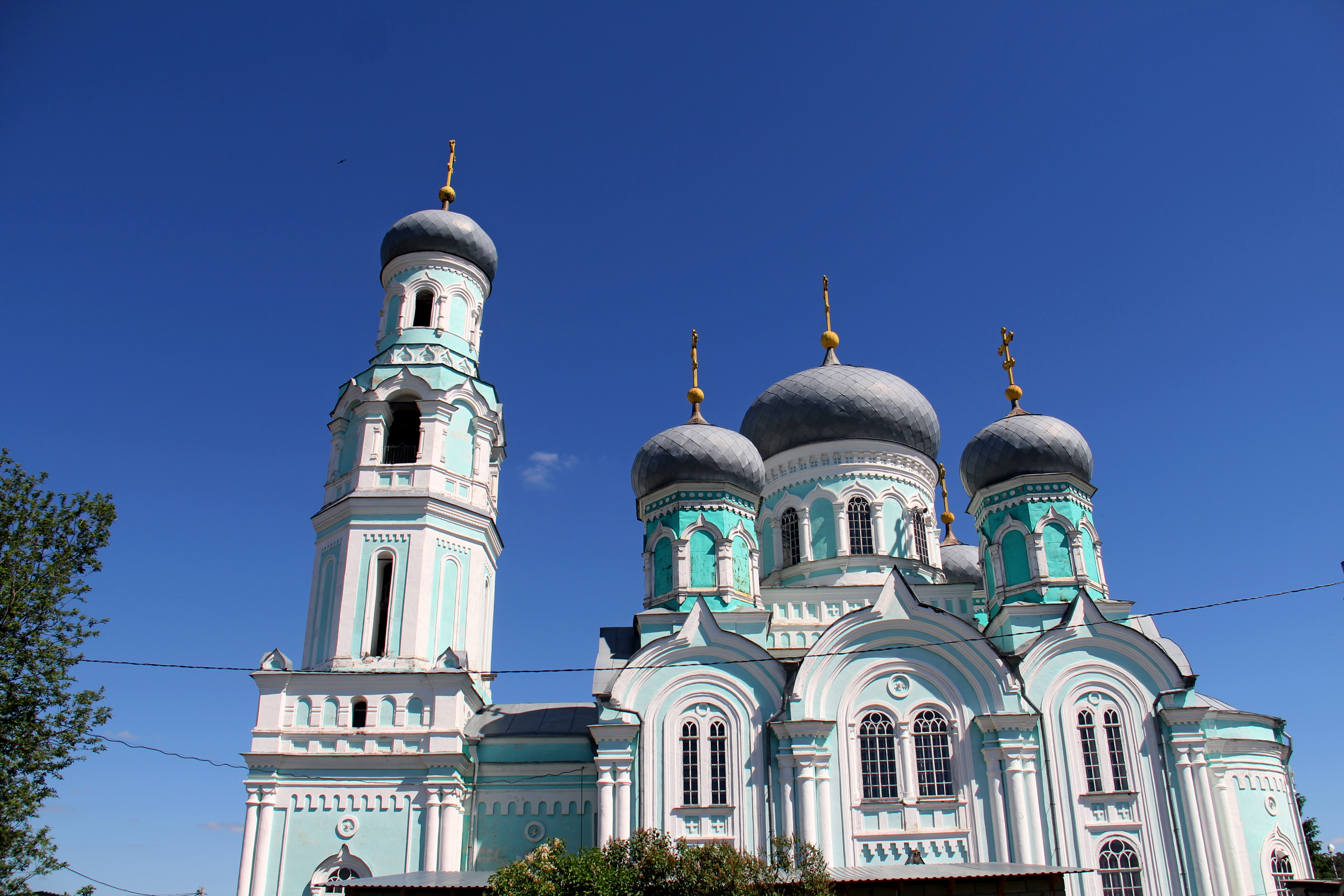
- Temple of Demetrius of Thessalonica in Bazarny Syzgan

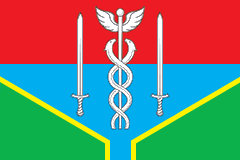
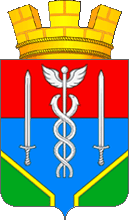
- Flag Coat of arms
- Interactive map of Bazarny Syzgan
- Location of Bazarny Syzgan Bazarny Syzgan (Ulyanovsk Oblast)
- Coordinates: 53°44′52″N 46°45′26″E
- Country: Russia
- Federal subject: Ulyanovsk Oblast
- Administrative district: Bazarnosyzgansky District
- Founded: 1638
- Elevation: 249 m (817 ft)

Population (2010 Census)
  - Total: 5,715
  - Estimate (2021): 4,494 (−21.4%)

Administrative status
  - Capital of: Bazarnosyzgansky District

Municipal status
  - Municipal district: Bazarnosyzgansky Municipal District
  - Urban settlement: Bazarnosyzganskoye Urban Settlement
  - Capital of: Bazarnosyzgansky Municipal District, Bazarnosyzganskoye Urban Settlement
- Time zone: UTC+4 (UTC+04:00)
- Postal code: 433700
- OKTMO ID: 73602151051

Bazarny Syzgan (Russian: База́рный Сызга́н) is an urban locality (work settlement) and the administrative center of Bazarnosyzgansky District of Ulyanovsk Oblast, Russia. Population: 5,715 (2010 census); 6,092 (2002 census); 6,708 (1989 Soviet census).
