= Research Institute of Atomic Reactors =

Russian research institute

Coordinates: 54°11′11″N 49°28′31″E

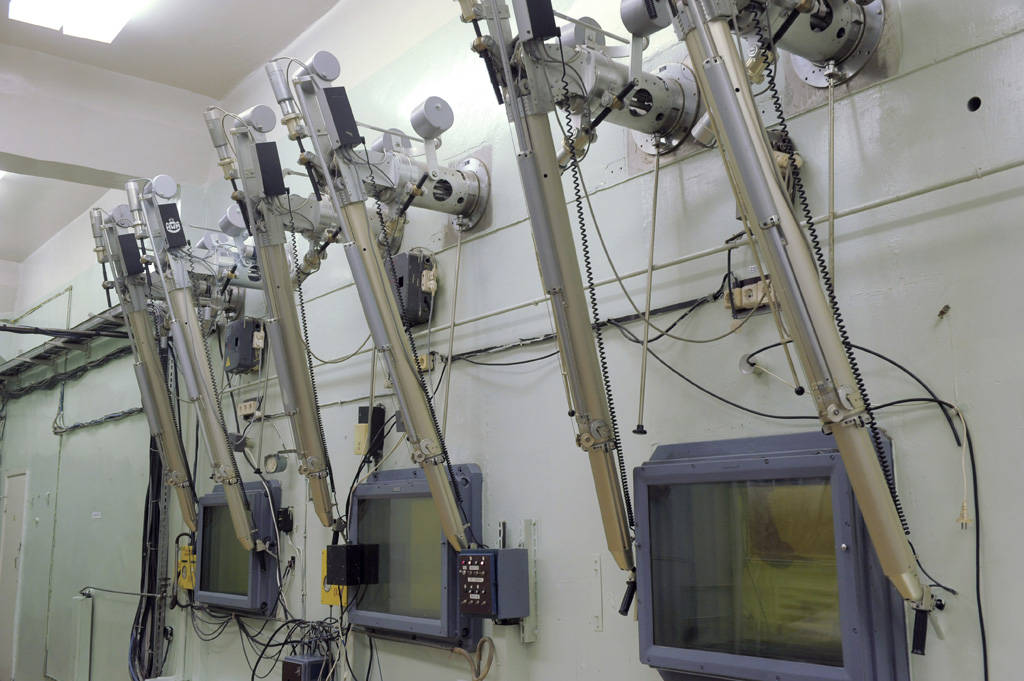
- Formation: 1956; 70 years ago
- Headquarters: Dimitrovgrad, Ulyanovsk Oblast, Russia
- Members: Rosatom
- Official languages: Russian and English
- Director: Tuzov Alexander Alexandrovich
- Website: www.niiar.ru

The Research Institute of Atomic Reactors (Russian: Научно-исследовательский институт атомных реакторов; RIAR) is an institute for nuclear reactor research in Dimitrovgrad in Ulyanovsk Oblast, Russia. The institute houses eight nuclear research reactors: SM, Arbus (ACT-1), MIR.M1, RBT-6, RBT-10 / 1, RBT-10 / 2, BOR-60 and VK-50.

A senior president of General Atomics said in May 2015 that the world's best reactor for "developing new materials that will be able to endure the much higher temperatures, and endure the more energetic and neutron rich radiation environment inside the reactor", is the BOR-60. BOR-60 had its operating license extended to 2020.

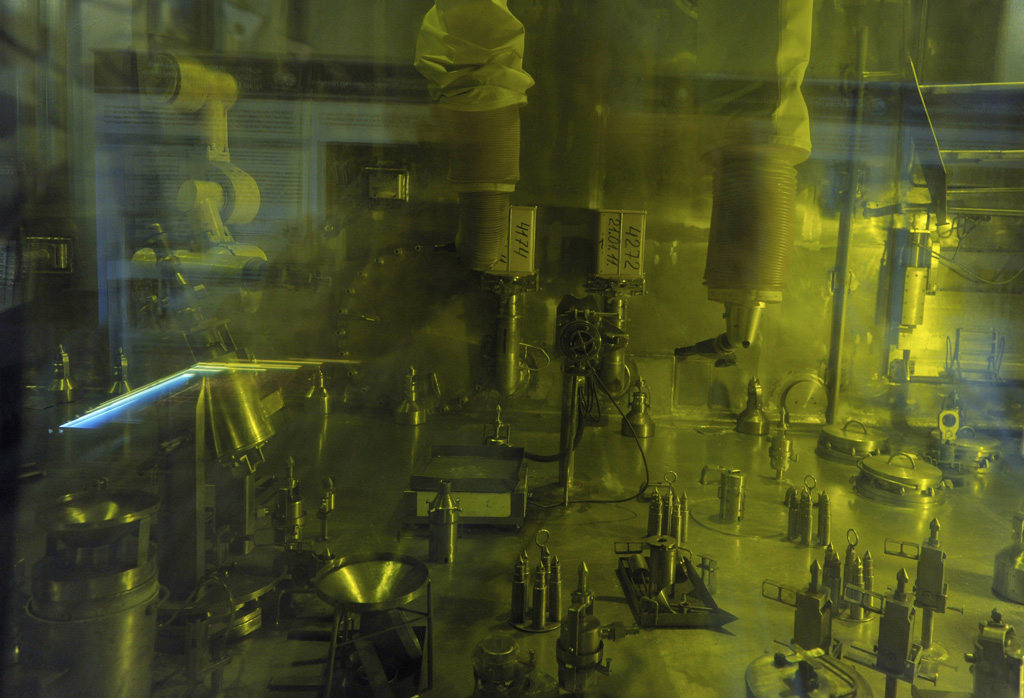
Chemical treatment of processed nuclear fuel at the institute.

Airborne ruthenium-106 traces measured in September and October 2017 by several European countries have been thought to originate from the Research Institute of Atomic Reactors.
