= Gymnasium of Dimitrovgrad =

Coordinates: 54°14′15″N 49°33′20″E

Information
- School type: Gymnasium
- Established: 1996; 30 years ago
- Teaching staff: 70
- Grades: 1-11
- Enrollment: c.1000

The Gymnasium of Dimitrovgrad is a gymnasium secondary school in Dimitrovgrad, Russia. The school has a selective admissions policy. It was founded in 1996 by upgrading the status of High School Number 13. In January 2005 there were just over 1,000 students in grades 1-11 and 70 teachers. Despite the building being poorly maintained, academic standards are high.
