= Staraya Mayna =

Staraya Mayna Старая Майна
- Urban-type settlement
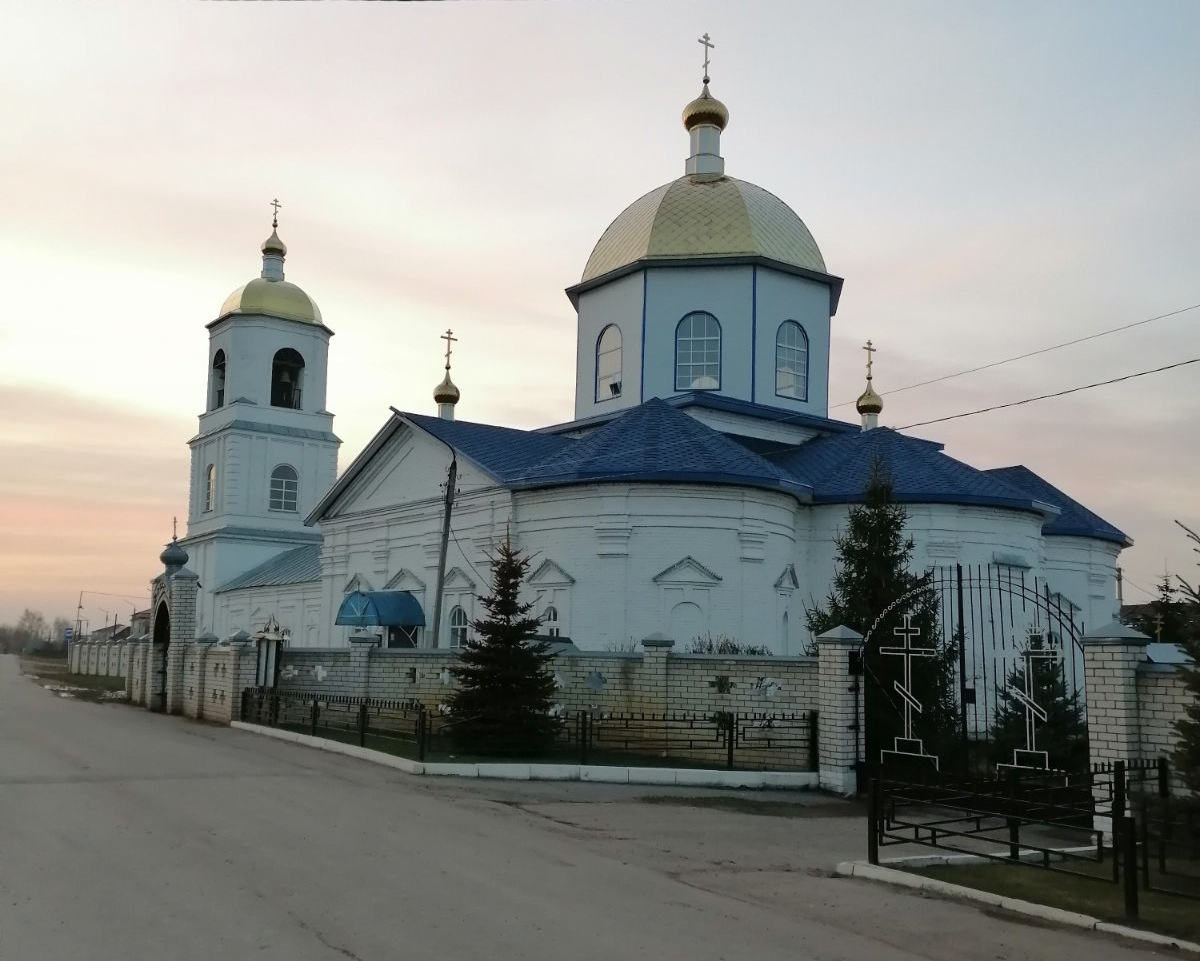
- Church of the Epiphany, St. Maina

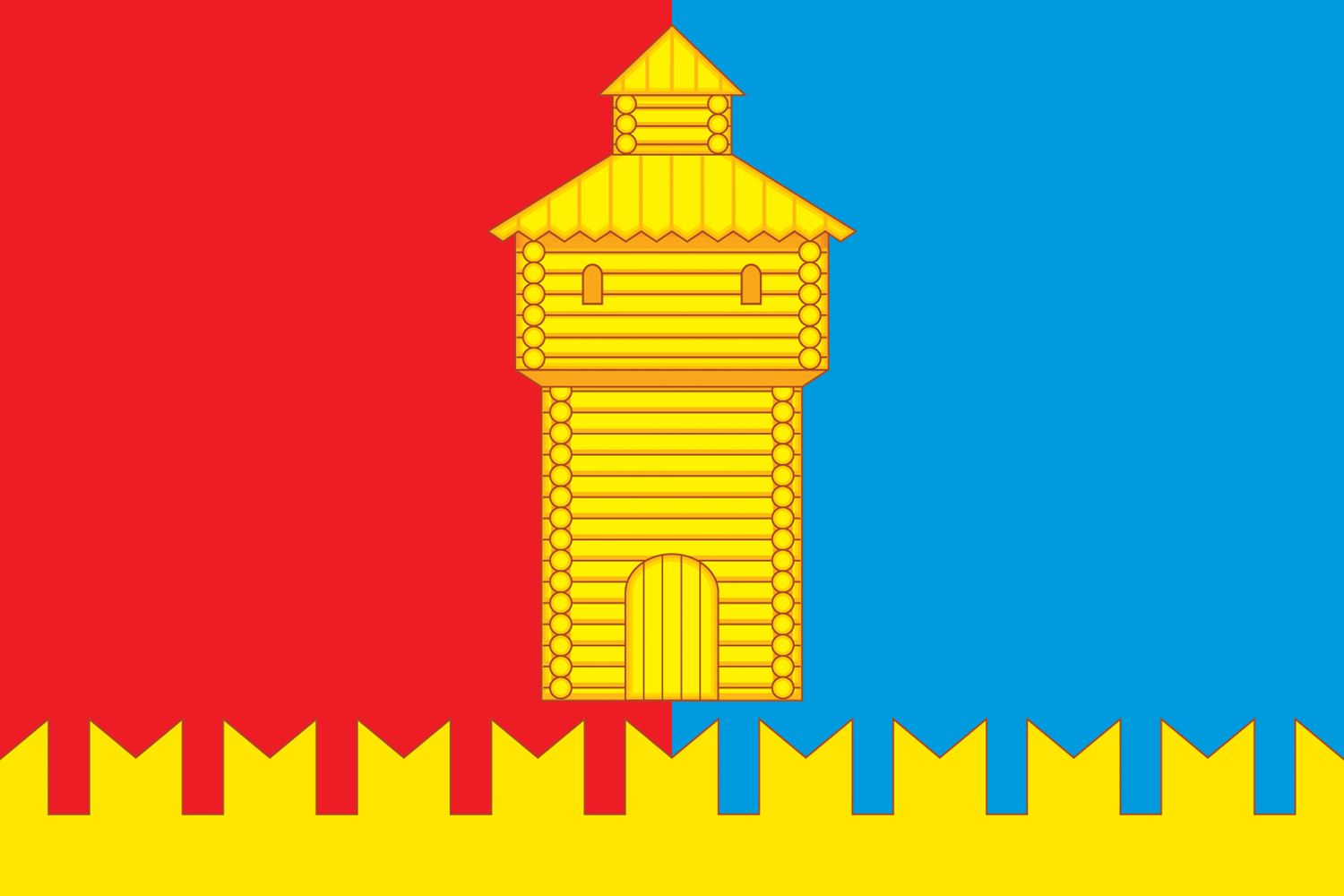
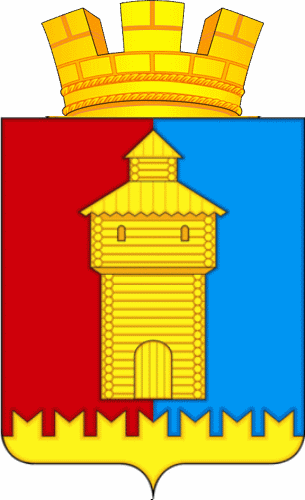
- Flag Coat of arms
- Interactive map of Staraya Mayna
- Location of Staraya Mayna Staraya Mayna (Ulyanovsk Oblast)
- Coordinates: 54.6073°N 48.9276°E
- Country: Russia
- Federal subject: Ulyanovsk Oblast
- Administrative district: Staromaynsky District
- Founded: 1670

Population (2010 Census)
  - Total: 6,521
  - Estimate (2021): 5,852 (−10.3%)
- Time zone: UTC+4 (UTC+04:00)
- Postal code: 433460
- OKTMO ID: 73642151051

Staraya Mayna (Russian: Старая Майна) is an urban locality (an urban-type settlement) in Staromaynsky District of Ulyanovsk Oblast, Russia. Population: 6,521 (2010 census); 6,988 (2002 census); 6,633 (1989 Soviet census).

== History ==
The archaeological expedition headed by Alexander Kozhevin from Ulyanovsk State University concluded that the site has been continuously inhabited since the 4th century CE. The oldest recovered objects date around 20,000 years old. Staraya Mayna existed as part of the Imenkovo culture. It was later taken by the Volga Bulgars, after that the Golden Horde and then the Kazan Khanate. In the 17th century, the first settlement under the Russian Empire was established. Gothic pendants of 3rd century, a Romantic coin of the emperor Caracalla dated 213 CE, 4th century belts were discovered in excavations.

In 2007, The Times of India reported an idol of the Hindu deity Vishnu, dated to the 7th–10th century AD, was excavated from Staraya Mayna. However, this claim has been shown to be false, as the original Russian article that reported the findings made no mention or indication of it.
