= Staraya Kulatka =

Staraya Kulatka Старая Кулатка
- Urban-type settlement
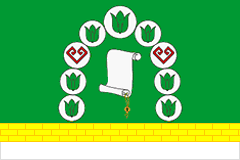
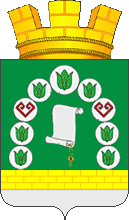
- Flag Coat of arms
- Interactive map of Staraya Kulatka
- Location of Staraya Kulatka Staraya Kulatka (Ulyanovsk Oblast)
- Coordinates: 52.7315°N 47.6211°E
- Country: Russia
- Federal subject: Ulyanovsk Oblast
- Administrative district: Starokulatkinsky District
- Founded: 18th century
- Elevation: 137 m (449 ft)

Population (2010 Census)
  - Total: 5,685
  - Estimate (2021): 4,344 (−23.6%)
- Time zone: UTC+4 (UTC+04:00)
- Postal code: 433940
- OKTMO ID: 73639151051

Staraya Kulatka (Russian: Ста́рая Кула́тка; Tatar: Иске Кулаткы) is an urban locality (an urban-type settlement) in Starokulatkinsky District of Ulyanovsk Oblast, Russia. Population: 5,685 (2010 census); 6,075 (2002 census); 5,925 (1989 Soviet census). The town and its district is predominantly ethnic Tatar.
