= Vladimir Nagornov =

- Born: November 29, 1956; Bogdashkino, Tsilninsky District, Ulyanovsk Oblast, USSR
- Education: Penza art school, Moscow state academic art Institute
- Known for: Sculpture
- Awards: Honored artist of the Russian Federation, people's artist of the Chuvash Republic

Vladimir Porfirievich Nagornov (Russian: Влади́мир Порфи́рьевич Наго́рнов, born November 29, 1956, Bogdashkino, Tsilninsky District, Ulyanovsk Oblast, USSR) — Soviet and Russian sculptor and portrait painter, Honored artist of the Russian Federation, people's artist of the Chuvash Republic.

== Biography ==
Vladimir Nagornov was born on November 29, 1956, in the village of Bogdashkino (Tsilninsky District, Ulyanovsk Oblast). In 1984 he settled in Cheboksary (most of his creations are connected with this city).
