= Maksimovka, Amur Oblast =

Maksimovka Максимовка
- Selo
- Location within Amur Oblast Location within Russia
- Coordinates: 50°09′N 128°48′E
- Country: Russia
- Region: Amur Oblast
- District: Oktyabrsky District
- Time zone: UTC+9:00

Maksimovka (Russian: Максимовка) is a rural locality (a selo) and the administrative center of Maksimovsky Selsoviet of Oktyabrsky District, Amur Oblast, Russia. The population was 332 as of 2018. There are 6 streets.

== Geography ==
Maksimovka is located 39 km southwest of Yekaterinoslavka (the district's administrative centre) by road. Kutilovo is the nearest rural locality.
