= Vladimir Kononov (politician) =

Russian politician

- Владимир Кононов
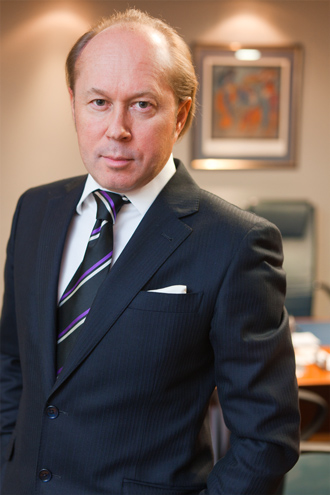

Member of the State Duma for Ulyanovsk Oblast
- Incumbent
- Assumed office 12 October 2021
- Preceded by: Alexey Kurinny
- Constituency: Ulyanovsk (No. 187)

Member of the State Duma (Party List Seat)
- In office 21 December 2011 – 12 October 2021

Personal details
- Born: 13 March 1958 (age 68) Novosibirsk, RSFSR, USSR
- Party: United Russia
- Education: Novosibirsk State Technical University

Vladimir Mikhailovich Kononov (Russian: Влади́мир Миха́йлович Ко́нонов; born March 3, 1958, Novosibirsk) is a Russian political figure and a deputy of the 6th, 7th, and 8th State Dumas.

In 1989, Kononov was granted a Candidate of Sciences degree in Philosophy. In 2016, he defended Doctor of Sciences degree in Political Sciences.

Starting from 1979, he was a member of the Komsomol organization. In 1985, while being the secretary of the Novosibirsk City Komsomol Committee, he created and headed the Youth Initiatives Fund (FMI), which became the first self-financing organization in the Soviet Union. In 1989, he founded and directed the Association for Foreign Economic Cooperation, which united more than a hundred self-financing associations in more than 50 regions of the USSR. Two years later, together with his friend Aleksandr Korolev, Kononov founded and headed the construction and investment company "KONKOR". Since 2011, he has been the deputy of the State Duma of the 6th, 7th, and 8th convocations.

In 2013, Kononov was ranked 11th in the Forbes list of wealthiest federal officials.

== Sanctions ==
He was sanctioned by the UK government in 2022 in relation to the Russo-Ukrainian War.
