= Inza, Russia =

Inza Инза
- Town
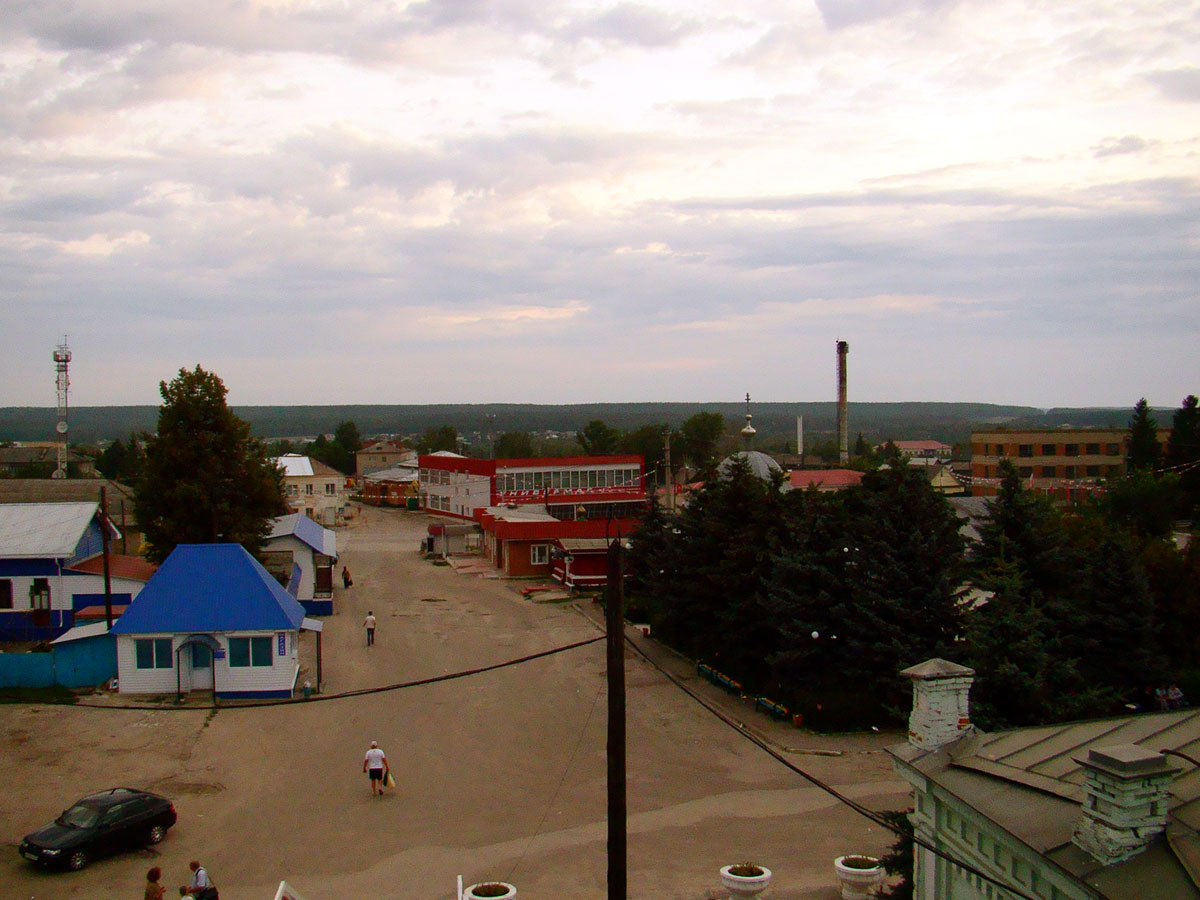
- View of Inza

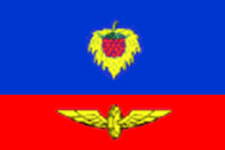
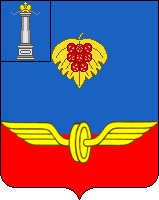
- Flag Coat of arms
- Interactive map of Inza
- Location of Inza Inza (Ulyanovsk Oblast)
- Coordinates: 53°51′N 46°21′E
- Country: Russia
- Federal subject: Ulyanovsk Oblast
- Administrative district: Inzensky District
- Town of district significanceSelsoviet: Inza
- Founded: 1897
- Town status since: 1946
- Elevation: 170 m (560 ft)

Population (2010 Census)
  - Total: 18,803
  - Estimate (2021): 16,293 (−13.3%)

Administrative status
  - Capital of: town of district significance of Inza

Municipal status
  - Municipal district: Inzensky Municipal District
  - Urban settlement: Inzenskoye Urban Settlement
  - Capital of: Inzensky Municipal District, Inzenskoye Urban Settlement
- Time zone: UTC+4 (UTC+04:00)
- Postal codes: 433030–433034, 433059
- OKTMO ID: 73610101001

Inza (Russian: И́нза) is a town and the administrative center of Inzensky District in Ulyanovsk Oblast, Russia, located on the Syuksyumka River (Sura's basin) 167 kilometers (104 mi) southwest of Ulyanovsk, the administrative center of the oblast. Population: 18,803 (2010 census); 20,288 (2002 census); 23,509 (1989 Soviet census).

== History ==
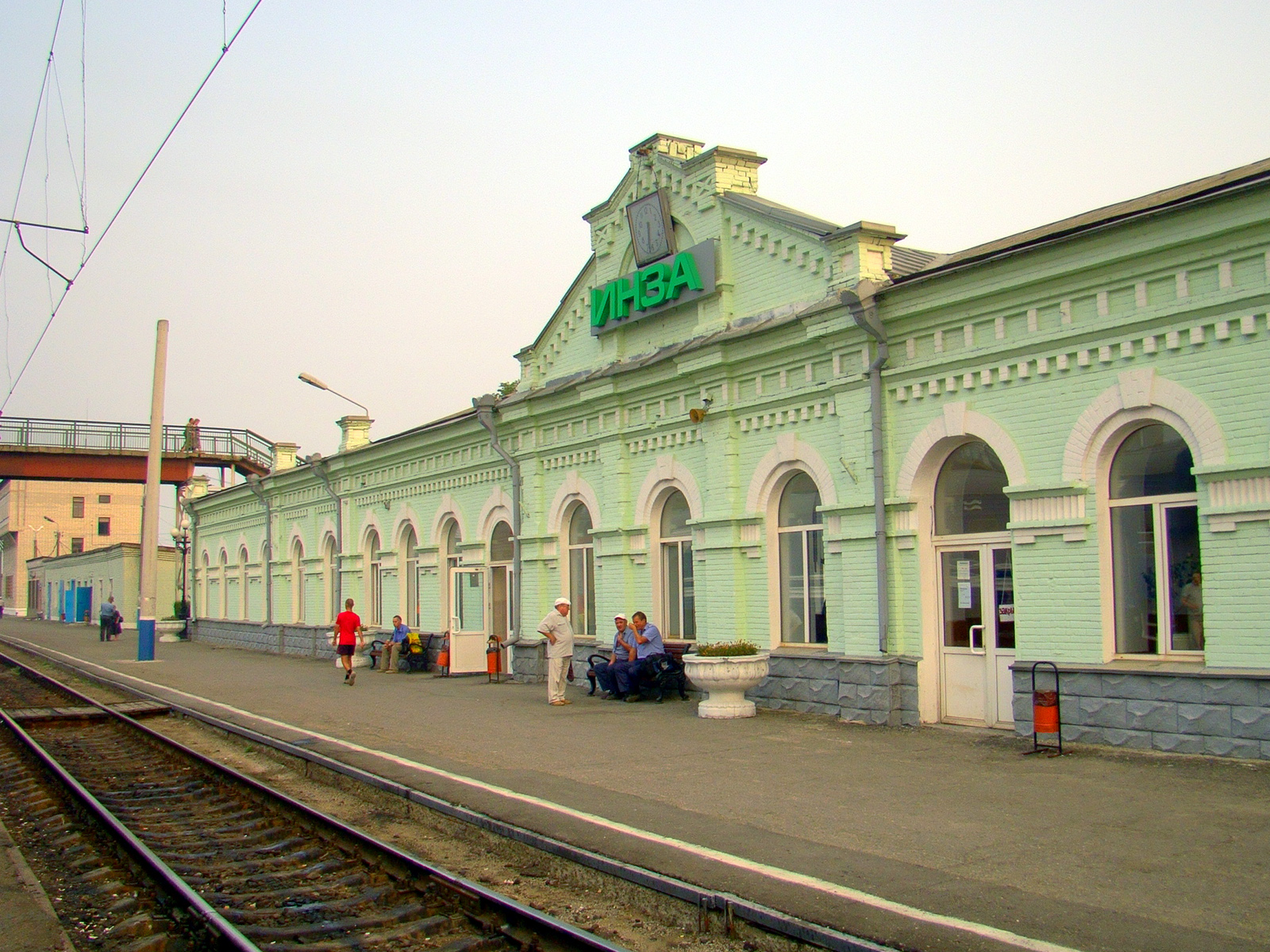
Inza railway station

It was founded in 1897 as a settlement around a railway station. Urban-type settlement status was granted to it in 1938; town status was granted in 1946.

== Administrative and municipal status ==
Within the framework of administrative divisions, Inza serves as the administrative center of Inzensky District. As an administrative division, it is, together with two rural localities, incorporated within Inzensky District as the town of district significance of Inza. As a municipal division, the town of district significance of Inza is incorporated within Inzensky Municipal District as Inzenskoye Urban Settlement.
