= Novoulyanovsk =

Town in Ulyanovsk Oblast, Russia

Novoulyanovsk Новоульяновск
- Town
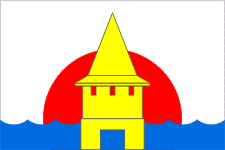
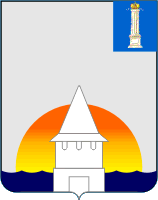
- Flag Coat of arms
- Interactive map of Novoulyanovsk
- Location of Novoulyanovsk Novoulyanovsk (Ulyanovsk Oblast)
- Coordinates: 54°10′N 48°23′E
- Country: Russia
- Federal subject: Ulyanovsk Oblast
- Founded: 1960
- Town status since: 1967
- Elevation: 100 m (330 ft)

Population (2010 Census)
  - Total: 16,033
  - Estimate (2021): 13,673 (−14.7%)

Administrative status
  - Subordinated to: town of oblast significance of Novoulyanovsk
  - Capital of: town of oblast significance of Novoulyanovsk

Municipal status
  - Urban okrug: Novoulyanovsk Urban Okrug
  - Capital of: Novoulyanovsk Urban Okrug
- Time zone: UTC+4 (UTC+04:00)
- Postal code: 433300
- OKTMO ID: 73715000001

Novoulyanovsk (Russian: Новоулья́новск) is a town in Ulyanovsk Oblast, Russia, located on the right bank of the Volga River, 19 kilometers (12 mi) south of Ulyanovsk. Population: 16,033 (2010 census); 17,595 (2002 census); 16,757 (1989 Soviet census).

== History ==
It was founded in 1960 as a settlement around a cement factory. Urban-type settlement status was granted to it in 1961 and a town status—in 1967.

== Administrative and municipal status ==
Within the framework of administrative divisions, it is, together with five rural localities, incorporated as the town of oblast significance of Novoulyanovsk—an administrative unit with the status equal to that of the districts. As a municipal division, the town of oblast significance of Novoulyanovsk is incorporated as Novoulyanovsk Urban Okrug.

== Economy ==
Today there are significant reserves of raw materials for cement production, cement factory here working Eurocement group, factories asbestos cement products and concrete structures, soft roof.
