= Dimitrovgrad, Russia =

City in Ulyanovsk Oblast, Russia

Dimitrovgrad Димитровград
- City
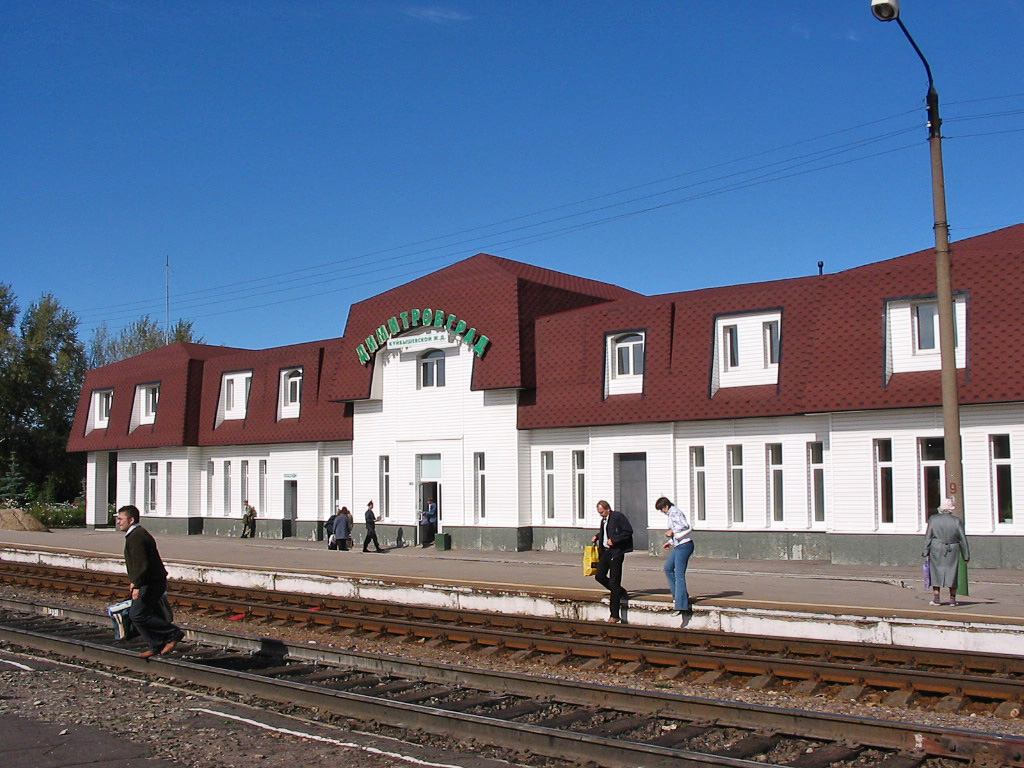
- Dimitrovgrad railway station

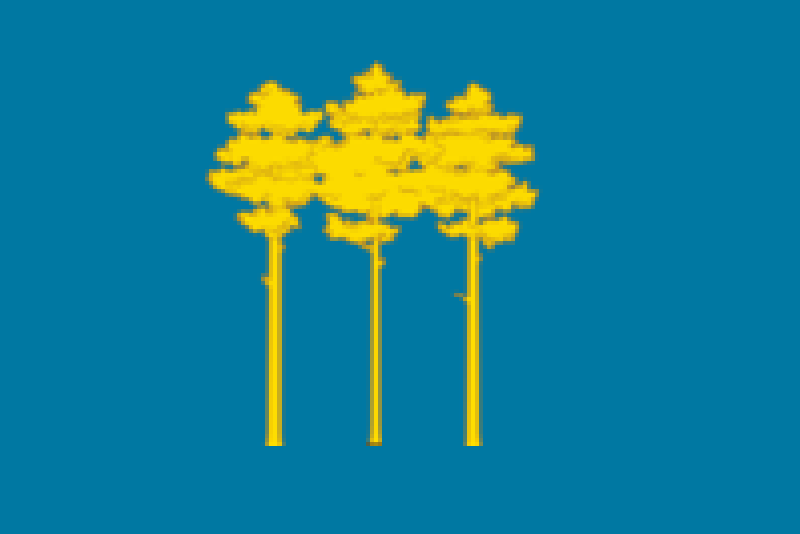
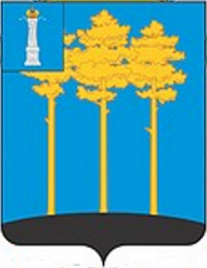
- Flag Coat of arms
- Interactive map of Dimitrovgrad
- Location of Dimitrovgrad Dimitrovgrad (Ulyanovsk Oblast)
- Coordinates: 54°11′N 49°35′E
- Country: Russia
- Federal subject: Ulyanovsk Oblast
- Founded: 1698
- City status since: 1919

Government
  - Head: Bogdan Pavlenko
- Elevation: 60 m (200 ft)

Population (2010 Census)
  - Total: 122,580
  - Estimate (2025): 108,073 (−11.8%)
  - Rank: 133rd in 2010

Administrative status
  - Subordinated to: city of oblast significance of Dimitrovgrad
  - Capital of: Melekessky District, city of oblast significance of Dimitrovgrad

Municipal status
  - Urban okrug: Dimitrovgrad Urban Okrug
  - Capital of: Dimitrovgrad Urban Okrug, Melekessky Municipal District
- Time zone: UTC+4 (UTC+04:00)
- Postal code: 4335хх
- Dialing code: +7 84235
- OKTMO ID: 73705000001
- Website: www.dimitrovgrad.ru

Dimitrovgrad (Russian: Димитровград; Russian pronunciation: [dʲɪˌmʲitrɐvˈɡrat]), formerly Melekess (Russian: Мелекесс) until 1972, is a city in Ulyanovsk Oblast, Russia. It is the administrative center of Melekessky District, although it is not within the district and is an independent city. The city is located in the Volga Region, at the confluence of the Melekesska River and the Bolshoy Cheremshan River, a tributary of the Volga River. Dimitrovgrad has a population of 122,580 (2010 census), the second-largest city in Ulyanovsk Oblast, after Ulyanovsk.

== History ==
The city was founded in 1714 as a village for workers of the local distillery. By 1897 its population had grown to 8,500, and in 1919 it was granted town status. Until 1972, the city's name was Melekess (Мелекесс), after the local Melekesska River which runs through the town. On July 15, 1972, Melekess was renamed to Dimitrovgrad, celebrating the posthumous 90th birthday of Georgi Dimitrov, the first leader of the communist People's Republic of Bulgaria.

== Administrative and municipal status ==
Within the framework of administrative divisions, Dimitrovgrad serves as the administrative center of Melekessky District, even though it is not a part of it. As an administrative division, it is incorporated separately as the city of oblast significance of Dimitrovgrad—an administrative unit with the status equal to that of the districts. As a municipal division, the city of oblast significance of Dimitrovgrad is incorporated as Dimitrovgrad Urban Okrug.

== Economy ==
The city's leading enterprise, located 6 km (4 mi) to the south-west, is the Research Institute of Atomic Reactors. Dimitrovgrad's industry also includes an auto parts manufacturer (Dimitrovgrad Automobile Parts Plant, carburetors, fuel pumps), a carpet manufacturing plant (Kovrotex), and a chemical processing equipment manufacturer (Dimitrovgradkhimmash and Zenith Khimmash).

== Education and culture ==
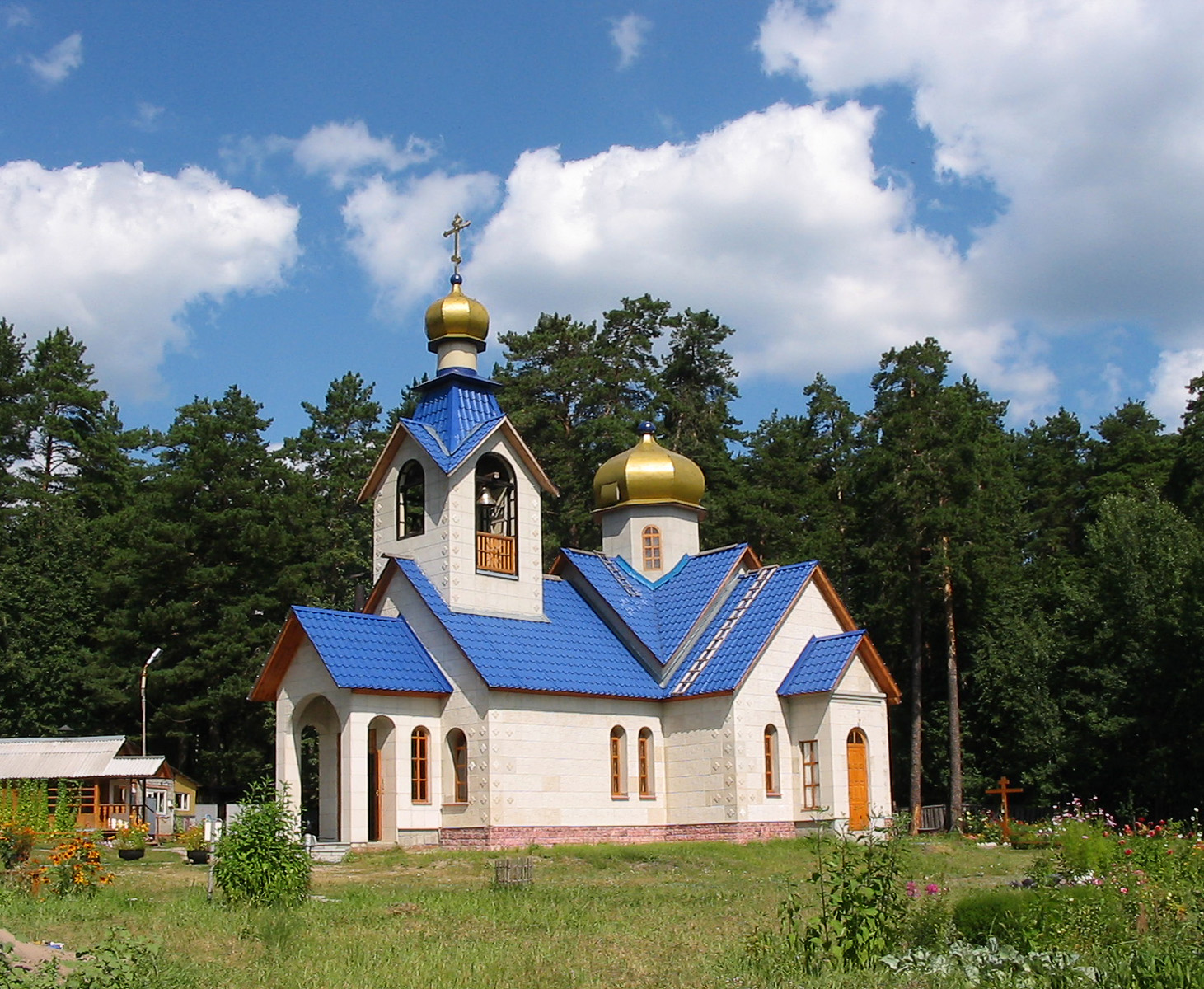
Church of St. George the Victorious in Dimitrovgrad

The city has a variety of educational institutions. It has twenty-two secondary schools, three lyceums, one gymnasium, three branches of state universities, and two branches of private higher educational institutions. The city also has the State Scientific Center of Russian Federation, Research Institute of Atomic Reactors.

There also is a drama theater in Dimitrovgrad.

== Sports ==
- The bandy team Cheremshan plays in Supreme League, the second-highest national division. At the 2016 Bandy World Championship the quarterfinal between Russia and the United States was played in Dimitrovgrad at Stadium Stroitel (Строитель), as well as the group stage match between Netherlands and Germany in Division B. Artificial ice was supposed to be constructed for the occasion, which did not happen.
- Match first qualifying round UEFA Women's Under-17 Championship 2014: Turkey-Bosnia and Herzegovina 3–0.

== Demographics ==
Population
1989	2002	2010
123,570	130,871	122,580

=== Ethnic groups ===
As of the 2010 Census: Russians - 76.2%, Tatars - 13.2%, Chuvash - 5.3%, Mordovians - 1.7%, Ukrainians - 1.0%, others - 2.5%

== Notable people ==
- Stanislav Donets
- Victor Ovcharenko
- Gevorg Arutyunyan, Russian-Armenian former football player
- Sergey Zhukov, Russian singer and lead vocalist of Ruki Vverh!

== Twin towns – sister cities ==
Dimitrovgrad is twinned with:

- Lida, Belarus
- Dimitrovgrad, Bulgaria
- Guliston, Tajikistan

== Gallery ==
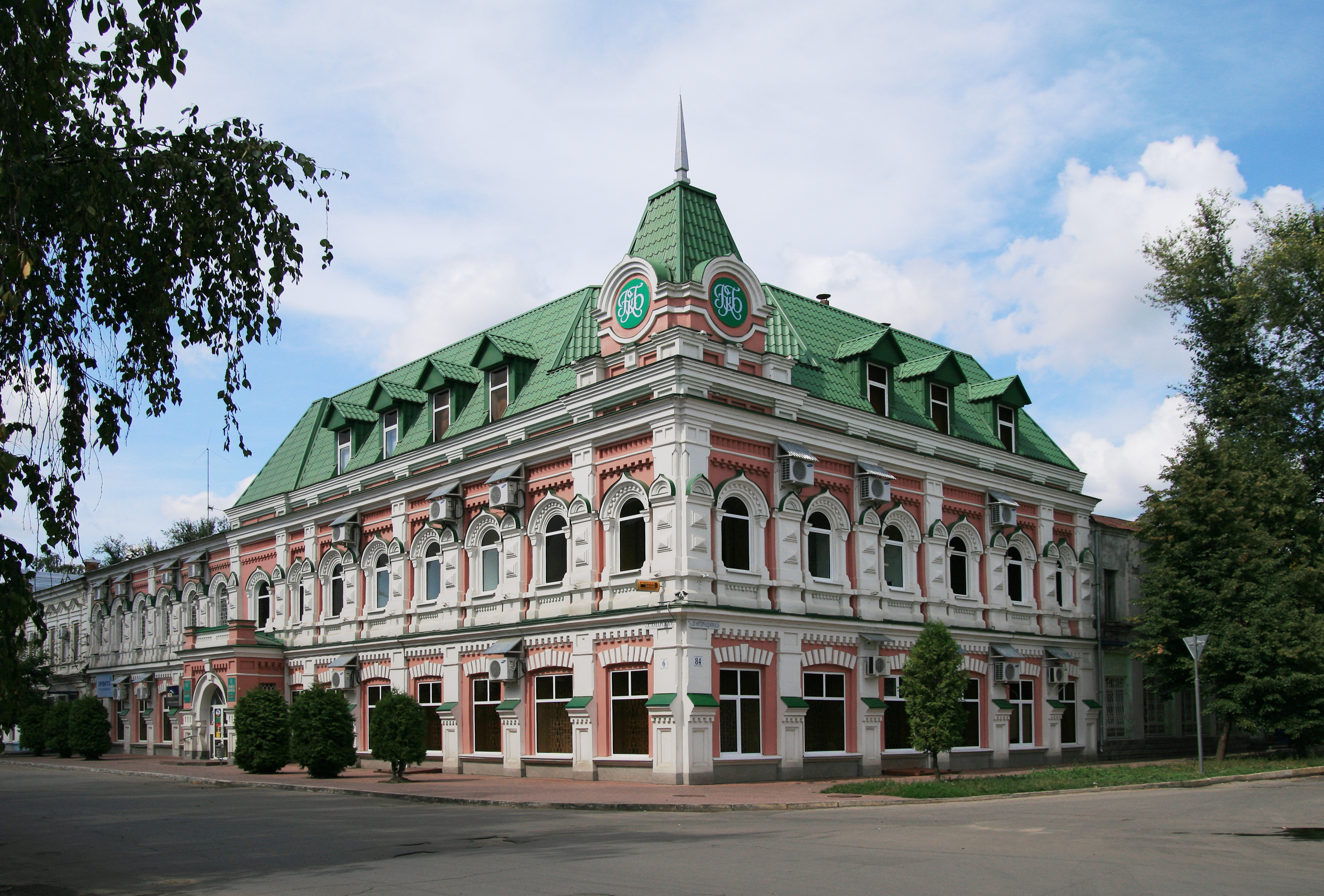
Trading house of Korobov

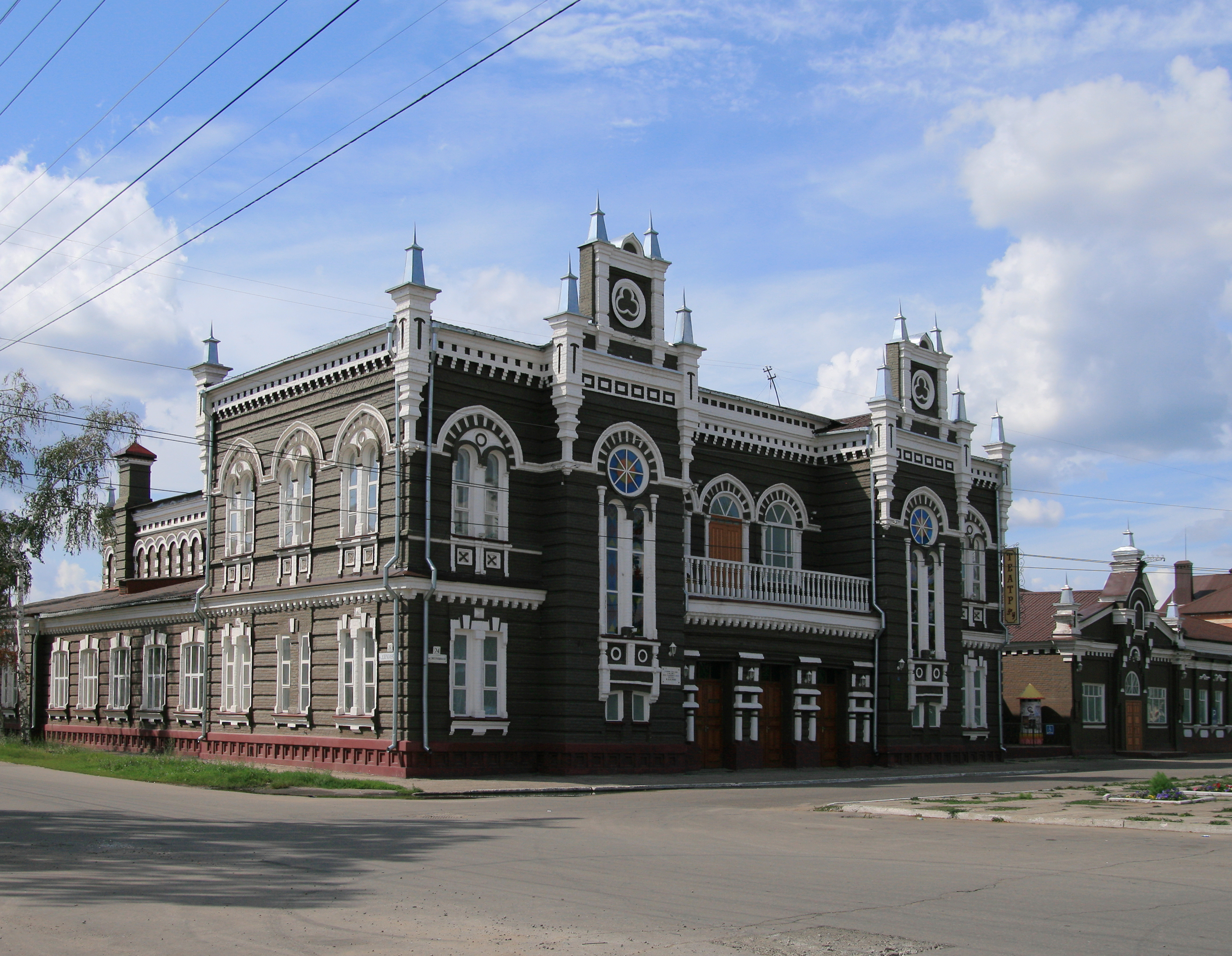
Drama Theatre. Historical monument: the place of speech of the prominent state leader Mikhail Kalinin

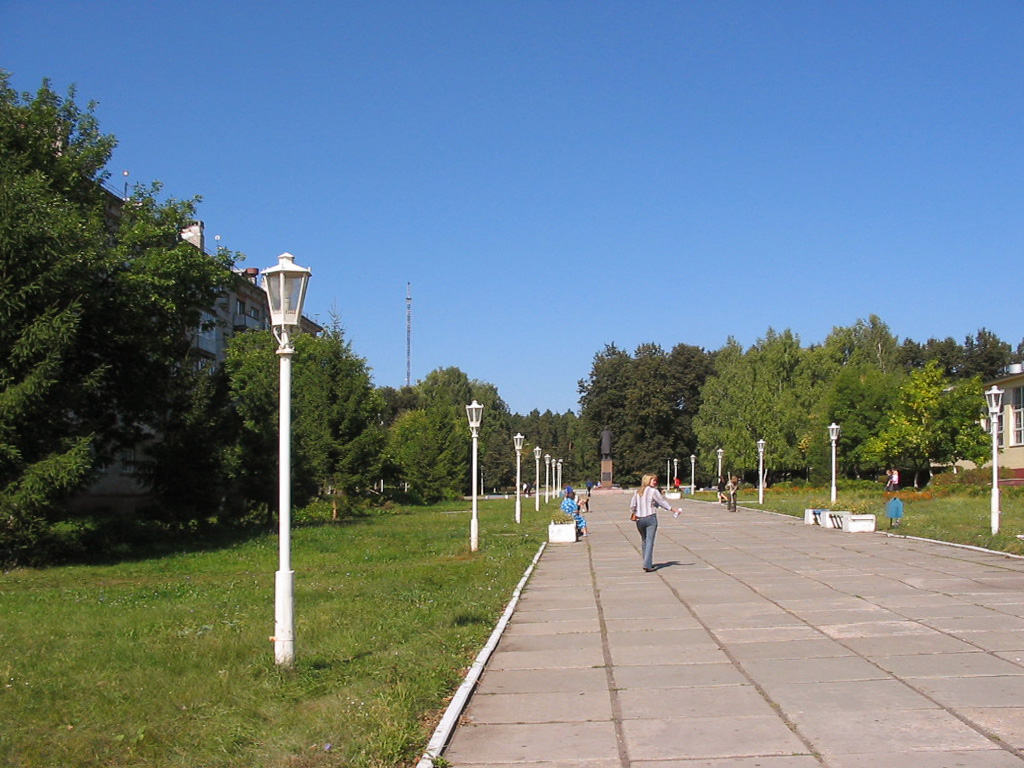
Tereshkova Street
