= Starokulatkinsky District =

Starokulatkinsky District Старокулаткинский район
- District
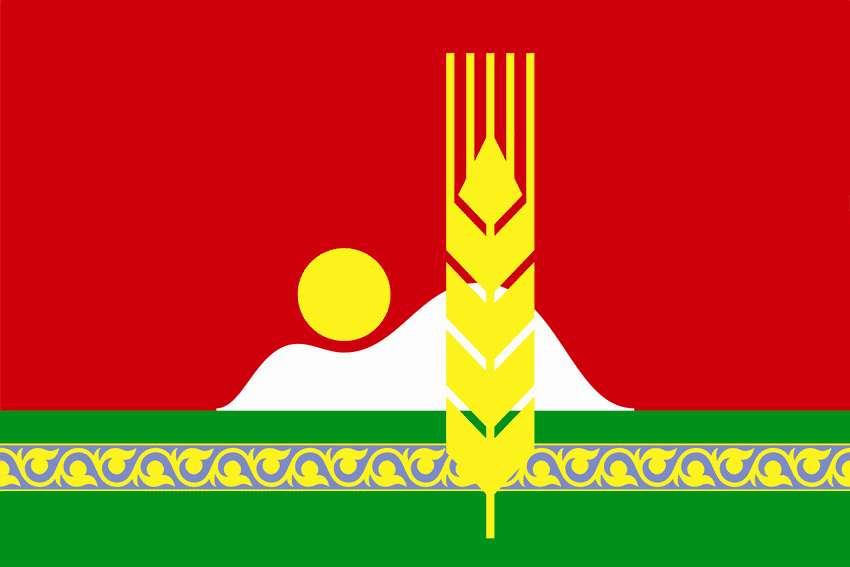
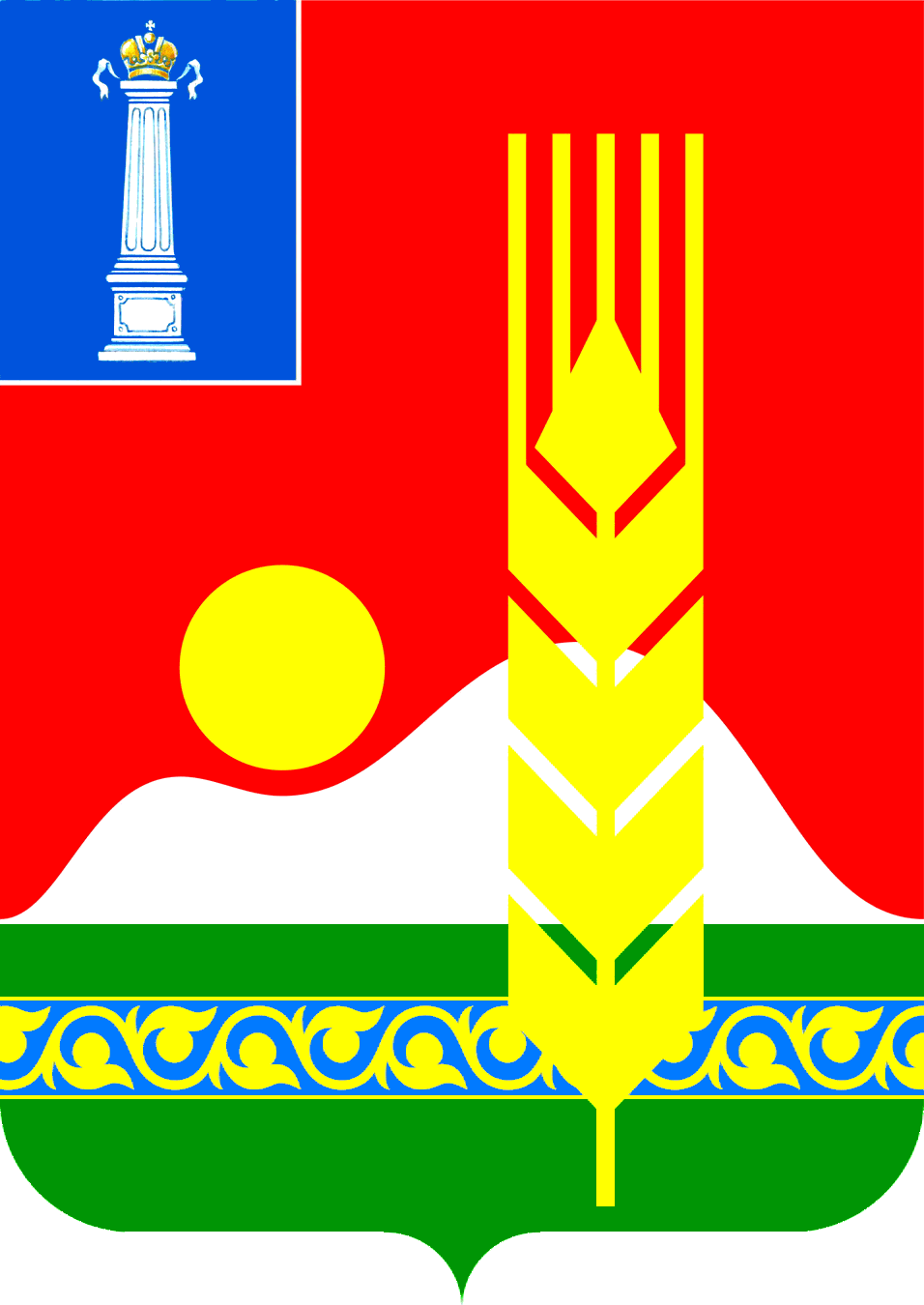
- Flag Coat of arms
- Location of Starokulatkinsky District in Ulyanovsk Oblast
- Coordinates: 52°43′N 47°37′E
- Country: Russia
- Federal subject: Ulyanovsk Oblast
- Administrative center: Staraya Kulatka

Area
  - Total: 1,178 km^{2} (455 sq mi)

Population (2010 Census)
  - Total: 14,731
  - Density: 12.51/km^{2} (32.39/sq mi)
  - Urban: 38.6%
  - Rural: 61.4%

Administrative structure
  - Administrative divisions: 1 Settlement okrugs, 4 Rural okrugs
  - Inhabited localities: 1 urban-type settlements, 22 rural localities

Municipal structure
  - Municipally incorporated as: Baryshsky Municipal District
  - Municipal divisions: 1 urban settlements, 4 rural settlements
- Time zone: UTC+4 (UTC+04:00)
- OKTMO ID: 73639000
- Website: http://stkulatka.ulregion.ru/

Starokulatkinsky District (Russian: Старокула́ткинский райо́н; Tatar: Иске Кулаткы районы) is an administrative and municipal district (raion), one of the twenty-one in Ulyanovsk Oblast, Russia. It is located in the south of the oblast. The area of the district is 1,178 square kilometers (455 sq mi). Its administrative center is the urban locality (a work settlement) of Staraya Kulatka. Population: 14,731 (2010 Census); 17,505 (2002 Census); 19,370 (1989 Soviet census). The population of Staraya Kulatka accounts for 38.6% of the district's total population.
