= Staromaynsky District =

Staromaynsky District Старомайнский район (Russian)
- District
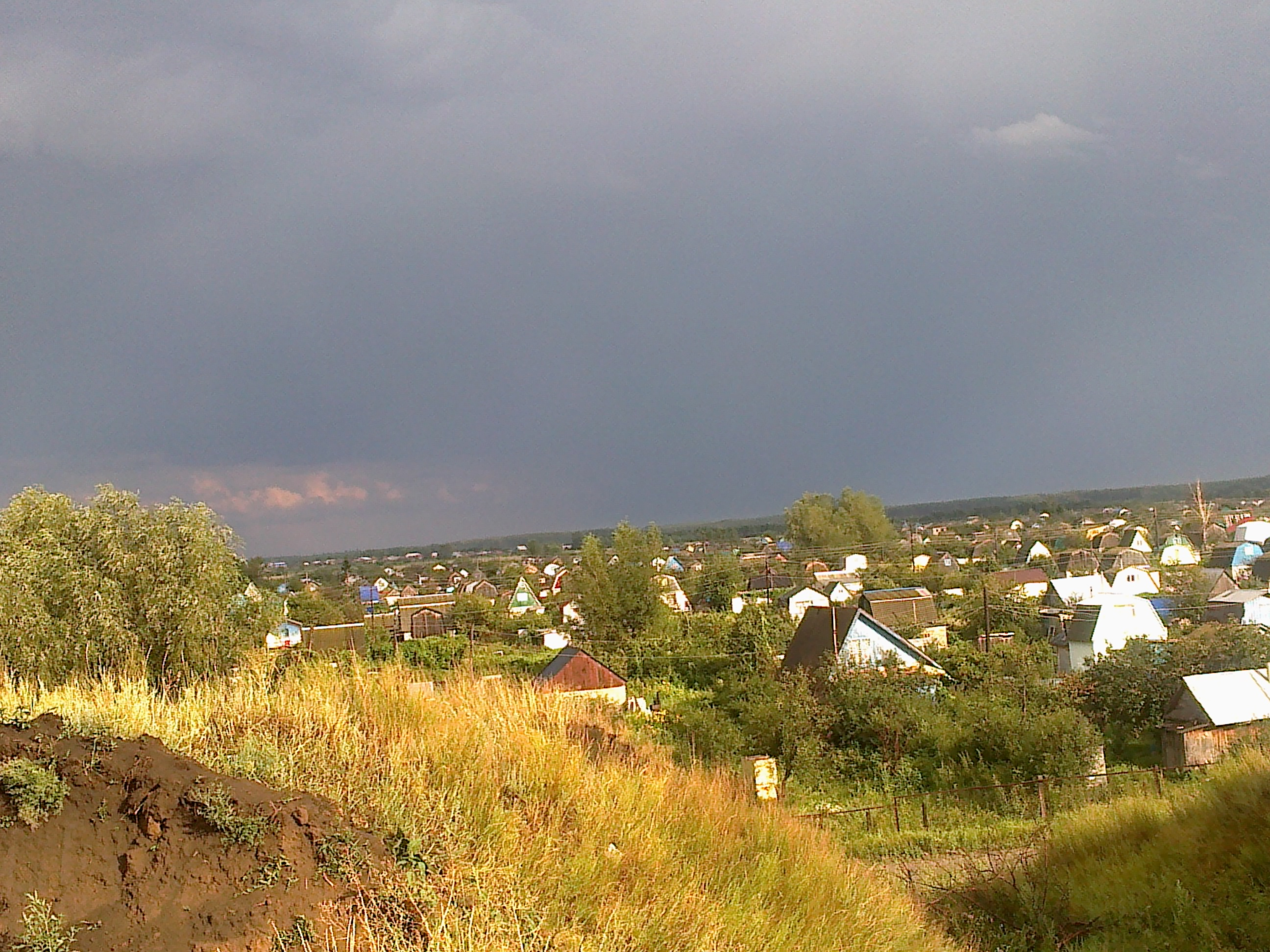
- Village in Staromaynsky District

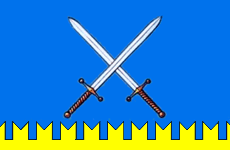
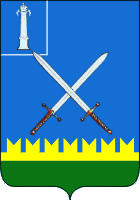
- Flag Coat of arms
- Location of Staromaynsky District in Ulyanovsk Oblast
- Coordinates: 54°36′32″N 48°55′41″E
- Country: Russia
- Federal subject: Ulyanovsk Oblast
- Established: 16 July 1928
- Administrative center: Staraya Mayna

Area
  - Total: 2,044.1 km^{2} (789.2 sq mi)

Population (2010 Census)
  - Total: 18,132
  - Density: 8.8704/km^{2} (22.974/sq mi)
  - Urban: 36.0%
  - Rural: 64.0%

Administrative structure
  - Administrative divisions: 1 Settlement okrugs, 6 Rural okrugs
  - Inhabited localities: 1 urban-type settlements, 38 rural localities

Municipal structure
  - Municipally incorporated as: Staromaynsky Municipal District
  - Municipal divisions: 1 urban settlements, 6 rural settlements
- Time zone: UTC+4 (UTC+04:00)
- OKTMO ID: 73642000
- Website: http://stmaina.ulregion.ru/

Staromaynsky District (Russian: Старома́йнский райо́н) is an administrative and municipal district (raion), one of the twenty-one in Ulyanovsk Oblast, Russia. It is located in the northeast of the oblast. The area of the district is 2,044.1 square kilometers (789.2 sq mi). Its administrative center is the urban locality (a work settlement) of Staraya Mayna. Population: 18,132 (2010 Census); 20,229 (2002 census); 20,493 (1989 Soviet census). The population of Staraya Mayna accounts for 36.0% of the district's total population.
