= Isheyevka, Ulyanovsk Oblast =

Isheyevka Ишеевка
- Urban-type settlement
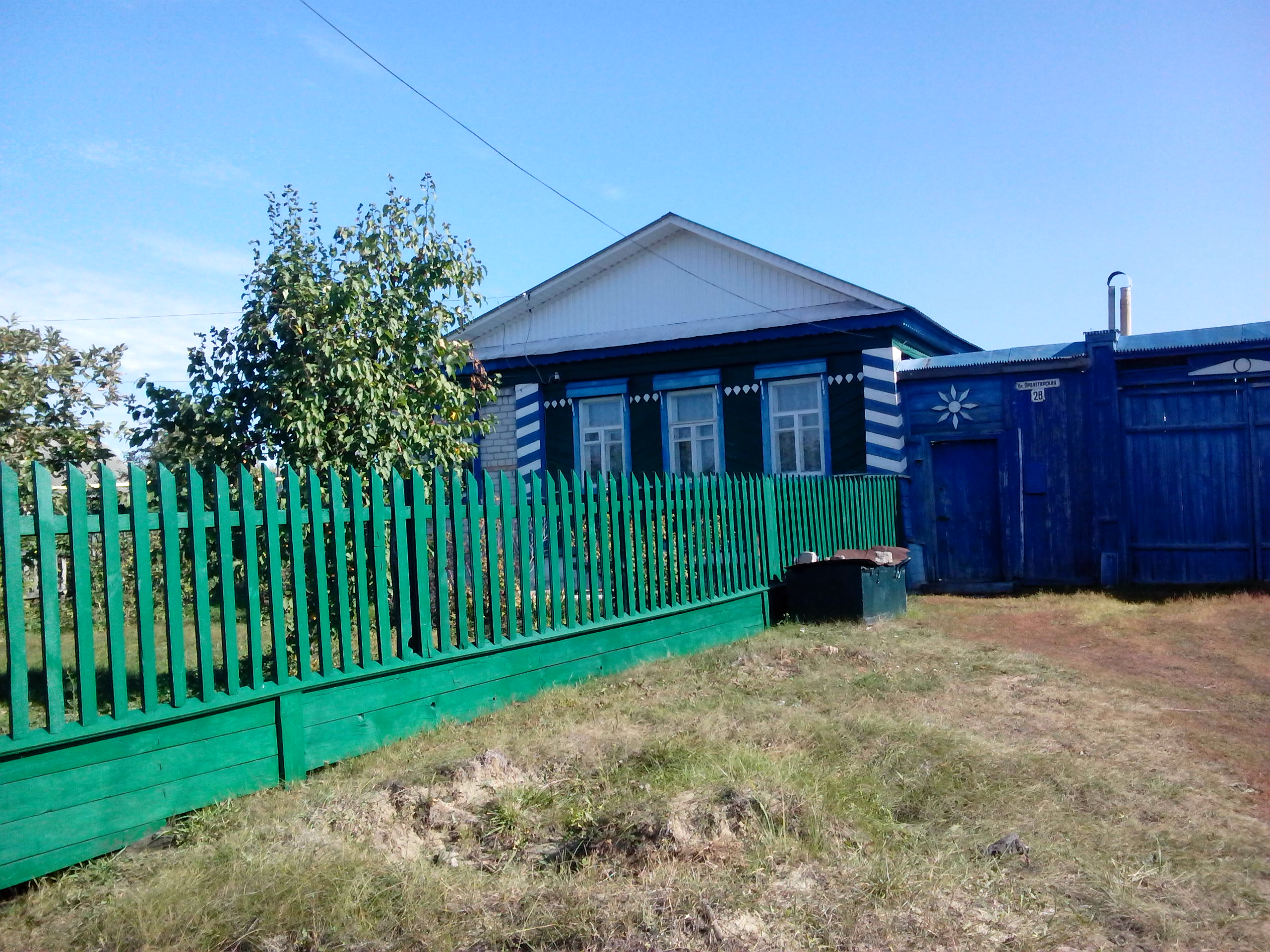

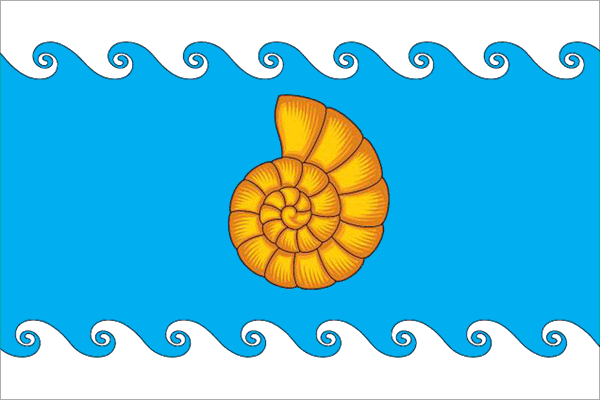
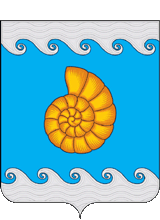
- Flag Coat of arms
- Interactive map of Isheyevka
- Location of Isheyevka Isheyevka (Ulyanovsk Oblast)
- Coordinates: 54.4251°N 48.2713°E
- Country: Russia
- Federal subject: Ulyanovsk Oblast
- Administrative district: Ulyanovsky District
- Founded: 1625
- Elevation: 93 m (305 ft)

Population (2010 Census)
  - Total: 10,383
  - Estimate (2021): 10,411 (+0.3%)
- Time zone: UTC+4 (UTC+04:00)
- Postal code: 433310
- OKTMO ID: 73652151051

Isheyevka (Russian: Ишеевка) is an urban locality (an urban-type settlement) in Ulyanovsky District of Ulyanovsk Oblast, Russia. Population: 10,383 (2010 census); 10,032 (2002 census); 9,289 (1989 Soviet census).
