= Novomalyklinsky District =

Novomalyklinsky District Новомалыклинский район (Russian)
- District
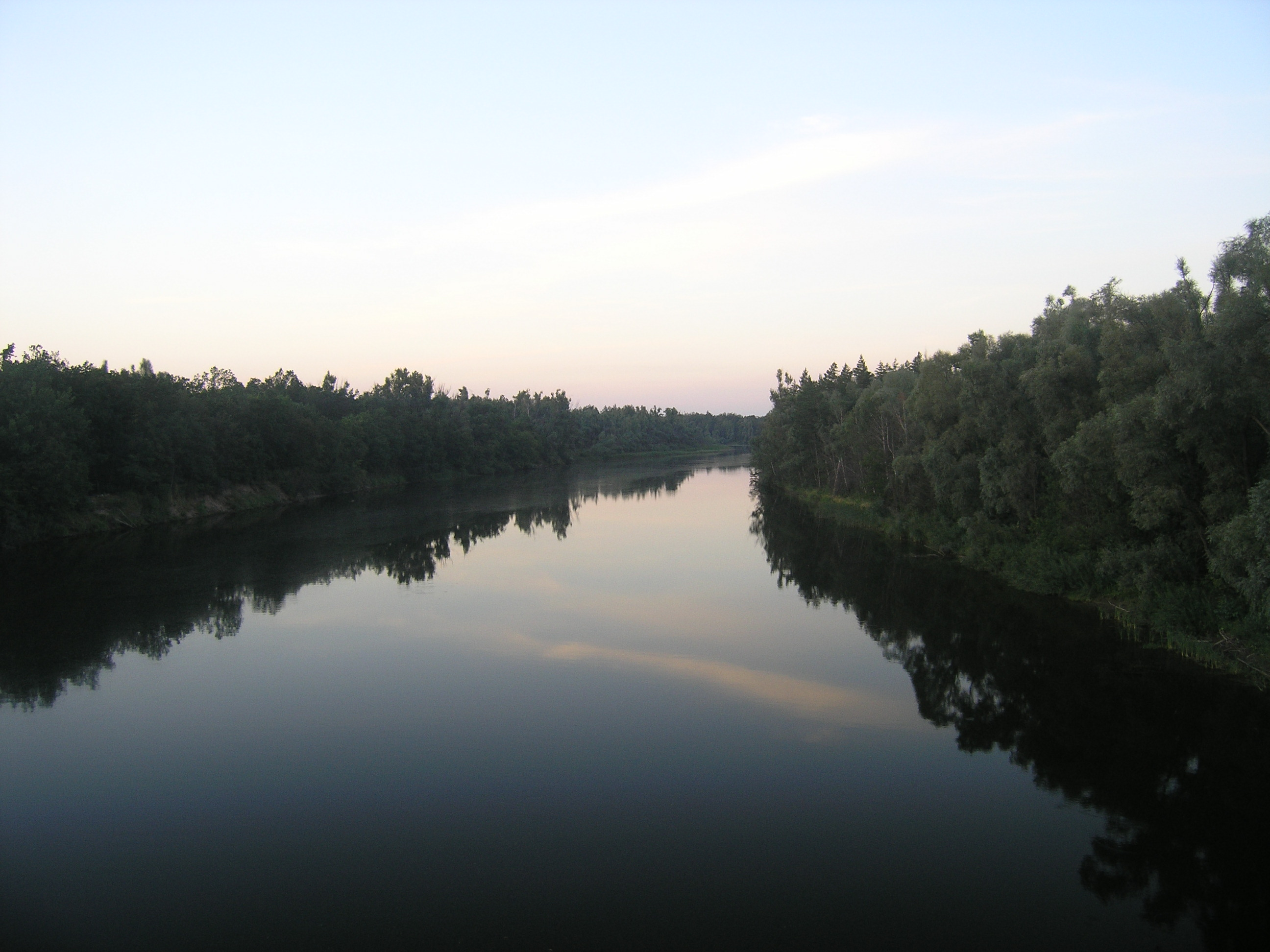
- Bolshoy Cheremshan River, Novomalyklinsky District

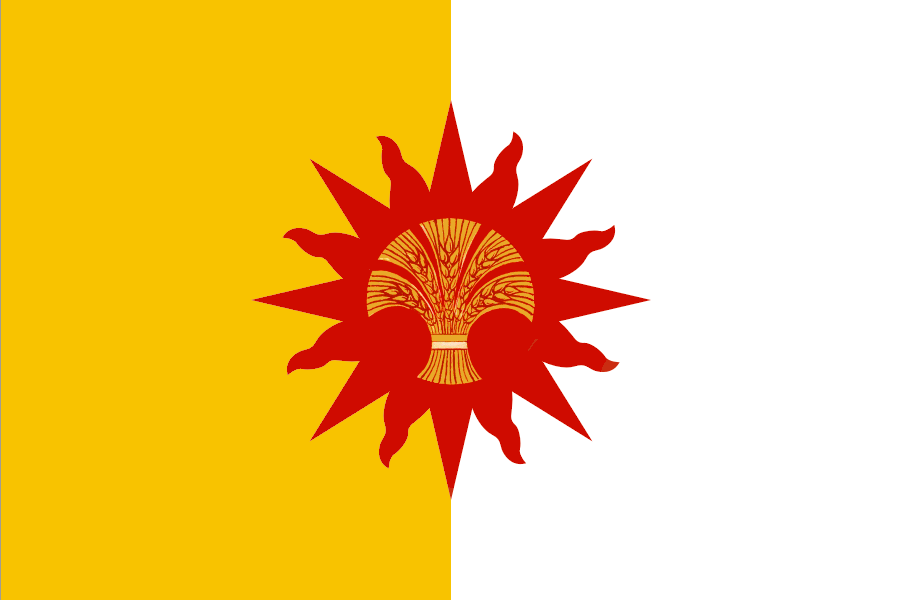
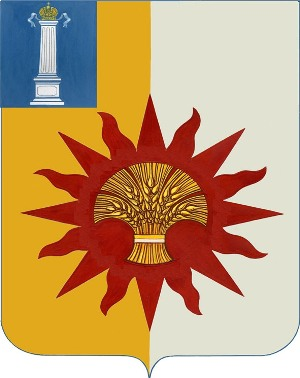
- Flag Coat of arms
- Location of Novomalyklinsky District in Ulyanovsk Oblast
- Coordinates: 54°12′00″N 49°56′24″E
- Country: Russia
- Federal subject: Ulyanovsk Oblast
- Established: 16 July 1928
- Administrative center: Novaya Malykla

Area
  - Total: 971 km^{2} (375 sq mi)

Population (2010 Census)
  - Total: 15,379
  - Density: 15.8/km^{2} (41.0/sq mi)
  - Urban: 0%
  - Rural: 100%

Administrative structure
  - Administrative divisions: 5 Rural okrugs
  - Inhabited localities: 33 rural localities

Municipal structure
  - Municipally incorporated as: Novomalyklinsky Municipal District
  - Municipal divisions: 0 urban settlements, 5 rural settlements
- Time zone: UTC+4 (UTC+04:00)
- OKTMO ID: 73627000
- Website: http://nmalykla.ulregion.ru/

Novomalyklinsky District (Russian: Новомалыкли́нский райо́н; Tatar: Яңа Малыклы районы) is an administrative and municipal district (raion), one of the twenty-one in Ulyanovsk Oblast, Russia. It is located in the northeast of the oblast. The area of the district is 971 square kilometers (375 sq mi). Its administrative center is the rural locality (a selo) of Novaya Malykla. Population: 15,379 (2010 Census); 17,167 (2002 census); 18,851 (1989 Soviet census). The population of Novaya Malykla accounts for 21.3% of the district's total population.
