= Tsilninsky District =

Tsilninsky District Цильнинский район (Russian)
- District
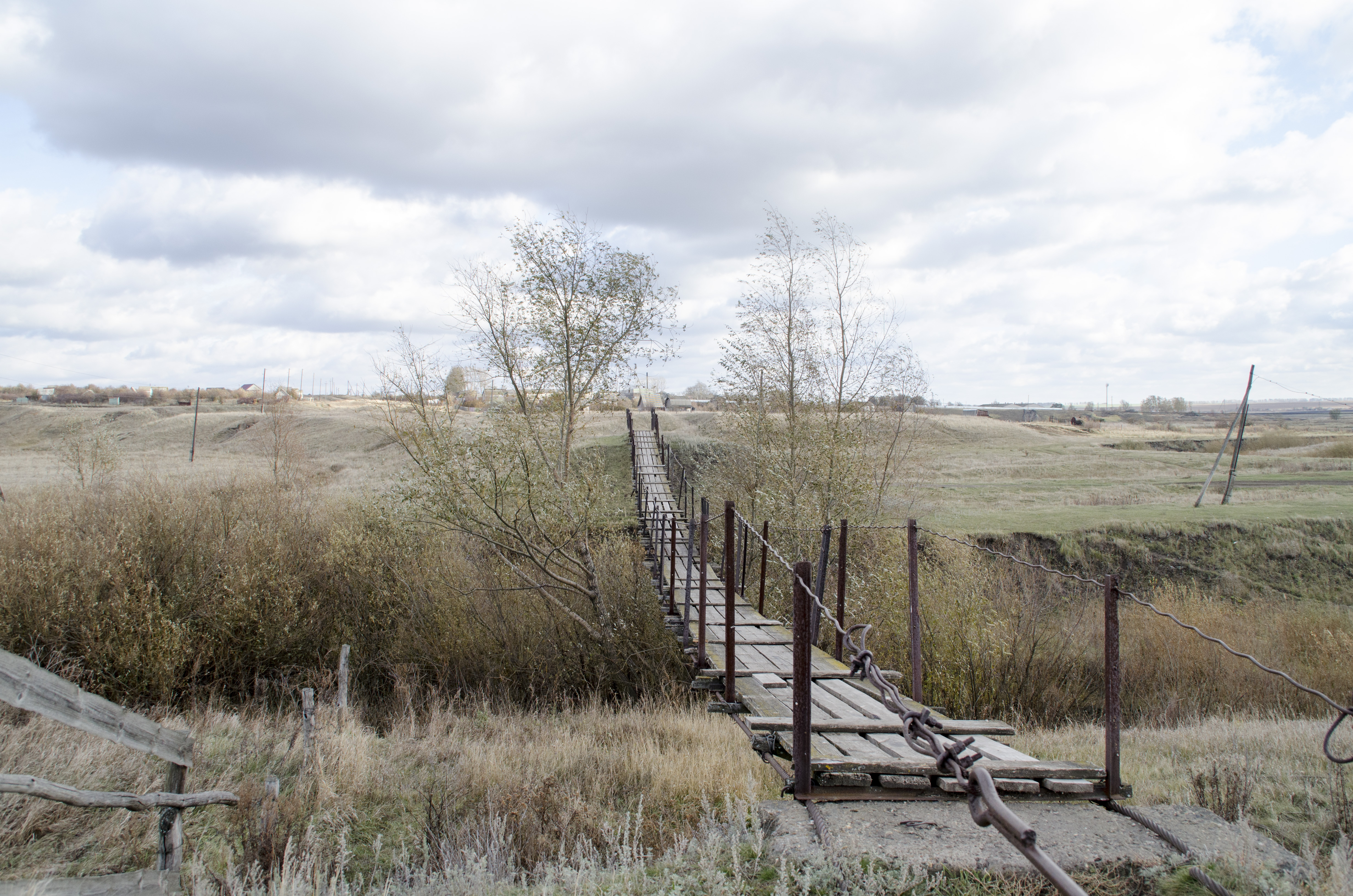
- Suspended bridge, Tsilninsky District

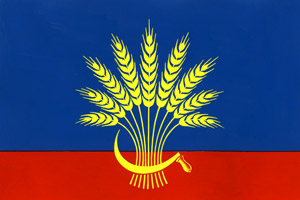
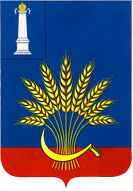
- Flag Coat of arms
- Location of Tsilninsky District in Ulyanovsk Oblast
- Coordinates: 54°31′N 47°58′E
- Country: Russia
- Federal subject: Ulyanovsk Oblast
- Established: 3 November 1965
- Administrative center: Bolshoye Nagatkino

Area
  - Total: 1,293 km^{2} (499 sq mi)

Population (2010 Census)
  - Total: 27,543
  - Density: 21.30/km^{2} (55.17/sq mi)
  - Urban: 15.0%
  - Rural: 85.0%

Administrative structure
  - Administrative divisions: 1 Settlement okrugs, 7 Rural okrugs
  - Inhabited localities: 1 urban-type settlements, 54 rural localities

Municipal structure
  - Municipally incorporated as: Tsilninsky Municipal District
  - Municipal divisions: 1 urban settlements, 7 rural settlements
- Time zone: UTC+4 (UTC+04:00)
- OKTMO ID: 73654000
- Website: http://cilna.ru/

Tsilninsky District (Russian: Ци́льнинский райо́н) is an administrative and municipal district (raion), one of the twenty-one in Ulyanovsk Oblast, Russia. It is located in the north of the oblast. The area of the district is 1,293 square kilometers (499 sq mi). Its administrative center is the rural locality (a selo) of Bolshoye Nagatkino. Population: 27,543 (2010 Census); 28,628 (2002 census); 31,496 (1989 Soviet census). The population of Bolshoye Nagatkino accounts for 19.8% of the district's total population.
