= Inzensky District =

Inzensky District Инзенский район (Russian)
- District
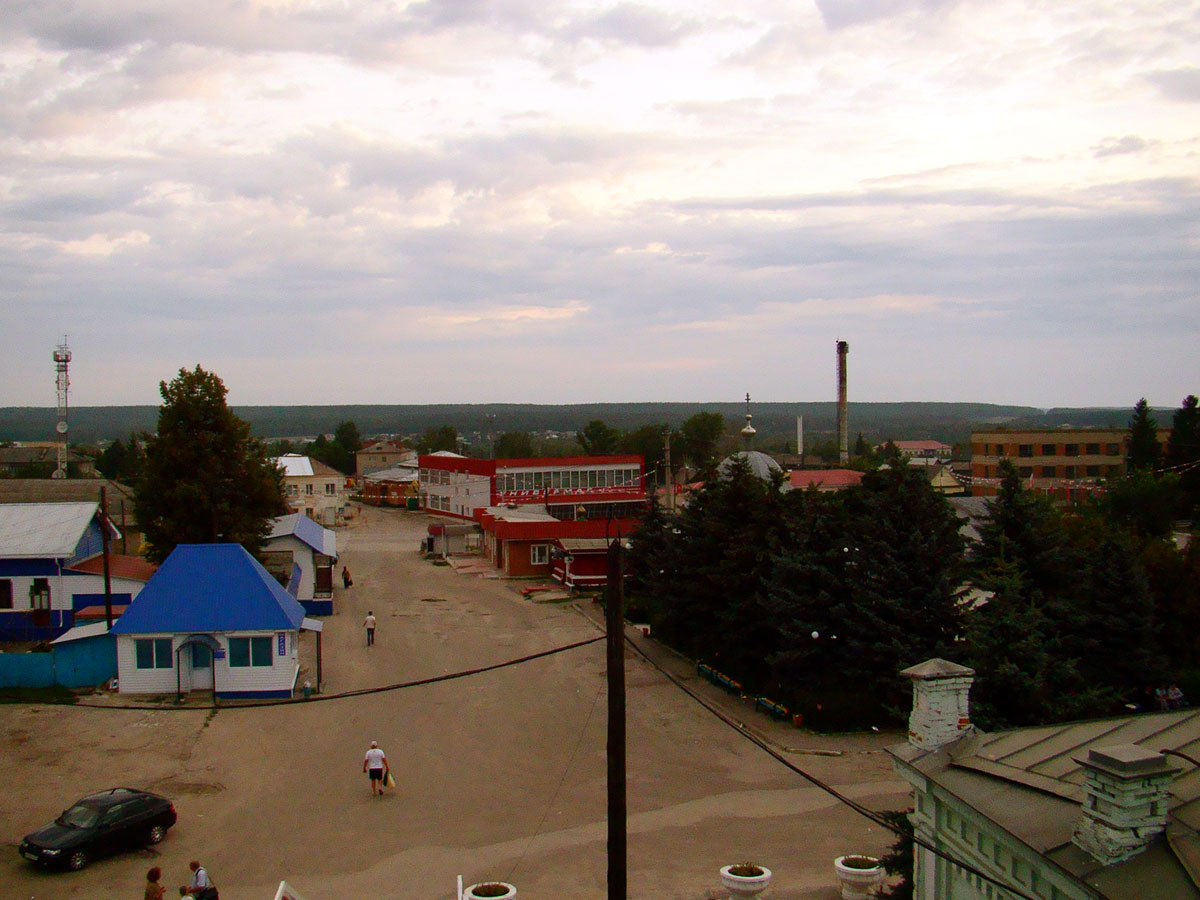
- Inza town, Inzensky District

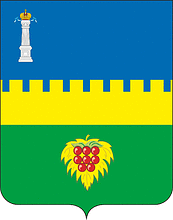
- Flag Coat of arms
- Location of Inzensky District in Ulyanovsk Oblast
- Coordinates: 53°51′N 46°21′E
- Country: Russia
- Federal subject: Ulyanovsk Oblast
- Administrative center: Inza

Area
  - Total: 2,020.2 km^{2} (780.0 sq mi)

Population (2010 Census)
  - Total: 33,877
  - Density: 16.769/km^{2} (43.432/sq mi)
  - Urban: 62.7%
  - Rural: 37.3%

Administrative structure
  - Administrative divisions: 1 Towns of district significance, 1 Settlement okrugs, 6 Rural okrugs
  - Inhabited localities: 1 cities/towns, 1 urban-type settlements, 65 rural localities

Municipal structure
  - Municipally incorporated as: Inzensky Municipal District
  - Municipal divisions: 2 urban settlements, 6 rural settlements
- Time zone: UTC+4 (UTC+04:00)
- OKTMO ID: 73610000
- Website: http://inza.ulregion.ru/

Inzensky District (Russian: И́нзенский райо́н) is an administrative and municipal district (raion), one of the twenty-one in Ulyanovsk Oblast, Russia. It is located in the west of the oblast.

== Demographics ==
The area of the district is 2,020.2 square kilometers (780.0 sq mi) Its administrative center is the town of Inza. Population: 33,877 (2010 Census); 40,083 (2002 census); 59,539 (1989 Soviet census). The population of Inza accounts for 55.5% of the district's total population.
