= Ulyanovsky District, Ulyanovsk Oblast =

Ulyanovsky District Ульяновский район (Russian)
- District
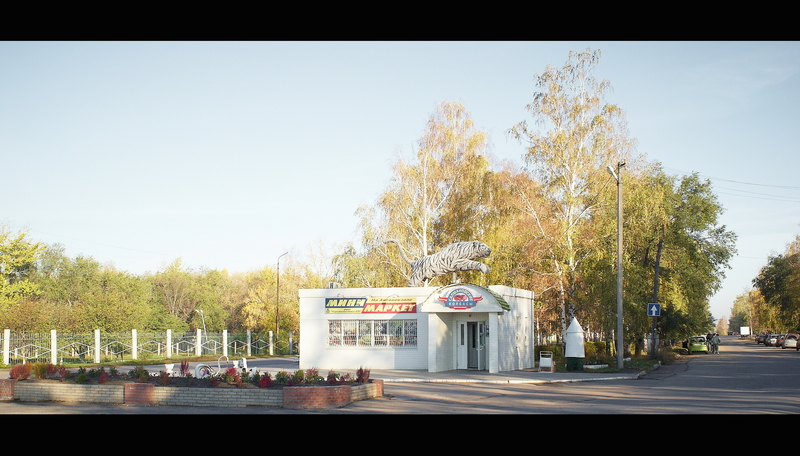
- Settlement Isheevka, Ulyanovsky District

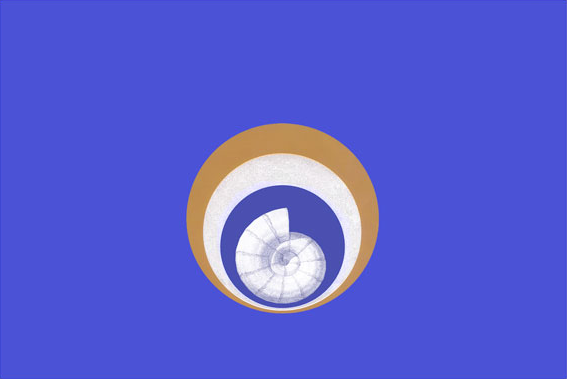
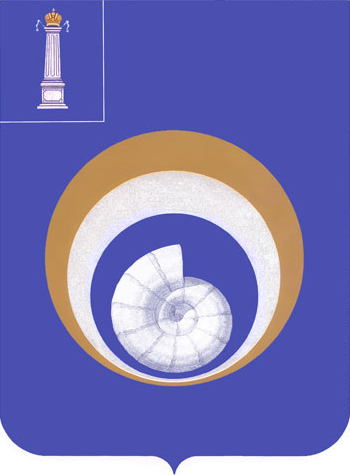
- Flag Coat of arms
- Location of Ulyanovsky District in Ulyanovsk Oblast
- Coordinates: 54°25′54″N 48°15′30″E
- Country: Russia
- Federal subject: Ulyanovsk Oblast
- Established: 16 July 1928
- Administrative center: Isheyevka

Area
  - Total: 1,273 km^{2} (492 sq mi)

Population (2010 Census)
  - Total: 36,669
  - Density: 28.81/km^{2} (74.61/sq mi)
  - Urban: 28.3%
  - Rural: 71.7%

Administrative structure
  - Administrative divisions: 1 Settlement okrugs, 5 Rural okrugs
  - Inhabited localities: 1 urban-type settlements, 53 rural localities

Municipal structure
  - Municipally incorporated as: Ulyanovsky Municipal District
  - Municipal divisions: 1 urban settlements, 5 rural settlements
- Time zone: UTC+4 (UTC+04:00)
- OKTMO ID: 73652000
- Website: http://ulraion.ru/

Ulyanovsky District (Russian: Улья́новский райо́н) is an administrative and municipal district (raion), one of the twenty-one in Ulyanovsk Oblast, Russia. It is located in the north of the oblast. The area of the district is 1,273 square kilometers (492 sq mi). Its administrative center is the urban locality (a work settlement) of Isheyevka. Population: 36,669 (2010 Census); 58,366 (2002 census); 54,919 (1989 Soviet census). The population of Isheyevka accounts for 28.3% of the district's total population.
