= Berezovo =

Berezovo (Russian: Березово) or Beryozovo (Берёзово) is the name of several inhabited localities in Russia. The name is derived from the Russian береза (bereza), "birch."

== Modern localities ==
=== Altai Krai ===
As of 2012, two rural localities in Altai Krai bear this name:

- Berezovo, Soloneshensky District, Altai Krai, a selo in Lyutayevsky Selsoviet of Soloneshensky District; 51°57′N 84°26′E
- Berezovo, Soltonsky District, Altai Krai, a selo in Soltonsky Selsoviet of Soltonsky District; 52°53′N 86°19′E

=== Arkhangelsk Oblast ===
As of 2012, one rural locality in Arkhangelsk Oblast bears this name:

- Berezovo, Arkhangelsk Oblast, a village in Shonoshsky Selsoviet of Velsky District

=== Belgorod Oblast ===
As of 2012, one rural locality in Belgorod Oblast bears this name:

- Berezovo, Belgorod Oblast, a khutor in Belgorodsky District

=== Chelyabinsk Oblast ===
As of 2012, one rural locality in Chelyabinsk Oblast bears this name:

- Berezovo, Chelyabinsk Oblast, a settlement in Berezovsky Selsoviet of Krasnoarmeysky District

=== Ivanovo Oblast ===
As of 2012, one rural locality in Ivanovo Oblast bears this name:

- Berezovo, Ivanovo Oblast, a village in Vichugsky District

=== Kaliningrad Oblast ===
As of 2012, one rural locality in Kaliningrad Oblast bears this name:

- Berezovo, Kaliningrad Oblast, a settlement under the administrative jurisdiction of the town of district significance of Pravdinsk in Pravdinsky District

=== Kaluga Oblast ===
As of 2012, one rural locality in Kaluga Oblast bears this name:

- Berezovo, Kaluga Oblast, a village in Spas-Demensky District

=== Kemerovo Oblast ===
As of 2012, three rural localities in Kemerovo Oblast bear this name:

- Berezovo, Kemerovsky District, Kemerovo Oblast, a selo in Berezovskaya Rural Territory of Kemerovsky District; 55°14′N 86°15′E
- Berezovo, Novokuznetsky District, Kemerovo Oblast, a selo in Kostenkovskaya Rural Territory of Novokuznetsky District; 53°42′N 86°48′E
- Berezovo, Promyshlennovsky District, Kemerovo Oblast, a selo in Padunskaya Rural Territory of Promyshlennovsky District; 55°10′N 85°3′E

=== Khanty-Mansi Autonomous Okrug ===
As of 2012, one urban locality in Khanty-Mansi Autonomous Okrug bears this name:

- Beryozovo, Khanty-Mansi Autonomous Okrug, an urban-type settlement in Beryozovsky District

=== Kirov Oblast ===
As of 2012, one rural locality in Kirov Oblast bears this name:

- Berezovo, Kirov Oblast, a selo in Ivanovsky Rural Okrug of Yuryansky District; 59°5′N 49°33′E

=== Kostroma Oblast ===
As of 2012, one rural locality in Kostroma Oblast bears this name:

- Berezovo, Kostroma Oblast, a village in Orekhovskoye Settlement of Galichsky District; 58°26′N 41°53′E

=== Kurgan Oblast ===
As of 2012, three rural localities in Kurgan Oblast bear this name:

- Berezovo, Belozersky District, Kurgan Oblast, a village in Bayaraksky Selsoviet of Belozersky District; 56°2′N 65°29′E
- Berezovo, Kurtamyshsky District, Kurgan Oblast, a selo in Bolsheberezovsky Selsoviet of Kurtamyshsky District; 54°40′N 64°29′E
- Berezovo, Shumikhinsky District, Kurgan Oblast, a selo in Berezovsky Selsoviet of Shumikhinsky District; 55°11′N 63°4′E

=== Kursk Oblast ===
As of 2012, one rural locality in Kursk Oblast bears this name:

- Berezovo, Kursk Oblast, a selo in Sosnovsky Selsoviet of Gorshechensky District

=== Leningrad Oblast ===
As of 2012, one rural locality in Leningrad Oblast bears this name:

- Berezovo, Leningrad Oblast, a settlement in Sevastyanovskoye Settlement Municipal Formation of Priozersky District; 61°10′N 29°53′E

=== Mari El Republic ===
As of 2012, two rural localities in the Mari El Republic bear this name:

- Berezovo, Mikryakovsky Rural Okrug, Gornomariysky District, Mari El Republic, a village in Mikryakovsky Rural Okrug of Gornomariysky District
- Berezovo, Paygusovsky Rural Okrug, Gornomariysky District, Mari El Republic, a village in Paygusovsky Rural Okrug of Gornomariysky District

=== Republic of Mordovia ===
As of 2012, one rural locality in the Republic of Mordovia bears this name:

- Berezovo, Republic of Mordovia, a settlement in Krasnoyarsky Selsoviet of Tengushevsky District; 54°45′N 42°52′E

=== Nizhny Novgorod Oblast ===
As of 2012, one rural locality in Nizhny Novgorod Oblast bears this name:

- Berezovo, Nizhny Novgorod Oblast, a village in Loyminsky Selsoviet of Sokolsky District

=== Novosibirsk Oblast ===
As of 2012, one rural locality in Novosibirsk Oblast bears this name:

- Berezovo, Novosibirsk Oblast, a selo in Maslyaninsky District

=== Omsk Oblast ===
As of 2012, one rural locality in Omsk Oblast bears this name:

- Berezovo, Omsk Oblast, a village in Kiterminsky Rural Okrug of Krutinsky District

=== Perm Krai ===
As of 2012, three rural localities in Perm Krai bear this name:

- Berezovo, Cherdynsky District, Perm Krai, a village in Cherdynsky District
- Berezovo, Kungursky District, Perm Krai, a village in Kungursky District
- Berezovo, Ochyorsky District, Perm Krai, a village in Ochyorsky District

=== Pskov Oblast ===
As of 2012, two rural localities in Pskov Oblast bear this name:

- Berezovo, Dedovichsky District, Pskov Oblast, a village in Dedovichsky District
- Berezovo, Nevelsky District, Pskov Oblast, a village in Nevelsky District

=== Ryazan Oblast ===
As of 2012, five rural localities in Ryazan Oblast bear this name:

- Berezovo, Klepikovsky District, Ryazan Oblast, a village in Busayevsky Rural Okrug of Klepikovsky District
- Berezovo, Mikhaylovsky District, Ryazan Oblast, a selo in Pechernikovsky Rural Okrug of Mikhaylovsky District
- Berezovo, Pronsky District, Ryazan Oblast, a selo in Berezovsky Rural Okrug of Pronsky District
- Berezovo, Ryazhsky District, Ryazan Oblast, a selo in Marchukovsky 2 Rural Okrug of Ryazhsky District
- Berezovo, Shilovsky District, Ryazan Oblast, a selo in Berezovsky Rural Okrug of Shilovsky District

=== Saratov Oblast ===
As of 2012, one rural locality in Saratov Oblast bears this name:

- Berezovo, Saratov Oblast, a selo in Pugachyovsky District

=== Sverdlovsk Oblast ===
As of 2012, one rural locality in Sverdlovsk Oblast bears this name:

- Berezovo, Sverdlovsk Oblast, a village in Lensky Selsoviet of Turinsky District

=== Tula Oblast ===
As of 2012, five rural localities in Tula Oblast bear this name:

- Berezovo, Belyovsky District, Tula Oblast, a village in Berezovsky Rural Okrug of Belyovsky District
- Berezovo, Dubensky District, Tula Oblast, a village in Protasovsky Rural Okrug of Dubensky District
- Berezovo, Odoyevsky District, Tula Oblast, a selo in Berezovskaya Rural Administration of Odoyevsky District
- Berezovo, Suvorovsky District, Tula Oblast, a selo in Berezovskaya Rural Territory of Suvorovsky District
- Berezovo, Venyovsky District, Tula Oblast, a selo in Povetkinsky Rural Okrug of Venyovsky District

=== Tver Oblast ===
As of 2012, two rural localities in Tver Oblast bear this name:

- Berezovo, Andreapolsky District, Tver Oblast, a village in Andreapolskoye Rural Settlement of Andreapolsky District
- Berezovo, Ostashkovsky District, Tver Oblast, a village in Svyatoselskoye Rural Settlement of Ostashkovsky District

=== Vologda Oblast ===
As of 2012, six rural localities in Vologda Oblast bear this name:

- Berezovo, Belozersky District, Vologda Oblast, a village in Antushevsky Selsoviet of Belozersky District
- Berezovo, Kirillovsky District, Vologda Oblast, a village in Charozersky Selsoviet of Kirillovsky District
- Berezovo, Permassky Selsoviet, Nikolsky District, Vologda Oblast, a village in Permassky Selsoviet of Nikolsky District
- Berezovo, Zelentsovsky Selsoviet, Nikolsky District, Vologda Oblast, a village in Zelentsovsky Selsoviet of Nikolsky District
- Berezovo, Nyuksensky District, Vologda Oblast, a village in Berezovsky Selsoviet of Nyuksensky District
- Berezovo, Velikoustyugsky District, Vologda Oblast, a village in Nizhneyerogodsky Selsoviet of Velikoustyugsky District

=== Voronezh Oblast ===
As of 2012, five rural localities in Voronezh Oblast bear this name:

- Berezovo, Liskinsky District, Voronezh Oblast, a khutor in Stepnyanskoye Rural Settlement of Liskinsky District
- Berezovo, Ostrogozhsky District, Voronezh Oblast, a selo in Berezovskoye Rural Settlement of Ostrogozhsky District
- Berezovo, Pavlovsky District, Voronezh Oblast, a selo in Peskovskoye Rural Settlement of Pavlovsky District
- Berezovo, Podgorensky District, Voronezh Oblast, a selo in Berezovskoye Rural Settlement of Podgorensky District
- Berezovo, Ramonsky District, Voronezh Oblast, a selo in Berezovskoye Rural Settlement of Ramonsky District

=== Zabaykalsky Krai ===
As of 2012, one rural locality in Zabaykalsky Krai bears this name:

- Berezovo, Zabaykalsky Krai, a selo in Nerchinsky District

== Alternative names ==
- Berezovo, alternative name of Verkhneberezovo, a village in Berezovsky Selsoviet of Pritobolny District in Kurgan Oblast; 54°50′N 65°6′E
- Berezovo, alternative name of Berezovka, a selo in Berezovsky Selsoviet of Krasnogorsky District in Altai Krai; 52°21′N 85°50′E
- Berezovo, alternative name of Nizhneberezovo, a selo in Berezovsky Selsoviet of Pritobolny District in Kurgan Oblast; 54°50′N 65°5′E

== Former localities ==
- Beryozovo, Chukotka Autonomous Okrug, abandoned selo in Anadyrsky District of Chukotka Autonomous Okrug

== See also ==
- Berezove
