= Lyutayevo =

Lyutayevo Лютаево
- Selo
- Location within Altai Krai Location within Russia
- Coordinates: 51°53′N 84°25′E
- Country: Russia
- Region: Altai Krai
- District: Soloneshensky District
- Time zone: UTC+7:00

Lyutayevo (Russian: Лютаево) is a rural locality (a selo) and the administrative center of Lyutayevsky Selsoviet, Soloneshensky District, Altai Krai, Russia. The population was 310 as of 2013. There are 8 streets.

== Geography ==
Lyutayevo is located 36 km north of Soloneshnoye (the district's administrative centre) by road.
