= Tumanovo =

Tumanovo (Russian: Туманово) is the name of several rural localities in Russia:

- Tumanovo, Altai Krai, a selo in Tumanovsky Selsoviet of Soloneshensky District of Altai Krai
- Tumanovo, Sakhalin Oblast, a selo in Makarovsky District of Sakhalin Oblast
- Tumanovo, Smolensk Oblast, a selo in Tumanovskoye Rural Settlement of Vyazemsky District of Smolensk Oblast
- Tumanovo, Sverdlovsk Oblast, a village in Turinsky District of Sverdlovsk Oblast
