= Iskra, Altai Krai =

Iskra Искра
- Selo
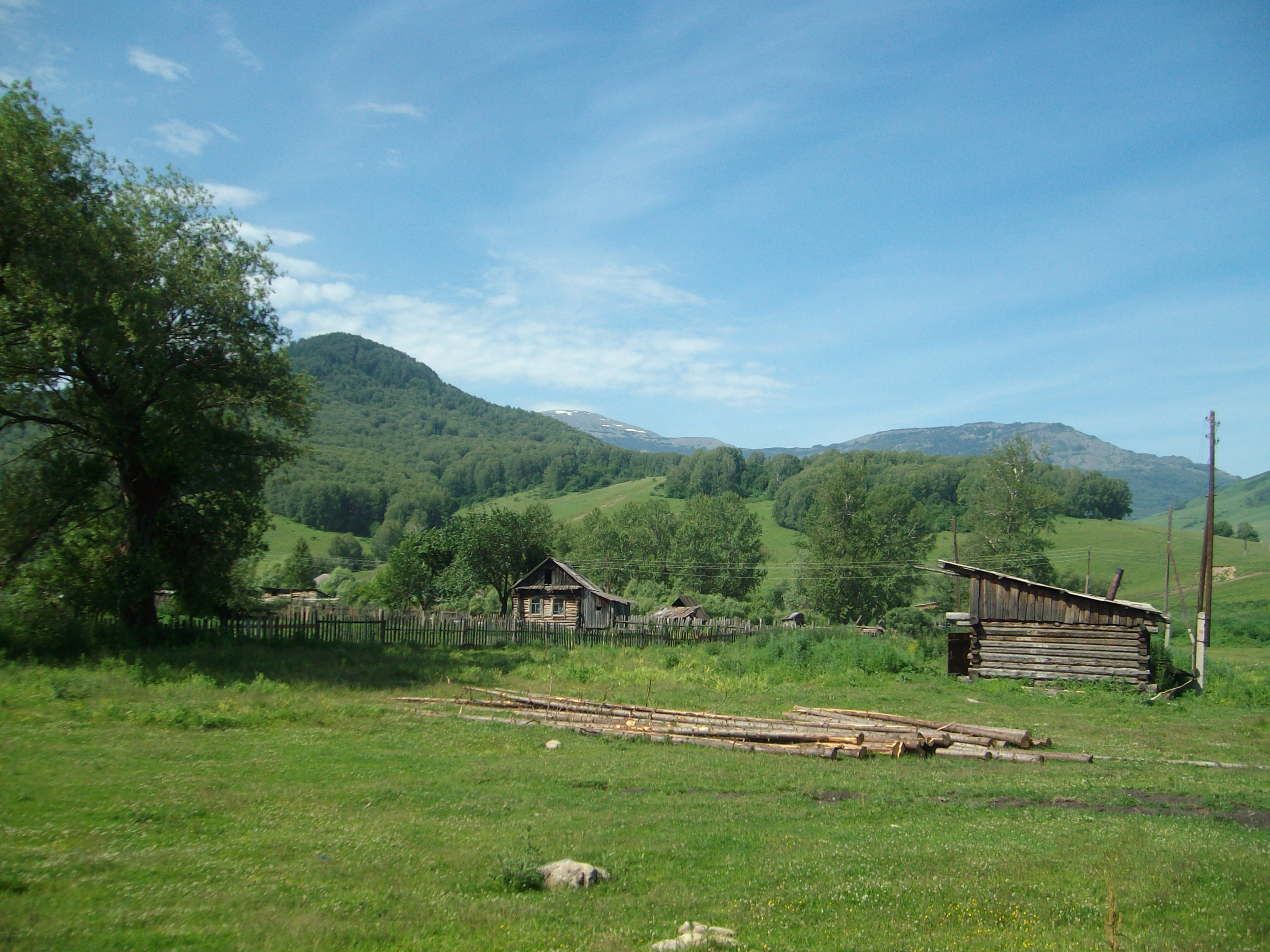
- Soloneshensky District facing Mount Budachikha.

- Location within Altai Krai Location within Russia
- Coordinates: 51°33′N 84°24′E
- Country: Russia
- Region: Altai Krai
- District: Soloneshensky District
- Time zone: UTC+7:00

Iskra (Russian: Искра) is a rural locality (a selo) in Soloneshensky Selsoviet, Soloneshensky District, Altai Krai, Russia. The population was 156 as of 2013. There are 4 streets.

== Geography ==
Iskra is located on the Anuy River, 14 km south of Soloneshnoye (the district's administrative centre) by road.
