= Telezhikha =

Telezhikha Тележиха
- Selo
- Location within Altai Krai Location within Russia
- Coordinates: 51°31′N 84°16′E
- Country: Russia
- Region: Altai Krai
- District: Soloneshensky District
- Time zone: UTC+7:00

Telezhikha (Russian: Тележиха) is a rural locality (a selo) in Soloneshensky Selsoviet, Soloneshensky District, Altai Krai, Russia. The population was 226 as of 2013. There are 2 streets.

== Geography ==
Telezhikha is located 22 km south of Soloneshnoye (the district's administrative centre) by road.
