= Sibiryachikha =

Village in Altai Krai, Russia

Sibiryachikha Сибирячиха
- Selo
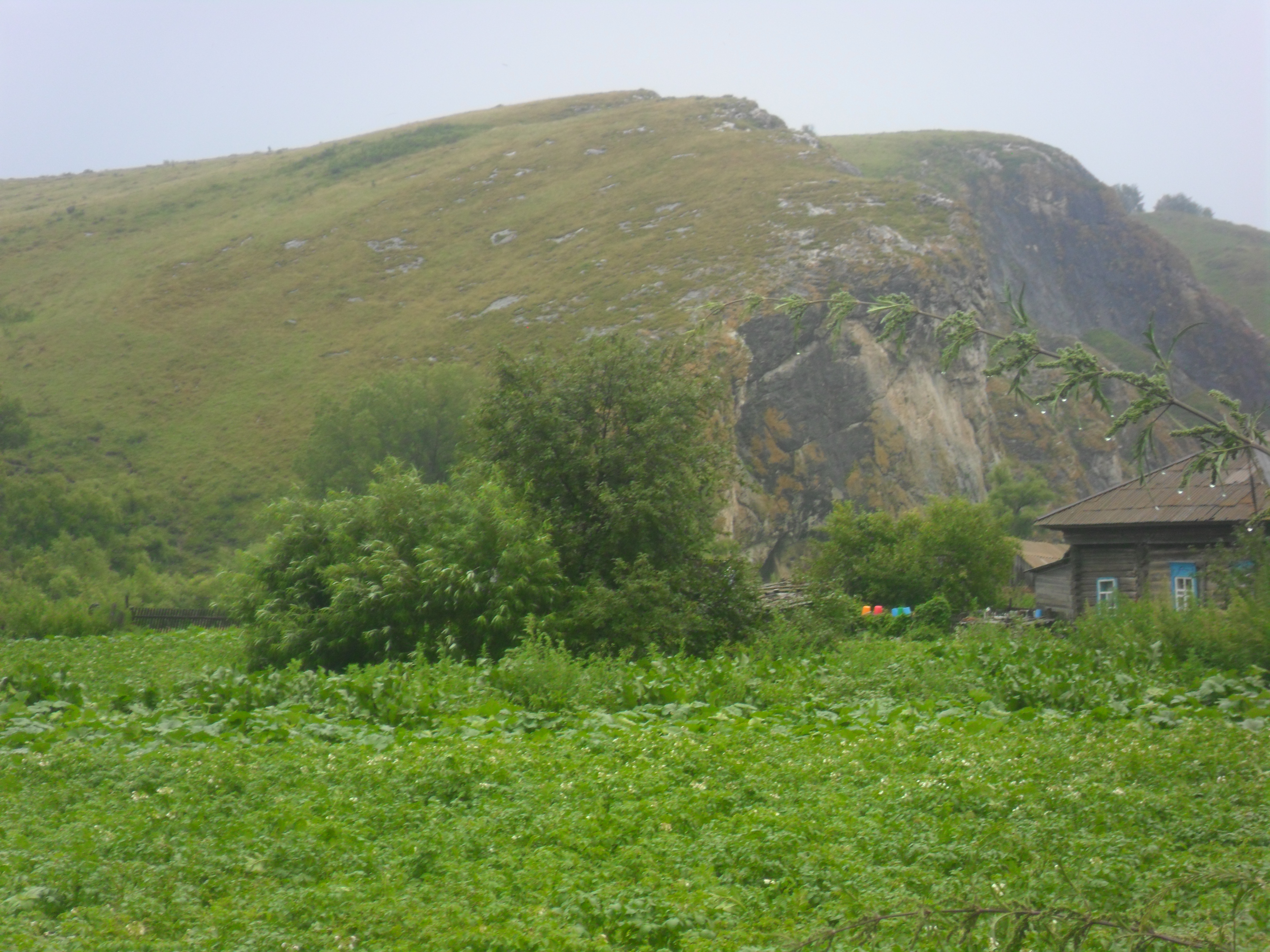
- An Okladnikov Cave view from Sibiryachikha

- Location within Altai Krai Location within Russia
- Coordinates: 51°44′N 84°03′E
- Country: Russia
- Region: Altai Krai
- District: Soloneshensky District
- Time zone: UTC+7:00

Sibiryachikha (Russian: Сибирячиха) is a rural locality (a selo) in Sibiryachikhinsky Selsoviet, Soloneshensky District, Altai Krai, Russia. The population was 709 as of 2013. There are 14 streets.

== Geography ==
Sibiryachikha is located 36 km northwest of Soloneshnoye (the district's administrative centre) by road. Sadovy is the nearest rural locality.
