= Souskanikha =

Rural locality in Krasnogorsky District, Russia

Coordinates: 52°34′N 85°58′E

Souskanikha (Russian: Соусканиха) is a rural locality (a selo) in Krasnogorsky District of Altai Krai, Russia, located 60 kilometers (37 mi) from the city of Biysk, in the Biya River floodplain. It is named after the Souskanikha River, the name of which, in turn, means "diving water" in Turkic.

== History ==
It was founded in the late 19th century by settlers from central Russia.

== Infrastructure ==
- House of Culture
- Secondary school accommodating 73 students as of 2010-2011
- Clinic
- Pharmacy
- 6 stores as of 2010
- Administration
- Post office

== Economy ==
Most of the population is employed in agriculture, especially in animal-breeding, bee-keeping, and farming.
