= UN Forces September 1950 counteroffensive =

1950 battle of the Korean War

UN September 1950 counteroffensive
- Part of the Korean War
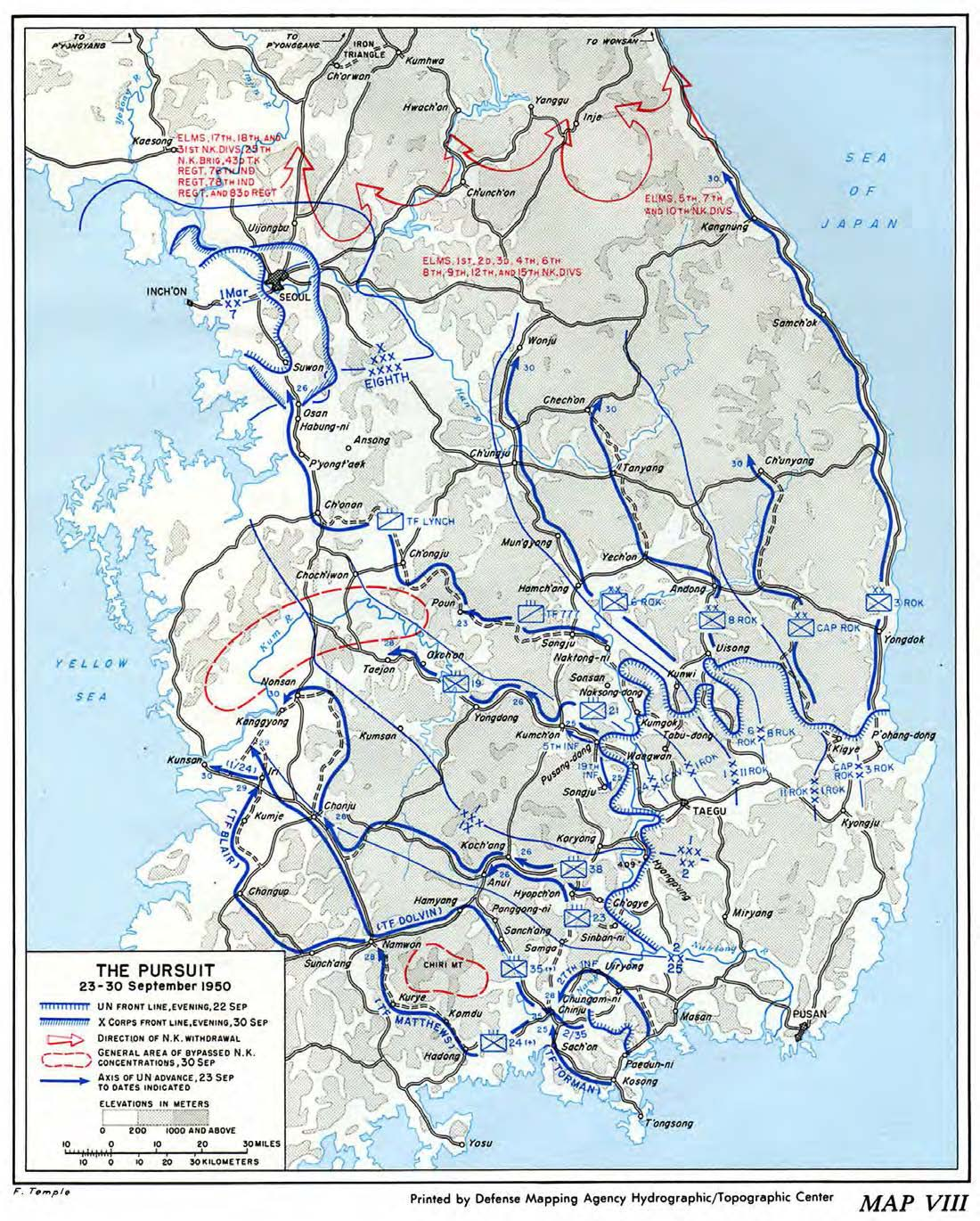
- Map of the UN Counteroffensive
| Date | 23–30 September 1950 |
| Location | South Korea |
| Result | United Nations victory |

Belligerents
| United Nations: United States; South Korea; United Kingdom | North Korea |

Commanders and leaders
| (United Nations) Douglas MacArthur (United States) Walton Walker (United States) Frank W. Milburn (United States) John B. Coulter (First Republic of Korea) Chung Il-Kwon (First Republic of Korea) Shin Sung-Mo (United States) Earle E. Partridge | (North Korea) Choi Yong-kun (North Korea) Kim Chaek (North Korea) Kim Ung (North Korea) Kim Mu Chong |

Units involved
| (United States) Eighth Army: (United States) I Corps; (United States) 1st Cavalry Division; (United States) 24th Infantry Division; (First Republic of Korea) 1st Infantry Division; (United Kingdom) 27th Infantry Brigade; (United States) IX Corps; (United States) 2nd Infantry Division; (United States) 25th Infantry Division; (First Republic of Korea) Republic of Korea Army: I Corps; 3rd Infantry Division; Capital Division; II Corps; 6th Infantry Division; 8th Infantry Division; (United States) Fifth Air Force | (North Korea) Korean People's Army: 1st Division; 2nd Division; 3rd Division; 4th Division; 6th Division; 7th Division; 8th Division; 13th Division; 15th Division; 27th Division; 105th Armored Division |

Strength
| 160,000 | 70,000 |

Casualties and losses
| (United States) 955 killed | |

The UN Forces September 1950 counteroffensive was a large-scale offensive by United Nations Command (UN) and Republic of Korea Army (ROKA) forces against North Korean forces commencing on 23 September 1950.

Following the UN counterattack at Inchon on 15 September, on 16 September ROKA/UN forces within the Pusan Perimeter broke out of the perimeter, driving back the North Koreans and moved north linking up with the UN forces coming from Inchon near Osan on 27 September.

== Background ==
By 23 September the Korean People's Army (KPA) was everywhere in retreat from the Pusan Perimeter. US Eighth Army, motorized and led by armored spearheads, was ready to sweep forward along the main axes of advance. On 22 September Eighth Army commander General Walton Walker issued his order for the pursuit. The Eighth Army order stated:

Enemy resistance has deteriorated along the Eighth Army front permitting the assumption of a general offensive from present positions. In view of this situation it is mandatory that all efforts be directed toward the destruction of the enemy by effecting deep penetrations, fully exploiting enemy weaknesses, and through the conduct of enveloping or encircling maneuver get astride enemy lines of withdrawal to cut his attempted retreat and destroy him.

The order directed a full-scale offensive: US I Corps was to continue to make the main effort along the Taegu-Kumch'on-Taejon-Suwon axis and to effect a linkup with X Corps coming from Inchon; the US 2nd Infantry Division was to launch an unlimited objective attack along the Hyopch'on-Koch'ang-Anui-Chonju-Kanggyong (36.153°N 127.01°E) axis; the 25th Infantry Division on the army's southern flank was to seize Chinju and be ready to attack west or northwest on army order; and the ROKA in the east was to destroy the KPA in its zone by deep penetrations and enveloping maneuvers. An important section of the Eighth Army order and a key to the contemplated operation stated, "Commanders will advance where necessary without regard to lateral security." Later in the day, Eighth Army issued radio orders making IX Corps, under General John B. Coulter, operational at 14:00, 23 September and attaching the US 2nd and 25th Infantry Divisions to it. This order charged IX Corps with the responsibility of carrying out the missions previously assigned to the 2nd and 25th Divisions. In preparing for the pursuit, Eighth Army moved its headquarters from Pusan back to Taegu, reopening there at 14:00, 23 September.

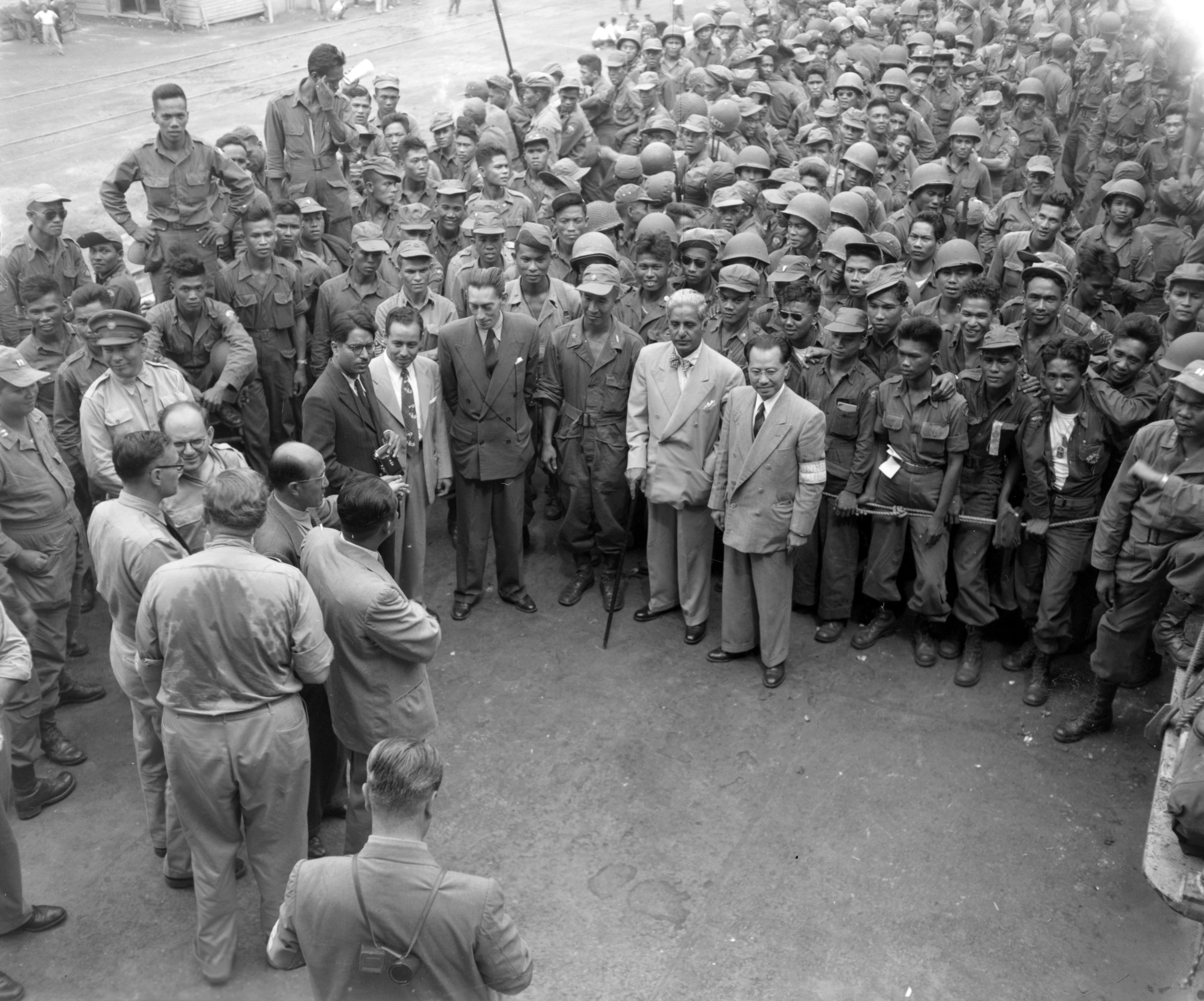
Philippine forces arrive at Pusan

The ROKA/UN forces around the Pusan Perimeter at this time numbered almost 160,000 men, of whom more than 76,000 were in Eighth Army and about 75,000 in the ROKA. UN reinforcements had begun arriving in Korea by this time. On 19 September the Philippine 10th Infantry Battalion Combat Team began unloading at Pusan, and on 22 September the 65th Regimental Combat Team started unloading there. The next day Swedish Red Cross Field Hospital personnel arrived at Pusan. On the 19th, the Far East Command deactivated the Pusan Logistical Command and reconstituted it as the 2nd Logistical Command, its mission of logistical support unchanged.

== Offensive ==
=== The 25th Division crosses southwest Korea ===
On 23 September Coulter, in a meeting with Walker at the 25th Division command post, requested authority to change the division's axis of attack from southwest to west and northwest. He thought this would permit better co-ordination with the 2nd Division to the north. Walker told Coulter he could alter the division boundaries within IX Corps so long as he did not change the Corps' boundaries. The change chiefly concerned the 27th Infantry Regiment which now had to move from the 25th Division's south flank to its north flank. 25th Division commander General William B. Kean formed a special task force under Captain Charles J. Torman, commanding officer of the 25th Reconnaissance Company, which moved through the 27th Infantry on the southern coastal road at Paedun-ni (35.05°N 128.362°E) the evening of the 23rd. The 27th Regiment then began its move from there to the division's north flank at Chungam-ni (35.25°N 128.275°E). The 27th Infantry was to establish a bridgehead across the Nam River and attack through Uiryong to Chinju.

On the morning of 24 September Task Force Torman attacked along the coastal road toward Chinju. North of Sach'on the task force engaged and dispersed about 200 KPA soldiers of the 3rd Battalion, 104th Security Regiment. By evening it had seized the high ground at the road juncture 3 miles (4.8 km) south of Chinju. The next morning the task force moved up to the Nam River bridge which crossed into Chinju. In doing so one of the tanks hit a mine and fragments from the explosion seriously wounded Torman, who had to be evacuated.

Meanwhile, on the main inland road to Chinju the KPA 6th Division delayed the 35th Infantry Regiment at the Chinju pass until the evening of 23 September, when covering units withdrew. The next day the 35th Infantry consolidated its position at the pass. That night a patrol reported that KPA demolitions had rendered the highway bridge over the Nam at Chinju unusable. On the strength of this information the 35th Infantry made plans to cross the Nam downstream from the bridge. Under cover of darkness at 02:00, 25 September, the 2nd Battalion crossed the river 2.5 miles (4.0 km) southeast of Chinju. It then attacked and seized Chinju, supported by tank fire from Task Force Torman across the river. About 300 KPA troops, using mortar and artillery fire, served as a delaying force in defending the town. The 3rd and 1st Battalions crossed the river into Chinju in the afternoon, and that evening Task Force Torman crossed on an underwater sandbag ford that the 65th Engineer Combat Battalion built 200 yards (180 m) east of the damaged highway bridge. Working all night, the engineers repaired the highway bridge so that vehicular traffic began crossing it at noon the next day, 26 September.

16 miles (26 km) downstream from Chinju, near the blown bridges leading to Uiryong, engineer troops and more than 1,000 Korean refugees worked all day on the 25th constructing a sandbag ford across the Nam River. KPA mortars fired sporadically on the workers until silenced by counterbattery fire of the 8th Field Artillery Battalion. Before dawn of the 26th the 1st Battalion, 27th Infantry, crossed the Nam. Once on the north bank, elements of the regiment attacked toward Uiryong, 3 miles (4.8 km) to the northwest, and secured the town just before noon after overcoming a KPA force that defended it with small arms and mortar fire. The regiment pressed on to Chinju against negligible resistance on 28 September.

On 24 September Eighth Army had altered its earlier operational order and directed IX Corps to execute unlimited objective attacks to seize Chonju and Kanggyong. To carry out his part of the order, Kean organized two main task forces with armored support centered about the 24th and 35th Infantry Regiments. The leading elements of these two task forces were known respectively as Task Force Matthews (formerly Task Force Torman) and Task Force Dolvin. Both forces were to start their drives from Chinju. Task Force Matthews, the lefthand column, was to proceed west toward Hadong and there turn northwest to Kurye, Namwon, Sunch'ang, Kumje, Iri and Kunsan on the Kum River estuary. Taking off at the same time, Task Force Dolvin, the righthand column, was to drive north out of Chinju toward Hamyang, there turn west to Namwon, and proceed northwest to Chonju, Iri and Kanggyong on the Kum River.

Three blown bridges west of Chinju delayed the departure of Task Force Matthews until 10:00, 27 September. Captain Charles M. Matthews, commanding officer of A Company, 79th Tank Battalion, led the advance out of Chinju with the 25th Reconnaissance Company and A Company, 79th Tank Battalion. Task Force Blair based around the 3rd Battalion, 24th Infantry, followed Task Force Matthews, and the rest of the regiment came behind it. Matthews reached Hadong at 17:30. In a sense, the advance of Task Force Matthews became a chase to rescue a group of US prisoners that the North Koreans moved just ahead of the pursuers. Korean civilians and bypassed KPA soldiers kept telling of them being four hours ahead, two hours ahead, but always ahead. At Hadong the column learned that some of the prisoners were only thirty minutes ahead. From Hadong, in bright moonlight, the attack turned northwest toward Kurye. About 10 miles (16 km) above Hadong at the little village of Komdu (35.162°N 127.661°E) the advanced elements of the task force liberated 11 American prisoners. They had belonged to the 3rd Battalion, 29th Infantry Regiment. Most of them were unable to walk and some had open wounds.

Just short of Namwon about noon on 28 September, several vehicles at the head of the task force became stuck in the river crossing below the town after Sergeant Raymond N. Reifers in the lead tank of the 25th Reconnaissance Company had crossed ahead of them. While the rest of the column halted behind the stuck vehicles, Reifers continued on into Namwon. Entering the town, Reifers found it full of KPA soldiers. Apparently the North Koreans' attention had been centered on two F-84 jets that could be seen sweeping in wide circles, rocketing and strafing the town, and they were unaware that pursuing ground elements were so close. Surprised by the sudden appearance of the American tank, the North Koreans scattered. Reifers heard American voices calling out, "Don't shoot! Americans! GIs here!" A second later a gateway leading into a large courtyard burst open and the prisoners poured out into the street. Reifers radioed for support and some of the tanks and vehicles now pushed ahead across the stream to join Reifers in Namwon. 86 American prisoners had been freed. Task Force Matthews cleared Namwon of KPA soldiers. In mid-afternoon Task Force Dolvin arrived there from the east. Task Force Matthews remained overnight in Namwon, but Task Force Blair continued on toward Chongup, which was secured at noon on 29 September. That evening Task Force Blair secured Iri. There, with the bridge across the river destroyed, Blair stopped for the night and Task Force Matthews joined it. Kunsan, the port city on the Kum River estuary, fell to the 1st Battalion, 24th Infantry, without opposition at 13:00 on 30 September.

Eastward of and generally parallel to the course of Task Force Matthews, Task Force Dolvin and the 35th Infantry moved around the eastern and northern sides of the all but impenetrable Chiri-san area, just as the 24th Infantry had passed around its southern and western sides. This almost trackless waste of 750 square miles of 6–7,000 feet (1.8–2,133.6 m) high forested mountains forms a rough rectangle northwest of Chinju about 30 miles (48 km) by 25 miles (40 km) in dimension, with Chinju, Hadong, Namwon and Hamyang at its four corners. This inaccessible area had long been a hideout for Communist agents and guerrillas in South Korea. Now, as the KPA retreated from southwest Korea, many stragglers and some organized units with as many as 200 to 400 men went into the Chiri Mountain area to carry on guerrilla activities.

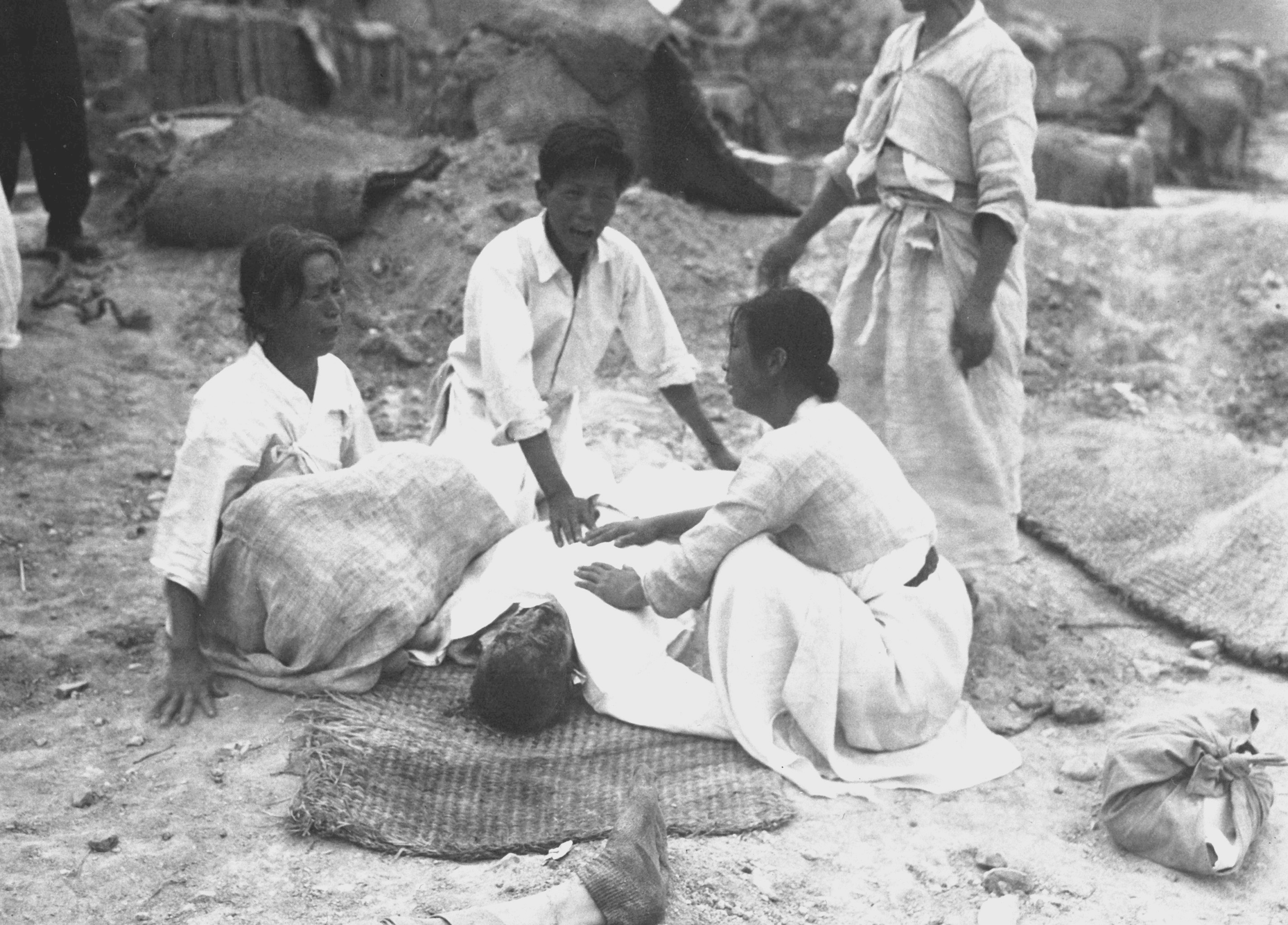
A Korean family mourns their father, killed by the KPA at Chonju

Task Force Dolvin moved out of Chinju at 06:00 on 26 September, on the road northwest toward Hamyang, the retreat route taken by the main body of the KPA 6th Division. The tank-infantry task force included as its main elements A and B Companies, 89th Medium Tank Battalion, and B and C Companies, 35th Infantry. It had two teams, A and B, each formed of an infantry company and a tank company. The infantry rode the rear decks of the tanks. The tank company commanders commanded the teams. 3 miles (4.8 km) out of Chinju the lead M26 Pershing struck a mine. While the column waited, engineers removed eleven more mines from the road. 0.5 miles (0.80 km) further on, a second tank was damaged in another minefield. Still farther along the road a third minefield, covered by a KPA platoon, stopped the column again. After the task force dispersed the KPA soldiers and cleared the road of mines, it found six antitank guns, nine vehicles, and an estimated seven truckloads of ammunition in the vicinity abandoned by the enemy. At dusk, the KPA blew a bridge 3 miles (4.8 km) north of Hajon-ni (35.487°N 127.825°E) just half an hour before the task force reached it. During the night the task force constructed a bypass. The next morning, 27 September, a mine explosion damaged and stopped the lead tank. KPA mortar and small arms fire from the ridges near the road struck the advanced tank-infantry team. Tank fire cleared the left side of the road, but an infantry attack on the right failed. The column halted, and radioed for an air strike. Sixteen F-51 fighter-bombers came in strafing and striking the KPA-held high ground with Napalm, fragmentation bombs, and rockets. Kean, who had come forward, watched the strike and then ordered the task force to press the attack and break through the KPA positions. The task force broke through on the road, bypassing an estimated 600 KPA soldiers. Another blown bridge halted the column for the night while engineers constructed a bypass. Continuing its advance at first light on the 28th, Task Force Dolvin at 11:00 met elements of the 23rd Infantry, 2nd Division, advancing from the east, at the road junction just east of Hamyang. There it halted three hours while engineers and 280 Korean laborers constructed a bypass around another blown bridge. Ever since leaving Chinju, Task Force Dolvin had encountered minefields and blown bridges, the principal delaying efforts of the retreating KPA 6th Division. When it was approaching Hamyang the task force received a liaison plane report that KPA forces were preparing to blow a bridge in the town. On Dolvin's orders the lead tanks sped ahead, machine-gunned KPA troops who were placing demolition charges, and seized the bridge intact. This success upset the KPA's delaying plans. The rest of the afternoon the task force dashed ahead at a speed of 20 miles (32 km) an hour. It caught up with numerous KPA groups, killing some of the soldiers, capturing others, and dispersing the rest. At midafternoon Task Force Dolvin entered Namwon to find that Task Force Matthews and elements of the 24th Infantry were already there.

Refuelling in Namwon, Task Force Dolvin just after midnight continued northward and in the morning reached Chonju, already occupied by elements of the 38th Infantry Regiment, and continued on through Iri to the Kum River. At 15:00, 30 September, its mission accomplished, Task Force Dolvin was dissolved. It had captured or destroyed 16 antitank guns, 19 vehicles, 65 tons of ammunition, 250 mines, captured 750 KPA soldiers, and killed an estimated 350 more. It lost three tanks disabled by mines and one officer and 45 enlisted men were wounded in action. In crossing southwest Korea from Chinju to the Kum River, Task Force Matthews had traveled 220 miles (350 km) and Task Force Dolvin, 138 miles (222 km). In the wake of Task Force Dolvin the 27th Regiment moved north from Chinju to Hamyang and Namwon on 29 September and maintained security on the supply road. This same day, 29 September, ROK Marines captured Yosu on the south coast.

=== The 2nd Infantry Division moves west ===
Opposite the old Naktong Bulge area, the KPA 9th, 4th and 2nd Divisions retreated westward. At Sinban-ni the 4th Division turned toward Hyopch'on. The 9th withdrew on Hyopch'on, and the 2nd, after passing through Ch'ogye (35.559°N 128.265°E), continued on to the same place. Apparently the 9th Division, in the lead, had passed through Hyopch'on before elements of the US 2nd Infantry Division closed in on the town.

On 23 September the 38th Infantry Regiment, 2nd Infantry Division had hard fighting in the hills around Ch'ogye before overcoming KPA delaying forces. The next day the 23rd Infantry Regiment from the southeast and the 38th Infantry from the northeast closed on Hyopch'on in a double envelopment movement. Elements of the 38th Infantry established a roadblock on the north-south Chinju-Kumch'on road running northeast out of Hyopch'on and cut off an estimated two KPA battalions still in the town. During the day the 3rd Battalion, 23rd Infantry, entered Hyopch'on after a rapid advance of 8 miles (13 km) from the southeast. As the KPA fled Hyopch'on in the afternoon, 38th Infantry fire killed an estimated 300 of them at the regiment's roadblock northeast of the town. Two flights of F-51s caught the rest in the open and continued their destruction. The surviving remnant fled in disorder for the hills. The country around Hyopch'on was alive with hard-pressed, fleeing North Koreans on 24 September, and the Fifth Air Force, flying 53 sorties in the area, wrought havoc among them. That night elements of the 1st Battalion, 38th Infantry, entered Hyopch'on from the north. At daylight on the 25th, the 38th Infantry started northwest from Hyopch'on for Koch'ang. The road soon became impassable for vehicles and the men had to de-truck and press forward on foot. In retreating ahead of the 38th Infantry on 25 September the KPA 2nd Division, according to prisoners, abandoned all its remaining vehicles and heavy equipment between Hyopch'on and Koch'ang. In its advance from Hyopch'on to Koch'ang the 38th Infantry captured 17 trucks, 10 motorcycles, 14 antitank guns, four artillery pieces, nine mortars, more than 300 tons of ammunition, and 450 KPA soldiers, and killed an estimated 260 more. Division remnants, numbering no more than 2,500 men, together with their commander, Major general Choe Hyon, who was ill, scattered into the mountains. Up ahead of the ground troops, the USAF in the late afternoon bombed, napalmed, rocketed, and strafed Koch'ang, leaving it virtually destroyed. After advancing approximately 30 miles (48 km) during the day, the 38th Infantry stopped at 20:30 that night only a few miles from the town.

Elements of the 38th Infantry entered Koch'ang at 08:30 on 26 September, capturing there a North Korean field hospital containing 45 KPA wounded. Prisoners disclosed that elements of the KPA 2nd, 4th, 9th and 10th Divisions were to have assembled at Koch'ang, but the swift advance of the US 2nd Division had frustrated the plan.

The 23rd Infantry Regiment was supposed to parallel the 38th Infantry on a road to the south, in the pursuit to Koch'ang, but aerial and road reconnaissance disclosed that this road was either impassable or did not exist. 2nd Division commander General Laurence B. Keiser then directed Colonel Paul L. Freeman Jr. to take a road to the north of the 38th Infantry. Mounted on organic transportation, the regiment, less its 1st Battalion, started at 16:00 on the 25th and made a night advance to Koch'ang, fighting three skirmishes and rebuilding four small bridges on the way. It arrived at Koch'ang soon after the 38th Infantry, in daylight on 26 September. That evening the 23rd Infantry continued the advance to Anui, 14 miles (23 km) away, which it reached at 19:30 without opposition. Except for the small town itself, the area was a maze of flooded paddies. The regimental vehicles could find no place to move off the roads except into the village streets where they were dispersed as well as possible. At least one KPA group remained in the vicinity of Anui. At 04:00 on 27 September, a heavy KPA artillery and mortar barrage struck in the town. The second round hit the 3rd Battalion command post, killing the battalion executive officer, the S-2, the assistant S-3, the motor officer, the artillery liaison officer, and an antiaircraft officer. The battalion commander Lieutenant colonel R. G. Sherrard, was severely wounded; also wounded were 25 enlisted men of the Regimental and Headquarters Companies.

Also on 27 September the last organized KPA unit east of the Naktong River, elements of the KPA 10th Division, withdrew from the notorious Hill 409 (35.676°N 128.413°E) and crossed to the west side of the river before daylight. Patrols of the 9th Infantry Regiment entered Hyongp'ung in the afternoon, and two companies of the 2nd Battalion occupied Hill 409 without opposition. On 28 September the 2nd Battalion, 9th Infantry, crossed the Naktong to join the 2nd Division after the newly arrived 65th Regimental Combat Team of the US 3rd Infantry Division relieved it on Hill 409.

At 04:00 on 28 September, Colonel Peploe started the 38th Infantry, with the 2nd Battalion leading, from Koch'ang in a motorized advance toward Chonju, 73 miles (117 km) to the west across the mountains. The 25th Division also was approaching Chonju through Namwon. Meeting only light and scattered resistance, the 2nd Battalion, 38th Infantry, entered Chonju at 13:15, having covered the distance in nine and a half hours. At Chonju the battalion had to overcome about 300 KPA soldiers of the 102nd and 104th Security Regiments, killing about 100 of them and taking 170 prisoners. There the 38th Infantry ran out of fuel for its vehicles. Fortunately, a 2nd Division liaison plane flew over the town and the pilot learned the situation. He reported it to the 2nd Division and IX Corps which rushed gasoline forward. At 15:30 on 29 September, after refueling, the 3rd Battalion departed Chonju for Nonsan and continued to Kanggyong on the Kum River, arriving there without incident at 03:00 the morning of 30 September.

IX Corps had only two and a half truck companies with which to transport supplies to the 25th and 2nd Divisions in their long penetrations, and the distance of front-line units from the railhead increased hourly. When the 2nd Division reached Nonsan on the 29th the supply line ran back more than 200 miles (320 km), much of it over mountainous terrain and often on one-way roads, to the railhead at Miryang. The average time for one trip was 48 hours. In one 105-hour period, Quartermaster truck drivers supporting the 2nd Division got only about 13 hours' sleep. At the end of September the 2nd Division was scattered from the Kum River southward, with the 38th Infantry in the Chonju-Kanggyong area, the 23rd Infantry in the Anui area, and the 9th Infantry in the Koryong-Samga area.

=== Recapture of Taejon ===
On the right flank of the US 2nd Infantry Division, the British 27th Infantry Brigade, attached to the US 24th Infantry Division for the pursuit, was to move against Songju while the 24th Division simultaneously attacked parallel to and north of it on the main highway toward Kumch'on. After passing through Songiu, the British brigade was to strike the main highway halfway between the Naktong River and Kumch'on. Its path took it along the main retreat route of the KPA 10th Division. The brigade was across the Naktong and ready to attack before daylight on 22 September. At dawn the 1st Battalion, Middlesex Regiment, seized a small hill, called by the men Plum Pudding Hill (35.916°N 128.3386°E), on the right of the road 3 miles (4.8 km) short of Songju. The battalion then attacked the higher ground immediately to the northeast, known to the British as Point 325 or Middlesex Hill (35.936°N 128.3345°E). Supported by US tank fire and their own mortar and machine gun fire, the Middlesex Battalion took the hill from dug-in KPA soldiers before dark. While the Middlesex Battalion attacked Hill 325, the 1st Battalion, Argyll and Sutherland Highlanders moved up to attack neighboring Hill 282 on the left of the road. Starting before dawn on 23 September B and C Companies after an hour's climb seized the crest of Hill 282 (35.905°N 128.324°E), surprising a KPA force at breakfast. Across a saddle, and nearly 1 mile (1.6 km) away to the southwest, higher Hill 388 (35.9°N 128.313°E) dominated the one they had just occupied. C Company started toward it, but KPA troops occupying this hill already were moving to attack the one just taken by the British. The KPA supported their attack with artillery and mortar fire, which began falling on the British. The action continued throughout the morning with KPA fire increasing in intensity. Shortly before noon, with American artillery fire inexplicably withdrawn and the five supporting U.S. tanks unable to bring the KPA under fire because of terrain obstacles, the Argylls called for an air strike on Hill 388. Just after noon the Argylls heard the sound of approaching planes. Three F-51s circled Hill 282 where the British displayed their white recognition panels. The KPA on Hill 388 also displayed white panels. To their dismay the tactical air control party was unable to establish radio contact with the F-51's. Suddenly, at 12:15, the F-51s attacked the wrong hill napalming and machine-gunning the Argyll position. The attack was over in two minutes and left the hilltop a sea of orange flame. Survivors plunged 50 feet (15 m) down the slope to escape the burning napalm. Major Kenneth Muir, second in command of the Argylls, watching the flames on the crest die down, noticed that a few wounded men still held a small area on top. Acting quickly, he assembled about 30 men and led them back up the hill before approaching KPA reached the top. There, two bursts of enemy automatic fire mortally wounded him as he and Major A. I. Gordon-Ingrain, B Company commander, fired a 2-inch mortar. However the situation on the hill was hopeless. Gordon-Ingram counted only ten men with him able to fight, and some of them were wounded. His three Bren guns were nearly out of ammunition. At 15:00 the survivors were down at the foot of the hill. The next day a count showed two officers and 11 men killed, four officers and 70 men wounded, and two men missing for a total of 89 casualties; of this number, the mistaken air attack caused approximately 60.

That night the 1st Battalion, 19th Infantry Regiment, attacked south from Pusang-dong (36.067°N 128.27°E) on the Waegwan- Kumch'on highway and captured Songju at 02:00 on 24 September. From there it moved to link up with the British 27th Brigade below the town. That day and the next the 19th Infantry and the British brigade mopped up in the Songju area. On the afternoon of 25 September the British brigade, released from attachment to the US 24th Division, reverted to I Corps control. The KPA 10th Division which had been fighting in the Songju area, its ammunition nearly gone and its vehicles out of fuel, withdrew on the 24th and 25th after burying its artillery. A captured division surgeon estimated the 10th Division had about 25 percent of its original strength at this time. About 25 September, KPA I Corps, ordered all its units south of Waegwan to retreat northward. On 23 September, the US 24th Division started its attack northwest along the Taejon-Seoul highway. General John H. Church had echeloned his three regiments in depth so that a fresh regiment would take the lead at short intervals and thus maintain impetus in the attack. Leading off for the division, the 21st Infantry Regiment headed for Kumch'on, the KPA headquarters. Elements of the KPA 105th Armored Division blocked the way with dug-in camouflaged tanks, antitank guns, and extensive minefields.

In the afternoon a tank battle developed in which D Company, 6th Medium Tank Battalion, lost four M46 Patton tanks to KPA tank and antitank fire. During a slow advance, US tanks and air strikes in turn destroyed three KPA tanks. Just as this main Eighth Army drive started it was threatened with a supply breakdown. Accurate KPA artillery fire during the night of the 22nd destroyed the only raft at the Naktong River ferry and cut the footbridge three times. The ferrying of vehicles and supplies during the day practically stopped, but at night local Koreans carried across the river the supplies and ammunition needed the next day. Shortly after midnight, 23–24 September, the 5th Regimental Combat Team (5th RCT) passed through the 21st Infantry to take the lead. KPA troops in positions on Hill 140, north of the highway, stopped the regiment about 3 miles (4.8 km), east of Kumch'on. There the KPA fought a major delaying action to permit large numbers of their retreating units to escape. The North Korean command diverted its 9th Division, retreating from the lower Naktong toward Taejon, to Kumch'on to block the rapid Eighth Army advance. Remaining tanks of two regiments of the KPA 105th Armored Division and the 849th Independent Anti-Tank Regiment, the latter recently arrived at Kumch'on from the north, also joined in the defense of the town. In the battle that followed in front of Kumch'on, the 24th Division lost six M46 tanks to KPA mines and antitank fire, while the KPA lost eight tanks, five to air attack and three to ground fire. In this action the KPA 849th Regiment was practically destroyed. The 5th RCT and supporting units lost approximately 100 men killed or wounded, most of them to tank and mortar fire. Smaller actions flared simultaneously at several points on the road back to Waegwan as bypassed KPA units struck at elements of the 19th Infantry bringing up the rear of the 24th Division advance.

As a result of the battle in front of Kumch'on on 24 September, the 21st Infantry swung to the north of the highway and joined the 5th RCT that night in a pincer attack on the town. The 3rd Battalion of the 5th RCT entered Kumch'on the next morning, and by 14:45 that afternoon the town, a mass of rubble from bombing and artillery barrages, was cleared of the KPA. That evening the 21st Infantry continued the attack westward. The 24th Division was interested only in the highway. If it was clear, the column went ahead. With the fall of Kumch'on on the 25th, KPA resistance melted away and it was clear that the KPA were intent only on escaping.

On 26 September the 19th Infantry took the division lead and its 2nd Battalion entered Yongdong without resistance. In the town jail the troops liberated three American prisoners. The regiment continued on and reached Okch'on, 10 miles (16 km) east of Taejon, at 02:00 on 27 September. There it halted briefly to refuel the tanks and give the men a little rest. At 05:30 the regiment resumed the advance, but just outside Okch'on the lead tank hit a mine and KPA antitank fire then destroyed it. The 1st Battalion deployed and attacked astride the road but advanced only a short distance. The KPA held the heights west of Okch'on in force and, as at Kumch'on three days earlier, were intent on a major delaying operation. This time it was to permit thousands of their retreating fellow soldiers to escape from Taejon. This fight in front of Taejon disclosed that the city, as expected, was an assembly point for retreating KPA units south and west of Waegwan. The 300 prisoners taken during the day included men from seven KPA divisions. The reports of KPA tanks destroyed in the Taejon area during the day are confusing, conflicting, and, taken together, certainly exaggerated. The ground forces reported destroying 13 tanks on the approaches to the city, three of them by A Company, 19th Infantry, bazooka teams. The USAF claimed a total of 20 tanks destroyed during the day, 13 of them in the Taejon area, and another eight damaged. At 07:00 on 28 September an air-strike hit the KPA blocking position. When the 2nd Battalion advanced cautiously up the slopes, it was unopposed. It then became clear that the KPA had withdrawn during the night. Aerial reconnaissance at the time of the air strike disclosed approximately 800 KPA troops moving out of Taejon on the road past the Taejon Airfield. At noon aerial observers saw more KPA troops assembling at the railroad station and another concentration of them a few miles west of Taejon turning toward Choch'iwon. The USAF napalmed and strafed still another force of 1,000 KPA soldiers west of the city. Scouts of the 2nd Battalion, 19th Infantry, and engineers of C Company, 3rd Engineer Combat Battalion, entered the outskirts of Taejon at 16:30. An hour later the 19th Infantry secured the city after engineers had cleared mines ahead of tanks leading the main column. At 18:00 a 24th Division artillery liaison plane landed at the Taejon Airfield.

On 28 September, the 19th Infantry Regiment captured so many KPA stragglers that it was unable to keep an accurate count of them. The capture of large numbers of prisoners continued during the last two days of the month; on the 30th the 24th Division took 447 of them. At Taejon the division captured much KPA equipment, including four U.S. howitzers lost earlier and 50 new North Korean heavy machine guns still packed in grease. At Choch'iwon the North Koreans were destroying equipment to prevent its capture. Already other US forces had passed Taejon and Choch'iwon on the east to cut the main highway farther north at Ch'onan and Osan. With the capture of Taejon, the 24th Division accomplished its mission in the pursuit.

On 29 September the 24th Division command post moved to Taejon. From there the division had the task of protecting the army line of communications back to the Naktong River. Its units were strung out for nearly 100 miles (160 km): the 19th Infantry held the Taejon area up to the Kum River, the 21st Infantry extended from Taejon southeast to Yongdong, the 5th RCT was in the Kumch'on area, and the 24th Reconnaissance Company secured the Waegwan bridges.

=== From Tabu-dong to Osan - the Eighth Army linkup with X Corps ===
The Eighth Army breakout plans initially required the 1st Cavalry Division to cross the Naktong River at Waegwan and follow the 24th Division toward Kumch'on and Taejon. As the breakout action progressed, however, I Corps changed the plan so that the 1st Cavalry Division would cross the river at some point above Waegwan, pursue a course east of and generally parallel to that of the 24th Division, and seize Sangju. I Corps commander General Frank W. Milburn left to General Hobart R. Gay the decision as to where he would cross. Gay and others, including Colonel Holmes, his chief of staff, and Colonel Holley of the 8th Engineer Combat Battalion, had proposed a crossing at Naktong-ni (36.365°N 128.298°E) where a KPA underwater bridge was known to exist. Walker rejected this proposal. He himself flew in a light plane along the Naktong above Waegwan and selected the ferry site at Sonsan as the place the division should cross.

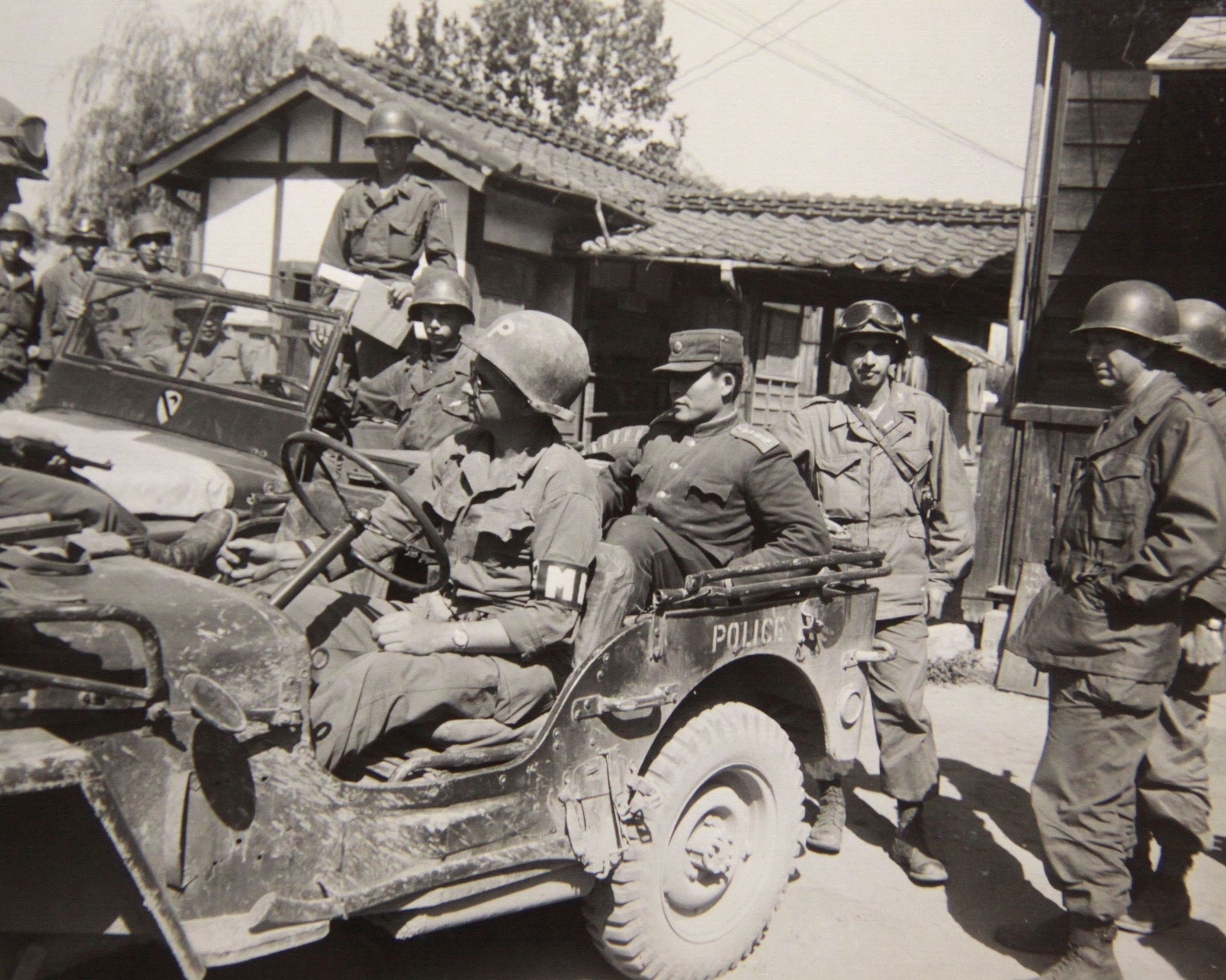
Colonel Lee Hak Ku, the chief of staff of the KPA 13th Division

In front of the 1st Cavalry Division two KPA divisions were retreating on Sangju. The KPA 3rd Division reportedly had only 1,800 men when its survivors arrived there. The other division, the 13th, was in complete disorder in the vicinity of Tabu-dong (36.047°N 128.518°E) and northward along the road to Sangju when the 1st Cavalry Division prepared to engage in the pursuit. On the morning of 21 September, Colonel Lee Hak Ku, the chief of staff of the KPA 13th Division surrendered to the 8th Cavalry Regiment near the village of Samsandong 4 miles (6.4 km) south of Tabu-dong. Lee had slipped away from his companions during the night and approached the US lines alone. He was the ranking North Korean prisoner at the time and remained so throughout the war. Before he became chief of staff of the 13th Division, Lee had been operations officer (G-3) of KPA II Corps. Based on his testimony, KPA II Corps had ordered its divisions on 17 September to go on the defensive and that the 13th Division knew nothing of the Inchon landing. Lee gave a full report on the deployment of the 13th Division troops in the vicinity of Tabu-dong, the location of the division command post and the remaining artillery, the status of supply, and the morale of the troops. He gave the strength of the division on 21 September as approximately 1,500 men. The division, he said, was no longer an effective fighting unit, it held no line, and its survivors were fleeing from the Tabu-dong area toward Sangju. The regiments had lost communication with the division and each, acting on its own impulse and according to necessity, was dispersed in confusion. Many other 13th Division prisoners captured subsequently confirmed the situation described by Lee. Lee said the 19th Regiment had about 200 men, the 21st Regiment about 330, the 23rd about 300; that from 70 to 80 percent of the troops were South Korean conscripts and this condition had existed for a month; that the officers and noncommissioned officers were North Korean; that all tanks attached to the division had been destroyed and only two of 16 self-propelled guns remained; that there were still nine 122-mm howitzers and five 120-mm mortars operational; that only 30 out of 300 trucks remained; that rations were down one half; and that supply came by rail from Ch'orwon via Seoul to Andong.

At the time of Lee's surrender, Gay had already directed Lieutenant colonel William A. Harris, Commanding Officer, 7th Cavalry Regiment, to lead the pursuit movement for the 1st Cavalry Division. Harris, now with a two-battalion regiment (the 2nd Battalion had relieved the British 27th Brigade on the Naktong), organized Task Force 777 for the effort. Each digit of the number represented one of the three principal elements of the force: the 7th Cavalry Regiment, the 77th Field Artillery Battalion, and the 70th Tank Battalion. Harris assigned Lieutenant colonel James H. Lynch's 3rd Battalion as the lead unit, and this force in turn was called Task Force Lynch. In addition to the 3rd Battalion, 7th Cavalry, it included B Company, 8th Engineer Combat Battalion; two platoons of C Company, 70th Tank Battalion (7 M4 tanks); the 77th Field Artillery Battalion (less one battery); the 3rd Platoon, Heavy Mortar Company; the regimental I&R Platoon; and a tactical air control party.

After helping to repel an attack by a large KPA force cut off below Tabu-dong and seeking to escape northward, Task Force Lynch started to move at 08:00, 22 September from a point just west of Tabu-dong. Brushing aside small scattered KPA groups, Lynch put tanks in the lead and the column moved forward. Up ahead flights of planes coursed up and down the road attacking fleeing groups of KPA soldiers. Near Naksong-dong, where the road curved over the crest of a hill, KPA antitank fire suddenly hit and stopped the lead tank. No-one could see the enemy guns. Gay, who was with the column, sent the remaining four tanks in the advance group over the crest of the hill at full speed firing all weapons. In this dash they overran two KPA antitank guns. Further along, the column halted while men in the point eliminated a group of KPA in a culvert in a 10-minute grenade battle. After the task force had turned into the river road at the village of Kumgok but was still short of its initial objective, the Sonsan ferry, a liaison plane flew over and dropped a message ordering it to continue north to Naktong-ni for the river crossing. The column reached the Sonsan ferry at 15:45. There, before he turned back to the division command post in Taegu, Gay approved Lynch's decision to stop pending confirmation of the order not to cross the river there but to proceed to Naktong-ni. At 18:00 Lynch received confirmation and repetition of the order, and an hour later he led his task force onto the road, heading north for Naktong-ni, 10 miles (16 km) away.

A bright three-quarter moon lit the way as the task force hastened forward. 5 miles (8.0 km) up the river road it began to pass through burning villages, and then suddenly it came upon the rear elements of retreating North Koreans who surrendered without resistance. At 22:30 the lead tanks halted on the bluff overlooking the Naktong River crossing at Naktong-ni. Peering ahead, men in the lead tank saw an antitank gun and fired on it. The round struck a concealed KPA ammunition truck. Shells in the truck exploded and a great conflagration burst forth. The illumination caused by the chance hit lighted the surrounding area and revealed a fascinating and eerie sight. Abandoned KPA tanks, trucks, and other vehicles littered the scene, while below at the underwater bridge several hundred KPA soldiers were in the water trying to escape across the river. The armor and other elements of the task force fired into them, killing an estimated 200 in the water. Task Force Lynch captured a large amount of equipment at the Naktong-ni crossing site, including two abandoned and operable T-34 tanks; 50 trucks, some of them still carrying US division markings; and approximately ten artillery pieces. According to prisoners taken at the time, this force consisted principally of units of the KPA 3rd Division, but it included also some men from the 1st and 13th Divisions. Reconnaissance parties reported the ford crossable in waist-deep water and the far bank free of KPA troops. Lynch then ordered the infantry to cross to the north bank. At 04:30, 23 September, I and K Companies stepped into the Naktong and began wading the river. The crossing continued to the accompaniment of an exploding KPA ammunition dump at the other end of the underwater bridge. At 05:30 the two companies secured the far bank. Altogether, in the 22 hours since leaving Tabu-dong, Task Force Lynch had advanced 36 miles (58 km), captured five tanks, 50 trucks, six motorcycles, 20 artillery pieces, secured a Naktong River crossing site, and had killed or captured an estimated 500 KPA soldiers.

During the 23rd, Major William O. Witherspoon, Jr., led his 1st Battalion across the river and continued on 10 miles (16 km) northwest to Sangju, which he found abandoned. Meanwhile, Engineer troops put into operation at Naktong-ni a ferry and raft capable of transporting trucks and tanks across the river, and on the 24th they employed 400 Korean laborers to improve the old North Korean underwater bridge. Tanks were across the river before noon that day and immediately moved forward to join the task force at Sangju. As soon as the tanks arrived, Harris sent Captain John R. Flynn with K Company, 7th Cavalry, and a platoon of tanks 30 miles (48 km) farther up the road to Poun, which they entered before dark. Harris had authority only to concentrate the regiment at Poun; he was not to go any farther. On the 24th also, Gay sent a tank-infantry team down the road from Sangju towards Kumch'on where the 24th Division was engaged in a hard fight on the main Waegwan-Taejon- Seoul highway. Since this took the force outside the 1st Cavalry Division zone of action, I Corps ordered it to withdraw, although it had succeeded in contacting elements of the 24th Division.

On 24–25 September Gay concentrated the 1st Cavalry Division in the Sangju-Naktong-ni area while his advanced regiment, the 7th Cavalry, stayed at Poun. About dark on the 25th he received a radio message from I Corps forbidding him to advance his division farther. Gay wanted to protest this message but was unable to establish radio communication with the Corps. He was able, however, to send a message to Eighth Army headquarters by liaison plane asking for clarification of what he thought was a confusion of Walker's orders, and requesting authority to continue the breakthrough and join X Corps in the vicinity of Suwon. During the evening, field telephone lines were installed at Gay's forward echelon division headquarters at the crossing site, and there, just before midnight, Gay received a message from Walker granting authority for him to go all the way to the link-up with X Corps if he could do so. Acting quickly on this authority, Gay called a commanders' conference in a Sangju schoolhouse the next morning, 26 September, and issued oral orders that at midday the division would start moving day and night until it joined the X Corps near Suwon. The 7th Cavalry Regiment was to lead the advance by way of Poun, Ch'ongju, Ch'onan, and Osan. Division headquarters and the artillery would follow. The 8th Cavalry Regiment was to move on Ansong via Koesan. At noon the 5th Cavalry Regiment, to be relieved by elements of the ROKA 1st Division, was to break off its attack toward Hamch'ang and form the division rear guard; upon reaching Choch'iwon and Ch'onan it was to halt, block KPA movement from the south and west, and await further orders.

On the right of the 1st Cavalry Division, the ROKA 1st Division, as part of US I Corps and the only ROKA unit operating as a part of Eighth Army, had passed through Tabu-dong from the north on 22 September and headed for the Sonsan ferry of the Naktong. It crossed the river there on the 25th, and moved north on the army right flank to relieve elements of the 1st Cavalry Division, and particularly the 5th Cavalry Regiment, in the Hamch'ang-Poun area above Sangju. The 1st Cavalry Division was now free to employ all its units in the pursuit. Upon receiving Gay's orders, Harris in turn ordered Lynch at Poun to lead northwest with his task force as rapidly as possible to effect a linkup with 7th Division troops of the X Corps somewhere in the vicinity of Suwon. This task force was the same as in the movement from Tabu-dong on the 22nd, except that now the artillery contingent comprised only C Battery of the 77th Field Artillery Battalion. The regimental I&R Platoon and 1st Lieutenant Robert W. Baker's 3rd Platoon of tanks, 70th Tank Battalion, led Task Force Lynch out of Poun at 11:30 on 26 September. Baker had orders from Lynch to move at maximum tank speed and not to fire unless fired upon. For mile after mile they encountered no KPA opposition, only cheers from South Korean villagers watching the column go past. Baker found Ch'ongju deserted except for a few civilians when he entered it at midafternoon. At approximately 18:00, after traveling 64 miles (103 km), Baker's tanks ran out of gasoline and the advance stopped at Ipchang-ni. For some reason the refuelling truck had not joined the tank-led column. Three of the six tanks refueled from gasoline cans collected in the column. Just after these three tanks had refueled, members of the I&R Platoon on security post down the road ran up and said a KPA tank was approaching. Instead, it proved to be three KPA trucks which approached quite close in the near dark before their drivers realized that they had come upon an American column. The drivers immediately abandoned their vehicles, and one of the trucks crashed into an I&R jeep. On the trucks was enough gasoline to refuel the other three tanks. About 20:00 the column was at last ready to proceed.

Harris ordered Lynch, at the latter's discretion, to drive on in the gathering darkness with vehicular lights on. This time Baker's platoon of tanks, rather than the I&R Platoon, was to lead the column. The other platoon of three tanks was to bring up the rear. At his request, Lynch gave Baker authority to shoot at KPA soldiers if he thought it necessary. Shortly after resuming the advance at 20:30 the task force entered the main Seoul highway just south of Ch'onan. It soon became apparent that the task force was catching up with KPA soldiers. Ch'onan was full of them. Not knowing which way to turn at a street intersection, Baker stopped, pointed, and asked a KPA soldier onguard, "Osan?" He received a nod just as the soldier recognized him as an American and began to run away. The rest of the task force followed through Ch'onan without opposition. Groups of KPA soldiers just stood around and watched the column go through. Beyond Ch'onan, Baker's tanks caught up with an estimated company of KPA soldiers marching north and fired on them with tank machine guns. Frequently they passed KPA vehicles on the road, KPA soldiers on guard at bridges, and other small groups. Soon the three lead tanks began to outdistance the rest of the column, and Lynch was unable to reach them by radio to slow them. In this situation, he formed a second point with a platoon of infantry and a 3.5-inch bazooka team riding trucks, the first truck carrying a .50-caliber ring-mounted machine gun. Actions against small enemy groups began to flare and increase in number. When they were 10 miles (16 km) south of Osan men in the task force heard from up ahead the sound of tank and artillery fire. Lynch ordered the column to turn off its lights. Separated from the rest of Task Force Lynch, and several miles in front of it by now, Baker's three tanks rumbled into Osan at full speed. After passing through the town, Baker stopped just north of it and thought he could hear vehicles of the task force on the road behind him, although he knew he was out of radio communication with it. T-34 tank tracks in the road indicated that KPA armor might be near.

Starting up again, Baker encountered KPA fire about 3–4 miles (4.8–6.4 km) north of Osan. His tanks ran through it and then Baker saw American M26 tank tracks. At this point fire against his tanks increased. Antitank fire sheared off the mount of the .50-caliber machine gun on the third tank and decapitated one of its crew members. Baker's tanks, now approaching the lines of the US 31st Infantry Regiment, X Corps, were receiving American small arms and 75-mm recoilless rifle fire. American tanks on the line held their fire because the excessive speed of the approaching tanks, the sound of their motors, and their headlights caused the tankers to doubt that they were enemy. One tank commander let the first of Baker's tanks go through, intending to fire on the second, when a white phosphorus grenade lit up the white star on one of the tanks and identified them in time to avoid a tragedy. Baker stopped his tanks inside the 31st Infantry lines. He had established contact with elements of X Corps. The time was 22:26 on 26 September; the distance, 106 miles (171 km) miles from the starting point at Poun at 11:30 that morning. That Baker ever got through was a matter of great good luck for, unknown to him, he had run through a strong KPA tank force south of Osan which apparently thought his tanks were some of its own, then through the KPA lines north of Osan, and finally into the 31st Infantry position just beyond the KPA. Fortuitously, American antitank and antipersonnel mines on the road in front of the American position had just been removed before Baker's tanks arrived, because the 31st Infantry was preparing to launch an attack. Baker's tanks may have escaped destruction from American weapons because of a warning given to X Corps. Shortly after noon of 26 September MacArthur's headquarters in Tokyo had radioed a message to X Corps and to the Far East Air Forces saying that elements of Eighth Army might appear at any time in the X Corps zone of action and for the Corps to take every precaution to prevent bombing, strafing, or firing on these troops. At mid-afternoon, Walker and Fifth Air Force commander General Earle E. Partridge, flying from Taegu unannounced, landed at Suwon Airfield and conferred with members of the 31st Infantry staff for about an hour. Walker said that elements of the 1st Cavalry Division attacking from the south would probably arrive in the Osan area and meet the 7th Division within 36 hours. Baker and the 31st Infantry tank crews at the front line tried unsuccessfully to reach Task Force Lynch by radio.

Instead of being right behind Baker at Osan, the rest of Task Force Lynch was at least an hour behind him. After turning out vehicular lights approximately 10 miles (16 km) south of Osan, Task Force Lynch continued in blackout. Just south of the village of Habong-ni, Lynch, about midnight, noticed a T-34 tank some 20 yards (18 m) off the road and commented to Captain Webel, the regimental S-3 who accompanied the task force, that the Air Force must have destroyed it. Many men in the column saw the tank. Suddenly it opened fire with cannon and machine gun. A second tank, unnoticed up to that time, joined in the fire. Task Force Lynch's vehicular column immediately pulled over and the men hit the ditch. Lieutenant John G. Hill Jr., went ahead to the point to bring back its rocket launcher team. This bazooka team destroyed one of the T-34s, but the second one moved down the road firing into vehicles and running over several of them. It finally turned off the road into a rice paddy where it continued to fire on the vehicles. A 75-mm recoilless rifle shell immobilized the tank, but it still kept on firing. Webel had followed this tank and at one point was just on the verge of climbing on it to drop a grenade down its periscope hole when it jerked loose from a vehicle it had crashed into and almost caught him under its tracks. Now, with the tank immobilized in the rice paddy, a 3.5 inch bazooka team moved up to destroy it but the weapon would not fire. Webel pulled a 5-gallon can of gasoline off one of the vehicles and hurried to the side of the tank. He climbed on it and poured the gasoline directly on the back and into the engine hatch. A few spurts of flame were followed by an explosion which blew Webel about 20 feet (6.1 m) to the rear of the tank. He landed on his side but scrambled to his feet and ran to the road. He had minor burns on face and hands and two ribs broken. The burning tank illuminated the entire surrounding area. Up at the head of the halted column, Lynch heard to the north the sound of other tank motors. He wondered if Baker's three tanks were returning. Watching, he saw two tanks come over a hill 800 yards (730 m) away. Fully aware that they might be KPA tanks, Lynch quickly ordered his driver to place the lead truck across the road to block it. The first tank was within 100 yards of him before they got the truck across the road. The two tanks halted a few yards away and from the first one a voice called out in Korean, "What the hell goes on here?" A hail of small arms fire replied to this shout. The two tanks immediately closed hatches and opened fire with cannon and machine guns. The truck blocking the road burst into flames and burned. The three tanks still with Task Force Lynch came up from the rear of the column and engaged the KPA tanks. Eight more T-34's quickly arrived and joined in the fight. The American tanks destroyed one T-34, but two of them in turn were destroyed by the KPA tanks. Webel, in running forward toward the erupting tank battle, came upon a group of soldiers who had a 3.5 inch bazooka and ammunition for it which they had just pulled from one of the smashed American trucks. No one in the group knew how to operate it. Webel took the bazooka, got into position, and hit two tanks, immobilizing both. As KPA soldiers evacuated the tanks, he stood up and fired on them with a Thompson submachine gun. Sergeant Willard H. Hopkins distinguished himself in this tank-infantry melee by mounting an enemy tank and dropping grenades down an open hatch, silencing the crew. He then organized a bazooka team and led it into action against other tanks. In the tank-infantry battle that raged during an hour or more, this bazooka team was credited by some sources with destroying or helping to destroy four of the KPA tanks. One of the KPA tanks ran all the way through the task force position shooting up vehicles and smashing into them as it went. At the southern end of the column a 105-mm howitzer had been set up and there, at a point-blank range of 25 yards (23 m), it destroyed this tank. Hopkins was killed in this exchange of crossfire as he was in the act of personally attacking this tank. Combined fire from many weapons destroyed another tank. Of the ten tanks in the attacking column, seven had been destroyed. The three remaining T-34's withdrew northward. In this night battle Task Force Lynch lost two men killed, 28 wounded, and two tanks and 15 other vehicles destroyed. After the last of the KPA tanks had rumbled away to the north, Harris decided to wait for daylight before going further. At 07:00 on 27 September, the task force started forward again. The men were on foot and prepared for action. Within a few minutes the point ran into a KPA tank which a 3.5 inch bazooka team destroyed. A KPA machine gun opened fire on the column, but was quickly overrun and the gunners killed in a headlong charge by Lieutenant William W. Woodside and two enlisted men. A little later the column came upon two abandoned KPA tanks and blew them up. The head of Task Force Lynch reached Osan at 08:00.

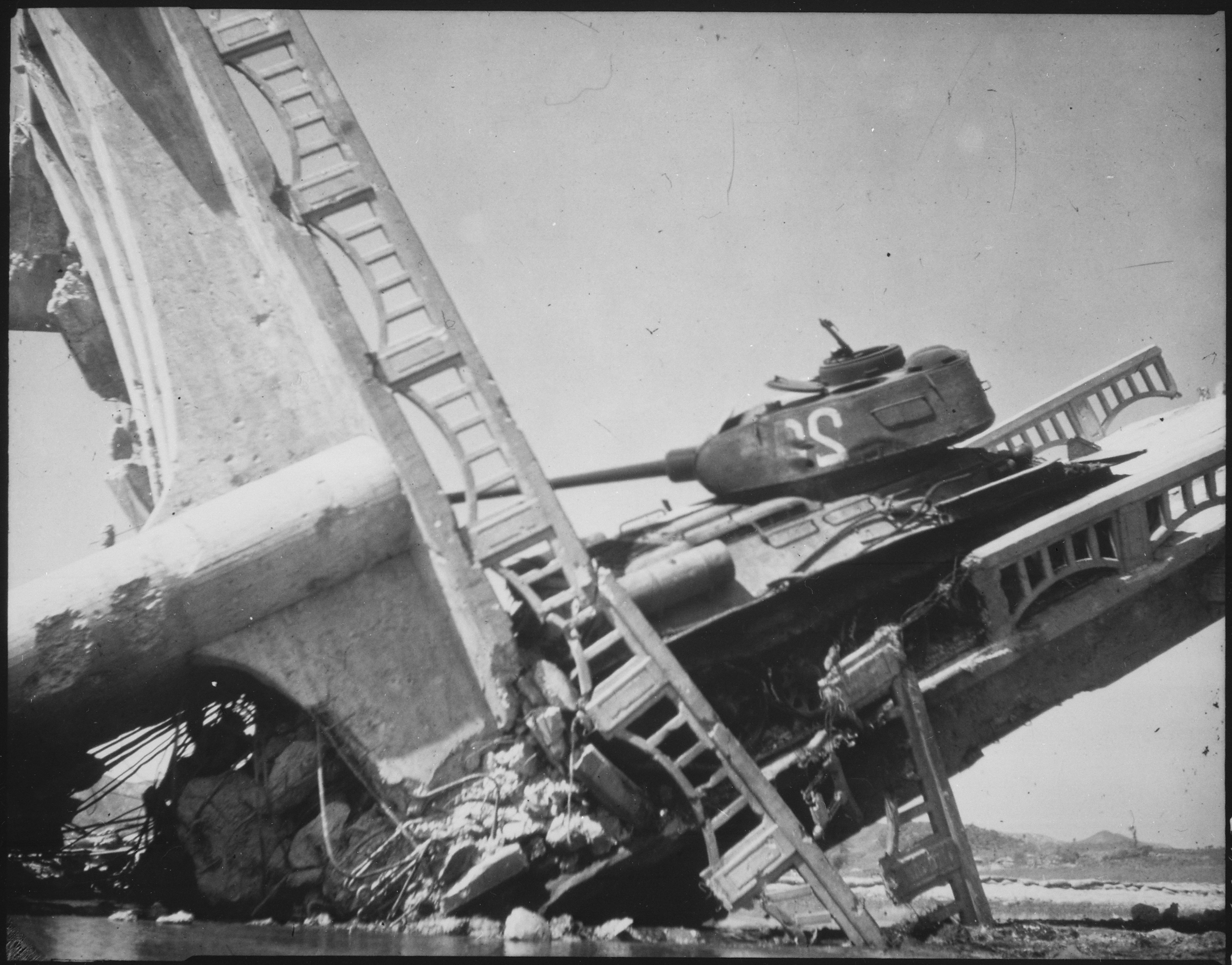
KPA T-34 on a destroyed bridge near Suwon

At 08:26 on 27 September, north of Osan Task Force 777 sent a message to Gay which said in part, "Contact between H Company, 31st Infantry Regiment, 7th Division, and forward elements of Task Force 777 established at 08:26 hours just north of Osan, Korea." After the link-up with elements of the 31st Infantry, elements of Task Force 777 did not actually participate in this regiment's attack against the North Koreans on the hills north of Osan. Their communication equipment, including the forward air controllers and their medical troops, however, did assist the 31st Infantry. Gay arrived at Osan before noon and, upon seeing the battle in progress on the hills to the north, conferred with a 31st Infantry battalion commander. He offered to use the 8th Cavalry Regiment as an enveloping force and assist in destroying the KPA. He also offered to the 31st Infantry, he said, the use of the 77th and 99th Field Artillery Battalions and one tank company. The battalion commander said he would need concurrence of higher authority. Elements of the 1st Cavalry Division stood idly by at Osan while the 31st Infantry fought out the action which it did not win until the next afternoon, 28 September. General David G. Barr, commanding general of the 7th Infantry Division, has said he was never informed of Gay's offer of assistance.

In this rapid advance to Osan, the 1st Cavalry Division cut off elements of the 105th Armored Division in the Ansong and P'yongt'aek area and miscellaneous units in the Taejon area. On the 28th, elements of C Company, 70th Tank Battalion, and K Company, 7th Cavalry, with the strong assistance of fighter-bombers, destroyed at least seven of ten T-34's in the P'yongt'aek area, five by air strikes. Elements of the 16th Reconnaissance Company barely escaped destruction by these KPA tanks, and did suffer casualties. As late as 29 September, L Company of the 5th Cavalry Regiment ambushed approximately 50 KPA soldiers in nine Russian-built jeeps driving north from the vicinity of Taejon.

=== The ROK advance to the 38th Parallel ===
In the east, the ROKA made advances from Taegu that kept pace with Eighth Army, and in some instances even outdistanced it. This performance is all the more remarkable because the ROKA, unlike the Eighth Army, was not motorized and its soldiers moved on foot. In the ROKA II Corps, the 6th and 8th Divisions on 24 September gained approximately 16 miles (26 km). The 6th Division advanced on Hamch'ang and entered it the night of 25 September. By the 27th it was advancing across the roughest part of the Sobaek Mountains, past Mun'gyong in the high passes, on its way to Chungju. On 30 September the 6th Division encountered KPA delaying groups as it approached Wonju.

The ROKA 8th Division made similarly rapid advances on the right of the 6th Division. Its reconnaissance elements entered Andong before midnight of the 24th. Five spans of the 31-span bridge over the Naktong there were down. Remnants of two KPA divisions, the 12th and 8th, were retreating on and through Andong at this time. The 12th Division was pretty well through the town, except for rearguard elements, when advanced units of the ROKA 8th Division arrived, but the main body of the KPA 8th Division had to detour into the mountains because ROKA troops arrived there ahead of it. After two days of fighting, during which it encountered extensive KPA minefields, the ROKA 8th Division secured Andong on 26 September. That evening the division's advanced elements entered Yech'on, 20 miles (32 km) northwest of Andong. The next day some of its troops were at Tanyang preparing to cross the upper Han River. On 30 September the division met strong KPA resistance at Chech'on and bypassed the town in the race northward.

The ROKA Capital Division was keeping pace with the others in the pursuit. On the 27th it had entered Ch'unyang, about 31 miles (50 km) east of the ROKA 8th Division, and was continuing northward through high mountains. On the night of 1–2 October, shortly after midnight, an organized KPA force of from 1,000 to 2,000 soldiers, which had been bypassed some place in the mountains, struck as it broke out in its attempt to escape northward. Directly in its path was Wonju where the ROKA II Corps headquarters was then located. This force overran the Corps headquarters and killed many of its men, including five American officers who were attached to the Corps or who had come to Wonju on liaison missions. The KPA ran amok in Wonju until morning, killing an estimated 1,000 to 2,000 civilians.

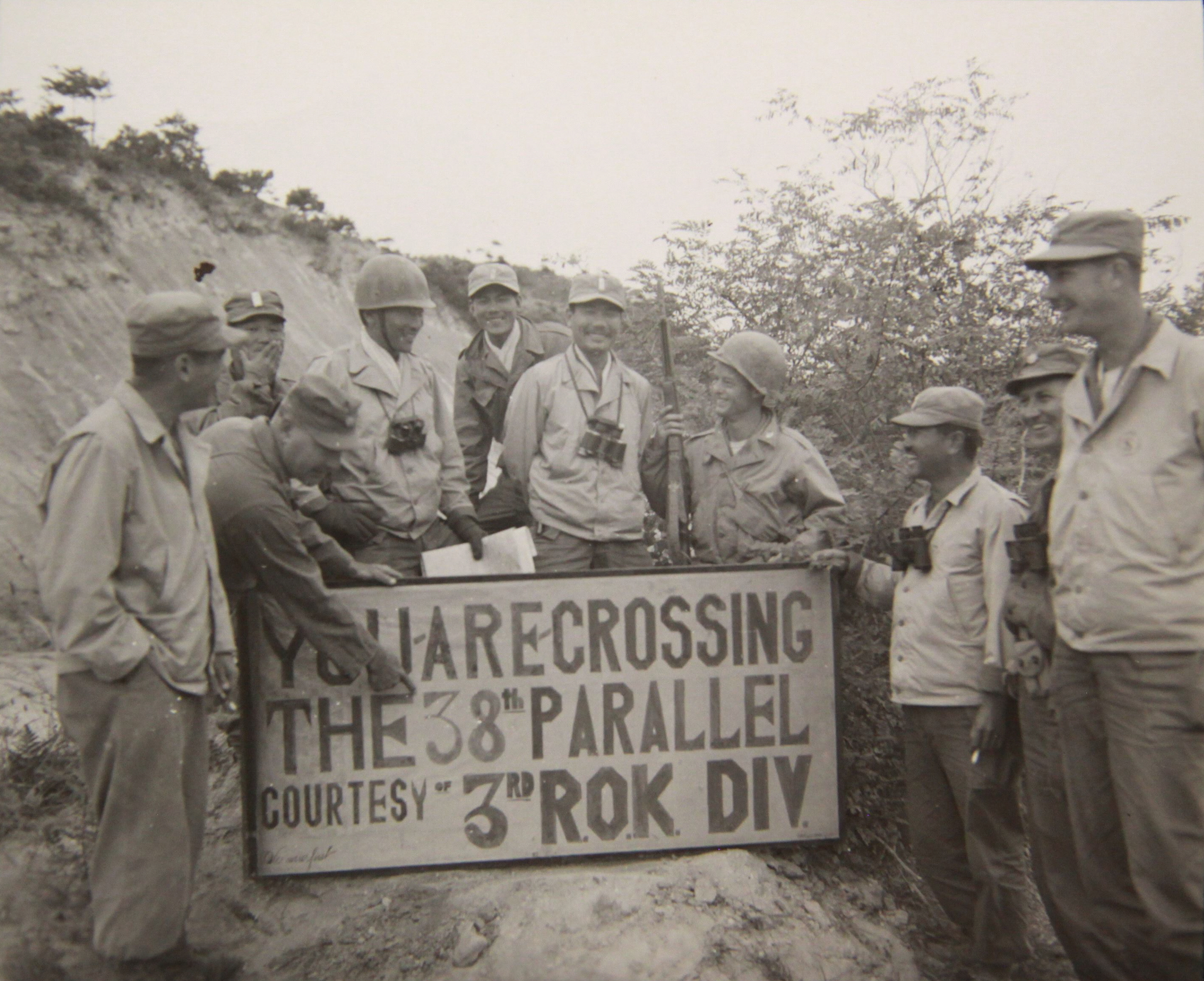
ROK 3rd Division troops on the 38th Parallel

Along the east coast the ROKA 3rd Division, with heavy US naval gunfire support, captured Yongdok on 25 September. A huge cloud of black smoke hung overhead from the burning city. The fall of the town apparently caught the KPA 5th Division by surprise. Some Russian-built trucks were found with motors running, and artillery pieces were still in position with ammunition at hand. Horse-drawn North Korean signal carts were found with ponies hitched and tied to trees. After the fall of Yongdok it appears that remnants of the 5th Division, totaling now no more than a regiment, turned inland for escape into the mountains. One KPA regimental commander divided his three remaining truckloads of ammunition and food among his men and told them to split into guerrilla bands. In the pursuit up the coastal road above Yongdok, Major Curtis J. Ivey, a member of KMAG, with the use of 25 2½-ton trucks made available for the purpose through the efforts of Colonel McPhail, KMAG adviser to the ROKA I Corps, led the ROKA forces northward in shuttle relays. When a roadblock was encountered it was Ivey who usually directed the action of the point in reducing it. The impressive gains by the ROKA units prompted Walker to remark on 25 September, "Too little has been said in praise of the South Korean Army which has performed so magnificently in helping turn this war from the defensive to the offensive." On up the coast road raced the ROKA 3rd Division. It secured Samch'ok on the morning of 29 September, and then continued on toward Kangnung. It moved north as fast as feet and wheels could take it over the coastal road. It led all ROKA units, in fact, all units of the UN Command, in the dash northward, reaching a point only 5 miles (8.0 km) below the 38th Parallel on 30 September.

== Aftermath ==
The last week of September witnessed a drastic change in the pattern of North Korean military activity. Enemy targets were disappearing from the scene. On 24 September some fighter pilots, unable to find targets, returned to their bases without having fired a shot. Survivors of the once victorious KPA were in flight or in hiding, and, in either case, they were but disorganized and demoralized remnants. On 1 October there occurred an incident illustrating the state of KPA demoralization. A USAF T-6 Mosquito Forward Air Controller pilot dropped a note to 200 KPA soldiers northeast of Kunsan ordering them to lay down their arms and assemble on a nearby hill. They complied. The pilot then guided UN patrols to the waiting prisoners. The virtual collapse of the North Korean military caused MacArthur on 1 October to order the USAF to cease further destruction of rail, highway, bridge, and other communication facilities south of the 38th Parallel, except where they were known to be actively supporting a KPA force. Air installations south of the 40th Parallel were not to be attacked, and he halted air action against strategic targets in North Korea. Loss of weapons and equipment in the retreat north from the Pusan Perimeter was of a scope equal to or greater than that suffered by the ROKA in the first week of the war. For the period 23–30 September, IX Corps alone captured four tanks, four self-propelled guns, 41 artillery pieces, 22 antitank guns, 42 mortars and 483 tons of ammunition. In I Corps, the 24th Division on one day, 1 October, captured on the Kumsan road below Taejon seven operable tanks and 15 artillery pieces together with their tractors and ammunition. On the last day of September the 5th Cavalry Regiment captured three trains complete with locomotives hidden in tunnels. A few miles north of Andong advancing ROKA forces found approximately ten 76-mm guns, eight 120-mm mortars, five trucks and four jeeps, together with dead KPA soldiers, in a tunnel—all had been destroyed earlier by USAF napalm attacks at either end of the tunnel. At Uisong, ROKA forces captured more than 100 tons of rice, other supplies, and most of the remaining equipment of one KPA division. The North Koreans had abandoned many tanks, guns, vehicles, ammunition, and other equipment because they lacked gasoline to operate their vehicles.

After the UN breakout from the Pusan Perimeter, in the period from 26 September to 21 October 1950, seven survey teams traveled over all major routes of armored movement between the Perimeter line and the 38th Parallel, and also along the Kaesong-Sariwon-P'yongyang highway above the Parallel. This survey disclosed 239 destroyed or abandoned T-34 tanks and 74 self-propelled 76-mm guns. The same survey counted 60 destroyed US tanks. According to this survey, air action destroyed 102 (43%) of the tanks, napalm accounting for 60 of them or one-fourth the total enemy tank casualties; there were 59 abandoned T-34's without any visible evidence of damage, also about one-fourth the total; UN tank fire accounted for 39 tanks (16%); and rocket launchers were credited with 13 tanks (5%). The number credited to bazooka fire is in error, for the number certainly is much higher. Very likely air action is credited in this survey with many tanks that originally were knocked out with infantry bazooka fire. There are many known cases where aircraft attacked immobilized tanks after bazooka fire had stopped them. There was an almost complete absence of KPA tanks destroyed by US antitank mines. No reliable information is available concerning the number of damaged tanks the North Koreans were able to repair and return to action. But the figure of 239 found destroyed or abandoned comes close to being the total number used by the KPA in South Korea. Very few escaped from the Pusan Perimeter into North Korea at the end of September. From July through September 1950 US tank losses to all causes was 136. A survey showed that mine explosions caused 70% of the loss. This high rate of US tank casualties in Korea to mines is all the more surprising since in World War II losses to mines came to only 20% of tank losses in all theaters of operations. In the two weeks beginning with 16 September, the breakout and pursuit period, the UN forces in the south placed 9,294 prisoners in the Eighth Army stockade. This brought the total to 12,777, Eighth Army had captured 6,740 of them and the ROKA 6,037. Beginning with 107 prisoners on 16 September the number had jumped to 435 on 23 September and passed the 1,000 mark daily with 1,084 on 27 September, 1,239 the next day, and 1,948 on 1 October.

The rapid sweep of the UN forces northward from the Pusan Perimeter in the last week of September bypassed thousands of KPA troops in the mountains of South Korea. One of the largest groups, estimated to number about 3,000 and including soldiers from the KPA 6th and 7th Divisions with about 500 civil officials, took refuge initially in the Chiri Mountains of southwest Korea. At the close of the month, of the two major KPA concentrations known to be still behind the UN lines, one was south of Kumch'on in the Hamyang area and the other northeast and northwest of Taejon. Just before midnight, 1 October, a force of approximately 60 KPA riflemen, using antitank and dummy mines, established and maintained a roadblock for nearly ten hours across the main Seoul highway about 15 miles (24 km) northwest of Kumch'on. A prisoner said this roadblock permitted about 2,000 KPA soldiers and a general officer of the KPA 6th Division to escape northward. The 6th at the time apparently still had its heavy machine guns and 82-mm. mortars but had discarded all heavier weapons in the vicinity of Sanch'ong.

North Korean sources make quite clear the general condition of the KPA at the end of September. The 6th Division started its withdrawal in good order, but most of its surviving troops scattered into the Chiri Mountain area and elsewhere along the escape route north so that only a part reached North Korea. The 7th Division commander reportedly was killed in action near Kumch'on as the division retreated northward; remnants assembled in the Inje-Yanggu area above the 38th Parallel in mid-October. In the 2nd Division, Major general Choe Hyon, the division commander, had only 200 troops with him north of Poun at the end of September. Other elements of the division had scattered into the hills. Parts of the 9th and 10th Divisions retreated through Taejon, and other parts cut across the Taejon highway below the city in the vicinity of Okch'on when they learned that the city had already fallen. Only a handful of men of the 105th Armored Division reached North Korea. The commanding general of KPA I Corps apparently dissolved his headquarters at Choch'iwon during the retreat and then fled with some staff officers northeast into the Taebaek Mountains on or about 27 September. From the central front near Taegu, 1,000 to 1,800 men of the 3rd Division succeeded in reaching P'yonggang at the beginning of October. The 1st Division, retreating through Wonju and Inje, assembled approximately 2,000 men at the end of October. Of all the KPA divisions fighting in South Korea perhaps no other suffered destruction as complete as the 13th. Certainly no other yielded so many high-ranking officers as prisoners of war. In August the 13th Division artillery commander surrendered; on 21 September Colonel Lee Hak Ku, the chief of staff, surrendered; three days later the commander of the self-propelled gun battalion surrendered; the division surgeon surrendered on the 27th; and Colonel Mun Che Won, a 26-year-old regimental commander, surrendered on 1 October after hiding near Tabu-dong for nearly a week. The commander of the 19th Regiment, 22-year-old Lieutenant colonel Yun Bong Hun led a remnant of his command northward by way of Kunwi, Andong, and Tanyang. Near Tanyang, finding his way blocked by ROKA troops, he marched his regiment, then numbering 167 men, into a ROK police station at Subi-myon and surrendered. A few members of the division eventually reached the P'yonggang area. Remnants of the 8th Division, numbering perhaps 1,500 men, made their way northeast of P'yonggang and continued on in October to a point near the Yalu River. Some small elements of the 15th Division escaped northward through Ch'unch'on to Kanggye in North Korea. From Kigye about 2,000 men of the 12th Division retreated through Andong to Inje, just north of the 38th Parallel, picking up stragglers from other divisions on the way so that the division numbered about 3,000 to 3,500 men upon arrival there. Remnants of the 5th Division infiltrated northward above Yongdok along and through the east coast mountains in the direction of Wonsan.

The bulk of the KPA troops that escaped from the Pusan Perimeter assembled in the Iron Triangle and the Hwach'on-Inje area of east-central North Korea just above the 38th Parallel. On 2 October a USAF pilot reported an estimated 5,000 KPA marching in small groups along the edge of the road north of the 38th Parallel between Hwach'on and Kumhwa. The commanding general of the KPA II Corps and his staff apparently escaped to the Kumhwa area in the Iron Triangle, and the best available evidence indicates that the commanding general and staff of the KPA Army Front Headquarters at Kumch'on also escaped northeast to the Iron Triangle. From there in subsequent months this headquarters directed guerrilla operations on UN lines of communications. It appears that not more than 25,000 to 30,000 disorganized North Korean soldiers reached North Korea from the Pusan Perimeter. For all practical purposes the KPA had been destroyed.

== See also ==
- Battle of Inchon
- Pusan Perimeter Offensive
- Second Battle of Seoul
- UN offensive into North Korea
