= Berezovo, Soloneshensky District, Altai Krai =

Rural locality in Altai Krai, Russia

Berezovo Берёзово
- Selo
- Location within Altai Krai Location within Russia
- Coordinates: 51°56′N 84°25′E
- Country: Russia
- Region: Altai Krai
- District: Soloneshensky District
- Time zone: UTC+7:00

Berezovo (Russian: Берёзово) is a rural locality (a selo) in Soloneshensky District, Altai Krai, Russia. The population was 45 as of 2013. There are 2 streets-- typical for a very small rural settlement. Altai Krai is a large agricultural and mountainous region in Western Siberia, Russia.

== Geography ==
Berezovo is located 45 km north of Soloneshnoye (the district's administrative centre) by road. Kamyshenka is the nearest rural locality.
