= Berezove =

Berezove may refer to:

- Berezove, Marinka Raion, a village in Donetsk Oblast, Ukraine
- Berezove, Starobilsk Raion, a village in Luhansk Oblast, Ukraine
- Berezove, Synelnykove Raion, a village in Dnipropetrovsk oblast, Ukraine

== See also ==
- Berezovo (disambiguation)
