= Berezovka, Krasnogorsky District, Altai Krai =

Berezovka Берёзовка
- Selo
- Location within Altai Krai Location within Russia
- Coordinates: 52°21′N 85°49′E
- Country: Russia
- Region: Altai Krai
- District: Krasnogorsky District
- Time zone: UTC+7:00

Berezovka (Russian: Берёзовка) is a rural locality (a selo) and the administrative center of Berezovsky Selsoviet, Krasnogorsky District, Altai Krai, Russia. The population was 1,243 as of 2013. There are 20 streets.

== Geography ==
Berezovka is located 35 km northwest of Krasnogorskoye (the district's administrative centre) by road. Bystryanka and Obraztsovka are the nearest rural localities.
