= Okladnikov =

Okladnikov may refer to:

- Alexey Pavlovich Okladnikov, a Soviet archaeologist, historian, and ethnographer
- Okladnikov Cave, a paleoanthropological site in Siberia containing the fossil remains of Neanderthals
