= Tumanovo, Altai Krai =

Tumanovo Туманово
- Selo
- Location within Altai Krai Location within Russia
- Coordinates: 51°35′N 84°38′E
- Country: Russia
- Region: Altai Krai
- District: Soloneshensky District
- Time zone: UTC+7:00

Tumanovo (Russian: Туманово) is a rural locality (a selo) and the administrative center of Tumanovsky Selsoviet, Soloneshensky District, Altai Krai, Russia. The population was 521 as of 2013. There are 7 streets.

== Geography ==
Tumanovo is located 32 km southeast of Soloneshnoye (the district's administrative centre) by road.
