= Okladnikov Cave =

Cave and archaeological site in Russia

- Пещера Окладникова (Russian)
- Sibiryachikha
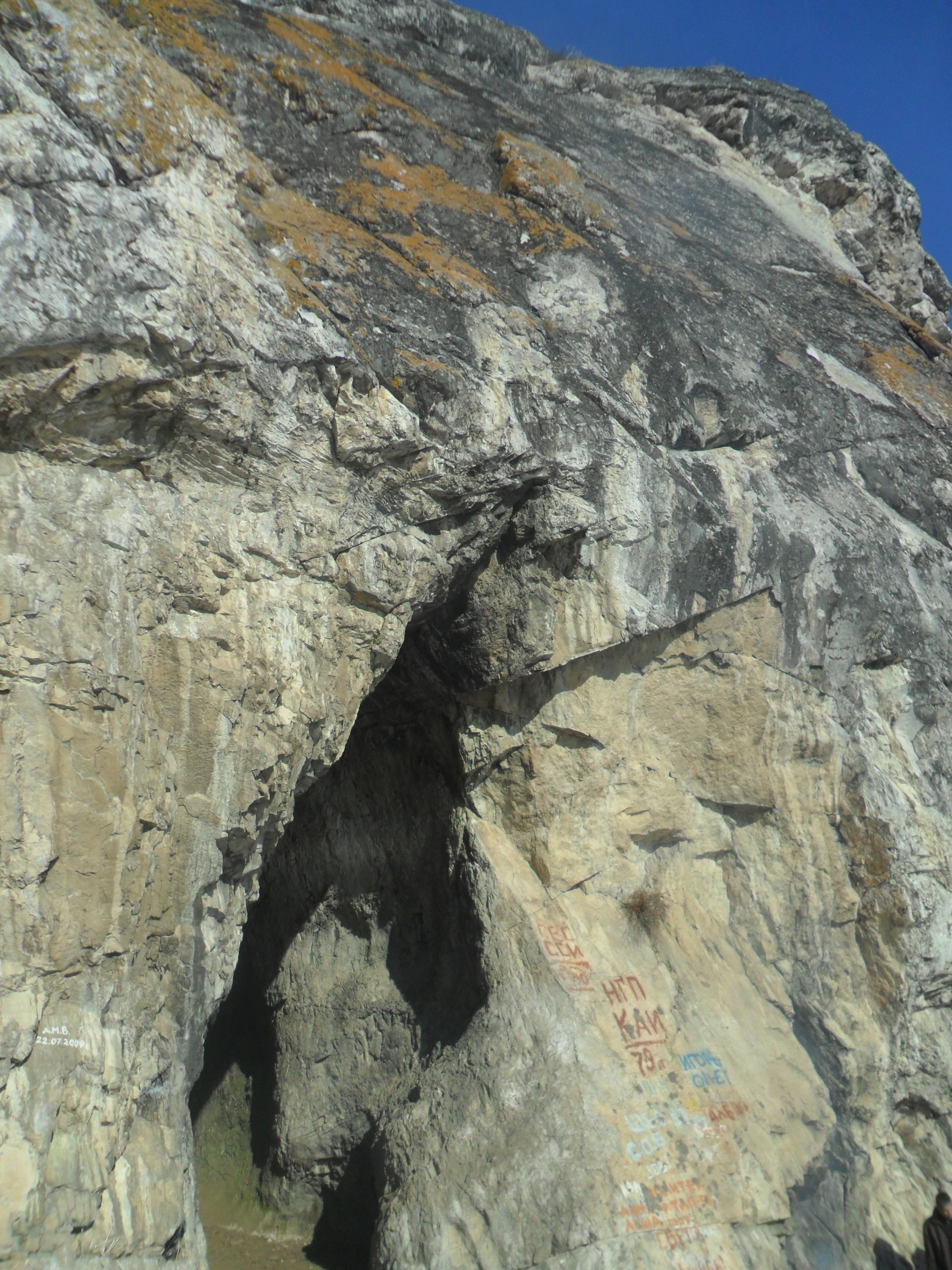
- Entrance to the cave

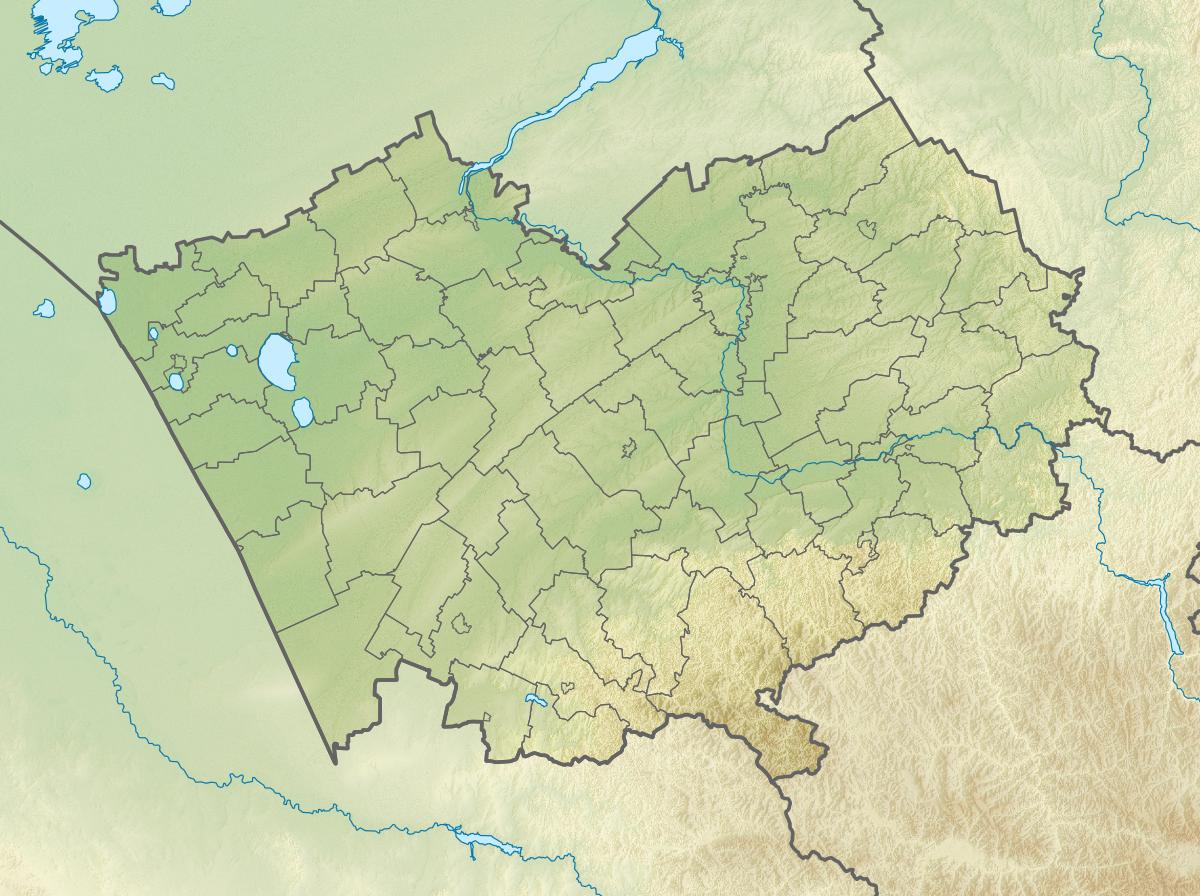
- Location in Russia Okladnikov Cave (Altai Krai) Okladnikov Cave (Russia)
- 51°40′N 84°20′E
- Type: limestone cave
- Periods: Paleolithic
- Cultures: Mousterian
- Associated with: Neanderthals
- Location: Soloneshensky District, Altai Krai, Russia
- Region: Anuy Basin, Altai-Sayan region

History
- Built: ca. 45,000 BP
- Abandoned: ca. 38,000 BP

Site notes
- Elevation: 350 or 650 m (1,150 or 2,130 ft)
- Length: 35 metres (115 ft)
- Excavation dates: 1984-1987

Okladnikov Cave (Russian: пещера Окладникова) is a paleoanthropological site located in the foothills of the Altai Mountains in Soloneshensky District, Altai Krai in southern Siberia, Russia. The cave faces south and is located on a Devonian karst escarpment, lying about 14 metres (46 ft) above the left bank of the Sibiryachikha River valley below; the river itself is a tributary of the Anuy River.

Okladnikov Cave is one of the most extensively studied Paleolithic sites in the Altai-Sayan region. A rich Mousterian stone industry, dating to between 33,000 and 44,000 years ago, was discovered, as well as several highly fragmented hominin fossils. Along with a few other Neanderthal sites in the Altai-Sayan region, Okladnikov Cave contains fossil evidence for the most easterly confirmed site with Neanderthal presence.

== Background ==
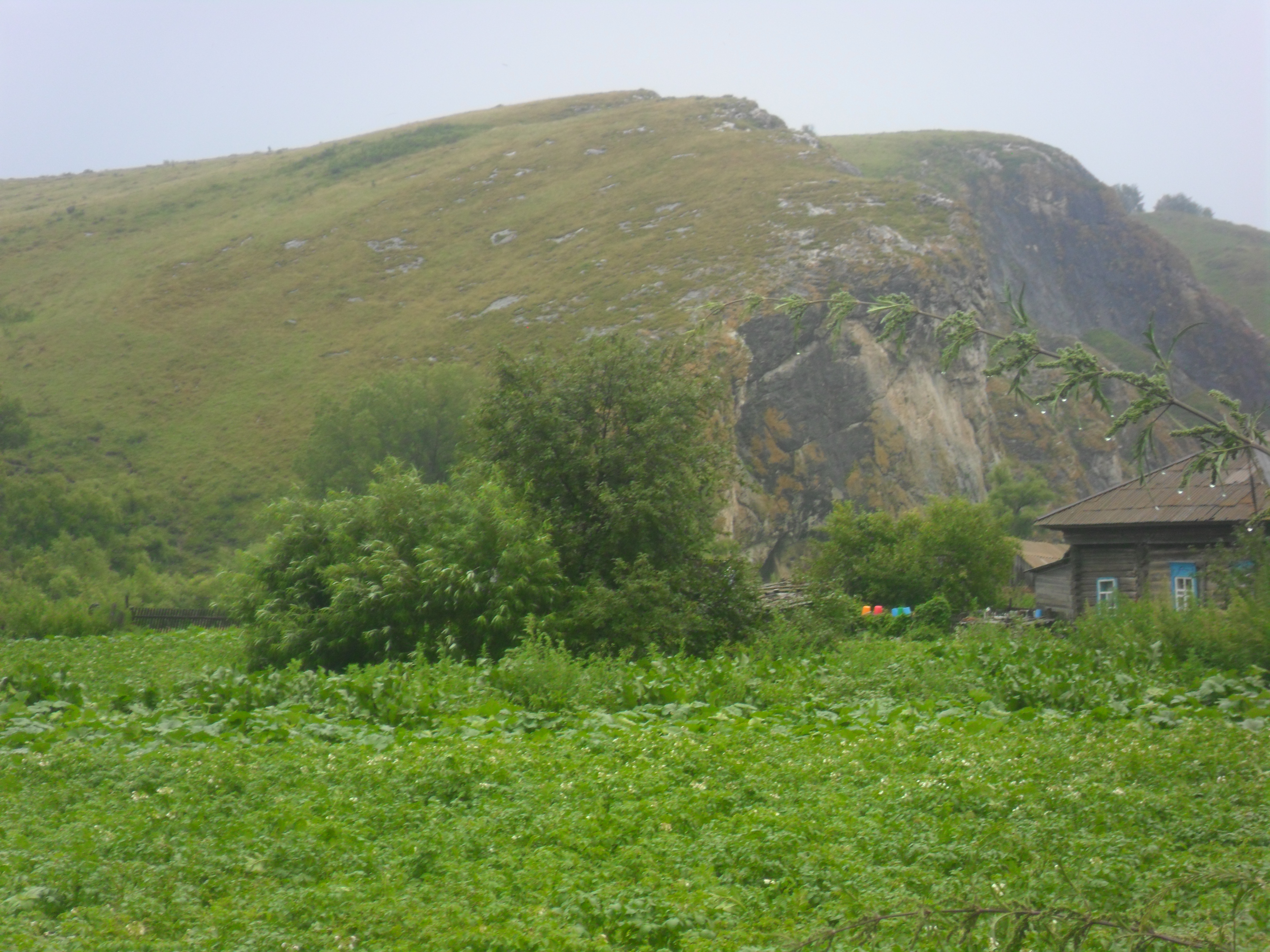
As viewed from Sibiryachikha

The cave was originally named after a nearby village, Sibiryachikha, located one kilometre (0.62 mi) away. The cave was renamed by Anatoly P. Derevianko in honor of Alexey Okladnikov. Okladnikov Cave was first excavated in 1984. The cave is one of several Paleolithic sites located in the Anuy Basin, along with Denisova Cave, Ust-Karakol, Kamminaya Cave, Isrkra Cave, Karama and Anuy I-III.

Palynological evidence suggest that, like today, the surrounding area during the time associated with Paleolithic hominin finds was composed primarily of dry forest steppe, albeit in a slightly colder and more humid context.

== Description ==
Situated around 50 km (31 mi) north of Denisova Cave, Okladnikov Cave is actually a complex of interconnected cavities: the cave consists of an overhang, an entrance stone bench that is 8 m (26 ft) wide, 2 m (6.6 ft) high and 4.2 m (13.78 ft) deep; and five corridors (galleries). The narrow cave extends into the hill for about 35 m (115 ft). Its entrance faces south at 14 m (46 ft) above the river. Just one hundred meters away is an animal cave, dubbed Sibiryachikha VI, in which an as yet unclassified child's humerus was found in 1985. Researchers suggested that this cave would have served better for human use than the actual Okladnikov Cave, although they found no traces of human occupation.

== Archaeology ==
=== Stratigraphy ===
Archaeologists have identified seven archaeological layers at Okladnikov Cave.

=== Artefacts ===
Nearly 4000 lithic tools have been recovered from Okladnikov Cave. Mousterian artefacts are found throughout all seven layers. The tool assemblage consisted mostly of scrapers and scraper-knives. Around a quarter of the tools at Okladnikov Cave were made from jasperoids, while around 5% were made from hornstones.

The lithic industry at Okladnikov Cave shares most similarities with another site in the Altai-Sayan region, Chagyrskaya Cave, and are rather distinct from other Altai sites. However, unlike at Chagyrskaya Cave, Levallois-type tools are uniquely found at Okladnikov Cave. Both sites contain a great number of Neanderthal/Mousterian stone tools. The lithic culture was initially referred to as the Altai Mousterian; nowadays, the culture is more commonly referred to as the Sibiryachikha culture or the Sibiryachikha variant.

=== Fauna ===
Over 6000 animal fossil elements were discovered at the cave, representing at least 20 different species. The remains of marmot, gray wolf, red fox, bear, horse, cave hyena, woolly rhinoceros, reindeer, steppe bison, red deer, Siberian ibex and argali sheep were commonly found inside the cave, with a heavy presence of cave hyena and woolly rhinoceros remains. Some beaver, Panthera spelaea and red wolf remains were also discovered.

The heavy presence of cave hyena remains indicate that the cave was most likely intermittently shared between cave hyenas and hominins.

=== Diet ===
Comparative studies on diet show that Neanderthals from the Altai-Sayan region lived in a manner similar to that of late European Neanderthals. Both show signs of being specialized hunters who were likely dependent on the subsistence hunting of large herbivores.

=== Hominin fossils ===
168 hominin fossil elements were discovered at the cave, with the majority coming from adults. The hominin remains include five teeth and nine cranial fragments, most likely representing at least four distinct individuals. Archaeologists had long suspected that the fossil hominin remains belonged to Neanderthals; however, some had argued that the remains belonged to humans with mixed Homo erectus traits. Rather fragmented and consequently hard to classify, morphological comparisons with Neanderthals did not produce definitively convincing results. This question was resolved through the successful application of DNA testing to some of the hominin fossil remains.

==== Samples ====
Dating information was directly obtained from several hominin fossil elements at Okladnikov Cave (Source:).

Lab number	Material	Normalized Age	Locality
KIA-27010	Neanderthal adult humerus	24260 ± 180	Sibiryachikha
RIDDL-719	Neanderthal adult humerus	37750 ± 750	Sibiryachikha
RIDDL-721	sub adult neanderthal	32400 ± 500	Sibiryachikha
RIDDL-722	sub adult neanderthal	43300 ± 1500	Sibiryachikha
RIDDL-720	sub adult neanderthal	40700 ± 1100	Sibiryachikha
SOAN-2459	sub adult neanderthal	28470 ± 1250	Sibiryachikha
SOAN-2458	sub adult neanderthal	16210 ± 0	Sibiryachikha
RIDDL-718	bone	33500 ± 700	Sibiryachikha

=== Archaeogenetics ===
In 2007, researchers from the Max Planck Institute for Evolutionary Anthropology succeeded in extracting DNA from two fossil hominin fragments from Okladnikov Cave: the humeral diaphysis of a juvenile and a separate femur fragment. mtDNA sequencing confirmed that both fragments most likely belonged the same individual, dubbed Okladnikov 2. The mtDNA sequences of the HVR I (hypervariable region I) from Okladnikov 2 confirmed that the individual was Neanderthal. On the basis of mtDNA analysis, Okladnikov 2 was found to be more related to European and western Asian Neanderthals. A 2014 re-analysis teasing out ancient DNA from contaminated sequences allowed researchers to complete the mtDNA sequence from Okladnikov 2. The completed sequence shows that the Okladnikov 2 mtDNA is basal to that sequenced from Mezmaiskaya 1 from Mezmaiskaya Cave and is even closer to western Neanderthals than previously thought.

== Implications ==
DNA extracted from skeletal remains has shown that Altai Neanderthals (closely related to Neanderthals found in western Europe) roamed some 2000 kilometres further east than previously thought.

The local habitat was rich in mammalian resources, allowing the Altai Neanderthals to permanently settle in the foothills of the Altai Mountains by at least 300,000 years ago. The Altai Neanderthals appeared to have chosen occupational sites primarily based on their strategic locations close to rivers and within valleys, locations ideal for hunting prey. During the early to middle Late Pleistocene, the broader region in general was most likely composed of forest and forest-tundra, based on a mix of conifer and some broad-leaved trees. Under these conditions, the Altai-Sayan region provided the early hominin inhabitants with a very appealing environment.
