= Anuy =

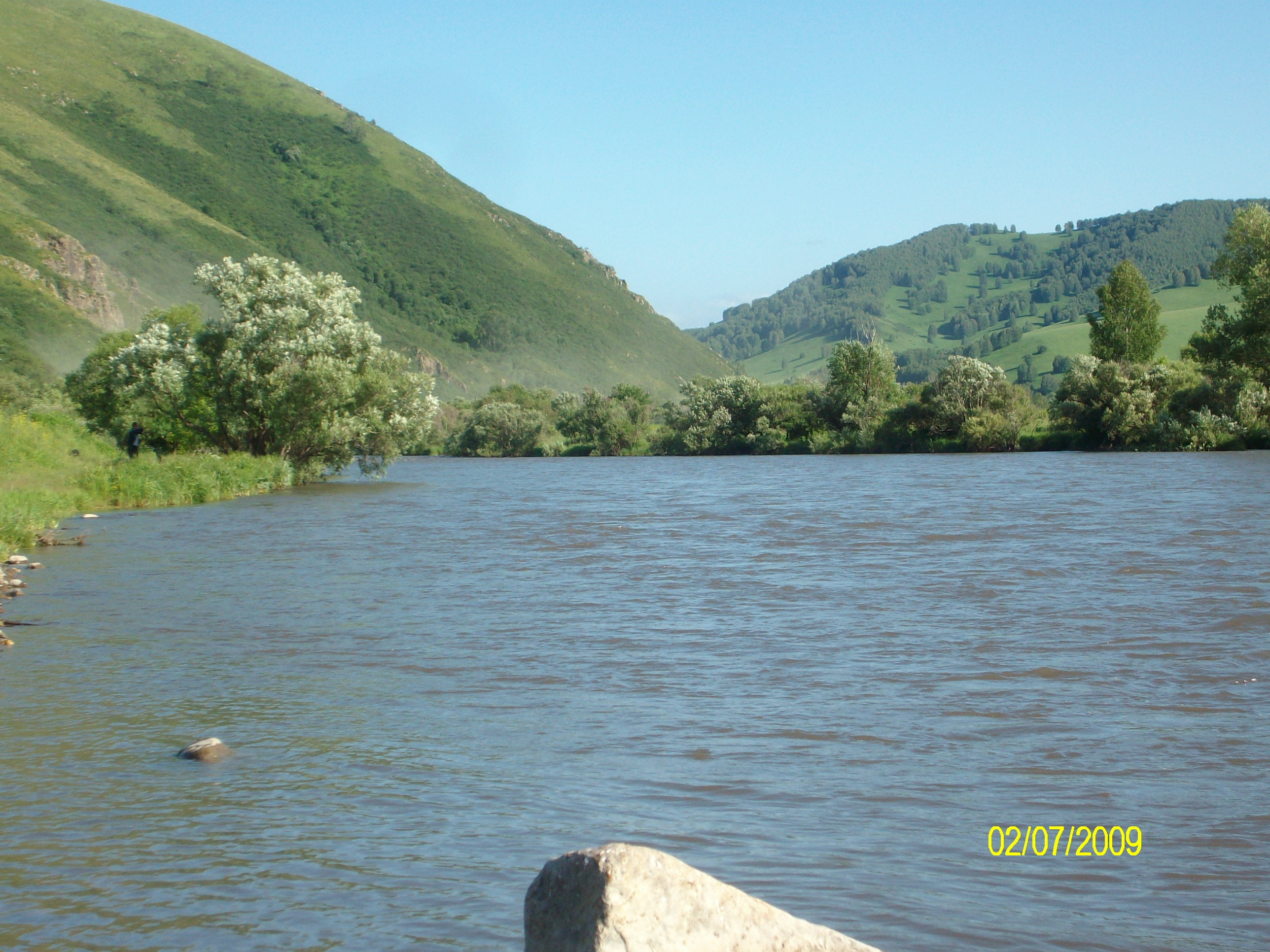

Location
- Country: Russia

Physical characteristics
- Mouth: Ob
  - coordinates: 52°24′10″N 84°44′40″E
- Length: 327 km (203 mi)
- Basin size: 6,930 km^{2} (2,680 sq mi)

Basin features
- Progression: Ob→ Kara Sea

The Anuy (Russian: река́ Ану́й) is a left tributary of the Ob originating in the Altai Mountains of Siberia, Russia. It is 327 kilometres (203 mi) long, and has a drainage basin of 6,930 square kilometres (2,680 sq mi).

The Chyorny Anuy and the smaller Bely Anuy join to form the Anuy. The Chyorny Anuy starts at an elevation of 1,220 metres (4,000 ft) at the southeastern end of the Anuy mountain range in the Altai Republic. Flowing in a northwestern direction, it enters Altai Krai after about 40 kilometres (25 mi). The two rivers join near Soloneshensky District.

The Anuy exits the Altai mountains at an elevation of 250 metres (820 ft) and flows in a northeastern to eastern direction. Near the village of Anuyskoye, the river takes a northern direction and joins the Ob west of Biysk at an elevation of about 150 metres (490 ft).

The average flow at Staro-Tirishkino, about 10 kilometres (6 mi) near the river's end, is about 36.1 cubic metres per second (1,270 cu ft/s) with a minimum of 6.9 cubic metres per second (240 cu ft/s) in February and a maximum of 123 cubic metres per second (4,300 cu ft/s) in April.

The Anuy is frozen between November and April. It is not navigable.

The Denisova Cave is approximately 28 metres (92 ft) above the right bank of the Anuy.
