= Berezove, Starobilsk Raion, Luhansk Oblast =

Berezove Березове
- Village
- Location of Berezove within Ukraine Berezove (Ukraine)
- Coordinates: 49°23′58″N 39°8′24″E
- Country: Ukraine
- Oblast: Luhansk Oblast
- Raion: Starobilsk Raion
- Founded: 1963

Area
  - Total: 0.361 km^{2} (0.139 sq mi)
- Elevation: 143 m (469 ft)

Population (2001 census)
  - Total: 20
  - Density: 55/km^{2} (140/sq mi)
- Time zone: UTC+2 (EET)
  - Summer (DST): UTC+3 (EEST)
- Postal code: 92731
- Area code: +380 6461

Berezove (Ukrainian: Березове; Russian: Берёзовое) is a village in Starobilsk Raion (district) in Luhansk Oblast of eastern Ukraine.

== Demographics ==
Native language as of the Ukrainian Census of 2001:

- Ukrainian 95.00%
- Russian 5.00%
