= Berezovo, Nyuksensky District, Vologda Oblast =

Berezovo Березово
- Village
- Location within Vologda Oblast Location within Russia
- Coordinates: 60°25′N 44°16′E
- Country: Russia
- Region: Vologda Oblast
- District: Nyuksensky District
- Time zone: UTC+3:00

Berezovo (Russian: Березово) is a rural locality (a village) in Nyuksenskoye Rural Settlement, Nyuksensky District, Vologda Oblast, Russia. The population was 85 as of 2002. There are 2 streets.

== Geography ==
Berezovo is located 19 km northeast of Nyuksenitsa (the district's administrative centre) by road. Norovo is the nearest rural locality.
