= Krasnogorskoye, Altai Krai =

Krasnogorskoye Красногорское
- Selo
- Interactive map of Krasnogorskoye
- Location of Krasnogorskoye Krasnogorskoye (Altai Krai)
- Coordinates: 52°17′50″N 86°11′44″E
- Country: Russia
- Federal subject: Altai Krai
- Administrative district: Krasnogorsky District
- SelsovietSelsoviet: Krasnogorsky Selsoviet
- Founded: 1811

Population (2010 Census)
  - Total: 5,993
  - Estimate (2021): 5,275 (−12%)

Administrative status
  - Capital of: Krasnogorsky District, Krasnogorsky Selsoviet

Municipal status
  - Municipal district: Krasnogorsky Municipal District
  - Rural settlement: Krasnogorsky Selsoviet Rural Settlement
  - Capital of: Krasnogorsky Municipal District, Krasnogorsky Selsoviet Rural Settlement
- Time zone: UTC+7 (MSK+4)
- Postal code: 659500
- OKTMO ID: 01619423101

Krasnogorskoye (Russian: Красногорское) is a rural locality (a selo) and the administrative center of Krasnogorsky District of Altai Krai, Russia. Population: 5,993 (2010 census); 6,756 (2002 census); 6,551 (1989 Soviet census).
