= Berezovo, Velikoustyugsky District, Vologda Oblast =

Berezovo Березово
- Village
- Location within Vologda Oblast Location within Russia
- Coordinates: 60°40′N 45°43′E
- Country: Russia
- Region: Vologda Oblast
- District: Velikoustyugsky District
- Time zone: UTC+3:00

Berezovo (Russian: Березово) is a rural locality (a village) in Nizhneyerogodskoye Rural Settlement, Velikoustyugsky District, Vologda Oblast, Russia. The population was 24 as of 2002.

== Geography ==
Berezovo is located 47 km southwest of Veliky Ustyug (the district's administrative centre) by road. Bolshoye Vostroye is the nearest rural locality.
