= Anuyskoye =

Anuyskoye Ануйское
- Selo
- Location within Altai Krai Location within Russia
- Coordinates: 52°18′N 84°51′E
- Country: Russia
- Region: Altai Krai
- District: Smolensky District
- Time zone: UTC+7:00

Anuyskoye (Russian: Ануйское) is a rural locality (a selo) and the administrative center of Anuysky Selsoviet, Smolensky District, Altai Krai, Russia. The population was 844 as of 2013. There are 14 streets.

== Geography ==
Anuyskoye is located 17 km west of Smolenskoye (the district's administrative centre) by road. Starotyryshkino is the nearest rural locality.
