= Krasnogorsky District, Altai Krai =

Krasnogorsky District Красногорский район (Russian)
- District
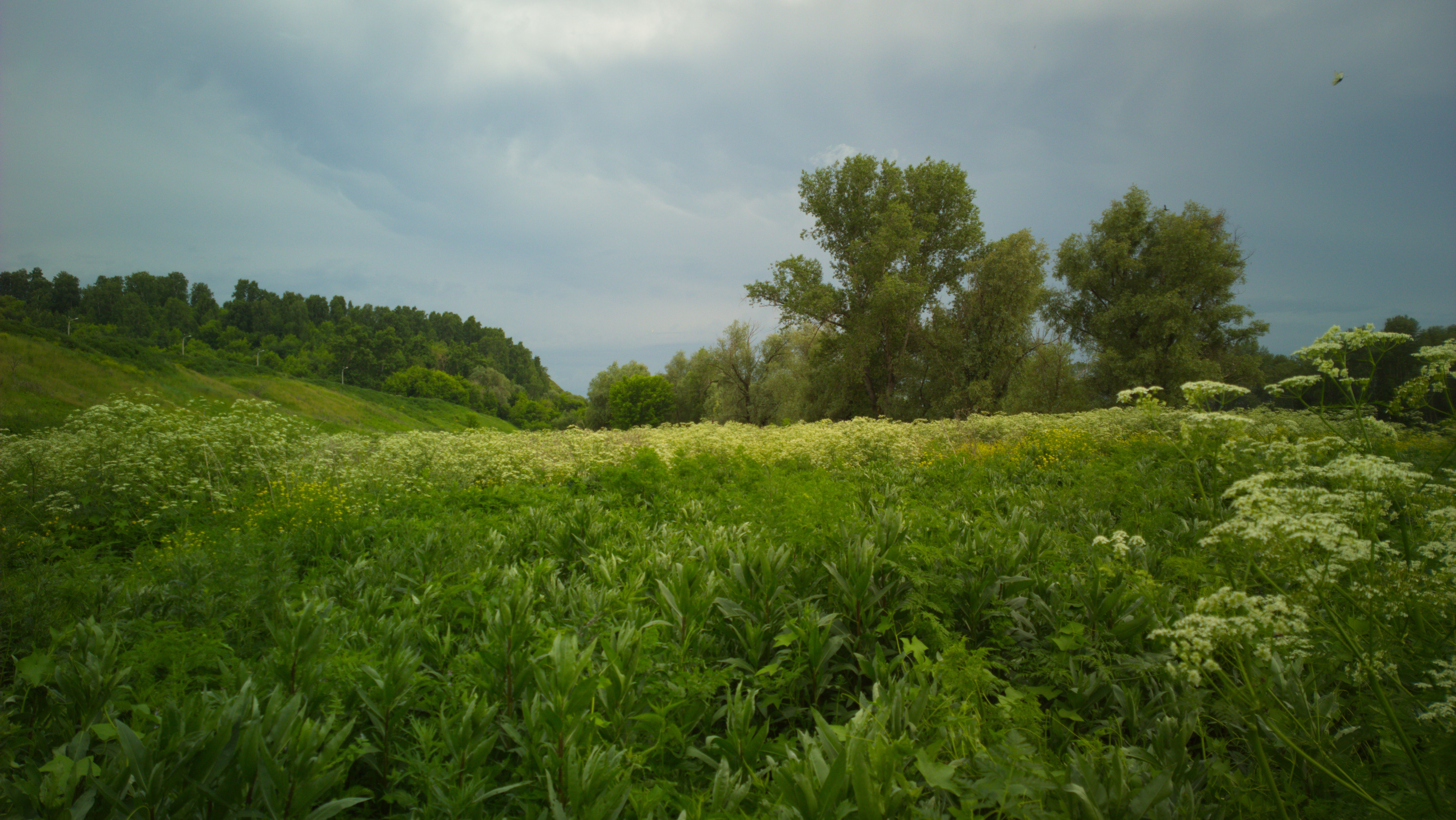
- Landscape in Krasnogorsky District

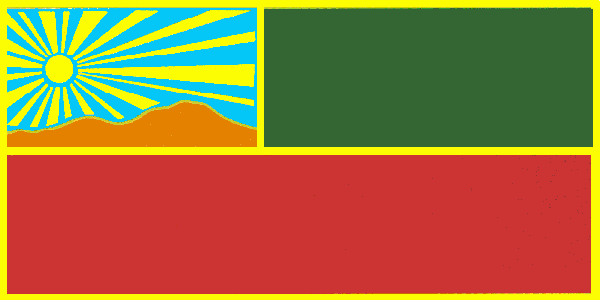
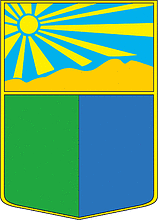
- Flag Coat of arms
- Location of Krasnogorsky District in Altai Krai
- Coordinates: 52°18′N 86°12′E
- Country: Russia
- Federal subject: Altai Krai
- Administrative center: Krasnogorskoye

Area
  - Total: 3,070 km^{2} (1,190 sq mi)

Population (2010 Census)
  - Total: 16,228
  - Density: 5.29/km^{2} (13.7/sq mi)
  - Urban: 0%
  - Rural: 100%

Administrative structure
  - Administrative divisions: 8 selsoviet
  - Inhabited localities: 35 rural localities

Municipal structure
  - Municipally incorporated as: Krasnogorsky Municipal District
  - Municipal divisions: 0 urban settlements, 8 rural settlements
- Time zone: UTC+7 (MSK+4)
- OKTMO ID: 01619000
- Website: www.altairegion22.ru

Krasnogorsky District (Russian: Красного́рский райо́н, Krasnogórskiy raion) is an administrative and municipal district (raion), one of the fifty-nine in Altai Krai, Russia. It is located in the southeast of the krai. The area of the district is 3,070 square kilometers (1,190 sq mi). Its administrative center is the rural locality (a selo) of Krasnogorskoye. Population: 16,228 (2010 census); 19,036 (2002 census); 20,255 (1989 Soviet census). The population of Kranogorskoye accounts for 36.9% of the district's total population.
