= Soloneshnoye =

Rural locality in Soloneshensky District, Russia

Coordinates: 51°39′N 84°19′E

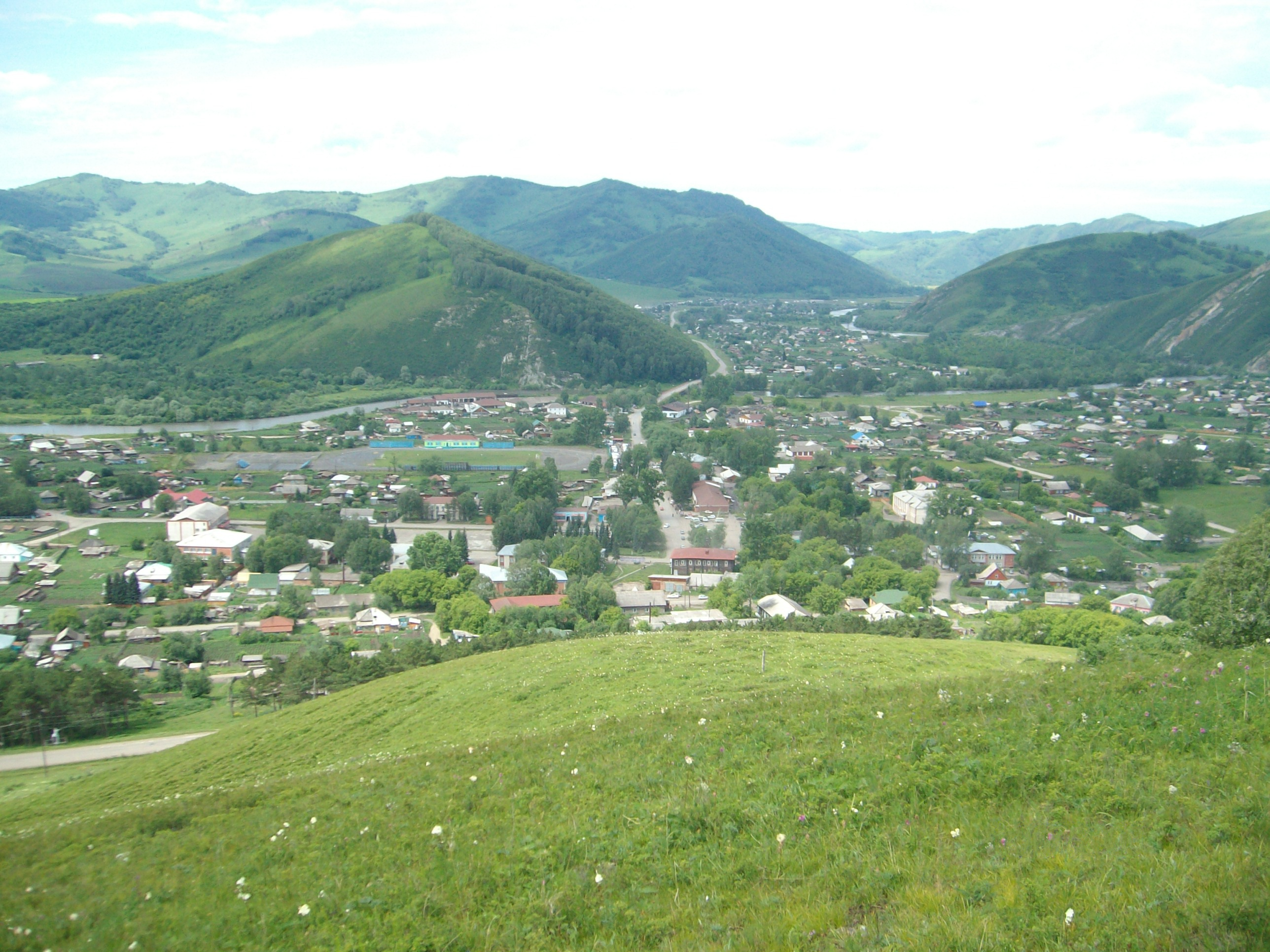
View of Soloneshnoye in the valley of the Anuy river

Soloneshnoye (Russian: Солонешное) is a rural locality (a selo) and the administrative center of Soloneshensky District of Altai Krai, Russia. Population: 4,441 (2010 census); 4,753 (2002 census); 4,623 (1989 Soviet census).
