= Soloneshensky District =

Soloneshensky District Солонешенский район (Russian)
- District
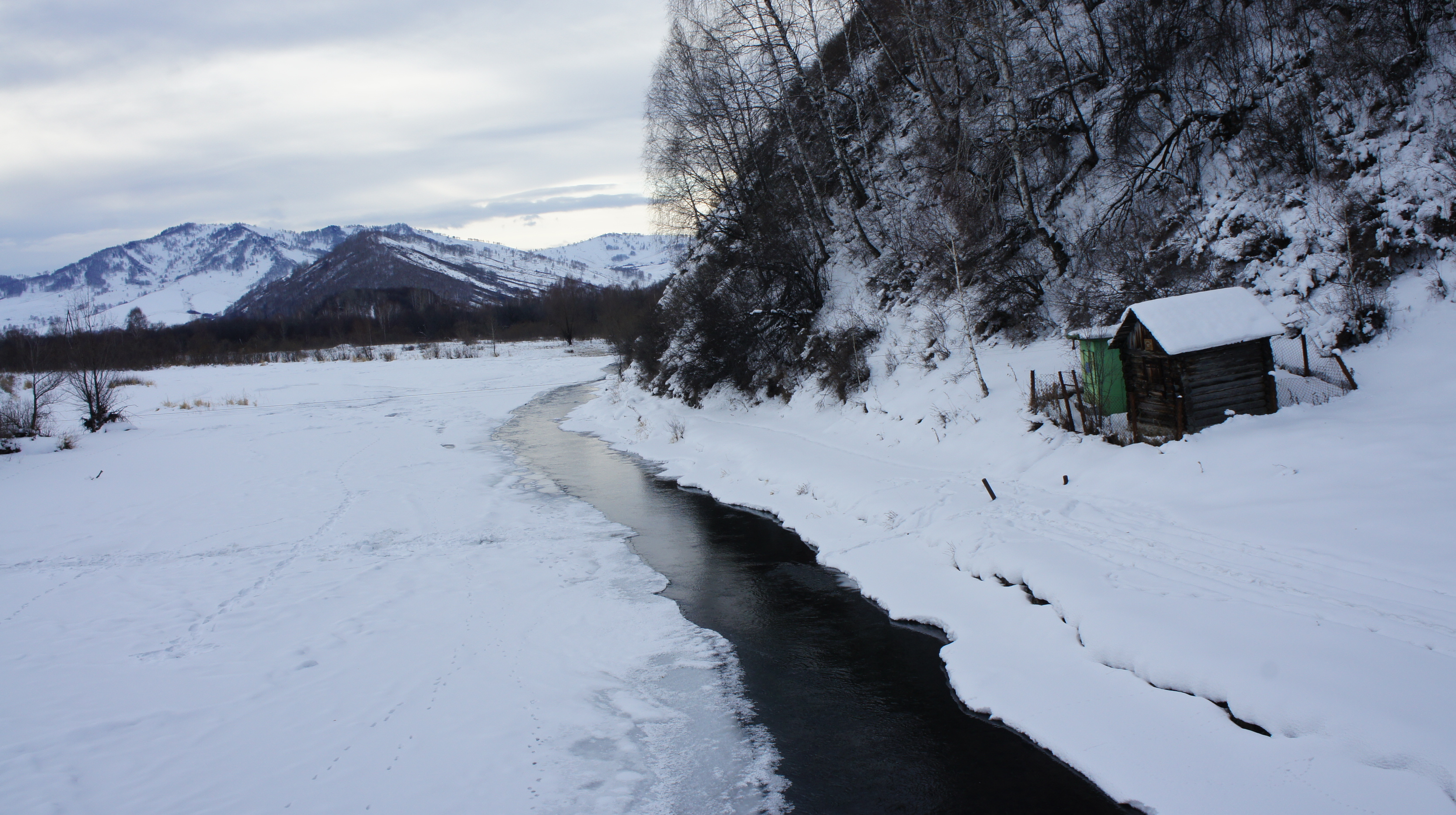
- The Anuy River in Soloneshensky District

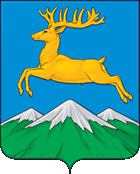
- Flag Coat of arms
- Location of Soloneshensky District in Altai Krai
- Coordinates: 51°39′48″N 84°19′10″E
- Country: Russia
- Federal subject: Altai Krai
- Established: 1924
- Administrative center: Soloneshnoye

Area
  - Total: 3,529 km^{2} (1,363 sq mi)

Population (2010 Census)
  - Total: 10,720
  - Density: 3.038/km^{2} (7.868/sq mi)
  - Urban: 0%
  - Rural: 100%

Administrative structure
  - Administrative divisions: 8 selsoviet
  - Inhabited localities: 31 rural localities

Municipal structure
  - Municipally incorporated as: Soloneshensky Municipal District
  - Municipal divisions: 0 urban settlements, 8 rural settlements
- Time zone: UTC+7 (MSK+4)
- OKTMO ID: 01643000
- Website: http://www.admsln.narod.ru/

Soloneshensky District (Russian: Солоне́шенский райо́н) is an administrative and municipal district (raion), one of the fifty-nine in Altai Krai, Russia. It is located in the southeast of the krai. The area of the district is 3,529 square kilometers (1,363 sq mi). Its administrative center is the rural locality (a selo) of Soloneshnoye. Population: 10,720 (2010 census); 12,436 (2002 census); 13,807 (1989 Soviet census). The population of Soloneshnoye accounts for 41.4% of the district's total population.

A number of prominent archaeological sites are located inside the territory of the raion. In particular, the Denisova Cave, where the remains of the Denisova hominid were first discovered.

== See also ==
- Okladnikov Cave
- Denisova Cave
