= 2023 Altai Krai gubernatorial election =

Regional election in Russian Federation

- 8–10 September 2023
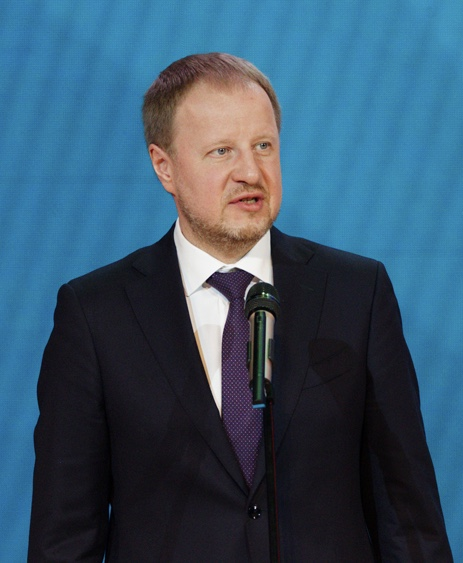
| | | SR-ZP | LDPR |
| Candidate | Viktor Tomenko | Yevgenia Borovikova | Sergey Bulayev |
| Party | United Russia | SR–ZP | LDPR |
| Popular vote | 417,073 | 51,802 | 43,571 |
| Percentage | 76.16% | 9.46% | 7.96% |
Governor before election
Viktor Tomenko
United Russia
Governor-elect
Viktor Tomenko
United Russia

The 2023 Altai Krai gubernatorial election took place on 8–10 September 2023, on common election day. Incumbent governor Viktor Tomenko was re-elected to a second term in office.

== Background ==
Viktor Tomenko, then-prime minister of Krasnoyarsk Krai, was appointed Governor of Altai Krai in May 2018, replacing three-term governor Alexander Karlin. Tomenko won the following gubernatorial election with just 53.61% of the vote, barely above 50% threshold necessary to avoid a second round, over a field of three opponents with a notable absence of a candidate from Communist Party – the largest opposition party in the region. Newly elected governor Tomenko also appointed Karlin, his predecessor, to the Federation Council.

In recent years CPRF made significant gains in Altai Krai. After the 2021 Altai Krai Legislative Assembly election CPRF won 24 seats in the Assembly, an increase of 16 seats, while ruling United Russia lost 11 seats and its majority, winning overall 31 mandates in 68–seat legislative body. In the concurrent 2021 Russian legislative election CPRF Krai Committee first secretary Maria Prusakova won in the Rubtsovsk constituency, gaining the seat from United Russia.

== Candidates ==
In Altai Krai candidates for governor can be nominated only by registered political parties, self-nomination is not possible. However, candidates are not obliged to be members of the nominating party. Candidate for Governor of Altai Krai should be a Russian citizen and at least 30 years old. Candidates for governor should not have a foreign citizenship or residence permit. Each candidate in order to be registered is required to collect at least 7% of signatures of members and heads of municipalities (about 504 signatures — the highest municipal filter in Russia). Also gubernatorial candidates present 3 candidacies to the Federation Council and election winner later appoints one of the presented candidates.

=== Registered ===
- Yevgenia Borovikova (SR–ZP), Member of Altai Krai Legislative Assembly (2016–present)
- Sergey Bulayev (LDPR), Member of Altai Krai Legislative Assembly (2021–present)
- Sergey Malinkovich (Communists of Russia), Member of Altai Krai Legislative Assembly (2021–present), chairman of Communists of Russia party (2022–present), 2014 Nenets AO and 2022 Tambov Oblast gubernatorial candidate
- Viktor Tomenko (United Russia), incumbent Governor of Altai Krai (2018–present)

=== Withdrew after registration ===
- Yelena Khrustalyova (RPPSS), Member of Altai Krai Legislative Assembly (2021–present) (endorsed Tomenko)
- Vladislav Vakayev (New People), head of Altai Krai property fund, former Member of Altai Krai Legislative Assembly (2016–2021) (endorsed Tomenko)

=== Did not file ===
- Vladimir Kirillov (The Greens), ecologist, 2014 gubernatorial candidate, 2018 Novosibirsk Oblast gubernatorial candidate
- Viktor Nagaytsev (Green Alternative), Altai State University associate professor
- Maria Prusakova (CPRF), Member of State Duma (2021–present)

=== Eliminated at United Russia convention ===
- Andrey Osipov, Altai Krai Commissioner for Entrepreneurs' Rights (2020–present)
- Sergey Serov, Member of Altai Krai Legislative Assembly (2000–present)

=== Declined ===
- Yulia Alyoshina (Civic Initiative), former chairwoman of Civic Initiative regional office (2021–2022), lawyer, transgender activist.
- Anton Artsibashev (CPRF), Member of Altai Krai Legislative Assembly (2021–present)
- Nikolai Bondarenko (CPRF), former Member of Saratov Oblast Duma (2017–2022)
- Anzhelika Glazkova (CPRF), Member of State Duma (2021–present) (Note: also was mentioned as potential Communists of Russia candidate)
- Pavel Grudinin (CPRF), director of CJSC "Lenin Sovkhoz", 2018 Russian presidential candidate
- Yury Krasilnikov (CPRF), Member of Barnaul City Duma (2022–present)
- Andrey Krivov (CPRF), Member of Altai Krai Legislative Assembly (2021–present)
- Vyacheslav Laptev (CPRF), Member of Altai Krai Legislative Assembly (2021–present)
- Aleksandr Molotov (SR–ZP), Member of Altai Krai Legislative Assembly (2011–present)
- Vladimir Semyonov (LDPR), Member of Altai Krai Legislative Assembly (2004–2007, 2016–present), former Member of State Duma (2007–2016), 2014 Altai Republic head candidate, 2018 gubernatorial candidate
- Aleksandr Surikov (Communists of Russia), former Ambassador to Belarus (2006–2018), former Governor of Altai Krai (1996–2004)
- Alexander Terentyev (SR–ZP), Member of State Duma (2007–present)
- Sergey Yurchenko (Communists of Russia), former Member of State Duma (2011–2016), 2014 CPRF gubernatorial candidate

=== Candidates for Federation Council ===
Incumbent Senator Alexander Karlin (United Russia) was not renominated.

- Yevgenia Borovikova (SR–ZP):
  - Oleg Boronin, Head of Sibirsky, 2014 gubernatorial candidate
  - Larisa Kolesnikova, Member of Altai Krai Legislative Assembly (2021–present)
  - Aleksandr Molotov, Member of Altai Krai Legislative Assembly (2011–present)
- Sergey Bulayev (LDPR):
  - Vladimir Semyonov, Member of Altai Krai Legislative Assembly (2004–2007, 2016–present), former Member of State Duma (2007–2016), 2014 Altai Republic head candidate, 2018 gubernatorial candidate
  - Aleksey Skosyrsky, Member of Barnaul City Duma (2022–present)
  - Anna Yufereva, Member of Barnaul City Duma (2022–present)
- Sergey Malinkovich (CPCR):
  - Yelena Kurnosova, individual entrepreneur
  - Sergey Matasov, Member of Altai Krai Legislative Assembly (2021–present)
  - Aleksandr Popov, aide to Sergey Malinkovich
- Maria Prusakova (CPRF):
  - Anton Artsibashev, Member of Altai Krai Legislative Assembly (2021–present)
  - Vladimir Gromov, Member of Altai Krai Legislative Assembly (2021–present)
  - Andrey Krivov, Member of Altai Krai Legislative Assembly (2021–present)
- Viktor Tomenko (United Russia):
  - Natalya Kuvshinova, Representative of Governor of Altai Krai in the Altai Krai Legislative Assembly (2021–present), former Member of State Duma (2016–2021)
  - Ivan Loor, Member of State Duma (2016–present)
  - Yury Shamkov, Chairman of the Civic Chamber of Altai Krai (2020–present), former Senator from Altai Krai (2008–2014)
- Vladislav Vakayev (New People):
  - Mikhail Dyrov, businessman
  - Anna Galitskaya, Member of Barnaul City Duma (2023–present)
  - Sergey Puchkov, secretary of New People regional office

== Polls ==
| Fieldwork date | Polling firm | Tomenko | Prusakova | Vakayev | Borovikova | Bulayev | Malinkovich | Khrustalyova | Kirillov | Nagaytsev | None | Undecided | Lead |
|---|---|---|---|---|---|---|---|---|---|---|---|---|---|
| 2 September 2023 | INSOMAR | 68% | – | – | 10% | 13% | 6% | – | – | – | 3% | – | 55% |
| 28 August 2023 | Khrustalyova withdraws from the race | | | | | | | | | | | | |
| 15 August 2023 | Vakayev withdraws from the race | | | | | | | | | | | | |
| 5 August 2023 | Kirillov, Nagaytsev and Prusakova failed to qualify | | | | | | | | | | | | |
| 5–14 July 2023 | Инфоскан | 63% | 7% | 4% | 4% | 3% | 3% | 3% | 1% | 1% | – | 4% | 56% |

== Results ==
Summary of the 8–10 September 2023 Altai Krai gubernatorial election results
| Candidate | Party | Votes | % |
|---|---|---|---|
| Viktor Tomenko (incumbent) | United Russia | 417,073 | 76.16 |
| Yevgenia Borovikova | A Just Russia — For Truth | 51,802 | 9.46 |
| Sergey Bulayev | Liberal Democratic Party | 43,571 | 7.96 |
| Sergey Malinkovich | Communists of Russia | 22,812 | 4.17 |
| Valid votes | | 535,258 | 97.75 |
| Blank ballots | | 12,337 | 2.25 |
| Total | | 547,595 | 100.00 |
| Turnout | | 547,595 | 31.02 |
| Registered voters | | 1,765,281 | 100.00 |

Tomenko appointed former State Duma member Natalya Kuvshinova to the Federation Council, replacing incumbent Alexander Karlin.

== See also ==
- 2023 Russian regional elections
