= 1951 in the Soviet Union =

- Decades: 1930s; 1940s; 1950s; 1960s; 1970s
- See also: History of the Soviet Union; List of years in the Soviet Union

The following lists events that happened during 1951 in the Union of Soviet Socialist Republics.

== Incumbents ==
- General Secretary of the Communist Party of the Soviet Union — Joseph Stalin
- Chairman of the Presidium of the Supreme Soviet of the Soviet Union — Nikolay Shvernik
- Chairman of the Council of Ministers of the Soviet Union — Joseph Stalin

== Births ==
- January 20 — Rouslan Saghabalyan, Russian writer, journalist and screenwriter
- February 3 — Eugenijus Riabovas, Lithuanian football manager
- February 5 — Nikolay Merkushkin, 3rd Governor of Samara Oblast
- February 11 — Vladimir Khabarov, 2nd Governor of Nenets Autonomous Okrug (d. 2010)
- February 19 — Vakhtang Machavariani, composer and conductor (d. 2025)
- February 23 — Avtandil Jorbenadze, 4th State Minister of Georgia (d. 2024)
- February 24 — Aleksandr Nazarov, 1st Governor of Chukotka Autonomous Okrug
- March 1 — Sergei Kourdakov, Soviet KGB agent, later Christian convert (d. 1973)
- March 26 — Aleksey Buldakov, Soviet and Russian movie actor (d. 2019)
- March 30 — Sergey Tereshchenko, 1st Prime Minister of Kazakhstan (d. 2023)
- April 6 — Rita Raave, Estonian stage, television and film actress
- April 14 — Pyotr Mamonov, rock musician (d. 2021)
- April 15 — Vladimir Rayfikesht, 1st Governor of Altai Krai
- April 21 — Aleksandr Laveykin, cosmonaut
- April 30 — Mikhail Kislyuk, 1st Governor of Kemerovo Oblast
- May 3 — Nikolai Yegorov, 4th Governor of Krasnodar Krai (d. 1997)
- May 23 — Anatoly Karpov, Russian chess player
- June 4 — Sergey Mitin, 2nd Governor of Novgorod Oblast
- July 9 — Māris Gailis, 12th Prime Minister of Latvia
- July 11 — Nikolai Patrushev, 5th Director of the Federal Security Service of Russia
- July 25 — Yury Kovalchuk, billionaire businessman and financier
- August 1 — Vladimir Barabanov, 1st and 4th Governor of Bryansk Oblast
- August 4 — Andris Bērziņš, 16th Prime Minister of Latvia
- August 23 — Akhmad Kadyrov, 1st Head of the Chechen Republic (d. 2004)
- August 30 — Gediminas Kirkilas, 13th Prime Minister of Lithuania (d. 2024)
- September 14 — Volodymyr Melnykov, Ukrainian poet, writer, songwriter and composer
- September 15 — Alexander Mikhailov, 3rd Governor of Kursk Oblast (d. 2020)
- September 17 — Mārtiņš Brauns, Latvian composer (d. 2021)
- September 21 — Aslan Maskhadov, 3rd President of Ichkeria (d. 2005)
- October 4 — Bakhytzhan Kanapyanov, Kazakh poet
- October 15 — Rafael Vaganian, Armenian chess player
- October 21 — Dmitry Gayev, Russian civil servant (d. 2012)
- October 23 — Vyacheslav Chanov, Russian football coach and goalkeeper
- October 27 — Mikhail Kozlov, Acting Governor of Altai Krai
- October 29 — Alexander Karlin, 5th Governor of Altai Krai
- November 15 — Alexander Bortnikov, 6th Director of the Federal Security Service of Russia
- November 27 — Ivars Godmanis, 10th Prime Minister of Latvia
- December 3 — Ivan Cherednik, mathematician
- December 19 — Nikolay Volkov, 1st Governor of Jewish Autonomous Oblast
- December 25 — Alexander Volkov, 1st Head of the Udmurt Republic (d. 2017)
- December 30 — Alexey Barinov, 4th Governor of Nenets Autonomous Okrug

== Deaths ==
- April 2 — Mikhail Vladimirsky, politician and revolutionary (b. 1874)
- May 1 — Klymentiy Sheptytsky, Orthodox priest (b. 1869)
- May 29 — Mikhail Borodin, revolutionary and Comintern agent (b. 1884)
- June 16 — Pyotr Pavlenko, writer, screenwriter and war correspondent (b. 1899)
- November 3 — Alexei Badayev, functionary (b. 1883)
- November 5 — Agrippina Vaganova, ballerina (b. 1879)
- December 31 — Maxim Litvinov, 2nd People's Commissar for Foreign Affairs of the Soviet Union (b. 1876)

== See also ==
- 1951 in fine arts of the Soviet Union
- List of Soviet films of 1951
