= 2026 Altai Krai legislative election =

Regional legislative election in Russia

- 18–20 September 2026

All 68 seats in the Legislative Assembly 35 seats needed for a majority
- Turnout: 44.08% ▲4.36 pp
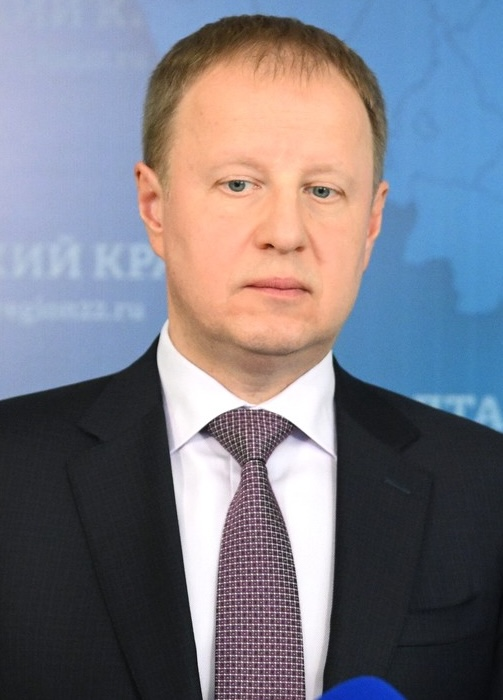

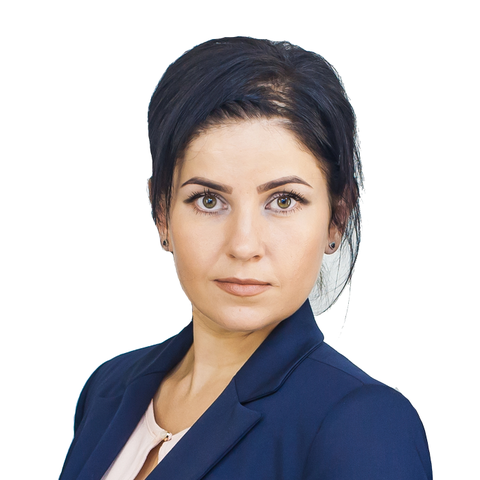

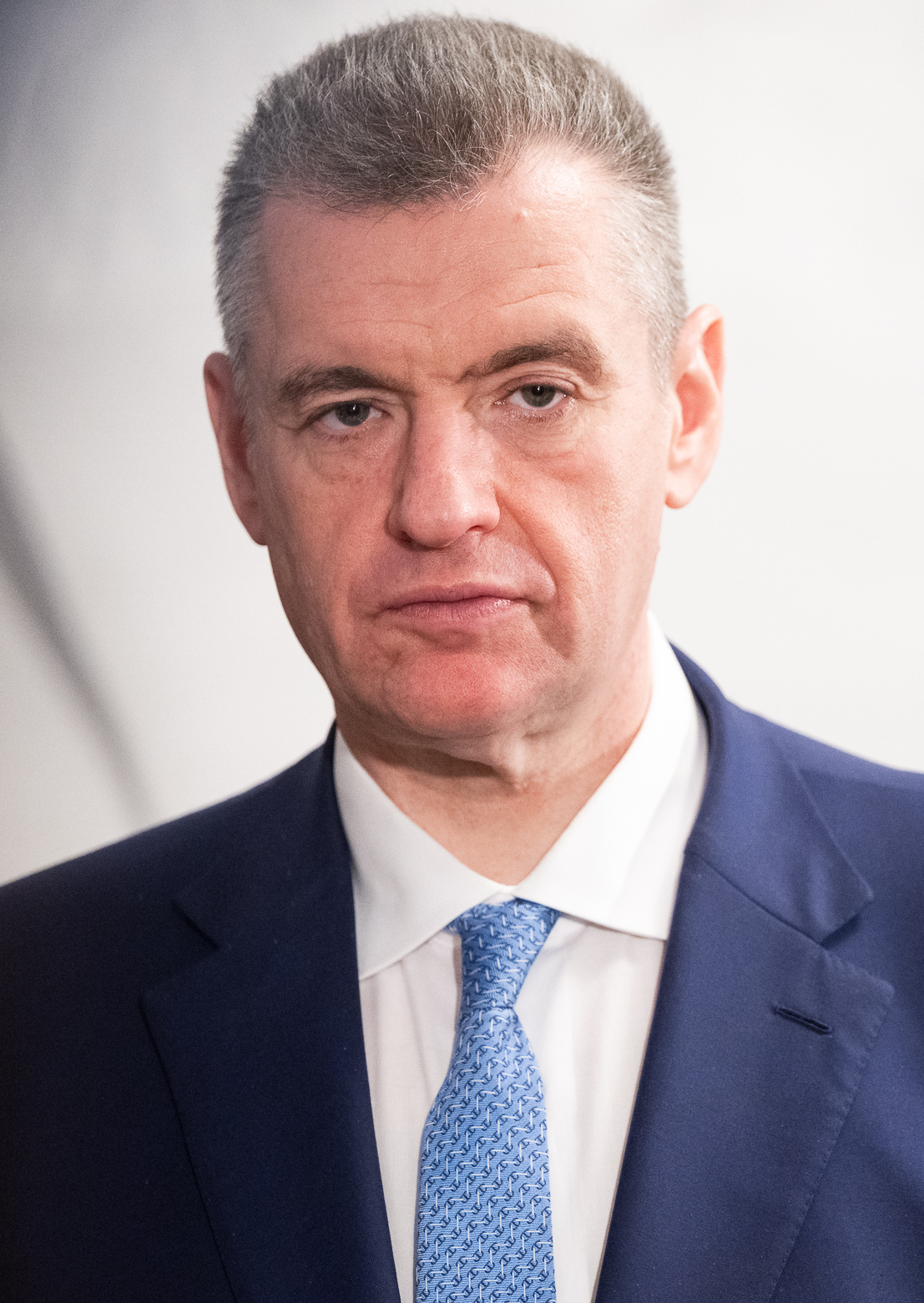

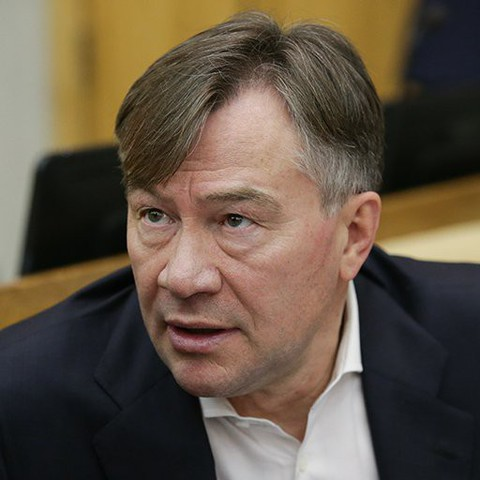
	Majority party	Minority party	Third party
Candidate	Viktor Tomenko	Maria Prusakova	Leonid Slutsky
Party	United Russia	CPRF	LDPR
Last election	34.33%, 31 seats	24.04%, 24 seats	10.72%, 4 seats
Seats won	51	7	4
Seat change	▲20	▼17	Steady
Popular vote	320,062	136,160	90,968
Percentage	42.03%	17.88%	11.94%
Swing	▲7.70 pp	▼6.16 pp	▲1.22 pp
	Fourth party	Fifth party	Sixth party
	NL		RPPSS
Candidate	Maksim Bannykh	Alexander Terentyev	Yelena Khrustalyova
Party	New People	A Just Russia	Party of Pensioners
Last election	Did not participate	13.68%, 5 seats	Did not participate
Seats won	4	2	0
Seat change	Did not participate	▼3	Did not participate
Popular vote	80,385	52,889	33,478
Percentage	10.56%	6.94%	4.40%
Swing	Did not participate	▼6.74 pp	Did not participate
Chairman before election
Aleksandr Romanenko
United Russia
Elected Chairman
Aleksandr Romanenko
United Russia
Senator before election
Victor Zobnev
United Russia
Senator after election
Victor Zobnev
United Russia

The 2026 Altai Krai Legislative Assembly election took place on 18–20 September 2026, on common election day, coinciding with the 2026 Russian legislative election. All 68 seats in the Legislative Assembly were up for re-election.

United Russia won an overwhelming majority in the Legislative Assembly, receiving 42% of the vote and gaining 15 single-mandate constituencies (winning all 34 of them). Communist Party of the Russian Federation suffered major defeat, losing all single-mandate constituencies, which reduced CPRF faction to just 5 deputies. A Just Russia lost half of its vote share but was able to retain its representation, while Communists of Russia dropped below 5% threshold. New People entered the Legislative Assembly for the first time, gaining 4 seats and winning 10.6% of the vote.

== Electoral system ==
Under current election laws, the Legislative Assembly is elected for a term of five years, with parallel voting. 34 seats are elected by party-list proportional representation with a 5% electoral threshold, with the other half elected in 34 single-member constituencies by first-past-the-post voting. Seats in the proportional part are allocated using the Imperiali quota, modified to ensure that every party list, which passes the threshold, receives at least one mandate.

== Candidates ==
=== Party lists ===
To register regional lists of candidates, parties need to collect 0.5% of signatures of all registered voters in Altai Krai.

The following parties were relieved from the necessity to collect signatures:

- United Russia
- Communist Party of the Russian Federation
- Liberal Democratic Party of Russia
- A Just Russia
- New People
- Communists of Russia

№	Party	Krai-wide list	Candidates	Territorial groups	Status
1	United Russia	Viktor Tomenko • Aleksandr Romanenko • Artyom Shamkov	173	34	Registered
2	Liberal Democratic Party	Leonid Slutsky • Sergey Bulayev • Dmitry Shor	131	34	Registered
3	A Just Russia	Alexander Terentyev • Yevgenia Borovikova • Aleksandr Molotov	144	34	Registered
4	Communists of Russia	Lyudmila Tsivilyova • Andrey Sarkisyan • Vladimir Kozlovsky	100	34	Registered
5	Party of Pensioners	Yelena Khrustalyova • Aleksandr Lazarev • Vyacheslav Laptev	113	34	Registered
6	New People	Maksim Bannykh • Nikita Fedyunin • Anna Galitskaya	87	34	Registered
7	Communist Party	Maria Prusakova • Andrey Krivov • Sergey Nemchinov	109	34	Registered

New People and Russian Party of Pensioners for Social Justice took part in the Altai Krai legislative election for the first time.

=== Single-mandate constituencies ===
34 single-mandate constituencies were formed in Altai Krai. To register candidates in single-mandate constituencies need to collect 3% of signatures of registered voters in the constituency.

Number of candidates in single-mandate constituencies
Party	Candidates	
Party	Nominated	Registered
United Russia	34	34
Communist Party	33	33
A Just Russia	33	31
Communists of Russia	35	34
Liberal Democratic Party	34	31
New People	33	30
Party of Pensioners	24	8
Yabloko	1	0
Independent	1	0
Total	228	201

== Results ==
=== Results by party lists ===
Summary of the 18–20 September 2026 Altai Krai Legislative Assembly election results
Party	Party list					Constituency		Total	
Party	Votes	%	±pp	Seats	+/–	Seats	+/–	Seats	+/–
United Russia	320,062	42.03	▲7.70	17	▲5	34	▲15	51	▲20
Communist Party	136,160	17.88	▼6.16	7	▼2	0	▼15	7	▼17
Liberal Democratic Party	90,968	11.94	▲1.22	4	Steady	0	Steady	4	Steady
New People	80,385	10.56	New	4	New	0	New	4	New
A Just Russia	52,889	6.94	▼6.74	2	▼3	0	Steady	2	▼3
Party of Pensioners	33,478	4.40	New	0	New	0	New	0	New
Communists of Russia	32,343	4.25	▼7.83	0	▼4	0	Steady	0	▼4
Invalid ballots	15,285	2.01	▼1.44	—	—	—	—	—	—
Total	761,570	100.00	—	34	Steady	34	Steady	68	Steady
Turnout	761,570	44.08	▲4.36	—	—	—	—	—	—
Registered voters	1,727,888	100.00	—	—	—	—	—	—	—

Aleksandr Romanenko (United Russia) was re-elected as Chairman of the Legislative Assembly, while incumbent Senator Victor Zobnev (United Russia) was re-appointed to the Federation Council.

=== Results in single-member constituencies ===
==== District 1 ====
Summary of the 18–20 September 2026 Altai Krai Legislative Assembly election in District 1
Candidate	Party	Votes	%
Igor Vikhlyanov	United Russia	7,808	34.16%
Igor Alshansky	Liberal Democratic Party	4,500	19.69%
Yelizaveta Chuvasheva	Communist Party	3,577	15.65%
Natalya Litau	Communists of Russia	2,975	13.02%
Vyacheslav Freind	A Just Russia	1,831	8.01%
Aleksey Svechnikov	New People	1,387	6.07%
Total		22,856	100%

==== District 2 ====
Summary of the 18–20 September 2026 Altai Krai Legislative Assembly election in District 2
Candidate	Party	Votes	%
Nikita Kozhanov	United Russia	12,545	47.55%
Tatyana Likhacheva	Communist Party	4,447	16.85%
Aleksandr Goncharov	Liberal Democratic Party	3,987	15.11%
Aleksandr Kiselyov	A Just Russia	2,119	8.03%
Andrey Davydov	New People	1,690	6.41%
Aleksandr Kuzgan	Communists of Russia	1,096	4.15%
Total		26,385	100%

==== District 3 ====
Summary of the 18–20 September 2026 Altai Krai Legislative Assembly election in District 3
Candidate	Party	Votes	%
Pyotr Boos	United Russia	12,406	54.04%
Yevgeny Braun	Communists of Russia	2,398	10.45%
Darya Alyabyeva	New People	2,255	9.82%
Pavel Petryashev	Communist Party	2,151	9.37%
Andrey Ternovoy	A Just Russia	1,673	7.29%
Kirill Maksimov	Liberal Democratic Party	1,451	6.32%
Total		22,956	100%

==== District 4 ====
Summary of the 18–20 September 2026 Altai Krai Legislative Assembly election in District 4
Candidate	Party	Votes	%
Aleksey Krivenko	United Russia	16,139	55.04%
Vyacheslav Khaydukov	Communist Party	5,389	18.38%
Natalya Dik	Communists of Russia	2,589	8.83%
Vladimir Igoshin	A Just Russia	2,408	8.21%
Ksenia Tukalo	New People	2,195	7.49%
Total		29,323	100%

==== District 5 ====
Summary of the 18–20 September 2026 Altai Krai Legislative Assembly election in District 5
Candidate	Party	Votes	%
Aleksandr Kuzmenko	United Russia	9,134	40.27%
Yevgenia Borovikova	A Just Russia	3,617	15.95%
Sergey Sergiyenkov	Communist Party	2,755	12.15%
Viktor Zatonskikh	Liberal Democratic Party	2,077	9.16%
Sergey Oreshkov	New People	1,786	7.87%
Tamara Bezhan	Party of Pensioners	1,634	7.20%
Ilya Ryabtsev	Communists of Russia	1,018	4.49%
Total		22,684	100%

==== District 6 ====
Summary of the 18–20 September 2026 Altai Krai Legislative Assembly election in District 6
Candidate	Party	Votes	%
Sergey Serov (incumbent)	United Russia	10,410	39.28%
Mikhail Selivanov	Communist Party	6,432	24.27%
Lyudmila Pleshkova	A Just Russia	3,008	11.35%
Larisa Lavrenova	Communists of Russia	2,401	9.06%
Mikhail Spirin	New People	1,951	7.36%
Maksim Podolyakin	Liberal Democratic Party	1,725	6.51%
Total		26,502	100%

==== District 7 ====
Summary of the 18–20 September 2026 Altai Krai Legislative Assembly election in District 7
Candidate	Party	Votes	%
Irina Solntseva (incumbent)	United Russia	10,426	42.95%
Natalya Zimina (incumbent)	Communist Party	4,604	18.97%
Anna Demchenko	New People	3,075	12.67%
Tatyana Koneva	Liberal Democratic Party	2,399	9.88%
Aleksandra Zekhova	Communists of Russia	1,708	7.04%
Rodion Saprykin	A Just Russia	1,322	5.45%
Total		24,274	100%

==== District 8 ====
Summary of the 18–20 September 2026 Altai Krai Legislative Assembly election in District 8
Candidate	Party	Votes	%
Yury Matveyko (incumbent)	United Russia	9,817	40.22%
Yulia Krivenko	Communist Party	3,800	15.57%
Sergey Mekhin	A Just Russia	3,549	14.54%
Ivan Nechayev	New People	2,816	11.54%
Denis Krakovetsky	Liberal Democratic Party	2,050	8.40%
Bakhiddin Gasanov	Communists of Russia	1,686	6.91%
Total		24,411	100%

==== District 9 ====
Summary of the 18–20 September 2026 Altai Krai Legislative Assembly election in District 9
Candidate	Party	Votes	%
Vladimir Popov	United Russia	13,393	47.80%
Ivan Orlov	Communist Party	5,539	19.77%
Ivan Alyrchikov	Liberal Democratic Party	4,547	16.23%
Sergey Zyabkin	A Just Russia	2,212	7.90%
Oleg Davydov	Communists of Russia	1,725	6.16%
Total		28,016	100%

==== District 10 ====
Summary of the 18–20 September 2026 Altai Krai Legislative Assembly election in District 10
Candidate	Party	Votes	%
Aleksandr Romanenko	United Russia	9,839	45.84%
Pyotr Chichikin	Communist Party	3,416	15.91%
Ivan Peshekhanov	A Just Russia	2,978	13.87%
Denis Cherdantsev	Communists of Russia	2,046	9.53%
Yevgeny Tikhonov	Liberal Democratic Party	1,715	7.99%
Nikita Fedyunin	New People	968	4.51%
Total		21,465	100%

==== District 11 ====
Summary of the 18–20 September 2026 Altai Krai Legislative Assembly election in District 11
Candidate	Party	Votes	%
Maksim Kochev (incumbent)	United Russia	9,835	40.45%
Yevgeny Sergeyev	Communist Party	4,604	18.94%
Yevgeny Burtsev	Communists of Russia	4,123	16.96%
Sergey Titov	Liberal Democratic Party	2,148	8.84%
Yury Meyer	A Just Russia	1,649	6.78%
Pavel Slonov	New People	1,269	5.22%
Total		24,311	100%

==== District 12 ====
Summary of the 18–20 September 2026 Altai Krai Legislative Assembly election in District 12
Candidate	Party	Votes	%
Vladimir Peleganchuk	United Russia	8,896	37.23%
Viktoria Vostrikova	Liberal Democratic Party	3,797	15.89%
Andrey Belykh	Communist Party	3,737	15.64%
Yelena Alyabyeva	Communists of Russia	2,552	10.68%
Yevgeny Shchetinin	A Just Russia	2,166	9.07%
Ivan Romanikhin	New People	2,042	8.55%
Total		23,894	100%

==== District 13 ====
Summary of the 18–20 September 2026 Altai Krai Legislative Assembly election in District 13
Candidate	Party	Votes	%
Konstantin Yezhov	United Russia	11,828	49.47%
Irina Ushakova	New People	3,657	15.29%
Pavel Parfenyuk	Communist Party	2,878	12.04%
Anatoly Lykov	Liberal Democratic Party	2,550	10.66%
Aleksandr Krapivin	Communists of Russia	2,239	9.36%
Total		23,910	100%

==== District 14 ====
Summary of the 18–20 September 2026 Altai Krai Legislative Assembly election in District 14
Candidate	Party	Votes	%
Tatiana Ilyuchenko (incumbent)	United Russia	9,186	39.72%
Aleksey Borisov	Liberal Democratic Party	3,926	16.98%
Valentina Korobova	Communist Party	3,544	15.33%
Mikhail Bashkatov	New People	3,501	15.14%
Marina Bobkova	Communists of Russia	2,334	10.09%
Total		23,125	100%

==== District 15 ====
Summary of the 18–20 September 2026 Altai Krai Legislative Assembly election in District 15
Candidate	Party	Votes	%
Vadim Smagin (incumbent)	United Russia	17,013	62.73%
Vladislav Rettich	Communist Party	3,193	11.77%
Aleksandr Lukashenko	Liberal Democratic Party	2,364	8.72%
Aleksandr Kuzayev	A Just Russia	1,606	5.92%
Aleksey Surnin	New People	1,229	4.53%
Igor Ozornykh	Communists of Russia	1,191	4.39%
Total		27,119	100%

==== District 16 ====
Summary of the 18–20 September 2026 Altai Krai Legislative Assembly election in District 16
Candidate	Party	Votes	%
Igor Panarin (incumbent)	United Russia	12,768	47.53%
Vladimir Safronov	Communist Party	4,961	18.47%
Ivan Kartashov	Communists of Russia	3,296	12.27%
Yevgeny Barybin	Liberal Democratic Party	3,104	11.55%
Artyom Moskvin	A Just Russia	1,949	7.26%
Total		26,864	100%

==== District 17 ====
Summary of the 18–20 September 2026 Altai Krai Legislative Assembly election in District 17
Candidate	Party	Votes	%
Sergey Bocharov	United Russia	6,308	32.98%
Oleg Belkin	A Just Russia	4,064	21.25%
Ivan Prilukov	Communists of Russia	3,694	19.32%
Svetlana Pavlova	New People	2,584	13.51%
Anna Yufereva	Liberal Democratic Party	1,872	9.79%
Total		19,125	100%

==== District 18 ====
Summary of the 18–20 September 2026 Altai Krai Legislative Assembly election in District 18
Candidate	Party	Votes	%
Aleksandr Safonov	United Russia	8,007	33.07%
Marina Ignatyeva	Liberal Democratic Party	3,798	15.69%
Svetlana Kerber	Communist Party	3,686	15.22%
Vladimir Zhdanov	New People	3,228	13.33%
Aleksey Durov	A Just Russia	3,141	12.97%
Viktoria Ibel	Communists of Russia	1,637	6.76%
Total		24,212	100%

==== District 19 ====
Summary of the 18–20 September 2026 Altai Krai Legislative Assembly election in District 19
Candidate	Party	Votes	%
Mikhail Razlivinsky	United Russia	5,768	26.51%
Lyudmila Klyushnikova (incumbent)	Communist Party	4,537	20.85%
Aleksey Karelin	New People	4,160	19.12%
Larisa Kolesnikova	A Just Russia	2,476	11.38%
Yelena Korol	Liberal Democratic Party	1,485	6.82%
Tatyana Arbuzova	Party of Pensioners	1,455	6.69%
Irina Klyuchnikova	Communists of Russia	1,231	5.66%
Total		21,759	100%

==== District 20 ====
Summary of the 18–20 September 2026 Altai Krai Legislative Assembly election in District 20
Candidate	Party	Votes	%
Aleksandr Loktev (incumbent)	United Russia	7,881	35.91%
Yulia Gorkovenko	New People	5,300	24.15%
Vyacheslav Pochatov	Communist Party	4,098	18.67%
Aleksandr Kuznetsov	A Just Russia	2,514	11.46%
Maksim Guzhev	Communists of Russia	1,611	7.34%
Total		21,944	100%

==== District 21 ====
Summary of the 18–20 September 2026 Altai Krai Legislative Assembly election in District 21
Candidate	Party	Votes	%
Irina Lazarenko	United Russia	7,555	35.21%
Stanislav Adodin	Communist Party	3,851	17.95%
Igor Strantsov	New People	3,319	15.47%
Zakhar Torychev	A Just Russia	2,146	10.00%
Anna Gavrilova	Liberal Democratic Party	2,104	9.81%
Aleksey Admov	Communists of Russia	1,923	8.96%
Total		21,458	100%

==== District 22 ====
Summary of the 18–20 September 2026 Altai Krai Legislative Assembly election in District 22
Candidate	Party	Votes	%
Dmitry Denisov	United Russia	7,172	37.66%
Tatyana Grosheva	Communist Party	3,554	18.66%
Artyom Kilmyashkin	New People	2,627	13.79%
Sergey Stremilov	Liberal Democratic Party	2,343	12.30%
Mikhail Krivoshein	A Just Russia	1,520	7.98%
Yulia Gaaze	Communists of Russia	1,326	6.96%
Total		19,044	100%

==== District 23 ====
Summary of the 18–20 September 2026 Altai Krai Legislative Assembly election in District 23
Candidate	Party	Votes	%
Sergey Pisarev (incumbent)	United Russia	10,211	48.75%
Yevgeny Isupov	Communist Party	2,870	13.70%
Vladimir Mzhelsky	A Just Russia	2,143	10.23%
Gulshan Garibova	New People	2,083	9.94%
Dmitry Skosyrsky	Liberal Democratic Party	1,636	7.81%
Darya Vedyapina	Communists of Russia	1,494	7.13%
Total		20,947	100%

==== District 24 ====
Summary of the 18–20 September 2026 Altai Krai Legislative Assembly election in District 24
Candidate	Party	Votes	%
Dmitry Aganov	United Russia	6,366	31.00%
Sergey Pilyugin	Communist Party	3,759	18.31%
Pavel Konovod	New People	3,186	15.52%
Yelena Grigoryeva	Party of Pensioners	2,293	11.17%
Dmitry Pasko	Liberal Democratic Party	1,973	9.61%
Stepan Lyutov	A Just Russia	1,311	6.38%
Pavel Lytkin	Communists of Russia	1,271	6.19%
Total		20,534	100%

==== District 25 ====
Summary of the 18–20 September 2026 Altai Krai Legislative Assembly election in District 25
Candidate	Party	Votes	%
Ivan Ognev	United Russia	8,060	40.21%
Igor Galkin (incumbent)	Communist Party	3,142	15.68%
Tatyana Aryutkina	New People	2,489	12.42%
Lyudmila Suslova	A Just Russia	1,882	9.39%
Vladimir Myakishev	Liberal Democratic Party	1,855	9.26%
Ilya Voronov	Communists of Russia	1,048	5.23%
Natalya Streltsova	Party of Pensioners	958	4.78%
Total		20,043	100%

==== District 26 ====
Summary of the 18–20 September 2026 Altai Krai Legislative Assembly election in District 26
Candidate	Party	Votes	%
Aleksandr Lisitsyn	United Russia	7,960	40.90%
Dmitry Moiseyev (incumbent)	Communist Party	3,263	16.77%
Olga Pisanova	New People	2,799	14.38%
Aleksandr Nikolaychik	A Just Russia	2,131	10.95%
Anastasia Metla	Liberal Democratic Party	1,802	9.26%
Nikolay Maltsev	Communists of Russia	1,036	5.32%
Total		19,460	100%

==== District 27 ====
Summary of the 18–20 September 2026 Altai Krai Legislative Assembly election in District 27
Candidate	Party	Votes	%
Vladislav Vakayev	United Russia	7,136	35.35%
Anton Artsibashev (incumbent)	Communist Party	3,835	19.00%
Dmitry Kalashnikov	New People	3,204	15.87%
Oksana Molodykh	A Just Russia	2,999	14.86%
Roza Alborova	Liberal Democratic Party	1,318	6.53%
Ksenia Aistova	Communists of Russia	1,189	5.89%
Total		20,185	100%

==== District 28 ====
Summary of the 18–20 September 2026 Altai Krai Legislative Assembly election in District 28
Candidate	Party	Votes	%
Vyacheslav Pereryadov	United Russia	7,760	37.04%
Yury Kropotin (incumbent)	Communist Party	3,892	18.58%
Ilya Kononov	New People	3,205	15.30%
Aleksandr Nagovitsin	Liberal Democratic Party	2,325	11.10%
Aleksandr Gorbatykh	Communists of Russia	1,642	7.84%
Yevgenia Sugatova	Party of Pensioners	1,528	7.29%
Total		20,949	100%

==== District 29 ====
Summary of the 18–20 September 2026 Altai Krai Legislative Assembly election in District 29
Candidate	Party	Votes	%
Yevgeny Nosenko	United Russia	6,506	30.62%
Aleksandr Murzin	Communist Party	4,007	18.86%
Vyacheslav Trubnikov	New People	3,421	16.10%
Aleksandr Molotov	A Just Russia	2,966	13.96%
Dmitry Rybkin	Liberal Democratic Party	2,124	10.00%
Yevgeny Moiseyev	Communists of Russia	1,772	8.34%
Total		21,246	100%

==== District 30 ====
Summary of the 18–20 September 2026 Altai Krai Legislative Assembly election in District 30
Candidate	Party	Votes	%
Andrey Abramov (incumbent)	United Russia	7,083	39.37%
Konstantin Kovalev	Communist Party	3,657	20.32%
Anton Zyryanov	New People	1,922	10.68%
Tatyana Baranova	Liberal Democratic Party	1,640	9.11%
Aleksey Khromin	A Just Russia	1,110	6.17%
Grigory Kovalev	Communists of Russia	1,069	5.94%
Yulia Butakova	Party of Pensioners	1,046	5.81%
Total		17,993	100%

==== District 31 ====
Summary of the 18–20 September 2026 Altai Krai Legislative Assembly election in District 31
Candidate	Party	Votes	%
Sergey Lareykin	United Russia	7,382	37.13%
Stanislav Bryksin	Communist Party	3,313	16.67%
Dmitry Nesterov	New People	2,678	13.47%
Olga Andreyeva	A Just Russia	2,317	11.66%
Marina Pozdnyak	Liberal Democratic Party	1,659	8.35%
Aleksandr Babayev	Communists of Russia	1,344	6.76%
Nikolay Chinyayev	Party of Pensioners	661	3.33%
Total		19,879	100%

==== District 32 ====
Summary of the 18–20 September 2026 Altai Krai Legislative Assembly election in District 32
Candidate	Party	Votes	%
Grigory Bakhtin (incumbent)	United Russia	5,527	31.88%
Vladimir Balakhnin	Communist Party	3,442	19.85%
Anna Galitskaya	New People	2,430	14.02%
Aleksandr Kazantsev	Liberal Democratic Party	1,825	10.53%
Olga Gnezdilova	Party of Pensioners	1,242	7.16%
Aleksey Yakunin	A Just Russia	1,225	7.07%
Aleksandr Balakhnin	Communists of Russia	1,194	6.89%
Total		17,336	100%

==== District 33 ====
Summary of the 18–20 September 2026 Altai Krai Legislative Assembly election in District 33
Candidate	Party	Votes	%
Sergey Chernoivanov	United Russia	5,641	33.12%
Andrey Chernobay (incumbent)	Communist Party	5,581	32.76%
Irina Shudra	Liberal Democratic Party	3,009	17.66%
Yury Klimov	Communists of Russia	1,216	7.14%
Andrey Sekreta	A Just Russia	1,139	6.69%
Total		17,034	100%

==== District 34 ====
Summary of the 18–20 September 2026 Altai Krai Legislative Assembly election in District 34
Candidate	Party	Votes	%
Victor Zobnev	United Russia	5,840	37.86%
Lyudmila Mukhortova	Communist Party	3,725	24.15%
Sergey Davydov	Liberal Democratic Party	2,347	15.22%
Olga Maskayeva	Communists of Russia	1,573	10.20%
Ruslan Maltsev	A Just Russia	1,453	9.42%
Total		15,425	100%

=== Members ===
Incumbent deputies are highlighted with bold, elected members who declined to take a seat are marked with ~~strikethrough~~.

Constituency
No.	Member	Party
1	Igor Vikhlyanov	United Russia
2	Nikita Kozhanov	United Russia
3	Pyotr Boos	United Russia
4	Aleksey Krivenko	United Russia
5	Aleksandr Kuzmenko	United Russia
6	Sergey Serov	United Russia
7	Irina Solntseva	United Russia
8	Yury Matveyko	United Russia
9	Vladimir Popov	United Russia
10	Aleksandr Romanenko	United Russia
11	Maksim Kochev	United Russia
12	Vladimir Peleganchuk	United Russia
13	Konstantin Yezhov	United Russia
14	Tatiana Ilyuchenko	United Russia
15	Vadim Smagin	United Russia
16	Igor Panarin	United Russia
17	Sergey Bocharov	United Russia
18	Aleksandr Safonov	United Russia
19	Mikhail Razlivinsky	United Russia
20	Aleksandr Loktev	United Russia
21	Irina Lazarenko	United Russia
22	Dmitry Denisov	United Russia
23	Sergey Pisarev	United Russia
24	Dmitry Aganov	United Russia
25	Ivan Ognev	United Russia
26	Aleksandr Lisitsyn	United Russia
27	Vladislav Vakayev	United Russia
28	Vyacheslav Pereryadov	United Russia
29	Yevgeny Nosenko	United Russia
30	Andrey Abramov	United Russia
31	Sergey Lareykin	United Russia
32	Grigory Bakhtin	United Russia
33	Sergey Chernoivanov	United Russia
34	Victor Zobnev	United Russia

Party lists
Member	Party
~~Viktor Tomenko~~	United Russia
Artyom Shamkov	United Russia
Sergey Livadniy	United Russia
Vasily Roshchupkin	United Russia
Anton Teslin	United Russia
~~Dmitry Belyayev~~	United Russia
Vladimir Gromov	United Russia
Konstantin Molchanov	United Russia
Ksenia Belousova	United Russia
~~Igor Levin~~	United Russia
Alina Bushuyeva	United Russia
Ivan Gladkikh	United Russia
Vladimir Leshchenko	United Russia
Aleksandr Trautwein	United Russia
Andrey Maksimov	United Russia
Aleksandr Berestennikov	United Russia
~~Pavel Avkopashvili~~	United Russia
~~Dmitry Rozhdestvensky~~	United Russia
~~Roman Kuranov~~	United Russia
~~Tatyana Basargina~~	United Russia
~~Larisa Chaplygina~~	United Russia
~~Valentina Belozerova~~	United Russia
Pavel Kravchenko	United Russia
Andrey Shalygin	United Russia
~~Lidia Drugova~~	United Russia
~~Igor Meliyev~~	United Russia
~~Yelena Tarasova~~	United Russia
~~Konstantin Laptev~~	United Russia
~~Roman Ilyin~~	United Russia
~~Larisa Vyalkova~~	United Russia
~~Nikolay Savinsky~~	United Russia
~~Sergey Yezdin~~	United Russia
~~Galina Buymova~~	United Russia
~~Yelena Metel~~	United Russia
~~Inna Ryazanova~~	United Russia
~~Stanislav Deryagin~~	United Russia
~~Andrey Goncharov~~	United Russia
~~Nadezhda Markova~~	United Russia
Yevgeny Smirnov	United Russia
~~Aleksandr Yelnikov~~	United Russia
~~Natalya Soboleva~~	United Russia
~~Oleg Sergeyev~~	United Russia
~~Alyona Lubenets~~	United Russia
Ivan Subochev	United Russia
Maria Prusakova	Communist Party
Andrey Krivov	Communist Party
Sergey Nemchinov	Communist Party
Aleksandr Tkachev	Communist Party
Vladimir Balakhnin	Communist Party
Andrey Chernobay	Communist Party
Sergey Krylov	Communist Party
~~Leonid Slutsky~~	Liberal Democratic Party
Dmitry Shor	Liberal Democratic Party
Sergey Bulayev	Liberal Democratic Party
Denis Nachtigall	Liberal Democratic Party
Irina Shudra	Liberal Democratic Party
Maksim Bannykh	New People
Nikita Fedyunin	New People
Anna Galitskaya	New People
Pavel Konovod	New People
Alexander Terentyev	A Just Russia
Yevgenia Borovikova	A Just Russia

== See also ==
- 2026 Russian regional elections
