= Vladimir Bavarin =

Russian politician

Vladimir Nikolaevich Bavarin
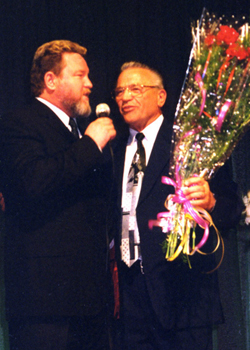
- Bavarin (right) with the head of Altai Krai Mikhail Evdokimov

Head of administration of Barnaul
- In office 11 December 1991 – 22 February 2003

Personal details
- Born: 9 March 1939 village Kuklino, Kalinin Oblast, RSFSR, Soviet Union
- Died: 22 February 2003 (aged 63) Manzherok, Altai Republic, Russia

Vladimir Nikolaevich Bavarin (9 March 1939 — 22 February 2003) was a Russian statesman. He served as the head of administration (mayor) of Barnaul in 1991-2003.

== Career ==
Vladimir Bavarin was born in 1939 in Kuklino, Kalinin Oblast. During the siege of Leningrad, his family was evacuated to Barnaul. In 1962 he graduated from the Altai Polytechnic Institute. He worked at the Altai Motor Plant, and became secretary of the local Communist party committee. In 1983 he became secretary of the Barnaul city committee, and in 1986 he was elected chairman of the Executive Committee of the city council. After the Soviet Union collapsed in 1991, Bavarin began to serve in the new office of mayor. In 1996 he won the first mayoral election in Barnaul.

He died in a car crash on Chuya highway near Manzherok, Altai Republic in 2003, two years before the governor of Altai Krai Mikhail Evdokimov died in another car crash. His death was widely reported as suspicious at the time and gave birth to multiple conspiracy theories.
