= Aleksandr Nazarchuk =

Russian politician (1939–2021)

- Александр Назарчук
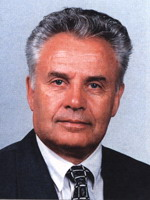

Minister of Agriculture
- In office 27 October 1994 – 12 January 1996
- Preceded by: Viktor Khlystun
- Succeeded by: Alexander Zaveryukha

Chairman of the Altai Krai Legislative Assembly
- In office 31 March 1996 – 3 March 2008
- Preceded by: Aleksandr Surikov
- Succeeded by: Ivan Loor

Personal details
- Born: 6 August 1939 Romanovo, Russian SFSR, Soviet Union
- Died: 1 February 2021 (aged 81) Solnechnoye, Pervomaysky District, Altai Krai, Russia
- Party: CPSU; APR

Aleksandr Grigoryevich Nazarchuk (Russian: Александр Григорьевич Назарчук; 6 August 1939 – 1 February 2021) was a Soviet and Russian politician. He served as Minister of Agriculture and Chairman of the Altai Krai Legislative Assembly.

== Biography ==
Nazarchuk graduated from Altai State Agricultural University and earned a PhD. in biological sciences. In 1964, he began working as an inspector-general for collective farm management before overseeing all farm production in the Romanovsky District. From 1977 to 1985, he served as First Secretary of the Romanovsky District Committee of the Communist Party of the Soviet Union (CPSU), and from 1985 to 1987 he served as First Secretary of the Shipunovsky District Committee of the CPSU.

In 1990, Nazarchuk was elected to the Congress of People's Deputies of Russia, serving until the Congress' disbanding in 1993. That year, he was elected to the State Duma as a member of the Agrarian Party of Russia (APR). He then served as Minister of Agriculture from 27 October 1994 to 12 January 1996 and was Chairman of the Altai Krai Legislative Assembly from 31 March 1996 to 3 March 2008. He was also an honorary member of the Federation Council from 1996 to 2001.

In 2005, Nazarchuk became a political rival of Altai Krai Governor Mikhail Evdokimov. Evdokimov was impeached as Governor in March, although he passed the vote of no confidence, and died in a car accident in August of that year.

Nazarchuk announced his resignation as Chairman of the Altai Krai Legislative Assembly due to differences with deputies. He did not retain his seat on the Assembly in that year's elections, and the chairmanship was thus attained by Ivan Loor.

Aleksandr Nazarchuk died in Solnechnoye on 1 February 2021, at the age of 81.

== Awards ==
- Order "For Merit to the Fatherland", 4th class (10 August 1999)
- Order of the Badge of Honour
- Order of the Red Banner of Labour
- Order "For Merit for the Altai Krai", 2nd class (2009)
- Order of Ivan Kalita (2008)
- Gratitude of the President of the Russian Federation (14 August 1995)
