= Mikhail Shchetinin (politician) =

Russian politician (born 1953)

- Михаил Щетинин
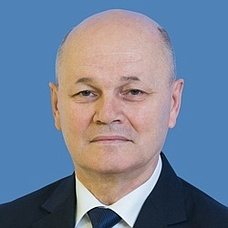

Senator from Altai Krai
- In office 26 September 2014 – 18 September 2018
- Preceded by: Yury Shamkov
- Succeeded by: Alexander Karlin

Personal details
- Born: Mikhail Shchetinin; 6 August 1953 (age 73) Barnaul, Altai Krai, Russian SFSR, Soviet Union
- Education: Altai State Technical University

Mikhail Pavlovich Shchetinin (Russian: Михаил Павлович Щетинин; born 6 August 1953) is a Russian politician who served as a senator from Altai Krai from 2014 to 2018.

== Career ==
Mikhail Shchetinin was born on 6 August 1953 in Barnaul, Altai Krai. In 1976, he graduated from the Altai State Technical University. From 1976 to 1993, he worked at the All-Russian Research Institute of Butter and Cheese Making. From 1993 to 1996, Shchetinin served as Deputy Head of the Zheleznodorozhny City District, Barnaul. From March 2003 to September 2005, he was the head of the district. From September 2014 to September 2018 Shchetinin represented Altai Krai in the Federation Council.
