= Lev Korshunov =

Russian politician

- Лев Коршунов
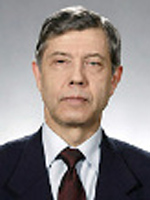

2nd Head of Administration of Altai Krai
- In office 20 January 1994 – 20 December 1996
- Preceded by: Vladimir Rayfikesht
- Succeeded by: Aleksandr Surikov

Personal details
- Born: Lev Aleksandrovich Korshunov; 13 February 1946 (age 80) Irkutsk, RSFSR, Soviet Union
- Party: Our Home - Russia; United Russia (since 2006)

Lev Aleksandrovich Korshunov (Russian: Лев Александрович Коршунов; born 13 February 1946), is a Russian public and political figure, who served as the 2nd Governor of Altai Krai from 1994 to 1996.

He is a Doctor of Economics in 2011.

== Biography ==
Lev Korshunov was born on 13 February 1946. He studied and graduated from three universities: the Altai State Technical University between 1965 and 1970, the Moscow Engineering and Economic Institute between 1973 and 1977, and the Russian Academy of Public Administration under the President of Russia between 1998 and 2000. In the first, he studied internally, in the other two - in absentia. As a result, he received the qualifications of a civil engineer and an engineer-economist, as well as a lawyer.

He began to work in 1970 in Barnaul as a line foreman, then as a foreman, surveyor engineer, deputy head of the production and technical department of the SU-12 trust "Altaypromstroy". In 1977, he was the Chief Engineer, and later, the Head of SU 38 of the Altaykoksokhimstroy Trust in Zarinsk. From 1984 to 1987, he worked as the manager of the Trust No. 46 "Glavaltaystroy" in Rubtsovsk. From 1987 to 1991, he was the Chairman of the Rubtsovsk City Executive Committee, and the Chairman of the City Council of People's Deputies.

In November 1991, he was the deputy head of the regional administration, then the first deputy head of the regional administration.

On 20 January 1994, as Vladimir Rayfikesht resigned, on his recommendation, Boris Yeltsin appointed Korshunov as the new governor of Altai Krai. During his governorship, many months of delays in the payment of pensions and salaries to public sector employees began. The region's economy turned out to be unadapted to the new conditions.

Altai Krai continued to be a subsidized region. But thanks to good relations with Prime Minister Viktor Chernomyrdin, Korshunov achieved the adoption of a government decree "On measures of state support in overcoming depressive phenomena in the economy of the Altai Krai." The document instructed the Ministry of Finance "before the adoption of the federal law on state minimum social standards, to annually determine the amount of financial support for the Altai Krai from the federal budget, taking into account the specifics and features of the crisis state of its economy." In addition, the governor has achieved the start of gasification of the region.

In December 1996, Korshurov lost the first gubernatorial elections in the Altai Krai to Aleksandr Surikov.

=== Public service ===
In February 1997, he worked as the head of the state tax inspectorate for the Altai Krai, the head of the department of the Ministry of Taxes of the Russia in the Altai Krai. In this position, he was promoted to the rank of III rank state adviser to the tax service of Russia.

In 1998, he was the Head of the Department "State Tax Service" of the Altai State Technical University, Ph.D., Associate Professor. He is also a member of the regional interdepartmental coordination council of federal structures.

In 2001 he defended his thesis on the topic "Tax resources of the region in the transition to a market economy (the example of the Altai Krai)", received the degree of candidate of economic sciences. He has a monograph, 2 textbooks and more than 20 scientific articles.

In 2003, Korshurov was elected to the State Duma in the Slavgorod single-mandate district in Altai Krai.

In 2006, he prepared for defense his thesis "Sustainable and safe development of the regional economy in the context of spatial transformations (on the example of the Altai Krai)" for the degree of Doctor of Economics, in which, according to the investigation of the network expert community Dissernet, large-scale borrowings were discovered, but for unknown reasons protection did not take place.

In March 2007, he nominated himself for the election of the rector of the Altai State Technical University, and on 7 August 2007, on the recommendation of the head of the Federal Education Agency G. A Balykhin, he was appointed acting vice-rector for capital construction at Altai State Technical University, in order to subsequently have the legal right to appoint him as acting rector.

On 18 September 2007, by order of the Federal Agency for Education, he was appointed Acting Rector of Altai State Technical University. On 9 November 2007, he won the election of the university rector by a margin of 1 vote. He remained in this post until 13 February 2012.

On 16 February 2011 he defended his doctoral dissertation "Increasing the economic security of the region in the process of spatial transformations" (scientific consultants Aleksandr Kuklin and Aleksandr Tatarkin with his official opponents: Andrei Kozitsyn, Olga Romanova and Dmitry Sorokin), where large-scale borrowings were also found.

Since 14 February 2012, he was the President of the university.

On 20 June 2012 he was elected Chairman of the Council of the Public Chamber of the Altai Krai.

Since 2017, he is an Advisor to the Rector.
