= Mikhail Shchetinin =

Mikhail Shchetinin may refer to:

- Mikhail Shchetinin (politician) (born 1953), Russian politician
- Mikhail Shchetinin (footballer) (born 2005), Russian footballer
