= Mikhail Kozlov =

Mikhail Kozlov may refer to:

- Mikhail Kozlov (footballer)
- Mikhail Kozlov (politician)
