= Victor Zobnev =

Russian politician (born 1964)

- Виктор Зобнев
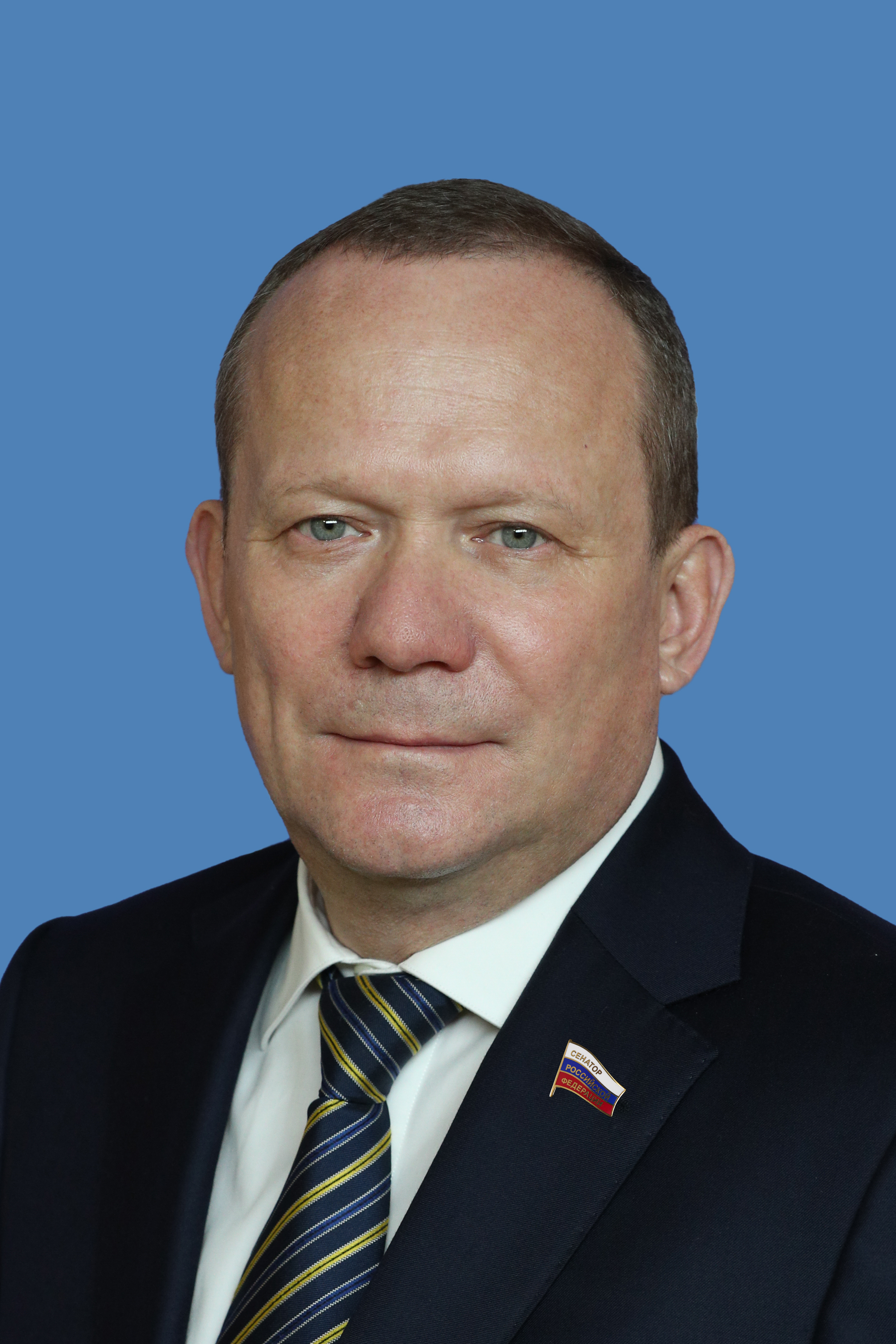
- Official portrait, 2021

Senator from the Altai Republic
- Incumbent
- Assumed office 7 October 2021
- Preceded by: Sergey Belousov

Personal details
- Born: Victor Zobnev; 7 June 1964 (age 62) Rubtsovsk, Altai Krai, Russian Soviet Federative Socialist Republic, Soviet Union
- Party: United Russia
- Education: Altai State Technical University

Victor Viktorovich Zobnev (Russian: Виктор Викторович Зобнев; born 7 June 1964) is a Russian politician serving as a senator from the Altai Republic since 7 October 2021.

== Biography ==
Victor Zobnev was born on 7 June 1964 in Rubtsovsk, Altai Krai. In 1989, he graduated from the Altai State Technical University. From 1982 to 1984, Zobnev served in the Soviet Army. Afterwards, he engaged in private business and even became one of the founders of CJSC "Rubtsovsky Spare Parts Plant". On 2 March 2008, he was elected deputy of the Altai Krai Legislative Assembly of the 5th convocation. On 4 December 2011, he was re-elected. From 2016 to 2021, he was the deputy of the 7th State Duma from the United Russia party. On 7 October 2021, he became the senator from the State Assembly of the Altai Republic.

Victor Zobnev is under personal sanctions introduced by the European Union, the United Kingdom, the USA, Canada, Switzerland, Australia, Ukraine, New Zealand, for ratifying the decisions of the "Treaty of Friendship, Cooperation and Mutual Assistance between the Russian Federation and the Donetsk People's Republic and between the Russian Federation and the Luhansk People's Republic" and providing political and economic support for Russia's annexation of Ukrainian territories.
