= Yury Shamkov =

Russian politician (born 1966)

- Юрий Шамков

Senator from Altai Krai
- In office 20 February 2008 – 26 September 2014
- Preceded by: Igor Albin
- Succeeded by: Yury Shamkov

Personal details
- Born: Yury Shamkov; 25 June 1966 (age 60) Barnaul, Altai Krai, Russian SFSR, Soviet Union
- Education: Altai State Technical University

Yury Veniaminovich Shamkov (Russian: Юрий Вениаминович Шамков; born 25 June 1966) is a Russian politician who served as a senator from Altai Krai from 2008 to 2014.

== Career ==
Yury Shamkov was born on 25 June 1966 in Barnaul, Altai Krai. In 1988, he graduated from the Altai State Technical University. From 1988 to 1993, he served as an ingenieur at the Sibenergomash. Afterward, he was engaged in the sphere of private business for 5 years. In 2000, Shamkov was elected deputy of the Altai Krai Legislative Assembly. From February 2008 to September 2014 Shamkov represented Altai Krai in the Federation Council.

He is under sanctions introduced by Ukraine for approving the annexation of Crimea.
