= Pleshkovo =

Pleshkovo Плешково
- Selo
- Location within Altai Krai Location within Russia
- Coordinates: 52°44′N 84°47′E
- Country: Russia
- Region: Altai Krai
- District: Zonalny District
- Time zone: UTC+7:00

Pleshkovo (Russian: Плешково) is a rural locality (a selo) and the administrative center of Pleshkovsky Selsoviet, Zonalny District, Altai Krai, Russia. The population was 1,280 as of 2013. There are 14 streets.

== Geography ==
Pleshkovo is located 23 km northwest of Zonalnoye (the district's administrative centre) by road. Bulanikha is the nearest rural locality.
