= 1951 in fine arts of the Soviet Union =

The year 1951 was marked by many events that left an imprint on the history of Soviet and Russian Fine Arts.

== Events ==
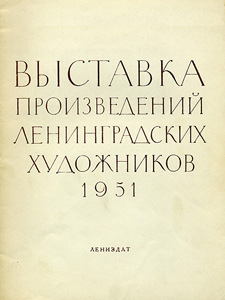
Exhibition Catalog

- Annual Exhibition of works by Leningrad artists of 1951 was opened in the halls of the Leningrad Union of Artists. The participants were Piotr Alberti, Vladislav Anisovich, Vladimir Avlas, Nikolai Babasuk, Vsevolod Bazhenov, Piotr Belousov, Olga Bogaevskaya, Piotr Buchkin, Rudolf Frentz, Nikolai Galakhov, Vladimir Gorb, Tatiana Kopnina, Nikolai Kostrov, Anna Kostrova, Alexander Lubimov, Evsey Moiseenko, Mikhail Natarevich, Yuri Neprintsev, Vladimir Ovchinnikov, Sergei Osipov, Alexander Pushnin, Ivan Savenko, Gleb Savinov, Alexander Samokhvalov, Vladimir Seleznev, Alexander Shmidt, Nadezhda Shteinmiller, Nikolai Timkov, Leonid Tkachenko, Mikhail Tkachev, Yuri Tulin, Igor Veselkin, Nina Veselova, Rostislav Vovkushevsky, Vecheslav Zagonek, and other important Leningrad artists.
- May 9 — a monument to the Hero of the Great Patriotic War a soldier Alexander Matrosov (1924–1943) was unveiled in Ufa. Authors of the monument sculptor L. Adlyn and A. Gribov.
- November 22 — Fine Art Exhibition of works by Leningrad artists of 1951 opened in the State Russian museum. The participants were David Alkhovsky, Nikolai Babasuk, Vsevolod Bazhenov, Olga Bogaevskaya, Lev Bogomolets, Vitaly Valtsev, Vasily Vikulov, Igor Veselkin, Nina Veselova, Rostislav Vovkushevsky, Vecheslav Zagonek, Lev Volshtein, Yakov Golubev, Vladimir Gorb, Sergei Zakharov, Ruben Zakharian, Nina Ivanova, Piotr Ivanovsky, Anatoli Kazantsev, Georgy Kalinkin, Nikolai Kostrov, Anna Kostrova, Felix Lembersky, Israil Lizak, Vladimir Malagis, Yevsey Moiseenko, Andrei Mylnikov, Mikhail Natarevich, Yuri Neprintsev, Yaroslav Nikolaev, Sergei Osipov, Genrikh Pavlovsky, Pen Varlen, Yuri Podlasky, Gleb Savinov, Alexander Samokhvalov, Joseph Serebriany, Nikolai Timkov, Yuri Tulin, Rudolf Frentz, and other important Leningrad artists.
- Stalin Prize winner of 1951 in the area of Fine Arts were painter Boris Ioganson, Vasily Sokolov (for painting «Appearance of Lenin on III convention of Komsomol», Tretyakov gallery), sculptor Sergei Merkurov (for monument to Joseph Stalin in Yerevan), Kukryniksy, painter Dmitriy Nalbandyan (for painting «The Great Friendship»), sculptor Vera Mukhina (for sculpture «We demand Peace»).

== Deaths ==
- November 8 — Veniamin Belkin, (Russian: Белкин Вениамин Павлович), Russian soviet painter and graphic artist (born 1884).

== See also ==
- List of Russian artists
- List of painters of Leningrad Union of Artists
- Saint Petersburg Union of Artists
- Russian culture
- 1951 in the Soviet Union

== Sources ==
- Выставка произведений ленинградских художников 1951 года. Каталог. Л., Лениздат, 1951.
- Всесоюзная художественная выставка 1951 года. Живопись, скульптура, графика, цветная фотография. Каталог. Изд. Второе. М., Государственная Третьяковская галерея, 1952.
- Выставка произведений ленинградских художников. Каталог. Л., Государственный Русский музей, 1952.
- Artists of Peoples of the USSR. Biography Dictionary. Vol. 1. Moscow, Iskusstvo, 1970.
- Artists of Peoples of the USSR. Biography Dictionary. Vol. 2. Moscow, Iskusstvo, 1972.
- Выставки советского изобразительного искусства. Справочник. Т.4. 1948—1953 годы. М., Советский художник, 1976.
- Directory of Members of Union of Artists of USSR. Volume 1,2. Moscow, Soviet Artist Edition, 1979.
- Directory of Members of the Leningrad branch of the Union of Artists of Russian Federation. Leningrad, Khudozhnik RSFSR, 1980.
- Artists of Peoples of the USSR. Biography Dictionary. Vol. 4 Book 1. Moscow, Iskusstvo, 1983.
- Directory of Members of the Leningrad branch of the Union of Artists of Russian Federation. - Leningrad: Khudozhnik RSFSR, 1987.
- Artists of peoples of the USSR. Biography Dictionary. Vol. 4 Book 2. - Saint Petersburg: Academic project humanitarian agency, 1995.
- Link of Times: 1932 - 1997. Artists - Members of Saint Petersburg Union of Artists of Russia. Exhibition catalogue. - Saint Petersburg: Manezh Central Exhibition Hall, 1997.
- Matthew C. Bown. Dictionary of 20th Century Russian and Soviet Painters 1900-1980s. London, Izomar, 1998.
- Vern G. Swanson. Soviet Impressionism. Woodbridge, England, Antique Collectors' Club, 2001.
- Время перемен. Искусство 1960—1985 в Советском Союзе. СПб., Государственный Русский музей, 2006.
- Sergei V. Ivanov. Unknown Socialist Realism. The Leningrad School. Saint-Petersburg, NP-Print Edition, 2007. ISBN 5-901724-21-6, ISBN 978-5-901724-21-7.
- Anniversary Directory graduates of Saint Petersburg State Academic Institute of Painting, Sculpture, and Architecture named after Ilya Repin, Russian Academy of Arts. 1915 - 2005. Saint Petersburg: Pervotsvet Publishing House, 2007.
