= Sibirsky, Pervomaysky District, Altai Krai =

Sibirsky Сибирский
- Settlement
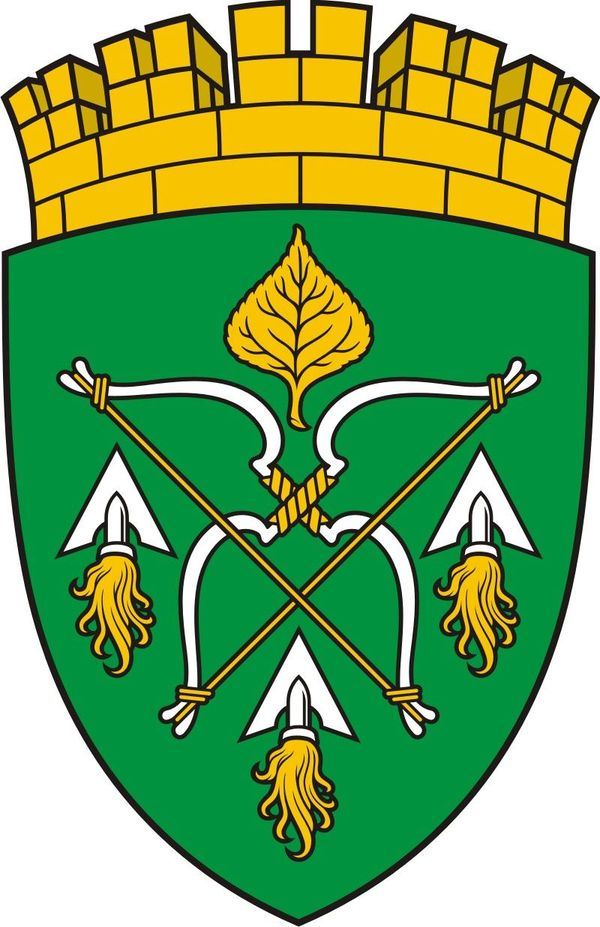
- Seal

- Location within Altai Krai Location within Russia
- Coordinates: 53°34′N 83°46′E
- Country: Russia
- Region: Altai Krai
- District: Pervomaysky District
- Time zone: UTC+7:00

Sibirsky (Russian: Сибирский) is a rural locality (a settlement) and the administrative center of Sibirsky Selsoviet, Pervomaysky District, Altai Krai, Russia. The population was 1,679 as of 2013. There are 29 streets.

== Geography ==
Sibirsky is located 27 km northwest of Novoaltaysk (the district's administrative centre) by road. Tsaplino is the nearest rural locality.
