= Mikhail Evdokimov =

Russian comedian, actor and politician

- Михаил Евдокимов
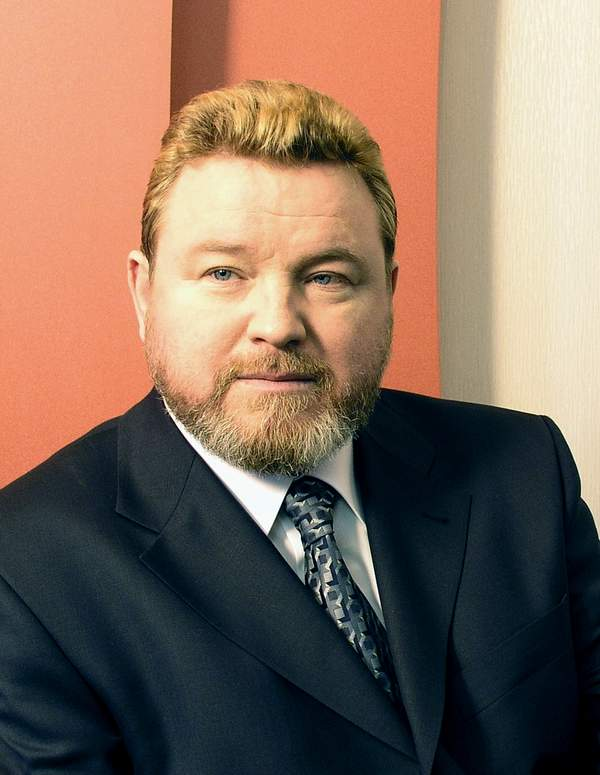
- Yevdokimov in 2004

4th Governor (Head) of Altai Krai
- In office 14 April 2004 – 7 August 2005
- Preceded by: Aleksandr Surikov
- Succeeded by: Mikhail Kozlov (acting); Alexander Karlin

Personal details
- Born: 6 December 1957 Stalinsk, Russian SFSR, Soviet Union
- Died: 7 August 2005 (aged 47) Pleshkovo, Russia
- Spouse: Galina Nikolayevna Yevdokimova
- Children: Anna; Annastasia; Daniil

Mikhail Sergeyevich Yevdokimov (Russian: Михаил Сергеевич Евдокимов; 6 December 1957 – 7 August 2005) was a Russian comedian, actor and politician.

== Biography ==
Yevdokimov was born in Stalinsk (now Novokuznetsk), western Siberia. After a long career as a comedian, actor and singer, he had entered politics by 2003. In April 2004, he became governor of the Altai Krai region of Russia after defeating incumbent Aleksandr Surikov in the elections. Surikov was the candidate supported by Russian president Vladimir Putin and Yevdokimov became one of the few Russian governors not to have Putin's support. Later, in part because of this election, Putin supported a law which was successfully passed that governors would no longer be directly elected.

In March 2005, Yevdokimov was impeached by the local legislature in a no confidence vote which passed by a vote of 46 to 5. He remained in office, but was under increasing pressure to resign. On 7 August 2005, Yevdokimov was killed in a car accident while travelling on the Russian route M52 20 km from the city of Biysk. His car grazed another car then ran off the road and hit a tree. Yevdokimov's driver and bodyguard died along with him, while his wife, who was also in the car, survived. The driver of the car that collided with Yevdokimov's car, Oleg Scherbinsky, was convicted of breaking traffic laws with fatal result and sentenced to spend 4 years in a settlement colony. Scherbinsky's conviction was followed by car drivers' protests and demonstrations all over Russia; the Russian government officials, even of the lowliest rank, have a habit of not following the traffic rules, casually driving over the speed limit, in the wrong lane or using the blinking lights on top of their car, creating a lot of problems on the road and endangering regular drivers. The traffic police usually are lenient in enforcing the rules against them, and regular drivers are often blamed in case of a collision with a government car. On 23 March 2006, Scherbinsky's conviction was overturned on appeal and he was released.

Yevdokimov was married (Galina) and had one daughter (Anna). He also had another daughter, Anastasia, with a woman named Nadezhda Zharkova. After Yevdokimov's death, Zharkova twice sued Galina and Anna for inheritance, but never arrived to the courthouse, and both cases were dismissed due to Zharkova's absence in court.

== Head of Administration of the Altai Krai ==
=== Crisis of power ===
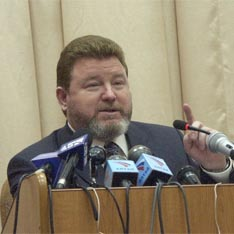
Evdokimov at the first press conference after winning the elections, 6 April 2004

Most deputies elected to the Altai Krai Legislative Assembly were supporters of Aleksandr Surikov. Evdokimov, as the new head, failed to establish relations with the Krai Assembly. Most deputies argued that over a year of work, Evdokimov demonstrated an inability to form an effective management team and blamed him for the failure of economic policy. The reason for this was considered to be the "personnel" leapfrog in the governor's entourage (17 deputies were replaced during the year).

At the same time, Evdokimov's supporters (for example, the Awakening movement, which had about 30 active members and was led by Alexei Nikulin) organized rallies and collected signatures in his support. In March–April 2005, the Awakening movement organized several rallies and pickets against the actions of the Krai Assembly to remove Evdokimov.

On 23 December 2004, Altai Krai Legislative Assembly deputies accepted an appeal (interpellation) to Evdokimov, as Head of the Administration of the Altai Krai, with a request to comment on the personnel policy pursued by his administration.

At the end of February 2005, at a session of the Krai Assembly, a resolution was adopted on Evdokimov's improper performance of his duties as head of the Altai Krai. The resolution was sent to the embassy of the Siberian Federal District and the president of the Russian Federation. In March, the heads of 49 districts of the Krai and several cities of regional subordination sent a letter to the plenipotentiary representative in the Siberian Federal District, Anatoly Kvashnin, and Russian president Vladimir Putin, in which they demanded Evdokimov's resignation as governor. Finally, Evdokimov's resignation was demanded by representatives of various regional political parties and public organizations - from United Russia to the Communist Party of the Russian Federation. At the same time, Evdokimov's supporters collected more than 52,000 signatures from ordinary citizens in his defense in just nine days. They sent the collected signatures to the Administration of the President of the Russian Federation.

On 31 March 2005, at a session of the Krai Assembly, deputies expressed no confidence in Evdokimov. 46 out of 52 deputies voted for this. According to federal law, the governor's fate was to be decided by the President of the Russian Federation. Thus, a nationwide precedent could be created: for the first time, the removal of a governor from office could occur not only on the head of state's initiative, but also at the insistence of the region's Legislative Assembly. However, President Vladimir Putin did not intervene in this situation. At the same meeting, Evdokimov refused to read the traditional report on the region's socio-economic situation to the Krai Assembly's deputies. He explained his step by saying that the deputies were still unconstructive and could not perceive the report adequately.

On 11 May 2005, Evdokimov invited all his deputies and heads of committees and departments of the administration to resign. This was his response to the actions of the Krai Assembly, which twice recognized the administration's work as unsatisfactory. Most of his team members wrote letters of resignation.

== Filmography ==
- Where is the Nophelet? (1988) — dubbing, Gena's singing
- Remembering the Cow March (1991) — talker, singer
- About businessman Foma (1993) — Foma
- I do not want to get married! (1993) — police officer
- Full House and Co (1996) — cameo
- Don't Play the Fool... (1997) — Filimon
- Why Don't We Send... a Messenger? (1998) — Ivan
- Old Hags (2000) — Timofey Astrakhantsev, businessman from Astrakhan
