= Flag of Altai Krai =

Flag of the Russian krai of Altai

Altai Krai
- Proportion: 2:3
- Adopted: 29 June 2000
- Design: A vertical bicolor of light-blue and red with the coat of arms of the krai
- Designed by: Unknown

The flag of Altai Krai, in the Russian Federation, is a vertical bicolor of light-blue and red charged with a spike of wheat on the blue band and the arms of the krai on the red band. The design follows the pattern of the flags of the Russian SFSR. This center design on the flag is the coat of arms of Altai Krai. The coat of arms was adopted on 25 May 2000. The flag was adopted on 29 June 2000 during a session of the Altai Krai Council of People's Deputies.

== Other flags ==
Flags	Date	Use	Description
	2021–present	Flag of Barnaul	Banner of arms.
	2016–2021	Flag of Barnaul	Blue background with the emblem on the middle.
	2010–present	Flag of Sibirsky	
	?–present	Flag of Belokurikha	
	?–present	Flag of Biysk	White background with the emblem on the middle.
	?–present	Flag of Rubtsovsk	Light blue background with the emblem on the middle.
	2018–present	Flag of Slavgorod	
	?–2018	Flag of Slavgorod	
	2012–present	Flag of Yarovoye	
	2024–present	Flag of Aleysky District	
	2025–present	Flag of Altaysky District	
	2025–present	Flag of Bayevsky District	
	?–present	Flag of Biysky District	
	2016–present	Flag of Yeltsovsky District	
	2005–2016	Flag of Yeltsovsky District	
	2024–present	Flag of Zalesovsky District	
	2012–present	Flag of Zmeinogorsky District	
	?–present	Flag of Krasnogorsky District	
	2006–present	Flag of Pervomaysky District	
	?–2006	Flag of Pervomaysky District	
	?–present	Flag of Rubtsovsky District	Light blue background with the emblem on the middle.
	2007–present	Flag of Sovetsky District	
	2023–present	Flag of Soloneshensky District	
	?–present	Flag of Shelabolikhinsky District	
	2019–present	Flag of Talmensky District	
	2007–present	Flag of Tyumentsevsky District	
	2014–present	Flag of Shipunovsky District	
	2016–present	Flag of Nemetsky National District	
