= Vladimir Rayfikesht =

Russian politician

- Владимир Райфикешт

1st Head of Administration of Altai Krai
- In office 8 October 1991 – 20 January 1994
- Succeeded by: Lev Korshunov

Personal details
- Born: Vladimir Fyodorovich Rayfikesht; 15 April 1951 (age 74) Povalikha, Pervomaysky District, Altai Krai, RSFSR, Soviet Union
- Party: Union of Right Forces (until 2003); United Russia (since 2004)

Vladimir Fyodorovich Rayfikesht (Russian: Владимир Фёдорович Райфикешт; born 15 April 1951) is a Russian politician, who served as the 1st Head of Administration of the Altai Krai from 1991 to 1994.

== Biography ==
Vladimir Rayfikesht was born in the village of Povalikha, in the Pervomaisky District, on 15 April 1951.

In 1973, he graduated from the Altai Agricultural Institute with a degree in agronomist.

From 1973 to 1975, he served in the Soviet Army, then worked in the agriculture of the region.

From 1981 to 1991, he was the Director of the Logovskaya state farm in the Pervomaisky District of the Altai Krai.

From 1990 to 1993, he was the People's Deputy of the RSFSR.

=== Governor of Altai Krai ===
In 1992, President Boris Yeltsin paid a visit to the Altai Krai when Rayfikesht was governor. During his visit, the Raifikesht team was able to resolve several strategic issues of paramount importance for the further development of the Altai Krai: such as the construction of the main gas pipeline between Novosibirsk and Barnaul, the construction of a new road bridge across the Ob, and financing of the Semipalatinsk program.

It is especially difficult for any revolutionaries and reformers to work in our outback. Vladimir Raifikesht was viewed by many as a romantic revolutionary perestroika who replaced the bankrupt partocrats. In this role, there were both advantages and disadvantages. They spoke not only about his sincere belief in democracy and personal decency, but also about his lack of managerial skills. He had to assemble a team of very different people, some of whom later betrayed him, and some too actively engaged in improving their well-being. On the other hand, he faced an ever-growing hatred of his “exes” who dreamed of revenge. As a result, Raifikesht did not manage to complete the work that had to be done then in the Altai Territory: it was necessary to thoughtfully, but quickly transfer the economy to market rails, create an effective team of modern managers.

— Yuri Chernyshov, head of the department of general history and international relations at Altai State University, assesses his activities as head of the regional administration

The program has attracted billions of rubles in social payments and investments to the Altai Krai. Thanks to the Semipalatinsk program, new social and healthcare facilities were built precisely at the expense of the Semipalatinsk program.

During Rayfikesht's governorship, there was an upsurge in small business and entrepreneurship, the foundation and foundation for the development of the private sector was laid. The judicial system was rebuilt, new buildings were erected for courts. Raifikest contributed to the creation of the Museum of Culture and Ethnography, a unique cultural and literary museum. Plus, Raifikesht made a great contribution to the agrarian policy of the region, a large number of farms were created, some of them still work. Successful collective farms were transformed into joint stock companies.

=== Political management ===
From 1994 to 1997, Rayfikesht was the director of Logovskoye CJSC in Pervomaisky District of Altai Krai. From 1997 to 1999, he was Plenipotentiary Representative of the President of Russia in the Altai TerritoryKrai. From 1999 to 2003, he was the chairman of the regional public organization of the Altai Regional Public Committee for the Protection of Human Rights and Freedoms. He was the chairman of the Altai regional organization of the Union of Right Forces until 2003.

From April 2003, he worked in the branch of JSC FGC UES - "Intersystem electrical networks of Siberia": a deputy general director for the creation of MMSK, deputy general director for reforming, deputy general director for Development of MMSK, deputy general director for maintenance, and General Director of Maintenance and Repair of the branch of JSC "FGC UES" - "Intersystem electrical networks of Siberia". Since 1 August 2006 - he was interim general director. He then became General Director of IDGC of Siberia, JSC, until December 2007. Since January 2008, he is an advisor to the Head of the Federal Grid Company.

Yes, we were infringed upon, we were hated, our administration was not allowed to work in full measure. As a result, I was forced to resign. But I will say the main thing: our administration succeeded to start serious economic reforms in the region; This, I believe, is our main success.

— Rayfishket's opinion about himself as governor in an interview in 2006.
