= Natalya Kuvshinova =

Russian politician (born 1986)

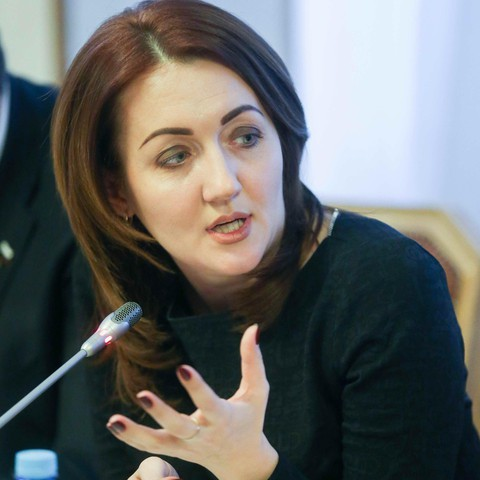
- Kuvshinova in 2016

Member of the Federation Council
- Incumbent
- Assumed office 19 September 2023
- Preceded by: Alexander Karlin
- Constituency: Altai Krai

Member of the State Duma
- In office 5 October 2016 – 11 October 2021

Personal details
- Born: 3 June 1986 (age 40)
- Party: United Russia

Natalya Sergeevna Kuvshinova (Russian: Наталья Сергеевна Кувшинова; born 3 June 1986) is a Russian politician serving as a member of the Federation Council since 2023. From 2016 to 2021, she was a member of the State Duma.
