= Solnechnoye, Altai Krai =

Solnechnoye Солнечное
- Selo
- Location within Altai Krai Location within Russia
- Coordinates: 53°23′N 83°59′E
- Country: Russia
- Region: Altai Krai
- District: Pervomaysky District
- Time zone: UTC+7:00

Solnechnoye (Russian: Солнечное) is a rural locality (a selo) and the administrative center of Solnechny Selsoviet, Pervomaysky District, Altai Krai, Russia. The population was 477 as of 2013. There are 30 streets.

== Geography ==
Solnechnoye is located 8 km east of Novoaltaysk (the district's administrative centre) by road. Novy is the nearest rural locality.
