= Rouslan Saghabalyan =

Rouslan Saghabalyan (arm. Ռուսլան Փարնավազի Սաղաբալյան, rus. Руслан Парнавазович Сагабалян; born January 20, 1951) is a Russian writer, journalist and screenwriter of Armenian origin. He has also written under the pen name Sagarus (rus. САГАРУС).

== Life and career ==
Rouslan Saghabalyan is a Russian writer, journalist, screenwriter of Armenian origin. Was born on January 15, 1951, in Grozni, Russia. He moved to Armenia at the age of 5 with his parents. After finishing the Russian Language school 58, studied at Yerevan State University Faculty of Russian Philology. From 1975 to 1982 has worked at Literary Armenia magazine. In 1982 was admitted to prestigious Higher Courses of Cinematography in Moscow, studied at the Faculty of Screenwriting at famous Russian screenwriter Valeri Frid's class from 1982-1984. After graduating from the courses with a diploma of excellence, returned to Yerevan, where he continued his work of a journalist and a writer.

From 1990 to 1992, he was the Chief Editor of the Russian Language newspaper Aragast. In 1992 moved to Moscow. During his first years in Moscow he founded the magazine Comme il faut and the newspaper Osobnyak 16. Later was the Chief Editor of the newspaper Roman-Tabloid and the Deputy editor of Stolichni Sever magazine.

At early 2000 started teaching Journalism at Moscow University of Humanities (later renamed to Natalia Nesterova Academy). For years was also a regular contributor to Vechernyaya Moskva (Evening Moscow) newspaper. His articles were also published in Moscovskaya Pravda newspaper, Rovestnik, Esli, TV and Cinema World magazines. He was a regular essayist in Noev Kovcheg newspaper.

His short stories were regularly published in Stupeni Orakula and Yesli weekly. They were also published by the Russian Edition of Playboy.

Saghabalyan's first book of science-fiction short stories Behind the Horizon (Հորիզոնից այն կողմ) was published in Armenian in 1983. The second book of science-fiction short stories The Cutest Dinosaur Ever was published in Russian, in 1990.

In 1996 in his novel Cosmic Decameron was published in Moscow, under pen name "Sagarus". The book is considered to be one of the first novels representing a new genre- Erotic Science-Fiction. Rouslan Saghabalyan's next book Hamlet's Father's Ghost was published in 2004. in 2011 his book of essays of the recent years Looking for Edem was published.

Rouslan Saghabalyan is the author of screenplays of more than a dozen cartoons, short movies as well as documentaries.

One of his most famous works "And Every Evening" cartoon was awarded a Grand-Prix at the Film Festival in Kiev, in 1987. Another famous cartoon is the "Invention".

In 2009 Rouslan Saghabalyan was awarded with the prestigious "Golden Verb" award of the Media Union in Moscow. His works in different periodic publications were awarded as the best contribution of the year in various times.

Rouslan Saghabalyan is represented at different encyclopedias of Science-Fiction, including Who is Who in Science-Fiction (Editor Vl. Gakov), and Science-Fiction from A to Z (Editor Al. Osipov).

Member of the Union of Journalists and the Union of Writers of both Armenia and Russia.

Was married twice, has a daughter and a son of the second marriage.

== List of works ==
Books

"Behind the Horizon"-1993

"My Time Machine" (unpublished)

"The Cutest Dinosaur Ever"-1990

"Cosmic Decameron"-1996

"Hamlet's Father's Ghost"-2004

"Looking for Eden"-2011

"The Troy Horse-keeper" (the book is still considered for publication)

Notable Short-Stories

"The Tram Ran Through the Apartment"

"Rainbow before the Rain"

"Auction"

"Noah"

"Masha and the Bear"

"The Magician"

"Panel Number 5"

"The Muse"

"Seraphim"

"The Nimbus"

"The Death's Younger Daughter"

"Quarantine"

"The New Kid"

"A Man With a Briefcase"

== Scripts and Adaptations ==
Cartoons

"Hunting the Rabbit"-1984

"And Every Evening"-1986

"The Invention"- 1989

"Phantomagic"- 1996

Documentaries

"Valentin Podpomogov"-1987

"The Far Pier"-1989

== Journalism ==
1975-1982- Editor of the Essays and Opinion Department of "literary Armenia" Magazine. 1990-1992- Chief Editor of the Russian Language "Aragast" Newspaper. 1993-1997- Chief Editor of the "Comme il Faut" Magazine in Moscow. 1997-1999- Deputy Chief Editor of "Stolichni Sever" Magazine in Moscow. 1999-2001- Chief Editor of "Roman-Tabloid" Monthly.

From 1976 to 2012 more than 1.500 works were published in more than a hundred media and literary units, such as:

"Evening Moscow" "Moscow News" "Home Reading" "Dangerous Age" "Megapolis- Express" "Evening Club" "Obshaya Gazeta" "Steps of the Oracle" "Noah's Arch" "Technical Youth" "Rovestnik" "Playboy" "100% Health" "Esli" (If) "Obivatelj" "Domashi Ochag" "Seljskaya Molodezh" "Mir Zvezd" "Mir TV i Kino"
