= Aleksandr Surikov =

Russian statesman (born 1940)

- Александр Суриков
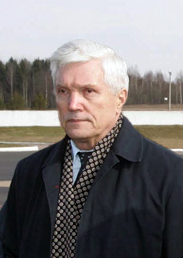
- Surikov in 2007

Ambassador of Russia to Belarus
- In office 6 February 2006 – 24 August 2018
- Preceded by: Dmitry Ayatskov
- Succeeded by: Mikhail Babich

3rd Head of Administration of Altai Krai
- In office 11 December 1996 – 14 April 2004
- Preceded by: Lev Korshunov
- Succeeded by: Mikhail Yevdokimov

Chairman of Altai Krai Legislative Assembly
- In office 1994–1996
- Preceded by: Office established
- Succeeded by: Aleksandr Nazarchuk

Personal details
- Born: 15 August 1940 (age 85) Murmansk, RSFSR, Soviet Union
- Party: United Russia (since 2004)

Aleksandr Aleksandrovich Surikov (Russian: Александр Александрович Суриков; born 15 August 1940), is a Russian statesman, who served as the ambassador to Belarus from 2006 to 2018. He also served as the third governor of Altai Krai from 1996 to 2004.

== Biography ==
He began his career in 1957 at the construction of the Kuibyshev hydroelectric power station. In 1966, he graduated from the Saratov Polytechnic Institute with a degree in civil engineering. In the same year he moved to Altai.

He worked in the Zavyalovsky road construction department. In 1969, he was appointed head of the road construction department No. 3 of the city of Aleysk, Altai Krai, and in 1976, he was the head of the Altaiavtodor association. In 1990, he was elected Director-General of the construction and industrial concern "Altaystroy".

He is fluent in German.

=== Political career ===
In August 1991, he was the Chairman of the Altai Regional Council of People's Deputies. In 1994, he was elected a deputy, and then, and promoted to the chairman of the regional Legislative Assembly. In 1996, he was re-elected to this position.

=== Governor of Altai Krai ===
On 1 December 1996, Surikov was the third Governor (Head) of Altai Krai, and in March 2000, he was re-elected to this position.

During his term as governor, many months of salary delays began, the region dropped to 78th place in the economic rating of regions, hundreds of factories stopped their work, and the regional administration did not have enough money. The region's economy turned out to be unsuitable to the new conditions. But at the same time, a new bridge was built across the Ob River, a regional clinical hospital was opened, and many schools and kindergartens in the region were commissioned.

From 17 September 2001 to 13 March 2002, he was a member of the Presidium of the State Council of Russia.

After Surikov lost the election to Mikhail Yevdokimov in 2004, he worked as an assistant to the plenipotentiary in the Siberian Federal District, while supervising the Altai Krai.

=== Ambassador to Belarus ===
On 6 February 2006, Surikov was appointed the ambassador to Belarus.

On 27 August 2007, Surikov said that in response to US plans to deploy elements of a missile defense system in Eastern Europe, "Russia and Belarus may decide to create new joint military facilities, including nuclear ones." He later said that Russia had no plans to deploy nuclear weapons in Belarus, and his words were “misinterpreted”. The ambassador's statement nevertheless provoked an immediate harsh reaction in the West.

On 7 February 2009, the Ministry of Foreign Affairs of Belarus criticized Surikov's statements at a press conference on 6 February.

Surikov is the only ambassador of Russia to Belarus to have held the post for more than five years.
