= Governor of Altai Krai =

Highest-ranking official in Altai Krai, Russia

- Coat of arms of Altai Krai

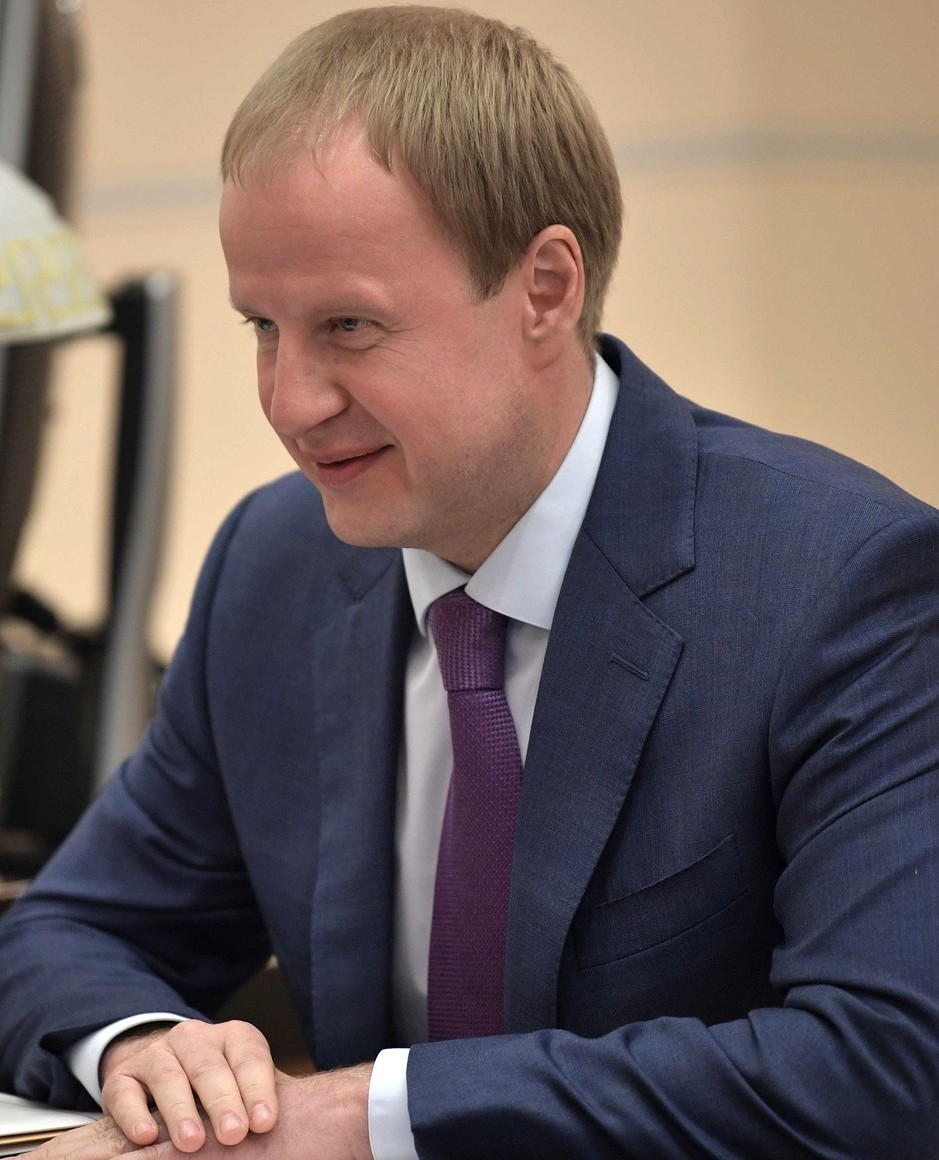
- Incumbent; Viktor Tomenko since 17 September 2018
- Seat: Barnaul
- Term length: 5 years
- Inaugural holder: Vladimir Rayfikesht
- Formation: 1991
- Website: www.altairegion22.ru

The governor of Altai Krai (Russian: Губернатор Алтайского края) is the chief executive of Altai Krai, a federal subject of Russia.

== History of office ==
Before 2007 amendment to the Charter of Altai Krai the office was styled as the Head of Altai Krai Administration.

== List of officeholders ==
No.	Portrait	Name (lifespan)	Tenure	Time in office	Party	Election
1		Vladimir Rayfikesht (born 1951)	8 October 1991 – 20 January 1994 (resigned)	2 years, 104 days	Independent	Appointed
2		Lev Korshunov (born 1946)	20 January 1994 – 11 December 1996 (lost election)	2 years, 326 days	Independent	Appointed
3		Alexander Surikov (born 1940)	11 December 1996 – 14 April 2004 (lost re-election)	7 years, 125 days	Independent	1996; 2000
4		Mikhail Yevdokimov (1957–2005)	14 April 2004 – 7 August 2005 (died in office)	1 year, 115 days	Independent	2004
–		Mikhail Kozlov (born 1951)	7 August 2005 – 24 August 2005	17 days	Civilian Power	Acting
5		Alexander Karlin (born 1951)	25 August 2005 – 31 July 2014 (resigned)	12 years, 278 days	United Russia	2005; 2009
—		Alexander Karlin (born 1951)	31 July 2014 – 25 September 2014	12 years, 278 days	United Russia	Acting
(5)		Alexander Karlin (born 1951)	25 September 2014 – 30 May 2018 (resigned)	12 years, 278 days	United Russia	2014
—		Viktor Tomenko (born 1972)	30 May 2018 – 17 September 2018	8 years, 100 days	United Russia	Acting
6		Viktor Tomenko (born 1972)	17 September 2018 – present	8 years, 100 days	United Russia	2018; 2023
