= Mikhail Kozlov (politician) =

Russian politician

- Михаил Козлов

Head of Administration of Altai Krai (acting)
- In office 7 August 2005 – 24 August 2005
- Preceded by: Mikhail Evdokimov
- Succeeded by: Alexander Karlin

Personal details
- Born: Mikhail Sergeyevich Kozlov; 27 October 1951 (age 74) Pechora, Komi ASSR, Russian SFSR, Soviet Union
- Party: United Russia (since 2005)
- Other political affiliations: Civilian Power (2000-2005)

Mikhail Sergeyevich Kozlov (Russian: Михаил Сергеевич Козлов; born 27 October 1951), is a Russian statesman who was the acting Governor (Head) of Altai Krai in August 2005.

He was appointed to this post by the President of the Russian Federation, Vladimir Putin, after governor Mikhail Evdokimov died in a car accident on August 7 of the same year.

He has the federal state civilian service rank of 1st class Active State Councillor of the Russian Federation.

== Biography ==
Mikhail Kozlov was born on 27 October 1951, in Pechora, Komi Autonomous Soviet Socialist Republic. He graduated from the Tomsk Institute of Radio Electronics and Electronic Engineering with a degree in industrial electronics in 1973.

In 1973, he worked as an electrician on duty at the Azovstal plant. In 1974, Kozlov moved to Kyzyl in the Tuva Autonomous Soviet Socialist Republic. At various times he worked as the head of the automatic telephone exchange, the chief engineer of the Kyzyl city communication center. For two years until 1982 he worked as an instructor at the Council of Ministers of the Tuva ASSR.

From 1982 to 1984, he was the leading engineer at the USSR State Committee for Television and Radio Broadcasting. He held leading positions in the State Planning Committee, the Supreme Council, and the Supreme Khural of the Tuva ASSR.

He graduated from the Academy of National Economy under the Government of Russia in 1992.

From 1997 to 1998, he worked at the State Committee of Russia for the Development of the North.

From 1998 to 1999, he was Deputy Head of the Directorate of Territorial Bodies of the Ministry of Regional Policy of Russia.

In 2000, Kozlov served as the Plenipotentiary Representative in the Republic of Tuva. From August 2000 to December 2001, he was the chief federal inspector in the Republic of Khakassia.

From December 2001 to November 2002, he was the head of the department of affairs, and from November 2002 to October 2003, he was the advisor to the Chairman of the Federation Council, Sergey Mironov.

From 2003 to 2005, he worked at the Accounts Chamber of Russia.

On 5 May 2005, Kozlov was appointed deputy head of the administration of the Altai Krai by Mikhail Evdokimov. After Evdokimov's death on 7 August, Kozlov served as the governor of the region for 14 days until 25 August.

From 2006 to 2008, Kozlov served as Deputy Prime Minister of the Altai Republic, the plenipotentiary representative of the region in Moscow.

On 9 April 2012, Kozlov began holding the post as the First Deputy Chairman of the Government of the Republic of Tuva, serving under Sholban Kara-ool.
