= Alexander Terentyev (politician) =

Russian politician

Alexander Terentyev MP
- Александр Терентьев
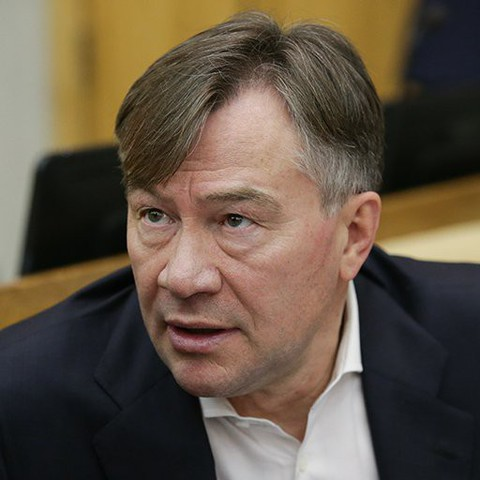

Member of the State Duma (Party List Seat)
- Incumbent
- Assumed office 24 December 2007

Personal details
- Born: 1 January 1961 (age 65) Karabiday, Sharbakty District, Pavlodar Region, Kazakh SSR, Soviet Union
- Party: A Just Russia — For Truth
- Education: Tavrida National V.I. Vernadsky University

Alexander Vasilyevich Terentyev (Russian: Александр Васильевич Терентьев; born 1 January 1961) is a Russian political figure and a deputy of the 5th, 6th, 7th, and 8th State Dumas.

== Biography ==
Alexander Terentyev was born in 1961 in the village of Karabiday, Shcherbaktinsky District, Pavlodar Region of the Kazakh SSR (now the Republic of Kazakhstan). He completed his secondary education in Crimea.

After finishing school, he entered a vocational technical school, where he trained as a mobile crane operator. He worked for the Perekop mobile mechanized column (PMK-36). Following his military service, he was employed in the construction management department of the Azovstal Construction Trust.

In 2002, he graduated from V. I. Vernadsky Taurida National University with a degree in Management of Organizations.

== Controversies ==
In 2013, reports appeared alleging that Alexander Terentyev was the owner of a foreign company with accounts in the offshore firm Targis Universal, Corp. The deputy denied all accusations, stating that the matter might concern a namesake.

== Career ==
Noyabrskneftegaz, Naftasib, P.F.K. – Dom LLC. In 2006, he joined the A Just Russia — For Truth. On 2 December 2007 he was elected deputy of the 5th State Duma from the Altai Krai constituency. In 2011, 2016, and 2021, he was re-elected for the 6th, 7th, and 8th State Dumas.

== Sanctions ==
Terentyev was sanctioned by the UK government in 2022 in relation to the Russo-Ukrainian War.
