= Viktor Tomenko =

Russian politician

- Виктор Томенко
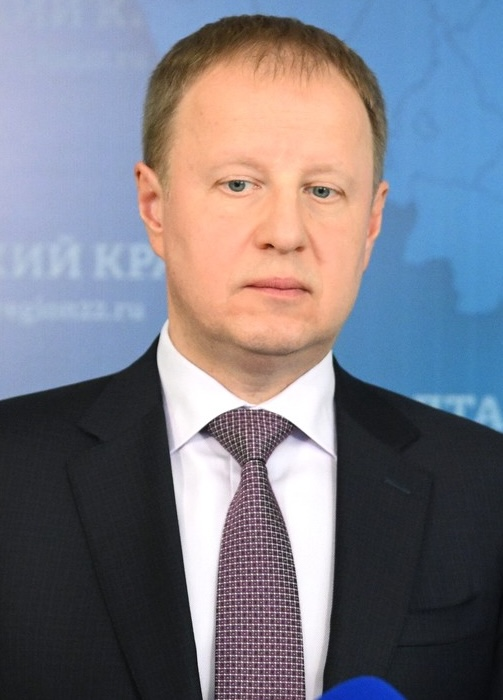
- Tomenko in 2024

6th Governor of Altai Krai
- Incumbent
- Assumed office 17 September 2018
- Preceded by: Alexander Karlin

Governor of Altai Krai (acting)
- In office 30 May 2018 – 17 September 2018

Chairman of the Government of the Krasnoyarsk Krai
- In office 9 February 2012 – 30 May 2018
- Preceded by: Edkham Akbulatov
- Succeeded by: Yury Lapshin

Personal details
- Born: Viktor Petrovich Tomenko; 12 May 1971 (age 55) Norilsk, Russian SFSR, Soviet Union
- Party: United Russia
- Spouse: Tatyana Valdimirovna Tomenko
- Children: Galina Viktorovna Tomenko

Viktor Petrovich Tomenko (Russian: Виктор Петрович Томенко; born 12 May 1971) is a Russian statesman who is currently serving as the Governor of Altai Krai since 17 September 2018.

== Career ==
Viktor Tomenko was born in Norilsk on 12 May 1971. From 1988-1996 he worked in various positions at the Norilsk Mining and Metallurgical Plant. He graduated with honors from the Norilsk Industrial Institute in 1993 with a degree in Economics and Management in Non-Ferrous Metallurgy.

In 1996 he became chief accountant of CJSC Polygon-Taimyr, moving on a year later to the same position at JSC Norilsk Combine, remaining with that company in various positions until 2010. In that year Lev Kuznetsov, the Governor of Krasnoyarsk Krai, appointed him deputy governor. He also became deputy chairman.

On 14 December 2011, Tomenko became acting head of the government of Krasnoyarsk Krai when the previous chairman, Edkham Akbulatov, left his post. He continued to hold various positions in the government until 2018, including First Deputy Governor, Chairman, and interim posts.

=== Governor of Altai Krai ===
On 30 May 2018, President Vladimir Putin appointed Tomenko the acting Governor of Altai Krai. In September, he was elected to the position with 53.61% of the vote. He soon extinguished inter-elite conflicts in the region. The level of trust in Tomenko as of March 2019, according to the Public Opinion Foundation, was 45%. In the Medialogy rating of March 2019, Tomenko was ranked 37th among the heads of regions with 3139 messages.

At the first meeting with journalists after his election, Viktor Tomenko said, "For the rest of my life, the Altai Krai will be my destiny, and we will have a common destiny." He went on to say, “I would not want to be governor for 20 or 25 years, even if it were possible. For the sake of the health of the system, for the sake of maintaining real democracy, turnover of power and the like, we must leave.” He said he was not a fatalist, but "there is such a concept - this is how fate has developed or how life has developed." He added, “I just don't know who runs it.”

On 9 May 2019, he took part in the Immortal Regiment campaign in Barnaul. He walked with portraits of his maternal grandparents, Yulia and Pavel Melchenko. Since 27 January 2020, he has been a member of the Presidium of the State Council of Russia.

=== Sanctions ===
He was sanctioned by the UK government in 2022 in relation to the Russo-Ukrainian War.

== Family ==
Tomenko is married to Tatyana Vladimirovna.
