= Alexander Karlin =

Russian politician (born 1951)

- Александр Карлин
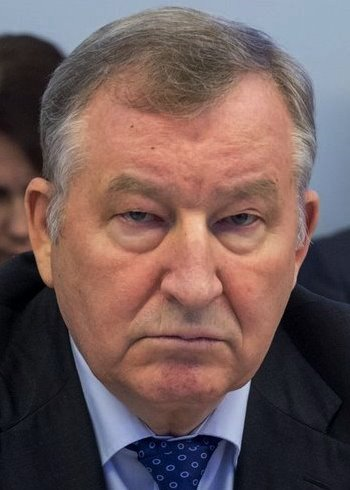
- Karlin in 2018

Russian Federation Senator from Altai Krai
- Incumbent
- Assumed office 17 September 2018
- Preceded by: Mikhail Shchetinin

5th Governor of Altai Krai
- In office 25 August 2005 – 30 May 2018
- Preceded by: Mikhail Yevdokimov, Mikhail Kozlov (acting)
- Succeeded by: Viktor Tomenko

Personal details
- Born: 29 October 1951 (age 74) Medvedka, Tyumentsevsky District, Altai Krai, Russian SFSR, Soviet Union
- Party: United Russia
- Spouse: Galina Carlin
- Profession: Lawyer

Alexander Bogdanovich Karlin (Russian: Александр Богданович Карлин; born 29 October 1951) is a Russian politician. He has the federal state civilian service rank of 1st class Active State Councillor of the Russian Federation.

He served as the Governor of Altai Krai from 2005 until 2018. He became Head of Altai Krai in 2005, replacing Mikhail Kozlov, who assumed the post of acting head after the death of Mikhail Yevdokimov. In December 2007, the administration changed the title of the position to the Governor of Altai Krai. In July 2014, he resigned from his post, but was immediately appointed as the acting governor and ran in the September 2014 elections. In the election, he took 73% of the vote, defeating Sergey Yurchenko, who managed on 11%.

On 13 August 2010 Alexander Karlin made a controversial decision to fire the mayor of Barnaul who was legitimately elected in 2008.

On 30 May 2018 Karlin resigned as Governor with immediate effect.

== International sanctions ==
On March 9, 2022, amid Russia’s invasion of Ukraine, he was added to the sanctions list of all European Union member states for voting in favor of ratifying the treaties of friendship with the self-proclaimed LPR and DPR.

On September 30, 2022, he was added to the sanctions list of the United States “for Putin’s annexation of regions of Ukraine” and for supporting the so-called fake news law. The U.S. Department of State noted that senators “voted to approve Putin’s request to send troops into Ukraine, which served as an unjustified pretext for Russia’s full-scale invasion of Ukraine.”

On March 24, 2022, he was included in Canada’s list of “regime associates” for “aiding in the violation of Ukraine’s sovereignty and territorial integrity.”

On similar grounds, since March 15, 2022, he has been under sanctions by the United Kingdom. Since March 16, 2022, he has been under sanctions by Switzerland. Since April 21, 2022, he has been under sanctions by Australia.By decree of Ukrainian president Volodymyr Zelenskyy dated September 7, 2022, he has been under sanctions by Ukraine.Since May 3, 2022, he has been under sanctions by New Zealand.
