= Altai State Technical University =

Technical university in Barnaul, Russia

Coordinates: 53°21′N 83°47′E

- Алтайский Государственный Технический Университет (АлтГТУ)
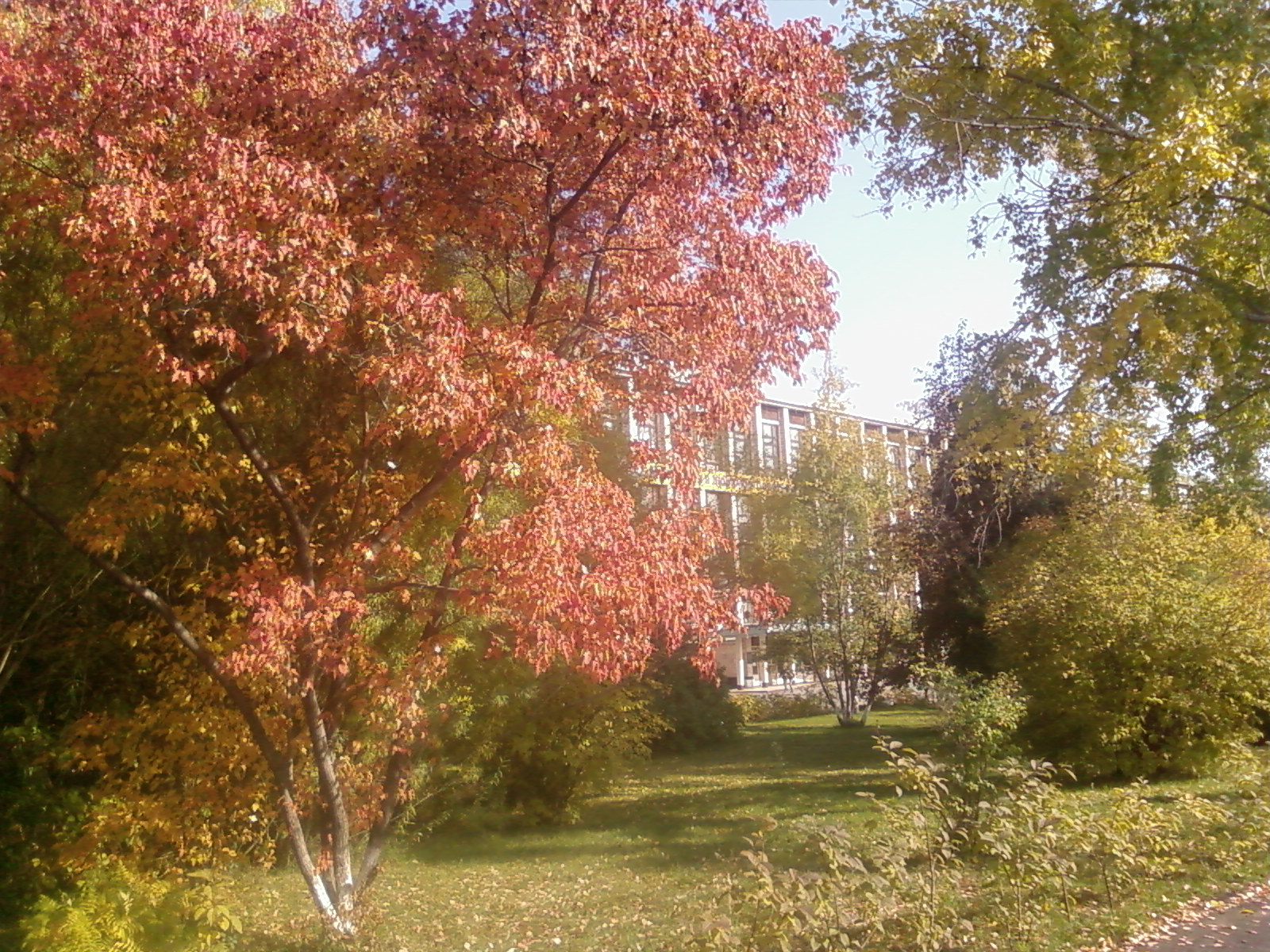
- Type: State founded
- Established: 1942
- Rector: Andrey Markov
- Students: 20,000 (900 international)
- Location: Barnaul, Russia
- Campus: in the center of Barnaul
- Website: https://en.altstu.ru/

University rankings

Regional – Overall
- QS Emerging Europe and Central Asia: 351-400 (2022)

The leading technological and scientific university of the Altai region, Altai State Technical University (AltSTU) is one of a number of universities in the city of Barnaul, Altai Krai, Russia, and is among the largest institutions of higher education in Russia.

It was founded in February 1942 by Zaporizhie Automechanical Institute (which was evacuated to Siberia because of World War II). Altai State University is named after Ivan Polzunov, the inventor of the two-cylinder steam engine for use in the mining industry.

The university offers full-time, part-time, extramural, and distance instruction. On graduating, students receive degrees of Bachelor (four-year study), Master (two years), and specialist diplomas (per the old system of five-year study). Post-graduate courses are also offered.

University facilities include seven academic buildings, hostels, a scientific library, a computing center, a publishing house, student clubs, a theater (the Kaleidoscope Student Theatre), a preventive clinic, as well as a skiing lodge, a private Olympiyskiy swimming pool, and a sports and rest camp.

== Recognition ==
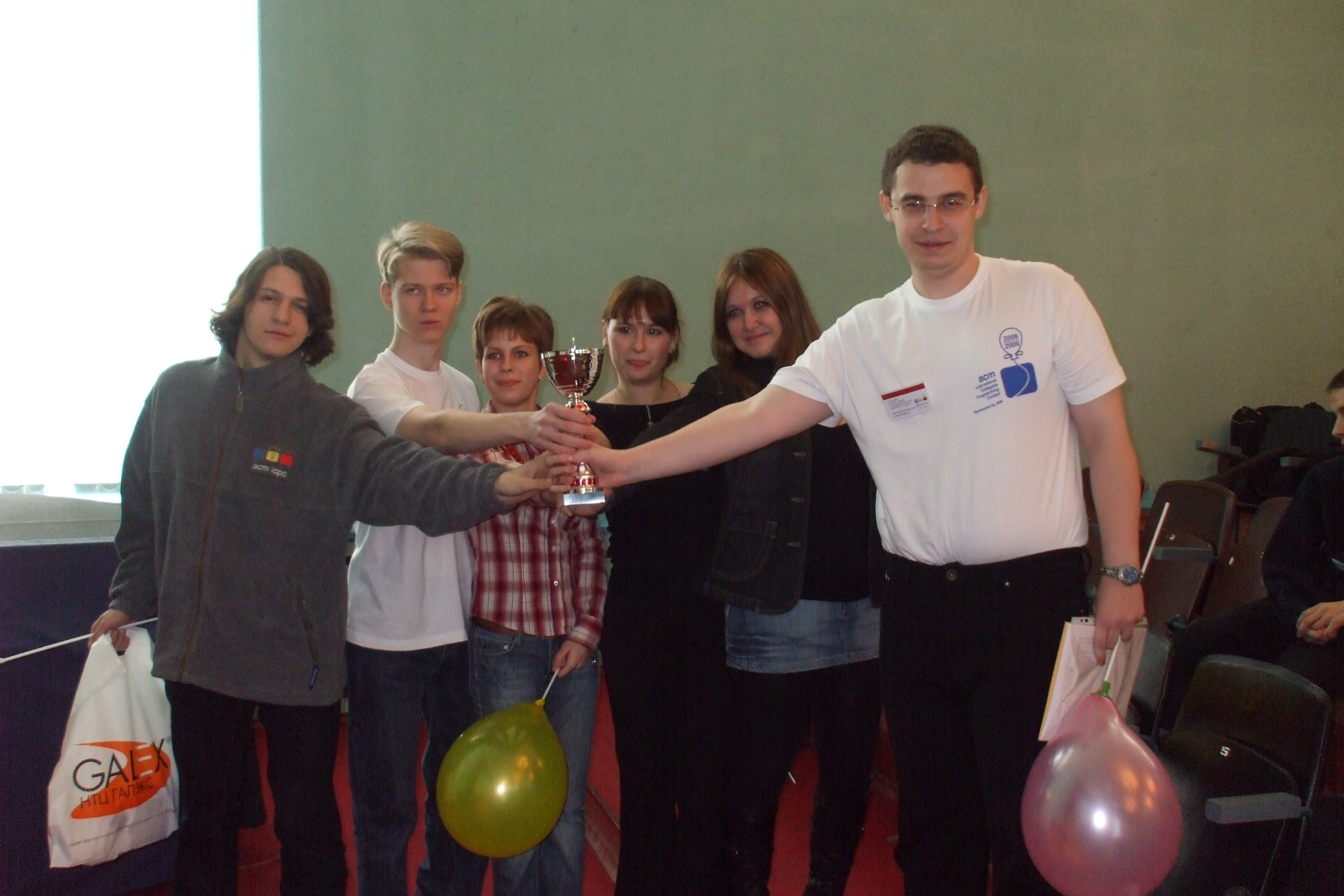
AltSTU Programming Team and Fans (2008)

Altai State Technical University annually co-hosts Russian semi-finals of the international competitive programming team contest ICPC. Siberian and Far Eastern, Kazakhstan and Kyrgyzstan teams are gathering in Barnaul, at the same time, teams from the European part gather in another center, St. Petersburg, Russia, and with the use of the Internet results are synchronized. AltSTU teams from students of the specialty "Software Engineering" (Faculty of Information Technology), as a result of selection, reached the final of this championship and won prizes:

- ACM ICPC 2006 final (San Antonio, United States) - AltSTU won a gold medal, 3rd absolute place;
- ACM ICPC 2009 final (Stockholm, Sweden) - AltSTU won a silver medal, 8th absolute place.

In January 2019, a Biysk Technological Institute (AltSTU branch) project to develop physical principles of ultrasonic drilling of the surface of extraterrestrial objects to detect water and ice won a collaboration grant from RFBR and National Natural Science Foundation of China. The grant amounted to 1.3 million Rubles (€14,470) a year, and the project itself was planned for two years.

In 2019, the university was among the winners of the "Best educational programs of innovative Russia" contest.
