= Altai Krai Legislative Assembly =

Regional parliament of Altai Krai, Russia

Altai Krai Legislative Assembly Алтайское краевое Законодательное Собрание
- 9th legislature

Type
- Type: Unicameral

Leadership
- Chairman: Alexander Romanenko, United Russia since 6 October 2016

Structure
- Seats: 68
- Political groups: United Russia (51); CPRF (7); LDPR (4); New People (4); A Just Russia (2)

Elections
- Voting system: Mixed
- Last election: 20 September 2026
- Next election: 2031

Website
- akzs.ru

The Altai Krai Legislative Assembly (Russian: Алтайское краевое Законодательное Собрание) is the regional parliament of Altai Krai, a federal subject of Russia.

The assembly consists of 68 deputies elected for a term of five years. 34 deputies are elected by single-member constituencies and another 34 deputies are elected in party lists.

== History ==
The first Legislative Assembly convened in March 1994. Alexander Surikov was elected its chairman. On 20 April 1995, the Charter of Altai Krai was adopted. From 1999 to 2007 the assembly was known as the Altai Krai Council of People's Deputies.

== Composition ==
Party	Seats								
Party	1994	1996	2000	2004	2008	2011	2016	2021	2026
United Russia			27 (Note: as United Russia — Union of Industrialists)	36	43	47	43	31	51
Communist Party	19 (Note: as United Communist-Agrarian faction)	26 (Note: as "For Democracy" faction)	20	13 (Note: as "For Our Altai" faction)	7	9	8	24	7
Liberal Democratic Party					6	6	9	4	4
A Just Russia				9	8	5	6	5	2
Others	31	24 (Note: 11 Union of Industrialists, 13 Independents)	3	3				4 (CR)	4 (NL)
Total	50	50	50	68	68	68	68	68	68

== Latest election ==
Party	%	Seats
United Russia	34.33	31
Communist Party of the Russian Federation	24.04	24
A Just Russia — For Truth	13.68	5
Communists of Russia	12.08	4
Liberal Democratic Party of Russia	10.72	4
Yabloko	1.71	0
Registered voters/turnout	39.72	

== Chairpersons ==
- Alexander Surikov - 1994 to 1996
- Aleksandr Nazarchuk - 1996 to 2008
- Ivan Loor - 2008 to 2016
- Alexander Romanenko - 2016 to present
