= Altai Krai =

First-level administrative division of Russia

Altai Krai Алтайский край (Russian)
- Krai
- Flag Coat of arms

- Coordinates: 52°46′N 82°37′E
- Country: Russia
- Federal district: Siberian
- Economic region: West Siberian
- Established: September 28, 1937
- Administrative center: Barnaul

Government
  - Body: Legislative Assembly
  - Governor: Viktor Tomenko

Area
  - Total: 167,996 km^{2} (64,864 sq mi)
  - Rank: 22nd

Population (2021 census)
  - Total: 2,163,693
  - Estimate (2018): 2,350,080
  - Rank: 22nd
  - Density: 12.8794/km^{2} (33.3576/sq mi)
  - Urban: 58.1%
  - Rural: 41.9%

GDP (nominal, 2024)
  - Total: ₽1.02 trillion (US$12.02 billion)
  - Per capita: ₽482,474 (US$5,661.44)
- Time zone: UTC+7 (MSK+4)
- ISO 3166 code: RU-ALT
- License plates: 22
- OKTMO ID: 01000000
- Official languages: Russian
- Website: http://www.altairegion22.ru

Altai Krai (Note: Russian: Алтайский край, IPA: [ɐlˈtajskʲɪj kraj]) is a federal subject of Russia (a krai). It borders, clockwise from the west, Kazakhstan (East Kazakhstan Region, Abai Region and Pavlodar Region), Novosibirsk and Kemerovo, and the Altai Republic. Its administrative centre is the city of Barnaul. As of the 2021 Census, the population of the krai was 2,163,693.

== Name ==
The region is named after the Altai Mountains.

== History ==
Bone fragments of the Denisova hominin originate from the Denisova Cave in Altai Krai.

This area is part of a great crossroads in the ancient world. Nomadic tribes crossed through the territory during periods of migration. These nomadic tribes consisted of different peoples. Archeological sites reveal that ancient humans lived in the area. The Altay people are a Turkic people, some of whom settled here, who were originally nomadic and date back to the 2nd millennium BC.

The territory of the krai has been controlled by the Xiongnu Empire (209 BC–93 AD), the Rouran Khaganate (330–555), the Mongol Empire (1206–1368), the Golden Horde, the Northern Yuan (1368–1691) and the Zunghar Khanate (1634–1758).

After the Russian Revolution and the rise of the Russian Soviet Federative Socialist Republic, the policy of war communism was imposed on the rural population of Altai Krai, destroying the livelihood of many local farmers. In response, the peasant rebellion of Sorokino broke out in 1921; this uprising was quickly crushed by the Red Army. Many locals who had taken part in the rebellion were later put on trial and convicted to hard labor or execution, in accordance with NKVD Order No. 00447 in 1937.

During the interwar period, the Soviet state collectivised the livestock and husbandry activities of the Altai population within Altai Krai, resulting in local resistance to the measures and their subsequent migration, with their herds, to China and Mongolia.

In June 1942 Altai Krai was one of the territories to which the families of men deported from Eastern Europe, in particular "foreigners" and "other ethnicities" such as Kola Norwegians, Lithuanians and Latvians, by Soviet Russia to GULAG hard labor camps.

== Geography ==
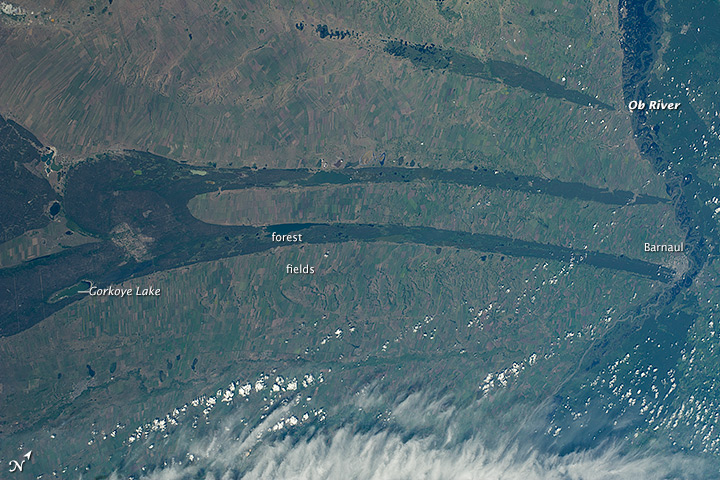
Ob Plateau, Altai Krai. The east–west "spikes" are ravines in the surface of the area; they lie slightly lower than the surrounding, lighter-toned agricultural lands. The dark zones are forested with pines and dotted with salt-rich lakes. The image shows a distance of a little more than 300 km (190 mi) from left to right, and the forested spikes are nearly that length. Barnaul is at center right, on the Ob River.

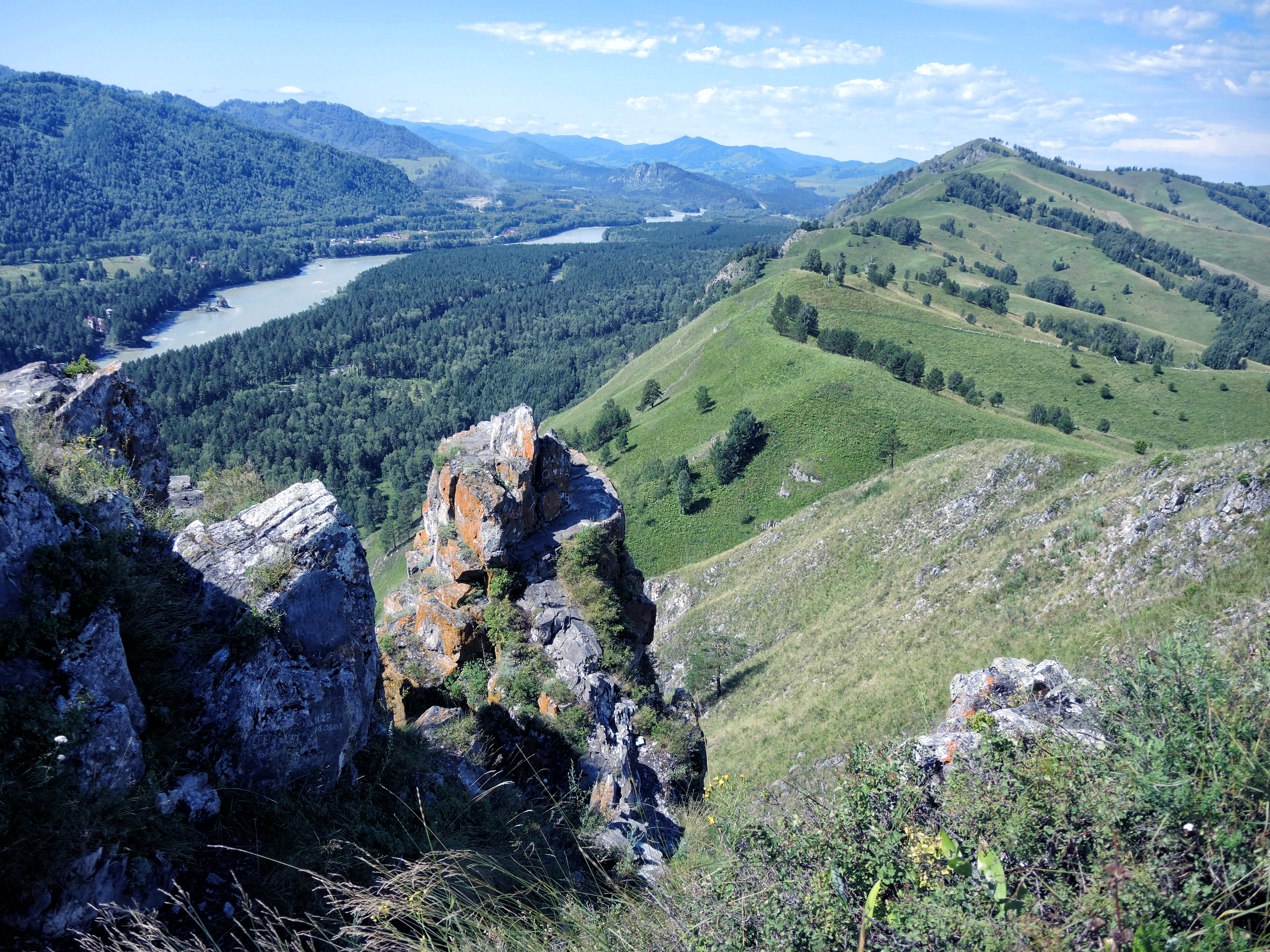
Devil Mountain, Altaysky District

Altai Krai has rolling foothills, grasslands, lakes, rivers, and mountains. The highest point of the krai is the 2,490-metre (8,170 ft) tall Mayak Shangina.

The climate is severe with long cold dry winters and hot, usually dry summers. The region's main waterway is the Ob River, which gives its name to the Ob Plateau. The Biya and Katun Rivers are also important. The biggest lakes are Lake Kulunda, Lake Kuchuk, Bolshoye Topolnoye, Bolshoye Yarovoye and Lake Mikhaylov.

Altai Krai has rich natural resources, including lumber, as well as significant mineral reserves. These include the nonferrous metals lead, manganese, tungsten, molybdenum, bauxite, and gold, as well as iron ore. Forests cover about 60,000 km^{2} (23,000 sq mi) of the krai's land. See also Geography of South-Central Siberia.

This region of Siberia is extremely important due to its biodiversity, an area of over 1.6 million hectares (16,000 square kilometres; 6,200 square miles) is recognised by UNESCO as a World Heritage Site. The area is home to animals considered rare, including the endangered snow leopard.

== Heraldry ==
=== Flag ===
The flag of Altai Krai is red, with the leftmost portion blue. The blue portion contains, in golden yellow, a stylized depiction of an upright ear of wheat. Centered in the red field is the coat of arms of the territory. It is derived from the flag of the Russian Soviet Federative Socialist Republic.

=== Coat of arms ===
The coat of arms of Altai Krai was established in 2000. It includes a shield of French heraldry form with a basement of 8/10th of its height and a sharp part in the middle of the bottom part. Bottom edges of the shield are rounded. The shield is divided with a horizontal stripe into two equal parts. In the upper part has a blue background, which is a symbol of glory, is a steamy oven of the 18th century, which reflects a historical past of the krai. In the bottom part on the red background, which is a symbol of dignity, braveness and courage, is an image of the Koluvan Queen of Vases mainly in green color, which is kept in the Hermitage Museum. The shield is framed with golden wheat ears which represent agriculture as a main industry of Altai Krai.

== Politics ==
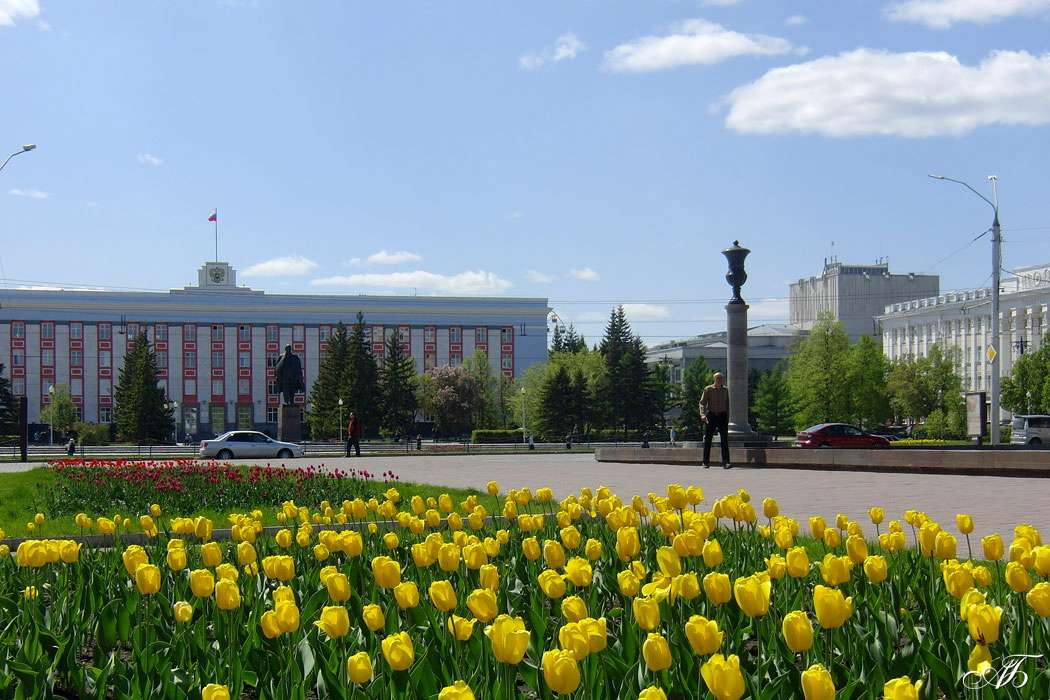
Krai Administration seat in the Soviets Square, Barnaul

During the Soviet period, the high authority in the krai was shared between three persons: The first secretary of the Altai CPSU Committee (who in reality had the most authority), the chairman of the Krai Soviet (legislative power), and the Chairman of the Krai Executive Committee (executive power). Since 1991, CPSU lost all the power, and the head of the krai administration, and eventually the governor was appointed/elected alongside elected regional parliament.

The Charter of Altai Krai is the fundamental law of the region. The Legislative Assembly of Altai Krai is the regional standing legislative (representative) body. The Legislative Assembly exercises its authority by passing laws, resolutions, and other legal acts and by supervising the implementation and observance of the laws and other legal acts passed by it. The highest executive body is the Krai Government, which includes territorial executive bodies such as district administrations, committees, and commissions that facilitate development and run the day to day matters of the province. The Krai Administration supports the activities of the Governor who is the highest official and acts as guarantor of the observance of the krai Charter in accordance with the Constitution of Russia.

On August 7, 2005, the krai's then-head of administration Mikhail Yevdokimov died in a car crash.

In the regional parliament election held in 2016, the United Russia party received 44 seats; the A Just Russia party received 6; the Communist Party and Liberal Democratic Party received 8 each.

In the State Duma of the 7th convocation (2016–2021), Altai Krai is represented by 10 deputies: Nikolai Gerasimenko, Victor Zobnev, Daniil Bessarabov, Oleg Bykov, Valery Yelykomov, Natalya Kuvshinova, Ivan Loor, and Alexander Prokopyev from United Russia; from A Just Russia – Alexander Terentyev; from the Communist Party – Sergey Shargunov. Two representatives of the region work in the Federation Council – Sergey Belousov and Alexander Karlin.

=== List of chairpersons of the Altai Krai Legislative Assembly ===
The chairperson of the Altai Krai Legislative Assembly is the presiding officer of that legislature.

==== Office-holders ====
Name	Took office	Left office
Aleksandr Surikov	1994	1996
Aleksandr Nazarchuk	1996	2008
Ivan Loor	2008	2016
Aleksandr Romanenko (politician)	2016	present

== Economy ==
As of 2013 the Krai's largest enterprises were supermarket chain Maria-Ra, coke fuel producer Altai-Koks and rolling stock manufacturer Altaivagon. Evalar – a prominent dietary supplement manufacturer – is also located in Altai Krai.

In January 2019, the average wage in Altai Krai was 23,941 RUB, which was an increase of 6.3% over the previous year.

== Demographics ==
Population: 2,163,693 (2021 census); 2,419,755 (2010 census); 2,607,426 (2002 census); 2,822,305 (1989 Soviet census).

Historical population
Year	Pop.	±%
1959	2,683,265	—
1970	2,670,261	−0.5%
1979	2,674,614	+0.2%
1989	2,822,305	+5.5%
2002	2,607,426	−7.6%
2010	2,419,755	−7.2%
2021	2,163,693	−10.6%
2025	2,098,979	−3.0%
Source: Census data, estimate

=== Ethnic groups ===
Ethnicities in Altai Krai in 2021
Ethnicity	Population	Percentage
Russians	1,863,686	95.5%
Germans	25,361	1.3%
Ukrainians	10,614	0.5%
Kazakhs	5,586	0.3%
Tajiks	5,230	0.3%
Armenians	5,100	0.3%
Other	36,856	1.8%
Ethnicity not stated	211,260	–

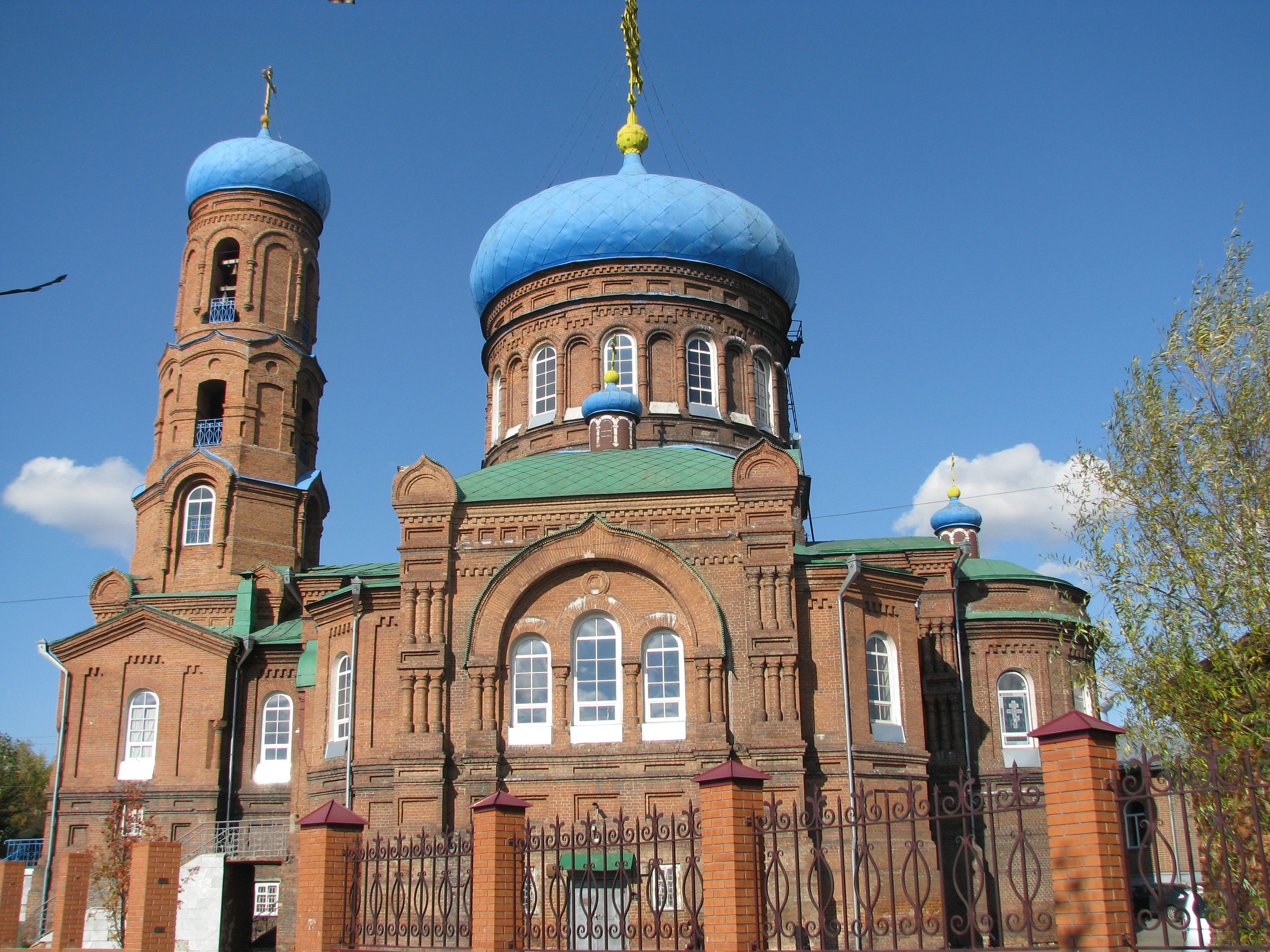
Cathedral of the Protection of the Theotokos in Barnaul, Altai Krai

Vital statistics for 2024:

- Births: 15,351 (7.3 per 1,000)
- Deaths: 32,249 (15.3 per 1,000)

Total fertility rate (2024):
1.24 children per woman

Life expectancy (2021):
Total — 68.60 years (male — 64.08, female — 73.10)

=== Settlements ===
Largest cities or towns in Altai Krai 2010 Russian Census
Rank		Administrative Division	Pop.
1	Barnaul	City of krai significance of Barnaul	612,401
2	Biysk	Biysky District	210,115
3	Rubtsovsk	Rubtsovsky District	147,002
4	Novoaltaysk	Novoaltaysk District	70,437
5	Zarinsk	Zarinsky District	48,461
6	Kamen-na-Obi	Kamensky District	43,888
7	Slavgorod	Town of krai significance of Slavgorod	32,389
8	Aleysk	Aleysky District	29,510
9	Talmenka	Talmensky District	18,814
10	Yarovoye	Town of krai significance of Yarovoye	18,604

=== Religion ===
Religion in Altai Krai as of 2012 (Sreda Arena Atlas)
Russian Orthodoxy	22.6%
Other Orthodox	1.8%
Other Christians	2.6%
Islam	1.1%
Spiritual but not religious	31.1%
Atheism and irreligion	27.4%
Other and undeclared	13.4%

According to a 2012 survey 22.6% of the population of Altay Krai adheres to the Russian Orthodox Church, 3% are unaffiliated Christians, 1% are Orthodox Christian believers without belonging to any church or are adherents of other Orthodox churches, 1% are adherents of Islam. In addition, 31% of the population declares to be "spiritual but not religious", 27% is atheist, and 14.4% follows other religions or did not give an answer to the question.

== Sister district ==
- Xinjiang, China

== See also ==
- Altai Mountains
- Denisova Cave
- Karasuk languages
- List of Chairmen of the Altai Krai Legislative Assembly
- Sayan Mountains
