= 2021 Altai Krai Legislative Assembly election =

- 19 September 2021
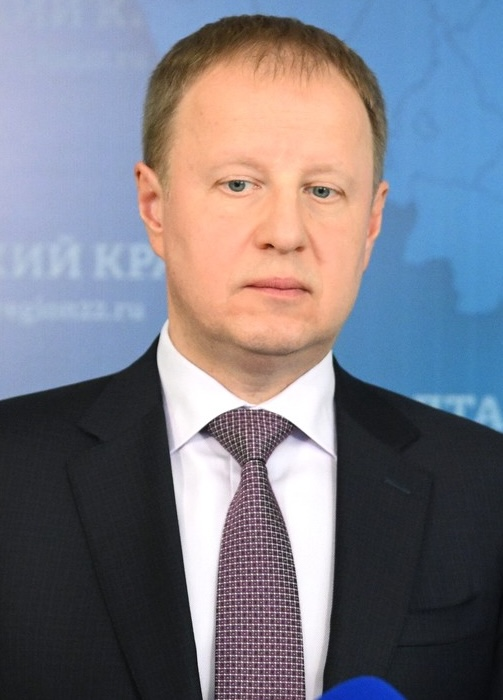

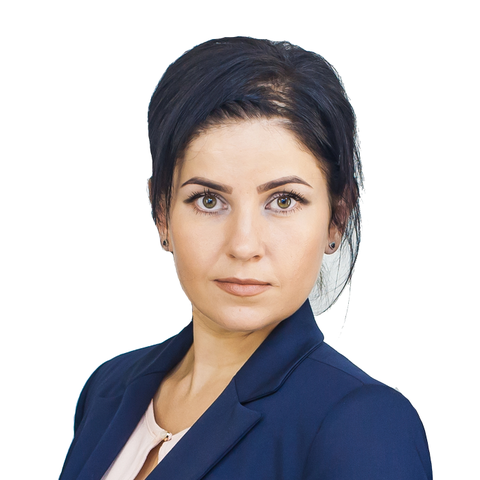

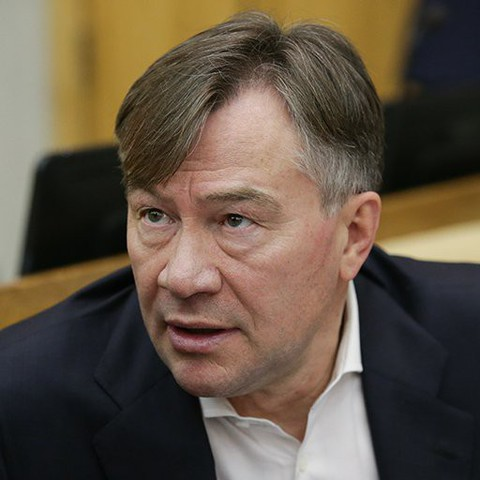

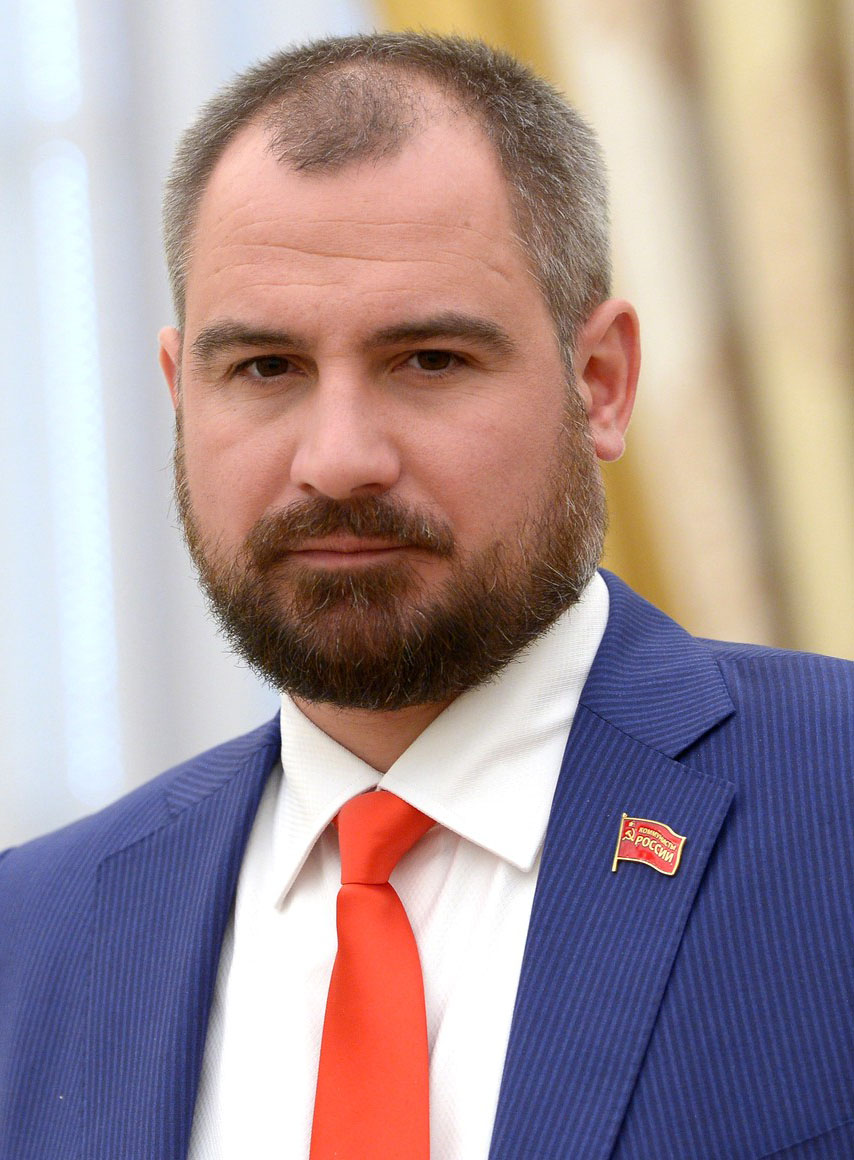

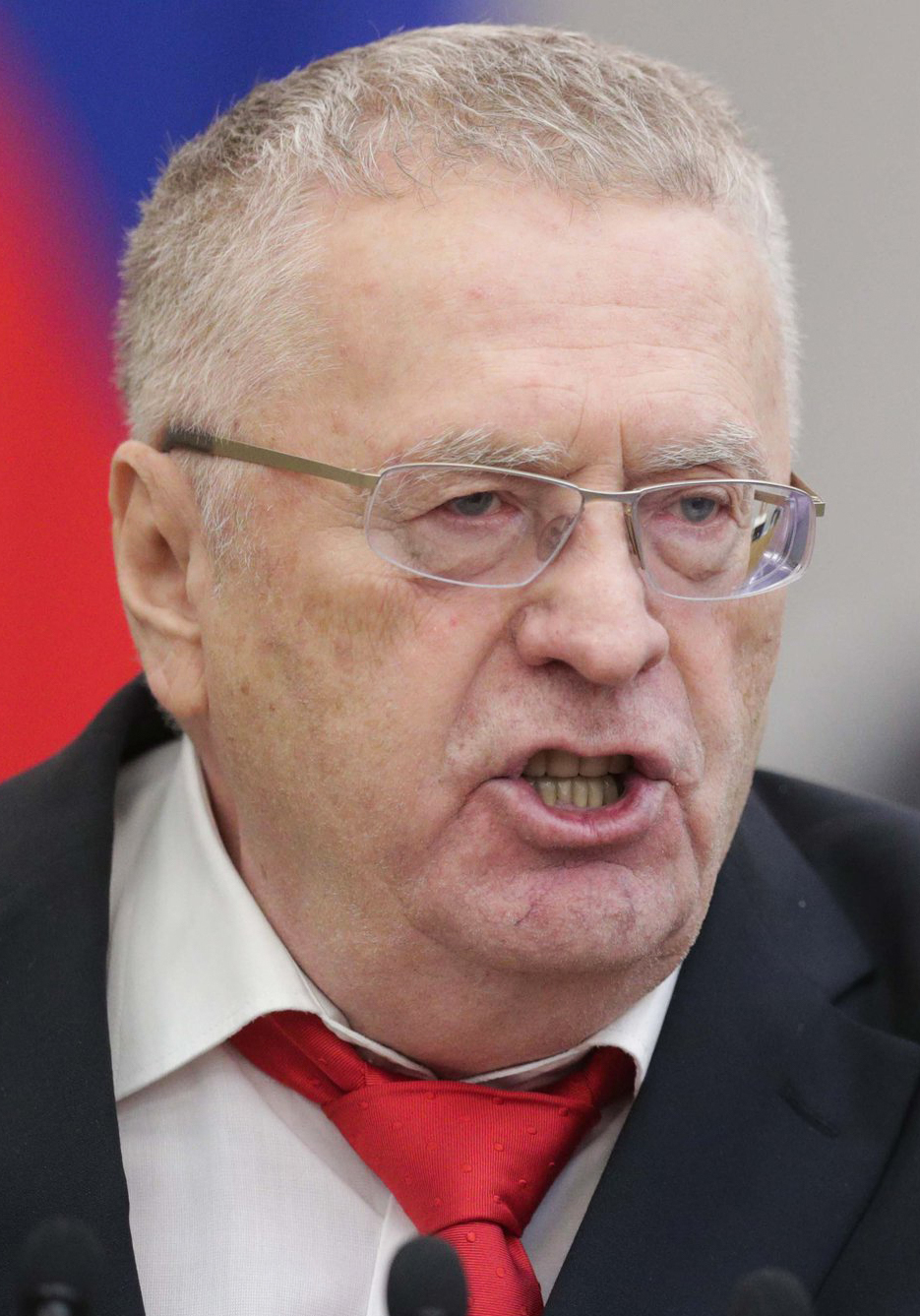
	Majority party	Minority party	Third party
Candidate	Viktor Tomenko	Maria Prusakova	Aleksandr Terentyev
Leader	Sergey Shoygu	Gennady Zyuganov	Sergey Mironov
Party	United Russia	CPRF	SRZP
Last election	42 seats, 34,08%	8 seats, 21,01%	6 seats, 17,41%
Seats won	31	24	5
Seat change	▼11	▲16	▼1
Popular vote	243,686	170,594	97,081
Percentage	34.33%	24.04%	13.68%
	Fourth party	Fifth party
Candidate	Maxim Suraykin	Vladimir Zhirinovsky
Leader	Maxim Suraykin	Vladimir Zhirinovsky
Party	CPCR	LDPR
Last election	DNP	9 seats, 21,18%
Seats won	4	4
Seat change	▲4	▼5
Popular vote	85,705	76,058
Percentage	12.08%	10.72%

Altai Krai Legislative Assembly election was held in Altai Krai on 19 September 2021 along with State duma elections in Russia.

68 deputies are elected according to the mixed electoral system. 34 deputies are elected according to party lists (proportional representation) for which a 5% threshold is established, and the distribution of seats between lists that received more than 5% of the vote takes place according to the formula. The other 34 deputies are elected in single-mandate constituencies (plurality voting), won by the majority of votes. The term of office is five years.

As of July 1, 2021, 1,792,470 voters were registered in the Altai Krai.

== Candidates ==
=== Registration ===
To register regional lists of candidates, parties need to collect voter signatures in the amount of 0.5%.

To register a candidate nominated in a single-mandate constituency, it is necessary to collect voter signatures in the amount of 3%.

The Election Commission of Altai Krai published a list of 5 parties with the right to nominate their candidates, without collecting:

- United Russia
- Communist Party of the Russian Federation
- Liberal Democratic Party of Russia
- A Just Russia — For Truth
- Yabloko

=== By Party Lists ===
No.	Party	Krai-wide Party-list	Candidates in the list	Territorial groups
2	United Russia	Victor Tomenko • Alexander Romanenko • Victor Zobnev	164	34
4	Communist Party of the Russian Federation	Maria Prusakova • Anton Artsibashev • Andrey Krivov	117	34
3	Liberal Democratic Party of Russia	Vladimir Zhirinovsky • Vladimir Semenov • Sergey Bulaev	98	34
5	A Just Russia — For Truth	Alexander Terentyev • Lyudmila Suslova • Alexander Molotov	156	34
6	Yabloko	Alexander Goncharenko	57	27
1	Communists of Russia	Maxim Suraykin • Sergey Matasov • Sergey Malinkovich	100	33

== Single-member constituencies ==
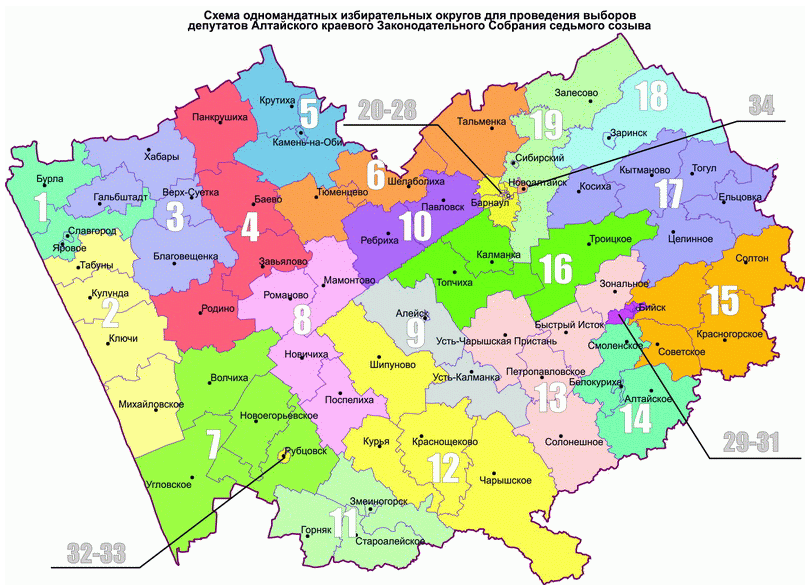
Single-member districts scheme

Single-member constituencies of Altai Krai
No.	Districts
1st	Yarovoye, Slavgorod, Burlinsky District
2nd	Tabunsky District, Mikhailovsky District, Kulundinsky District, Klyuchevsky District
3rd	Khabarsky District, Suyetsky District, Nemetsky National District, Blagoveshchensky District
4th	Rodinsky District, Pankrushikhinsky District, Zavyalovsky District, Bayevsky District
5th	Krutikhinsky District, Kamensky District
6th	Shelabolikhinsky District, Tyumentsevsky District, Talmensky District
7th	Uglovsky District, Rubtsovsky District, Yegoryevsky District, Volchikhinsky District
8th	Romanovsky District, Pospelikhinsky District, Novichikhinsky District, Mamontovsky District
9th	Ust-Kalmansky District, Aleysky District, Aleysk
10th	Rebrikhinsky District, Pavlovsky District
11th	Tretyakovsky District, Loktevsky District, Zmeinogorsky District
12th	Shipunovsky District, Charyshsky District, Kuryinsky District, Krasnoshchyokovsky District
13th	Ust-Pristansky District, Soloneshensky District, Petropavlovsky District, Zonalny District, Bystroistoksky District
14th	Smolensky District, Altaysky District, Belokurikha
15th	Soltonsky District, Sovetsky District, Krasnogorsky District, Biysky District
16th	Troitsky District, Topchikhinsky District, Kalmansky District
17th	Tselinny district, Togulsky District, Kytmanovsky District, Kosikhinsky District, Yeltsovsky District
18th	Zarinsky District, Zarinsk
19th	Pervomaisky District, Zalesovsky District, Sibirsky
20th	Barnaul city. Industrialny District (part), Zheleznodorozhny District (part)
21st	Barnaul city. Zheleznodorozhny District (part)
22nd	Barnaul city. Industrialny District (part)
23rd	Barnaul city. Industrialny District (part)
24th	Barnaul city. Leninsky District (part)
25th	Barnaul city. Leninsky District (part)
26th	Barnaul city. Oktyabrsky District (part)
27th	Barnaul city. Oktyabrsky District (part), Tsentralny District (part)
28th	Barnaul city. Tsentralny District (part)
29th	Biysk city (part)
30th	Biysk city (part)
31st	Biysk city (part)
32nd	Rubtsovsk city (part)
33rd	Rubtsovsk city (part)
34th	Novoaltaysk city
