= Rubtsovsk constituency =

Russian legislative constituency

Rubtsovsk single-member constituency
- Constituency of the Russian State Duma

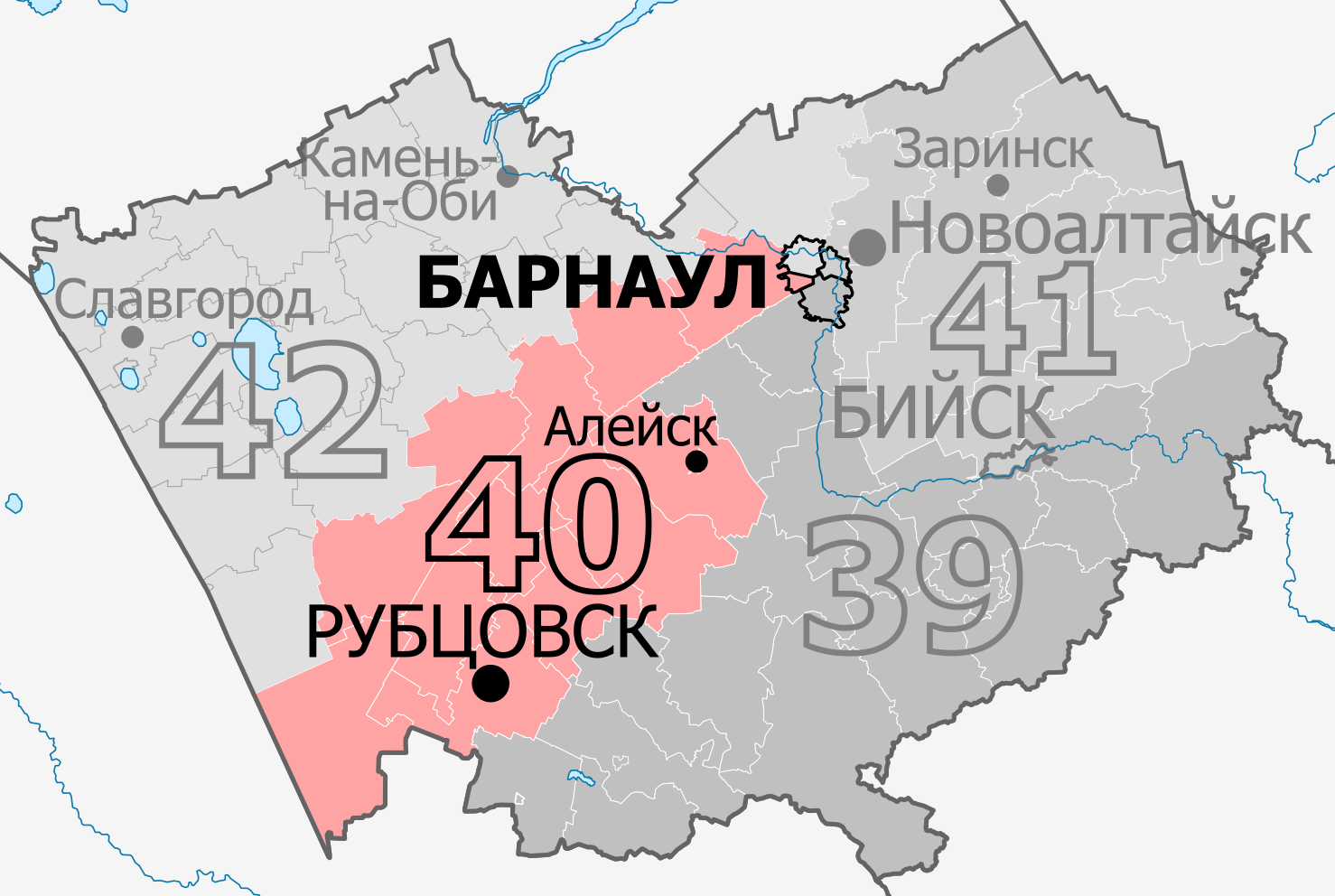
- Constituency boundaries from 2016 to 2026
- Deputy: None
- Federal subject: Altai Krai
- Districts: Aleysk, Aleysky, Barnaul (Industrialny), Mamontovsky, Novichikhinsky, Pavlovsky, Pospelikhinsky, Rebrikhinsky, Romanovsky, Rubtsovsk, Rubtsovsky, Shipunovsky, Uglovsky, Volchikhinsky, Yegoryevsky
- Voters: 485,748 (2021)

The Rubtsovsk constituency (No.40 (Note: No.37 in 1993-1995, No.36 in 1995-2003, Aleysk constituency No.35 in 2003-2007)) was a Russian legislative constituency in Altai Krai in 1993–2007 and 2016–2026. The constituency covered central Altai Krai, stretching from Barnaul to Rubtsovsk in the Krai's southwestern corner. After 2025 redistricting Altai Krai lost one of its four constituencies, so Rubtsovsk constituency was dissolved and partitioned between Barnaul and Slavgorod constituencies.

The seat was last occupied by Communist deputy Maria Prusakova, regional party office first secretary, who flipped this open seat from United Russia in the 2021 election. Prusakova initially ran in the Slavgorod constituency in 2026 but later reversed course and unsuccessfully sought re-election to the State Duma on the CPRF party list.

== Boundaries ==
1993–2003: Aleysk, Aleysky District, Belokurikha, Bystroistoksky District, Charyshsky District, Kosikhinsky District, Krasnoshchyokovsky District, Kuryinsky District, Loktevsky District, Petropavlovsky District, Pospelikhinsky District, Rubtsovsk, Rubtsovsky District, Shipunovsky District, Smolensky District, Soloneshensky District, Tretyakovsky District, Troitsky District, Ust-Kalmansky District, Ust-Pristansky District, Yegoryevsky District, Zmeinogorsk, Zmeinogorsky District, Zonalny District
The constituency covered rural central and mountainous southern Altai Krai, including the towns of Rubtsovsk, Aleysk, Zmeinogorsk, and Belokurikha resort.

2003–2007 Aleysk constituency: Aleysk, Aleysky District, Belokurikha, Bystroistoksky District, Charyshsky District, Kosikhinsky District, Krasnoshchyokovsky District, Kuryinsky District, Loktevsky District, Petropavlovsky District, Pospelikhinsky District, Rubtsovsk, Rubtsovsky District, Shipunovsky District, Smolensky District, Soloneshensky District, Tretyakovsky District, Troitsky District, Ust-Kalmansky District, Ust-Pristansky District, Yegoryevsky District, Zmeinogorsk, Zmeinogorsky District, Zonalny District
The constituency retained its territory but changed its name from Rubtsovsk to Aleysk constituency.

2016–2026: Aleysk, Aleysky District, Barnaul (Industrialny), Mamontovsky District, Novichikhinsky District, Pavlovsky District, Pospelikhinsky District, Rebrikhinsky District, Romanovsky District, Rubtsovsk, Rubtsovsky District, Shipunovsky District, Uglovsky District, Volchikhinsky District, Yegoryevsky District
The constituency was re-created for the 2016 election. This seat retained only Rubtsovsk, Aleysk and rural territory between the towns, losing all of southern Altai Krai to Barnaul constituency and its eastern edges to Biysk constituency. The constituency was pushed instead to Barnaul, gaining territories of the former Barnaul constituency (the city itself) and Slavgorod constituency (rural stretch to the city).

== Members elected ==
Election	Member	Party
1993	Vladimir Bessarabov	Independent
1995	Nikolay Gerasimenko	Independent
1999	Nikolay Gerasimenko	Independent
2003	Nikolay Gerasimenko	People's Party
2007	Proportional representation - no election by constituency	
2011	Proportional representation - no election by constituency	
2016	Viktor Zobnev	United Russia
2021	Maria Prusakova	Communist Party

== Election results ==
=== 1993 ===
==== Declared candidates ====
- Vladimir Bessarabov (Independent), prosecutor
- Oleg Khomutovsky (Independent), former Member of Altai Krai Council of People's Deputies (1990–1993) (previously ran as Kedr candidate)
- Sergey Tribunsky (Independent), chief doctor of the Loktevsky District central hospital (1989–present)
- Vladimir Vernigora (APR), former Member of Altai Krai Council of People's Deputies (1990–1993), agriculture executive

==== Results ====
Summary of the 12 December 1993 Russian legislative election in the Rubtsovsk constituency
Candidate	Party	Votes	%
Vladimir Bessarabov	Independent	76,535	25.48%
Vladimir Vernigora	Agrarian Party	70,090	23.33%
Oleg Khomutovsky	Independent	47,954	15.96%
Sergey Tribunsky	Independent	46,877	15.60%
against all		34,989	11.65%
Total		300,419	100%

=== 1995 ===
==== Declared candidates ====
- Vladimir Bessarabov (BIR), incumbent Member of State Duma (1994–present)
- Aleksandr Dorokhov (Independent), sports complex director
- Nikolay Gerasimenko (Independent), Chairman of the Altai Krai Committee on Health (1990–present)
- Vasily Korniyenko (Independent), writer
- Vladislav Sadykov (Independent), chief doctor of the Rubtsovsk city blood transfusion station
- Aleksey Shvedunov (Independent), Member of Legislative Assembly of Altai Krai (1994–present)
- Yury Visloguzov (APR), Member of Legislative Assembly of Altai Krai (1994–present), Head of Administration of Aleysky District (1991–present)
- Valery Zhogov (LDPR), journalist

==== Results ====
Summary of the 17 December 1995 Russian legislative election in the Rubtsovsk constituency
Candidate	Party	Votes	%
Nikolay Gerasimenko	Independent	110,995	31.79%
Yury Visloguzov	Agrarian Party	102,822	29.45%
Valery Zhogov	Liberal Democratic Party	34,634	9.92%
Vladimir Bessarabov (incumbent)	Ivan Rybkin Bloc	27,955	8.01%
Vladislav Sadykov	Independent	24,286	6.95%
Aleksey Shvedunov	Independent	18,928	5.42%
Aleksandr Dorokhov	Independent	4,773	1.37%
Vasily Korniyenko	Independent	2,154	0.62%
against all		17,482	5.01%
Total		349,191	100%

=== 1999 ===
==== Declared candidates ====
- Nikolay Gerasimenko (Independent), incumbent Member of State Duma (1996–present), Chairman of the Duma Committee on Health (1996–present)
- Yevgeny Pyatkov (Independent), nonprofit chairman
- Aleksey Shvedunov (Independent), former Member of Legislative Assembly of Altai Krai (1994–1996), 1995 candidate for this seat
- Vladimir Stupin (Independent), financial executive

==== Failed to qualify ====
- Tatyana Baklykova (DN), nonprofit executive

==== Did not file ====
- Leonid Desyatnik (Independent), former Akim of East Kazakhstan Region (1995–1996)
- Sergey Nesterenko (Independent), journalist
- Tatyana Vervekina (Independent), youth house director

==== Results ====
Summary of the 19 December 1999 Russian legislative election in the Rubtsovsk constituency
Candidate	Party	Votes	%
Nikolay Gerasimenko (incumbent)	Independent	198,694	61.64%
Aleksey Shvedunov	Independent	45,249	14.04%
Yevgeny Pyatkov	Independent	33,913	10.52%
Vladimir Stupin	Independent	17,764	5.51%
against all		21,609	6.70%
Total		322,359	100%

=== 2003 ===
==== Declared candidates ====
- Boris Chashchin (LDPR), motorists' rights activist
- Nikolay Gerasimenko (NPRF), incumbent Member of State Duma (1996–present), Chairman of the Duma Committee on Health and Sport (1996–present)
- Igor Levin (SPS), metallurgical plant director
- Vladimir Nikulin (Rodina), Deputy Director of the Altai Krai Department of Foreign Economic Affairs (2003–present)
- Vladimir Strukchinsky (Yabloko), middle school teacher
- Mikhail Zapolev (CPRF), Member of Altai Krai Council of People's Deputies (1996–present), aide to State Duma member

==== Results ====
Summary of the 7 December 2003 Russian legislative election in the Aleysk constituency
Candidate	Party	Votes	%
Nikolay Gerasimenko (incumbent)	People's Party	153,393	54.04%
Mikhail Zapolev	Communist Party	54,698	19.27%
Igor Levin	Union of Right Forces	20,261	7.14%
Boris Chashchin	Liberal Democratic Party	15,300	5.39%
Vladimir Nikulin	Rodina	9,539	3.36%
Vladimir Strukchinsky	Yabloko	4,704	1.66%
against all		21,535	7.59%
Total		283,998	100%

=== 2016 ===
==== Declared candidates ====
- Anton Kramskov (CPCR), homemaker
- Sergey Malykhin (Greens), journalist, ecological activist
- Nikolay Nazarenko (Rodina), neurologist, United Russia primary candidate
- Nina Ostanina (CPRF), chief of staff to CPRF faction in the State Duma (2011–present), former Member of State Duma (1996–2011)
- Viktor Rau (Yabloko), homeowners association chairman
- Irina Shudra (LDPR), Member of Altai Krai Legislative Assembly (2011–present), HR manager
- Vladislav Vakayev (A Just Russia), Altai State Pedagogical University associate professor
- Viktor Zobnev (United Russia), Member of Altai Krai Legislative Assembly (2008–present), machinery businessman, nephew of State Duma member Sergey Yurchenko
- Aleksandr Zonov (Party of Growth), marketing businessman

==== Failed to qualify ====
- Konstantin Polovnikov (PVO), unemployed

==== Declined ====
- Nikolay Gerasimenko (United Russia), Member of State Duma (1996–present) (lost the primary, ran on the party list)
- Sergey Yurchenko (CPRF), Member of State Duma (2011–present), 2014 gubernatorial candidate

==== Results ====
Summary of the 18 September 2016 Russian legislative election in the Rubtsovsk constituency
Candidate	Party	Votes	%
Viktor Zobnev	United Russia	60,873	30.90%
Nina Ostanina	Communist Party	32,376	16.43%
Irina Shudra	Liberal Democratic Party	32,143	16.31%
Vladislav Vakayev	A Just Russia	31,674	16.08%
Anton Kramskov	Communists of Russia	10,499	5.33%
Nikolay Nazarenko	Rodina	7,968	4.04%
Viktor Rau	Yabloko	4,620	2.34%
Aleksandr Zonov	Party of Growth	3,751	1.90%
Sergey Malykhin	The Greens	3,619	1.84%
Total		197,017	100%

=== 2021 ===
Results by district: Maria Prusakova: 20–30% 30–40%; Sergey Struchenko: 20–30% 30–40%

==== Declared candidates ====
- Yevgeny Astakhovsky (Rodina), former Member of Barnaul City Duma (2012–2017), halva factory owner
- Pavel Chesnov (RPSS), former Member of Altai Krai Legislative Assembly (2004–2008)
- Viktor Dvornikov (RPPSS), pharmaceutical businessman
- Andrey Krylov (Yabloko), research lab owner, 2018 Party of Growth gubernatorial candidate
- Yelena Kurnosova (CPCR), individual entrepreneur
- Maria Prusakova (CPRF), Member of Altai Krai Legislative Assembly (2016–present)
- Irina Shudra (LDPR), Member of Altai Krai Legislative Assembly (2011–present), 2016 candidate for this seat
- Sergey Struchenko (United Russia), Deputy Chairman of the Barnaul City Duma (2017–present), Member of the City Duma (2008–present)
- Lyudmila Suslova (SR–ZP), Member of Altai Krai Legislative Assembly (2008–present), 2018 gubernatorial candidate
- Vladislav Vakayev (New People), Member of Altai Krai Legislative Assembly (2016–present), 2016 A Just Russia candidate for this seat

==== Withdrawn candidates ====
- Vladimir Popov (Independent), Member of Altai Krai Legislative Assembly (2016–present)

==== Did not file ====
- Darya Kadkina (Independent), homemaker

==== Declined ====
- Viktor Zobnev (United Russia), incumbent Member of State Duma (2016–present) (won the primary, ran for Altai Krai Legislative Assembly)

==== Results ====
Summary of the 17-19 September 2021 Russian legislative election in the Rubtsovsk constituency
Candidate	Party	Votes	%
Maria Prusakova	Communist Party	51,177	27.12%
Sergey Struchenko	United Russia	41,814	22.16%
Lyudmila Suslova	A Just Russia — For Truth	16,689	8.84%
Yelena Kurnosova	Communists of Russia	14,683	7.78%
Irina Shudra	Liberal Democratic Party	14,593	7.73%
Vladislav Vakayev	New People	14,565	7.72%
Viktor Dvornikov	Party of Pensioners	9,580	5.08%
Yevgeny Astakhovsky	Rodina	7,024	3.72%
Andrey Krylov	Yabloko	5,921	3.13%
Pavel Chesnov	Russian Party of Freedom and Justice	2,585	1.37%
Total		188,733	100%
