= Barnaul constituency =

Russian legislative constituency

Barnaul single-member constituency
- Constituency of the Russian State Duma
- Deputy: Daniil Bessarabov; United Russia
- Federal subject: Altai Krai
- Districts: Aleysk, Aleysky, Altaysky, Barnaul (Tsentralny, Zheleznodorozhny), Belokurikha, Bystroistoksky, Charyshsky, Kalmansky, Krasnoshchyokovsky, Kuryinsky, Loktevsky, Novichikhinsky, Petropavlovsky, Pospelikhinsky, Rubtsovsk, Rubtsovsky, Shipunovsky, Smolensky, Soloneshensky, Sovetsky, Topchikhinsky, Tretyakovsky, Ust-Kalmansky, Ust-Pristansky, Yegoryevsky, Zmeinogorsky
- Voters: 558,513 (2026)

The Barnaul constituency (No.44 (Note: No.35 in 1993-1995 and 2003-2007, No.34 in 1995-2003, No.39 in 2016–2026)) is a Russian legislative constituency in Altai Krai. The constituency covers part of Barnaul and southern Altai Krai.

The constituency has been represented since 2016 by United Russia deputy Daniil Bessarabov, a former Deputy Governor of Altai Krai and lawyer.

== Boundaries ==
1993–2007: Barnaul
The constituency covered the entirety of Barnaul, Altai Krai capital and largest city.

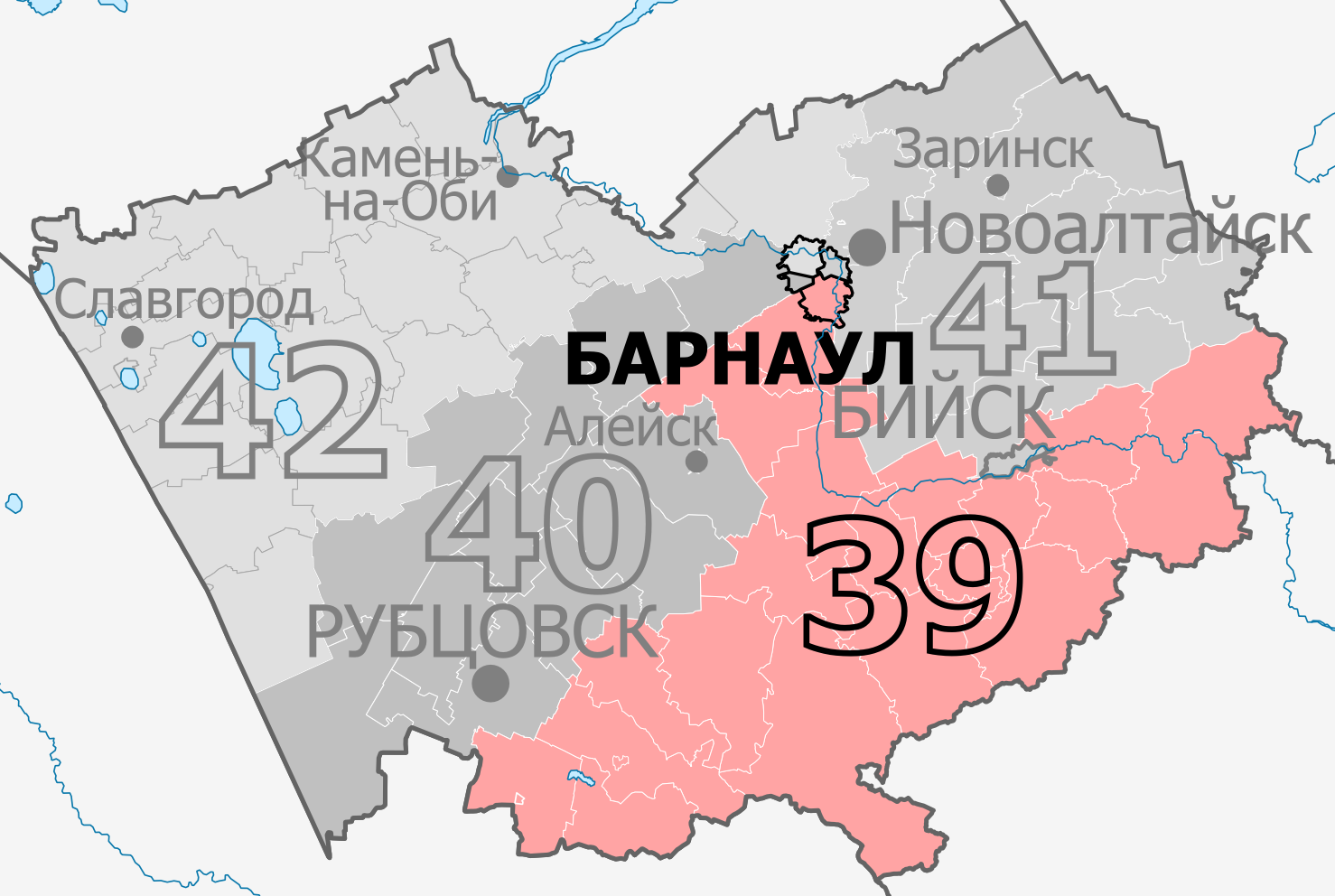
Constituency boundaries from 2016 to 2026

2016–2026: Altaysky District, Barnaul (Tsentralny, Zheleznodorozhny), Belokurikha, Biysky District, Bystroistoksky District, Charyshsky District, Kalmansky District, Krasnogorsky District, Krasnoshchyokovsky District, Kuryinsky District, Loktevsky District, Petropavlovsky District, Smolensky District, Sovetsky District, Soloneshensky District, Soltonsky District, Topchikhinsky District, Tretyakovsky District, Ust-Kalmansky District, Ust-Pristansky District, Zmeinogorsky District
The constituency was re-created for the 2016 election. This seat retained only Tsentralny and Zheleznodorozhny city districts of Barnaul, losing the rest of the city to all three other Altai Krai constituencies. The constituency, instead, was pushed to rural south, gaining half of former Aleysk constituency, as well as some districts from former Biysk and Slavgorod constituencies.

2026–present: Aleysk, Aleysky District, Altaysky District, Barnaul (Tsentralny, Zheleznodorozhny), Belokurikha, Bystroistoksky District, Charyshsky District, Kalmansky District, Krasnoshchyokovsky District, Kuryinsky District, Loktevsky District, Novichikhinsky District, Petropavlovsky District, Pospelikhinsky District, Rubtsovsk, Rubtsovsky District, Shipunovsky District, Smolensky District, Soloneshensky District, Sovetsky District, Topchikhinsky District, Tretyakovsky District, Ust-Kalmansky District, Ust-Pristansky District, Yegoryevsky District, Zmeinogorsky District
After the 2025 redistricting Altai Krai lost one of its four constituencies, so all remaining seats saw major changes. The constituency gained Aleysk and Rubtsovsk – the urban centres of the dissolved Rubtsovsk constituency, as well as rural areas between the towns. This seat shedded Biysky, Krasnogorsky and Soltansky districts in south-eastern Altai Krai to Biysk constituency.

== Members elected ==
Election	Member	Party
1993	Aleksey Sarychev	Russian Democratic Reform Movement
1995	Nina Danilova	Communist Party
1999	Vladimir Ryzhkov	Our Home – Russia
2003	Vladimir Ryzhkov	Independent
2007	Proportional representation - no election by constituency	
2011	Proportional representation - no election by constituency	
2016	Daniil Bessarabov	United Russia
2021	Daniil Bessarabov	United Russia
2026	Daniil Bessarabov	United Russia

== Election results ==
=== 1993 ===
==== Declared candidates ====
- Artur Askalonov (Independent), former People's Deputy of Russia (1990–1993)
- Aleksandr Dmitriyev (Independent), locomotive depot chief
- Gennady Kulikov (Independent), Head of Barnaul Industrialny City District (1990–present)
- Aleksey Sarychev (RDDR), Deputy Head of the Altai Krai Department of Justice (1990–present)
- Vladimir Shevtsov (Independent), chief metallurgist at Barnaultransmash

==== Results ====
Summary of the 12 December 1993 Russian legislative election in the Barnaul constituency
Candidate	Party	Votes	%
Aleksey Sarychev	Russian Democratic Reform Movement	44,362	16.26%
Artur Askalonov	Independent	–	–
Aleksandr Dmitriyev	Independent	–	–
Gennady Kulikov	Independent	–	–
Vladimir Shevtsov	Independent	–	–
Total		182,886	100%

=== 1995 ===
==== Declared candidates ====
- Pyotr Akelkin (Independent), Member of Barnaul City Duma (1994–present)
- Yury Bogdanov (Independent), Soviet-Afghan War veteran
- Nina Danilova (CPRF), Member of Legislative Assembly of Altai Krai (1994–present)
- Aleksandr Lazarev (NDR), Member of Legislative Assembly of Altai Krai (1994–present), oncological centre director
- Nikolay Makeyev (Independent), prosecutor
- Igor Marchenko (Independent), pensioner
- Sergey Potapov (Independent), Russian Centre for Privatization regional director
- Igor Rodionov (Independent), strategic consultant
- Aleksey Sarychev (Independent), incumbent Member of State Duma (1994–present)
- Yury Shmakov (LDPR), aide to State Duma member
- Viktor Stepanov (DOBRo), rector of Altai Institute of Economy and Law (1995–present)
- Lyudmila Strigina (PGL), nonprofit chairwoman
- Galina Timoshenko (Yabloko), consumers' rights advocate
- Vasily Tolstykh (Independent), businessman
- Mikhail Yevdokimov (Stable Russia), comedian, actor

==== Results ====
Summary of the 17 December 1995 Russian legislative election in the Barnaul constituency
Candidate	Party	Votes	%
Nina Danilova	Communist Party	61,813	31.33%
Aleksandr Lazarev	Our Home – Russia	45,067	18.55%
Aleksey Sarychev (incumbent)	Independent	33,593	9.79%
Pyotr Akelkin	Independent	27,929	7.64%
Yury Shmakov	Liberal Democratic Party	19,832	6.84%
Mikhail Yevdokimov	Stable Russia	18,456	3.37%
Igor Rodionov	Independent	16,075	2.55%
Galina Timoshenko	Yabloko	11,849	2.09%
Lyudmila Strigina	Pamfilova–Gurov–Lysenko	7,952	1.74%
Vasily Tolstykh	Independent	6,008	1.07%
Sergey Potapov	Independent	4,299	0.48%
Nikolay Makeyev	Independent	4,243	0.46%
Viktor Stepanov	Education — Future of Russia	4,066	1.40%
Yury Bogdanov	Independent	3,690	1.27%
Igor Marchenko	Independent	2,448	0.84%
against all		17,242	5.95%
Total		289,849	100%

=== 1999 ===
==== Declared candidates ====
- Vladimir Barsukov (LDPR), house-building plant deputy director
- Nina Danilova (CPRF), incumbent Member of State Duma (1996–present)
- Anatoly Korchagin (Independent), industrial executive
- Lev Korshunov (Independent), former Governor of Altai Krai (1994–1996), former People's Deputy of Russia (1990–1993)
- Vladimir Ryzhkov (NDR), Member of State Duma (1994–present), chairman of the NDR faction (1999–present)
- Aleksey Sarychev (SPS), former Member of State Duma (1994–1995)
- Gennady Stroitelev (Independent), entrepreneur
- Konstantin Veprov (Independent), brewery director
- Igor Zimin (Independent), businessman
- Valery Zyryanov (Independent), students' union leader

==== Withdrawn candidates ====
- Pyotr Akelkin (Independent), Member of Altai Krai Council of People's Deputies (1996–present), 1995 candidate for this seat, 1996 gubernatorial candidate
- Natalya Dorogovtseva (Independent), wife of Presidential Envoy to Altai Krai Nikolay Shuba

==== Failed to qualify ====
- Vasily Menyaylo (DN), bankruptcy trustee

==== Did not file ====
- Vadim Starchenko (Independent)
- Pyotr Vasilov (Independent)
- Yury Vinokurov (Kedr), director of the Siberian Institute of Water and Environmental Issues (1996–present)

==== Results ====
Summary of the 19 December 1999 Russian legislative election in the Barnaul constituency
Candidate	Party	Votes	%
Vladimir Ryzhkov	Our Home – Russia	102,879	53.58%
Nina Danilova (incumbent)	Communist Party	74,224	26.79%
Lev Korshunov	Independent	24,100	7.57%
Aleksey Sarychev	Union of Right Forces	14,290	4.66%
Gennady Stroitelev	Independent	11,766	3.84%
Konstantin Veprov	Independent	5,996	1.96%
Valery Zyryanov	Independent	4,189	1.37%
Vladimir Barsukov	Liberal Democratic Party	4,076	1.33%
Anatoly Korchagin	Independent	3,229	1.05%
Igor Zimin	Independent	3,003	0.98%
against all		16,950	5.53%
Total		306,390	100%

=== 2003 ===
==== Declared candidates ====
- Yekaterina Abramova (PVR-RPZh), Member of Barnaul City Duma (2000–present), nonprofit chairwoman
- Valery Andryushchenko (Independent), businessman
- Vladimir Barsukov (LDPR), manager, 1999 candidate for this seat
- Dmitry Chikalov (Independent), Member of Altai Krai Council of People's Deputies (2000–present), lyceum teacher
- Aleksandr Goncharenko (Yabloko), pediatrician
- Vladimir Kirillov (The Greens), environmental lab head
- Sergey Kovalev (ROPP), banker
- Sergey Mamayev (SDPR), entrepreneur
- Aleksandr Ovsiyevsky (CPRF), Member of Barnaul City Duma (1994–present), gymnasium principal
- Vladimir Ryzhkov (Independent), incumbent Member of State Duma (1994–present)
- Yevgeny Semenikhin (ORP Rus'), chairman of the party regional office
- Irina Solntseva (United Russia), Member of Altai Krai Council of People's Deputies (2000–present)
- Viktor Torshin (Independent), Member of Barnaul City Duma (2000–present), middle school principal

==== Withdrawn candidates ====
- Oleg Bavarin (Independent), businessman

==== Failed to qualify ====
- Svetlana Litvinova (Independent), nonprofit director

==== Did not file ====
- Yevgeny Bogomolov (Independent), teacher
- Aleksandr Chistopashin (KPE), apicultural scientist
- Tatyana Khaustova (DPR), trading executive
- Sergey Yermakov (PME), chairman of the party regional office

==== Results ====
Summary of the 7 December 2003 Russian legislative election in the Barnaul constituency
Candidate	Party	Votes	%
Vladimir Ryzhkov (incumbent)	Independent	98,606	35.10%
Aleksandr Ovsiyevsky	Communist Party	42,326	15.07%
Irina Solntseva	United Russia	38,087	13.56%
Yekaterina Abramova	Party of Russia's Rebirth-Russian Party of Life	35,425	12.61%
Dmitry Chikalov	Independent	8,353	2.97%
Aleksandr Goncharenko	Yabloko	7,874	2.80%
Vladimir Barsukov	Liberal Democratic Party	6,967	2.48%
Viktor Torshin	Independent	5,113	1.82%
Vladimir Kirillov	The Greens	3,575	1.27%
Sergey Kovalev	Russian United Industrial Party	1,325	0.47%
Sergey Mamayev	Social Democratic Party	1,261	0.45%
Yevgeny Semenikhin	United Russian Party Rus'	1,204	0.43%
Valery Andryushchenko	Independent	768	0.27%
against all		25,899	9.22%
Total		281,593	100%

=== 2016 ===
==== Declared candidates ====
- Daniil Bessarabov (United Russia), Deputy Governor of Altai Krai (2010–present), son of former State Duma member Vladimir Bessarabov
- Pavel Chesnov (Party of Growth), former Member of Altai Krai Legislative Assembly (2004–2008)
- Aleksandr Molotov (A Just Russia), Member of Altai Krai Legislative Assembly (2011–present)
- Tatyana Reznikova (GP), safety engineer
- Vladimir Ryzhkov (Yabloko), former Member of State Duma (1994–2007), former co-chairman of the People's Freedom Party (2005–2007, 2010–2014)
- Andrey Sartakov (CPRF), Member of Barnaul City Duma (2012–present), aide to State Duma member Mikhail Zapolev
- Andrey Shchukin (LDPR), Member of Altai Krai Legislative Assembly (2008–present), 2014 gubernatorial candidate

==== Failed to qualify ====
- Eduard Barchuk (PVO), businessman
- Yegor Kolesnikov (CPCR), homemaker

==== Declined ====
- Aleksandr Lazarev (United Russia), Member of Altai Krai Legislative Assembly (1994–present), oncological centre director, 1995 NDR candidate for this seat (lost the primary)

==== Results ====
Summary of the 18 September 2016 Russian legislative election in the Barnaul constituency
Candidate	Party	Votes	%
Daniil Bessarabov	United Russia	68,246	36.58%
Andrey Sartakov	Communist Party	29,847	15.99%
Andrey Shchukin	Liberal Democratic Party	25,700	13.77%
Aleksandr Molotov	A Just Russia	24,950	13.37%
Vladimir Ryzhkov	Yabloko	21,700	11.63%
Tatyana Reznikova	Civic Platform	5,498	2.95%
Pavel Chesnov	Party of Growth	2,949	1.58%
Total		186,580	100%

=== 2021 ===
==== Declared candidates ====
- Daniil Bessarabov (United Russia), incumbent Member of State Duma (2016–present)
- Valentin Borozdin (RPPSS), retired FSB colonel
- Andrey Krivov (CPRF), Altai Krai Legislative Assembly staffer
- Aleksandr Molotov (SR–ZP), Member of Altai Krai Legislative Assembly (2011–present), 2016 candidate for this seat
- Aleksey Skosyrsky (LDPR), Member of Barnaul City Duma (2012–present), businessman
- Nadezhda Zyablitseva (New People), businesswoman
- Vitaly Zyryanov (CPCR), electrician

==== Withdrawn candidates ====
- Viktor Rau (Yabloko), community activist, 2018 gubernatorial candidate (disqualified on August 17, 2021, due to Navalny Headquarters association)

==== Did not file ====
- Anatoly Maydurov (Independent), power engineer

==== Results ====
Summary of the 17-19 September 2021 Russian legislative election in the Barnaul constituency
Candidate	Party	Votes	%
Daniil Bessarabov (incumbent)	United Russia	62,196	36.56%
Andrey Krivov	Communist Party	33,194	19.51%
Vitaly Zyryanov	Communists of Russia	18,361	10.79%
Aleksandr Molotov	A Just Russia — For Truth	17,701	10.41%
Nadezhda Zyablitseva	New People	12,273	7.21%
Valentin Borozdin	Party of Pensioners	10,844	6.37%
Aleksey Skosyrsky	Liberal Democratic Party	7,937	4.67%
Total		170,114	100%

=== 2026 ===
==== Declared candidates ====
- Daniil Bessarabov (United Russia), incumbent Member of State Duma (2016–present)
- Andrey Chernobay (CPRF), Member of Altai Krai Legislative Assembly (2021–present)
- Vladimir Gulyayev (CPCR), writer
- Yelena Khrustalyova (RPPSS), Member of Altai Krai Legislative Assembly (2021–present), director of the Altai State Medical University Institute of Clinical Medicine, 2023 gubernatorial candidate
- Aleksandr Molotov (A Just Russia), Member of Altai Krai Legislative Assembly (2011–present), 2016 and 2021 candidate for this seat
- Olga Pisanova (New People), lawyer
- Artyom Reka (Yabloko), auto electrician
- Irina Shudra (LDPR), Member of Altai Krai Legislative Assembly (2011–present)

==== Did not file ====
- Irina Sashnikova (Independent), pensioner

==== Declined ====
- Andrey Krivov (CPRF), Member of Altai Krai Legislative Assembly (2021–present), 2021 candidate for this seat

==== Results ====
Summary of the 18-20 September 2026 Russian legislative election in the Barnaul constituency
Candidate	Party	Votes	%
Daniil Bessarabov (incumbent)	United Russia	103,310	42.18%
Andrey Chernobay	Communist Party	43,238	17.66%
Irina Shudra	Liberal Democratic Party	19,261	7.86%
Olga Pisanova	New People	19,179	7.83%
Aleksandr Molotov	A Just Russia	16,817	6.87%
Vladimir Gulyayev	Communists of Russia	14,627	5.97%
Yelena Khrustalyova	Party of Pensioners	12,146	4.96%
Artyom Reka	Yabloko	9,640	3.94%
Total		244,904	100%
