= Administrative divisions of Altai Krai =

Administrative divisions of a region in Russia

Altai Krai Russia
- Administrative centre: Barnaul

Administrative structure (as of 2014)
- Districts: 59
- Cities/towns: 12
- Urban-type settlements: 6
- Selsovets and rural administrations: 767

Municipal structure (as of 2002)
- Rural settlements: 1,620 (inhabited); 16 (uninhabited)

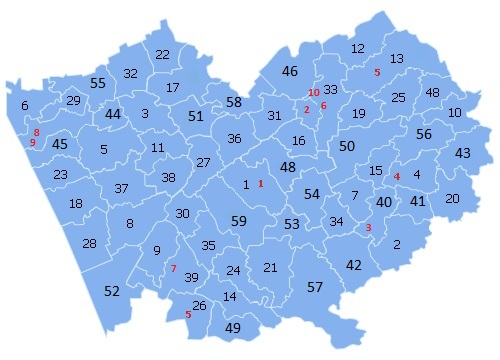
Map of the Altai Krai (with districts numbered)

Altai Krai is a federal subject of Russia.

== Administrative and municipal divisions ==
Map

Division		Structure		OKATO	OKTMO	Urban-type settlement/ district-level town*	Rural
Division		Administrative	Municipal	OKATO	OKTMO	Urban-type settlement/ district-level town*	Rural
Sibirsky (Сибирский)		Urban-type settlement (ZATO)	urban okrug	01 555	01 755		
Barnaul (Барнаул)		city	urban okrug	01 401	01 701		
↳	Industrialny (Индустриальный)	(under Barnaul)	—N/a	01 401	—N/a	Novosilikatny (Новосиликатный)	1 rural administration
↳	Leninsky (Ленинский)	(under Barnaul)	—N/a	01 401	—N/a		1 rural administration
↳	Oktyabrsky (Октябрьский)	(under Barnaul)	—N/a	01 401	—N/a		
↳	Tsentralny (Центральный)	(under Barnaul)	—N/a	01 401	—N/a	Yuzhny (Южный)	2 rural administrations
↳	Zheleznodorozhny (Железнодорожный)	(under Barnaul)	—N/a	01 401	—N/a		
Aleysk (Алейск)		city	urban okrug	01 403	01 703		
Belokurikha (Белокуриха)		city	urban okrug	01 404	01 704		
Biysk (Бийск)		city	urban okrug	01 405	01 705		
Zarinsk (Заринск)		city	urban okrug	01 406	01 706		
Novoaltaysk (Новоалтайск)		city	urban okrug	01 413	01 713		
Rubtsovsk (Рубцовск)		city	urban okrug	01 416	01 716		
Slavgorod (Славгород)		city	urban okrug	01 419	01 719		
Yarovoye (Яровое)		city	urban okrug	01 430	01 730		
Aleysky (Алейский)		district		01 201	01 601		19 selsovets
Altaysky (Алтайский)		district		01 202	01 602		10 selsovets
Bayevsky (Баевский)		district		01 203	01 603		9 selsovets
Biysky (Бийский)		district		01 204	01 604		15 selsovets
Blagoveshchensky (Благовещенский)		district		01 205	01 605	Blagoveshchenka (Благовещенка); Stepnoye Ozero (Степное Озеро)	10 selsovets
Burlinsky (Бурлинский)		district		01 206	01 606		9 selsovets
Bystroistoksky (Быстроистокский)		district		01 207	01 607		8 selsovets
Volchikhinsky (Волчихинский)		district		01 208	01 608		11 selsovets
Yegoryevsky (Егорьевский)		district		01 209	01 609		8 selsovets
Yeltsovsky (Ельцовский)		district		01 210	01 610		6 selsovets
Zavyalovsky (Завьяловский)		district		01 211	01 611		12 selsovets
Zalesovsky (Залесовский)		district		01 212	01 612		9 selsovets
Zarinsky (Заринский)		district		01 213	01 613		20 selsovets
Zmeinogorsky (Змеиногорский)		district		01 214	01 614	Zmeinogorsk (Змеиногорск) town*	8 selsovets
Kalmansky (Калманский)		district		01 215	01 615		10 selsovets
Kamensky (Каменский)		district		01 216	01 616	Kamen-na-Obi (Камень-на-Оби) town*	13 selsovets
Klyuchevsky (Ключевский)		district		01 217	01 617		11 selsovets
Kosikhinsky (Косихинский)		district		01 218	01 618		11 selsovets
Krasnogorsky (Красногорский)		district		01 219	01 619		8 selsovets
Krasnoshchyokovsky (Краснощёковский)		district		01 220	01 620		14 selsovets
Krutikhinsky (Крутихинский)		district		01 221	01 621		9 selsovets
Kulundinsky (Кулундинский)		district		01 222	01 622		9 selsovets
Kuryinsky (Курьинский)		district		01 223	01 623		10 selsovets
Kytmanovsky (Кытмановский)		district		01 224	01 624		10 selsovets
Loktevsky (Локтевский)		district		01 225	01 625	Gornyak (Горняк) town*	17 selsovets
Mamontovsky (Мамонтовский)		district		01 226	01 626		13 selsovets
Mikhaylovsky (Михайловский)		district		01 227	01 627	Malinovoye Ozero (Малиновое Озеро)	7 selsovets
Novichikhinsky (Новичихинский)		district		01 228	01 628		7 selsovets
Zonalny (Зональный)		district		01 229	01 629		9 selsovets
Pavlovsky (Павловский)		district		01 230	01 630		15 selsovets
Pankrushikhinsky (Панкрушихинский)		district		01 231	01 631		9 selsovets
Pervomaysky (Первомайский)		district		01 232	01 632		18 selsovets
Petropavlovsky (Петропавловский)		district		01 233	01 633		9 selsovets
Pospelikhinsky (Поспелихинский)		district		01 234	01 634		11 selsovets
Rebrikhinsky (Ребрихинский)		district		01 235	01 635		16 selsovets
Rodinsky (Родинский)		district		01 236	01 636		12 selsovets
Romanovsky (Романовский)		district		01 237	01 637		12 selsovets
Rubtsovsky (Рубцовский)		district		01 238	01 638		17 selsovets
Smolensky (Смоленский)		district		01 240	01 640		9 selsovets
Suyetsky (Суетский)		district		01 241	01 641		5 selsovets
Sovetsky (Советский)		district		01 242	01 642		12 selsovets
Soloneshensky (Солонешенский)		district		01 243	01 643		8 selsovets
Soltonsky (Солтонский)		district		01 244	01 644		6 selsovets
Shelabolikhinsky (Шелаболихинский)		district		01 245	01 645		10 selsovets
Tabunsky (Табунский)		district		01 246	01 646		6 selsovets
Talmensky (Тальменский)		district		01 247	01 647	Talmenka (Тальменка)	17 selsovets
Togulsky (Тогульский)		district		01 248	01 648		5 selsovets
Topchikhinsky (Топчихинский)		district		01 249	01 649		17 selsovets
Tretyakovsky (Третьяковский)		district		01 250	01 650		9 selsovets
Troitsky (Троицкий)		district		01 251	01 651		11 selsovets
Tyumentsevsky (Тюменцевский)		district		01 252	01 652		14 selsovets
Uglovsky (Угловский)		district		01 253	01 653		9 selsovets
Ust-Kalmansky (Усть-Калманский)		district		01 254	01 654		9 selsovets
Ust-Pristansky (Усть-Пристанский)		district		01 255	01 655		13 selsovets
Khabarsky (Хабарский)		district		01 256	01 656		10 selsovets
Tselinny (Целинный)		district		01 257	01 657		12 selsovets
Charyshsky (Чарышский)		district		01 258	01 658		9 selsovets
Shipunovsky (Шипуновский)		district		01 259	01 659		19 selsovets
Nemetsky (Немецкий)		national district	district	01 260	01 660		12 selsovets
