= Smolensky (rural locality) =

Smolensky (Russian: Смоленский; masculine), Smolenskaya (Смоленская; feminine), or Smolenskoye (Смоленское; neuter) is the name of several rural localities in Russia:

- Smolensky, Altai Krai, a settlement in Khleborobny Selsoviet of Bystroistoksky District of Altai Krai
- Smolensky, Republic of Mordovia, a settlement in Salovsky Selsoviet of Lyambirsky District of the Republic of Mordovia
- Smolensky, Novosibirsk Oblast, a settlement in Moshkovsky District of Novosibirsk Oblast
- Smolensky, Orenburg Oblast, a settlement in Gostepriimny Selsoviet of Svetlinsky District of Orenburg Oblast
- Smolensky, Tula Oblast, a settlement in Arkhangelsky Rural Okrug of Kamensky District of Tula Oblast
- Smolenskoye, Altai Krai, a selo in Smolensky Selsoviet of Smolensky District of Altai Krai
- Smolenskoye, Oryol Oblast, a village in Starogolsky Selsoviet of Novoderevenkovsky District of Oryol Oblast
- Smolenskoye, Yaroslavl Oblast, a selo in Smolensky Rural Okrug of Pereslavsky District of Yaroslavl Oblast
- Smolenskaya (rural locality), a stanitsa in Smolensky Rural Okrug of Seversky District of Krasnodar Krai
