= Priobskoye, Altai Krai =

Priobskoye Приобское
- Village
- Location within Altai Krai Location within Russia
- Coordinates: 52°20′N 84°27′E
- Country: Russia
- Region: Altai Krai
- District: Bystroistoksky District
- Time zone: UTC+7:00

Priobskoye (Russian: Приобское) is a rural locality (a selo) and the administrative center of Priobsky Selsoviet of Bystroistoksky District, Altai Krai, Russia. The population was 782 as of 2016. There are 11 streets.

== Geography ==
Priobskoye is located south from the Ob River, 7 km southeast of Bystry Istok (the district's administrative centre) by road. Bystry Istok is the nearest rural locality.

== Ethnicity ==
The village is inhabited by Russians and others.
