= Starotyryshkino =

Starotyryshkino Старотырышкино
- Selo
- Location within Altai Krai Location within Russia
- Coordinates: 52°21′N 84°49′E
- Country: Russia
- Region: Altai Krai
- District: Smolensky District
- Time zone: UTC+7:00

Starotyryshkino (Russian: Старотырышкино) is a rural locality (a selo) in Anuysky Selsoviet, Smolensky District, Altai Krai, Russia. The population was 247 as of 2013. There are 8 streets.

== Geography ==
Starotyryshkino is located 23 km northwest of Smolenskoye (the district's administrative centre) by road. Ust-Anuy is the nearest rural locality.
