= Verkh-Anuyskoye =

Verkh-Anuyskoye Верх-Ануйское
- Selo
- Location within Altai Krai Location within Russia
- Coordinates: 52°12′N 84°35′E
- Country: Russia
- Region: Altai Krai
- District: Bystroistoksky District
- Time zone: UTC+7:00

Verkh-Anuyskoye (Russian: Верх-Ануйское) is a rural locality (a selo) and the administrative center of Verkh-Anuysky Selsoviet, Bystroistoksky District, Altai Krai, Russia. The population was 1,148 as of 2013. There are 19 streets.

== Geography ==
Verkh-Anuyskoye is located 31 km SSE of Bystry Istok (the district's administrative centre) by road, on the Anuy River. Khleborobnoye is the nearest rural locality.
