= Solonovka, Smolensky District, Altai Krai =

Solonovka Солоновка
- Selo
- Location within Altai Krai Location within Russia
- Coordinates: 52°00′N 84°37′E
- Country: Russia
- Region: Altai Krai
- District: Smolensky District
- Time zone: UTC+7:00

Solonovka (Russian: Солоновка) is a rural locality (a selo) and the administrative center of Solonovsky Selsoviet, Smolensky District, Altai Krai, Russia. The population was 1,268 as of 2013. There are 18 streets.

== Geography ==
Solonovka is located 64 km southwest of Smolenskoye (the district's administrative centre) by road. Krasny Gorodok is the nearest rural locality.
