= Akutikha =

Akutikha Акутиха
- Selo
- Location within Altai Krai Location within Russia
- Coordinates: 52°25′N 84°27′E
- Country: Russia
- Region: Altai Krai
- District: Bystroistoksky District
- Time zone: UTC+7:00

Akutikha (Russian: Акутиха) is a rural locality (a selo) and the administrative center of Akutikhinsky Selsoviet, Bystroistoksky District, Altai Krai, Russia. The population was 1,063 as of 2013. There are 28 streets.

== Geography ==
Akutikha is located 146 km northeast of Bystry Istok (the district's administrative centre) by road. Bystry Istok is the nearest rural locality.
