= Sychevka, Altai Krai =

Sychevka Сычёвка
- Selo
- Location within Altai Krai Location within Russia
- Coordinates: 52°02′N 84°46′E
- Country: Russia
- Region: Altai Krai
- District: Smolensky District
- Time zone: UTC+7:00

Sychevka (Russian: Сычёвка) is a rural locality (a selo) and the administrative center of Sychyovsky Selsoviet, Smolensky District, Altai Krai, Russia. The population was 2,142 as of 2013. There are 28 streets.

== Geography ==
Sychevka is located on the Peschanaya River, 47 km southwest of Smolenskoye (the district's administrative centre) by road. Novotyryshkino is the nearest rural locality.
