= Chernovaya =

Chernovaya Черновая
- Selo
- Location within Altai Krai Location within Russia
- Coordinates: 51°58′N 84°45′E
- Country: Russia
- Region: Altai Krai
- District: Smolensky District
- Time zone: UTC+7:00

Chernovaya (Russian: Черновая) is a rural locality (a selo) in Sychyovsky Selsoviet, Smolensky District, Altai Krai, Russia. The population was 259 as of 2013. There are 4 streets.

== Geography ==
Chernovaya is located 58 km south of Smolenskoye (the district's administrative centre) by road. Krasny Gorodok is the nearest rural locality.
