= Pervomaysky, Bystroistoksky District, Altai Krai =

Pervomaysky Первомайский
- Settlement
- Location within Altai Krai Location within Russia
- Coordinates: 52°10′N 84°31′E
- Country: Russia
- Region: Altai Krai
- District: Bystroistoksky District
- Time zone: UTC+7:00

Pervomaysky (Russian: Первомайский) is a rural locality (a settlement) in Khleborobny Selsoviet, Bystroistoksky District, Altai Krai, Russia. The population was 37 as of 2013. There is 1 street.

== Geography ==
Pervomaysky is located on the Anuy River, 42 km south of Bystry Istok (the district's administrative centre) by road. Verkh-Anuyskoye is the nearest rural locality.
