= Krasny Vostok, Altai Krai =

Krasny Vostok Красный Восток
- Settlement
- Location within Altai Krai Location within Russia
- Coordinates: 52°11′N 84°09′E
- Country: Russia
- Region: Altai Krai
- District: Petropavlovsky District
- Time zone: UTC+7:00

Krasny Vostok (Russian: Красный Восток) is a rural locality (a settlement) in Zelenodolsky Selsoviet, Petropavlovsky District, Altai Krai, Russia. The population was 20 as of 2013. There are 2 streets.

== Geography ==
Krasny Vostok is located on the Anuy River, 15 km north of Petropavlovskoye (the district's administrative centre) by road. Nikolayevka is the nearest rural locality.
