= Neninka =

Neninka Ненинка
- Selo
- Location within Altai Krai Location within Russia
- Coordinates: 52°40′N 86°11′E
- Country: Russia
- Region: Altai Krai
- District: Soltonsky District
- Time zone: UTC+7:00

Neninka (Russian: Ненинка) is a rural locality (a selo) and the administrative center of Neninsky Selsoviet, Soltonsky District, Altai Krai, Russia. The population was 933 as of 2013. There are 14 streets.

== Geography ==
Neninka is located 31 km southwest of Solton (the district's administrative centre) by road. Karabinka is the nearest rural locality.
