= Petropavlovsky (rural locality) =

Petropavlovsky (Russian: Петропа́вловский; masculine), Petropavlovskaya (Петропа́вловская; feminine), or Petropavlovskoye (Петропа́вловское; neuter) is the name of several rural localities (villages, settlements, khutors, selos, and stanitsas) in Russia:

- Petropavlovsky, Republic of Bashkortostan, a village in Ufimsky Selsoviet of Khaybullinsky District of the Republic of Bashkortostan
- Petropavlovsky, Chelyabinsk Oblast, a settlement in Petropavlovsky Selsoviet of Verkhneuralsky District of Chelyabinsk Oblast
- Petropavlovsky, Kabardino-Balkar Republic, a khutor in Prokhladnensky District of the Kabardino-Balkar Republic
- Petropavlovsky, Novosibirsk Oblast, a settlement in Zdvinsky District of Novosibirsk Oblast
- Petropavlovsky, Bolkhovsky District, Oryol Oblast, a settlement in Odnolutsky Selsoviet of Bolkhovsky District of Oryol Oblast
- Petropavlovsky, Dmitrovsky District, Oryol Oblast, a settlement in Stolbishchensky Selsoviet of Dmitrovsky District of Oryol Oblast
- Petropavlovsky, Korsakovsky District, Oryol Oblast, a settlement in Novomikhaylovsky Selsoviet of Korsakovsky District of Oryol Oblast
- Petropavlovsky, Rostov Oblast, a khutor in Vasilyevo-Khanzhonovskoye Rural Settlement of Neklinovsky District of Rostov Oblast
- Petropavlovsky, Tambov Oblast, a settlement in Volkhonshchinsky Selsoviet of Rzhaksinsky District of Tambov Oblast
- Petropavlovsky, Udmurt Republic, a village in Muvazhinsky Selsoviet of Alnashsky District of the Udmurt Republic
- Petropavlovskoye, Altai Krai, a selo in Petropavlovsky Selsoviet of Petropavlovsky District of Altai Krai
- Petropavlovskoye, Irkutsk Oblast, a selo in Kirensky District of Irkutsk Oblast
- Petropavlovskoye, Kaliningrad Oblast, a settlement in Alexeyevsky Rural Okrug of Krasnoznamensky District of Kaliningrad Oblast
- Petropavlovskoye, Kostroma Oblast, a selo in Petropavlovskoye Settlement of Pavinsky District of Kostroma Oblast
- Petropavlovskoye, Kurgan Oblast, a selo in Petropavlovsky Selsoviet of Kataysky District of Kurgan Oblast
- Petropavlovskoye, Moscow Oblast, a village in Dorokhovskoye Rural Settlement of Ruzsky District of Moscow Oblast
- Petropavlovskoye, Sakhalin Oblast, a selo in Anivsky District of Sakhalin Oblast
- Petropavlovskoye, Stavropol Krai, a selo in Arzgirsky District of Stavropol Krai
- Petropavlovskoye, Tula Oblast, a selo in Kukuysky Rural Okrug of Venyovsky District of Tula Oblast
- Petropavlovskoye, Tver Oblast, a village in Bezhetsky District of Tver Oblast
- Petropavlovskoye, Yaroslavl Oblast, a selo in Borovskoy Rural Okrug of Nekrasovsky District of Yaroslavl Oblast
- Petropavlovskaya, Arkhangelsk Oblast, a village in Puchuzhsky Selsoviet of Verkhnetoyemsky District of Arkhangelsk Oblast
- Petropavlovskaya, Chechen Republic, a stanitsa in Petropavlovskaya Rural Administration of Groznensky District of the Chechen Republic
- Petropavlovskaya, Krasnodar Krai, a stanitsa in Petropavlovsky Rural Okrug of Kurganinsky District of Krasnodar Krai
