= Khleborobnoye =

Khleborobnoye Хлеборобное
- Selo
- Location within Altai Krai Location within Russia
- Coordinates: 52°12′N 84°37′E
- Country: Russia
- Region: Altai Krai
- District: Bystroistoksky District
- Time zone: UTC+7:00

Khleborobnoye (Russian: Хлеборобное) is a rural locality (a selo) and the administrative center of Khleborobny Selsoviet, Bystroistoksky District, Altai Krai, Russia. The population was 797 as of 2013. There are 11 streets.

== Geography ==
Khleborobnoye is located on the Anuy River, 35 km southeast of Bystry Istok (the district's administrative centre) by road. Smolensky is the nearest rural locality.
