= Novopokrovka, Altai Krai =

Novopokrovka Новопокровка
- Village
- Location within Altai Krai Location within Russia
- Coordinates: 52°13′N 84°26′E
- Country: Russia
- Region: Altai Krai
- District: Bystroistoksky District
- Time zone: UTC+7:00

Novopokrovka (Russian: Новопокровка) is a rural locality (a selo) and the administrative center of Novopokrovsky Selsoviet of Bystroistoksky District, Altai Krai, Russia. The population was 928 as of 2016. There are nine streets.

== Geography ==
Novopokrovka is located on the left bank of the Anuy River, 22 km south of Bystry Istok (the district's administrative centre) by road. Verkh-Anuyskoye is the nearest rural locality.

== Ethnicity ==
The village is inhabited by Russians and others.
