= Borovlyanka, Troitsky District, Altai Krai =

Borovlyanka Боровлянка
- Selo
- Location within Altai Krai Location within Russia
- Coordinates: 52°37′N 84°26′E
- Country: Russia
- Region: Altai Krai
- District: Troitsky District
- Time zone: UTC+7:00

Borovlyanka (Russian: Боровлянка) is a rural locality (a selo) and the administrative center of Borovlyansky Selsoviet, Troitsky District, Altai Krai, Russia. The population was 1,532 as of 2013. It was founded in 1846. There are 26 streets.

== Geography ==
Borovlyanka is located 68 km southwest of Troitskoye (the district's administrative centre) by road. Mnogoozyorny is the nearest rural locality.
