= Novaya Chemrovka =

Novaya Chemrovka Новая Чемровка
- Village
- Location within Altai Krai Location within Russia
- Coordinates: 52°36′N 85°02′E
- Country: Russia
- Region: Altai Krai
- District: Zonalny District
- Time zone: UTC+7:00

Novaya Chemrovka (Russian: Новая Чемровка) is a rural locality (a selo) and the administrative center of Novochemrovsky Selsoviet of Zonalny District, Altai Krai, Russia. The population was 2079 as of 2016. There are 28 streets.

== Geography ==
Novaya Chemrovka is located on the bank of the Chemrovka River, 17 km southeast of Zonalnoye (the district's administrative centre) by road. Mirny is the nearest rural locality.

== Ethnicity ==
The village is inhabited by Russians and others.
