= Safonovka, Altai Krai =

Safonovka Сафоновка
- Settlement
- Location within Altai Krai Location within Russia
- Coordinates: 52°32′N 85°01′E
- Country: Russia
- Region: Altai Krai
- District: Zonalny District
- Time zone: UTC+7:00

Safonovka (Russian: Сафоновка) is a rural locality (a settlement) in Chemrovsky Selsoviet, Zonalny District, Altai Krai, Russia. The population was 403 as of 2013. There are 5 streets.

== Geography ==
Safonovka is located 18 km southeast of Zonalnoye (the district's administrative centre) by road. Mirny is the nearest rural locality.
