= Novosmolenka =

Novosmolenka Новосмоленка
- Selo
- Location within Altai Krai Location within Russia
- Coordinates: 52°14′N 84°43′E
- Country: Russia
- Region: Altai Krai
- District: Bystroistoksky District
- Time zone: UTC+7:00

Novosmolenka (Russian: Новосмоленка) is a rural locality (a selo) in Verkh-Anuysky Selsoviet, Bystroistoksky District, Altai Krai, Russia. The population was 18 as of 2013. There is 1 street.

== Geography ==
Novosmolenka is located on the Anuy River, 42 km southeast of Bystry Istok (the district's administrative centre) by road. Smolensky is the nearest rural locality.
