= Smolensky =

Smolensky is a Russian adjective referring to the city or region of Smolensk. It is also used as a surname, originally meaning someone from, or connected to, the city or the region of Smolensk. It has the (transliterated) Russian forms Smolensky (masculine), Smolenskaya (feminine), or Smolenskoye (neuter). It may refer to:

- Smolensky (surname)
- Smolensky District, name of several districts in Russia
- Smolensky (rural locality) (Smolenskaya, Smolenskoye), name of several rural localities in Russia
- Smolensky Metro Bridge, a bridge in Moscow, Russia
- Smolensky Bridge, a bridge in Saint Petersburg, Russia
- Smolensk Oblast (Smolenskaya oblast), a federal subject of Russia
- Smolenskaya (Arbatsko-Pokrovskaya line), a station on the Arbatsko-Pokrovskaya line of the Moscow Metro
- Smolenskaya (Filyovskaya line), a station on the Filyovskaya line of the Moscow Metro
- Smolenskaya Mountain

== See also ==
- Smolenski
