= Petropavlovsky =

Petropavlovsky (masculine), Petropavlovskaya (feminine), or Petropavlovskoye (neuter) may refer to:

- Petropavlovsky District, name of several districts in Russia
- Petropavlovsky (crater), a lunar crater
- Peter and Paul Fortress (Petropavlovskaya krepost), a fortress in St. Petersburg, Russia
- Petropavlovsky (rural locality) (Petropavlovskaya, Petropavlovskoye), name of several rural localities in Russia
- Petropavlovskoye, former name of Sabirabad, a city in Azerbaijan
