= Daniil Bessarabov =

Russian politician (born 1976)

- Даниил Бессарабов
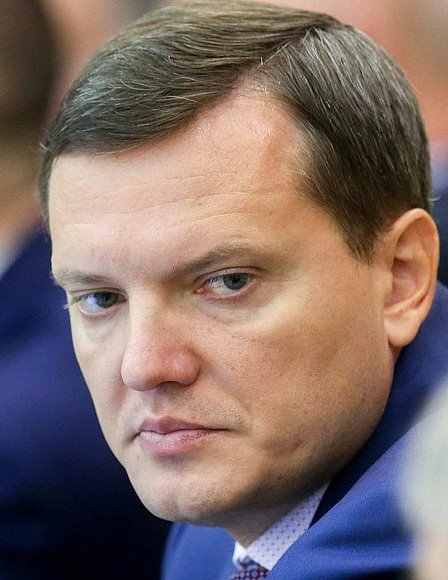
- Bessarabov in 2018

Deputy of the State Duma for Altai Krai
- Incumbent
- Assumed office 5 October 2016
- Preceded by: Constituency Re-established
- Constituency: Barnaul (No. 39)

Personal details
- Born: 9 July 1976 (age 50) Novokuznetsk, Kemerovo Oblast, Russian SFSR, USSR
- Party: United Russia
- Children: 3
- Education: Altai State University; RANEPA

Daniil Vladimirovich Bessarabov (Russian: Даниил Владимирович Бессарабов; born 9 July 1976) is a Russian political figure and deputy of the 7th and 8th State Duma convocations.

In 1999, Bessarabov graduated from the Altai State University. In 2006, he was awarded a Doctor of Juridical Science degree. From 1999 to 2004, he worked as a lawyer in Barnaul. In 2004, he was elected a deputy of the Altai Regional Council of People's Deputies, running from the Liberal Democratic Party of Russia. Later he joined the United Russia. On September 17, 2010, he was appointed the Deputy Governor of the Altai Territory. Since 2016, he has served as deputy of the 7th (2016–2021) and 8th State Duma (2021–) convocations.

Daniil Bessarabov is married and has two daughters.

== Legislative activity ==
From 2016 to 2020, he served as a deputy of the State Duma of the VII convocation, co-authored 17 legislative initiatives and amendments to draft federal laws.

== Sanctions ==
He was sanctioned by the UK government in 2022 in relation to the Russo-Ukrainian War.
