= Petropavlovsky District =

One of two districts in Russia

Location of Altai Krai in Russia

Location of Voronezh Oblast in Russia

Petropavlovsky District is the name of several administrative and municipal districts in Russia:

- Petropavlovsky District, Altai Krai, an administrative and municipal district of Altai Krai
- Petropavlovsky District, Voronezh Oblast, an administrative and municipal district of Voronezh Oblast

== See also ==
- Petropavlovsky (disambiguation)
