= Smolensky, Altai Krai =

Smolensky Смоленский
- Settlement
- Location within Altai Krai Location within Russia
- Coordinates: 52°12′N 84°40′E
- Country: Russia
- Region: Altai Krai
- District: Bystroistoksky District
- Time zone: UTC+7:00

Smolensky (Russian: Смоленский) is a rural locality (a settlement) in Khleborobny Selsoviet, Bystroistoksky District, Altai Krai, Russia. The population was 351 as of 2013. There are 4 streets.

== Geography ==
Smolensky is located on the Anuy River, 37 km southeast of Bystry Istok (the district's administrative centre) by road. Khleborobnoye is the nearest rural locality.
