= Smolensky District =

Location of Altai Krai in Russia

Location of Smolensk Oblast in Russia

Smolensky District is the name of several administrative and municipal districts in Russia:

- Smolensky District, Altai Krai, an administrative and municipal district of Altai Krai
- Smolensky District, Smolensk Oblast, an administrative and municipal district of Smolensk Oblast

== See also ==
- Smolensky (disambiguation)
