= Maria Prusakova (politician) =

Russian Communist politician

- Мария Прусакова
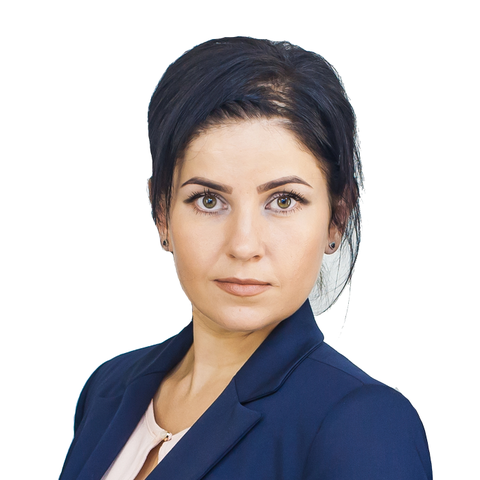
- Prusakova in 2021

Member of the State Duma for Altai Krai
- Incumbent
- Assumed office 12 October 2021
- Preceded by: Viktor Zobnev
- Constituency: Rubtsovsk (No. 40)

Personal details
- Born: 4 September 1983 (age 42) Barnaul, Russian SFSR, USSR
- Party: Communist Party of the Russian Federation
- Education: Altai State University
- Occupation: Social Worker

Maria Nikolayevna Prusakova (Russian: Мария Николаевна Прусакова; born 4 September 1983) is a Russian politician, who serves as a member of the State Duma since 2021.

== Biography ==
A member of the Communist Party, she was elected to represent the Rubtsovsk constituency in the 2021 Russian legislative election, becoming one of the few people to have defeated a candidate of the ruling United Russia party in constituency seats.

In her capacity as a member of parliament, she was placed on the sanctions list of the United Kingdom in relation to the 2022 Russian invasion of Ukraine.

Prusakova was considered as a possible candidate for her party in the 2024 Russian presidential election.

== Electoral history ==
2021 Russian legislative election in the Rubtsovsk constituency
Candidate	Party	Votes	%
Maria Prusakova	Communist Party	51,177	27.12%
Sergey Struchenko	United Russia	41,814	22.16%
Lyudmila Suslova	A Just Russia — For Truth	16,689	8.84%
Yelena Kurnosova	Communists of Russia	14,683	7.78%
Irina Shudra	Liberal Democratic Party	14,593	7.73%
Vladislav Vakayev	New People	14,565	7.72%
Viktor Dvornikov	Party of Pensioners	9,580	5.08%
Yevgeny Astakhovsky	Rodina	7,024	3.72%
Andrey Krylov	Yabloko	5,921	3.13%
Pavel Chesnov	Russian Party of Freedom and Justice	2,585	1.37%
Total		188,733	100%
