= Troitskoye, Troitsky District, Altai Krai =

Troitskoye Троицкое
- Village
- Location within Altai Krai Location within Russia
- Coordinates: 52°58′N 84°40′E
- Country: Russia
- Region: Altai Krai
- District: Troitsky District
- Time zone: UTC+7:00

Troitskoye (Russian: Троицкое) is a rural locality (a selo) one of the fifty-nine in Altai Krai, Russia. It is located in the eastern central part of the krai and the administrative center of Troitsky District, Altai Krai, Russia. The population was 9,634 in 2016. There are 86 streets.

== Geography ==
The village is located 97 km south-east from Barnaul on the Bolhsaya Rechka River.
