= Solton =

Rural locality in Altai Krai, Russia

Coordinates: 52°51′N 86°29′E

Solton (Russian: Солтон) is a rural locality (a selo) and the administrative center of Soltonsky District of Altai Krai, Russia. Population: 2,770 (2010 census); 3,141 (2002 census); 3,449 (1989 Soviet census).
