= Yuzhny, Barnaul, Altai Krai =

Yuzhny Южный
- Settlement
- Location within Altai Krai Location within Russia
- Coordinates: 53°15′N 83°41′E
- Country: Russia
- Region: Altai Krai
- District: Barnaul urban okrug
- Time zone: UTC+7:00

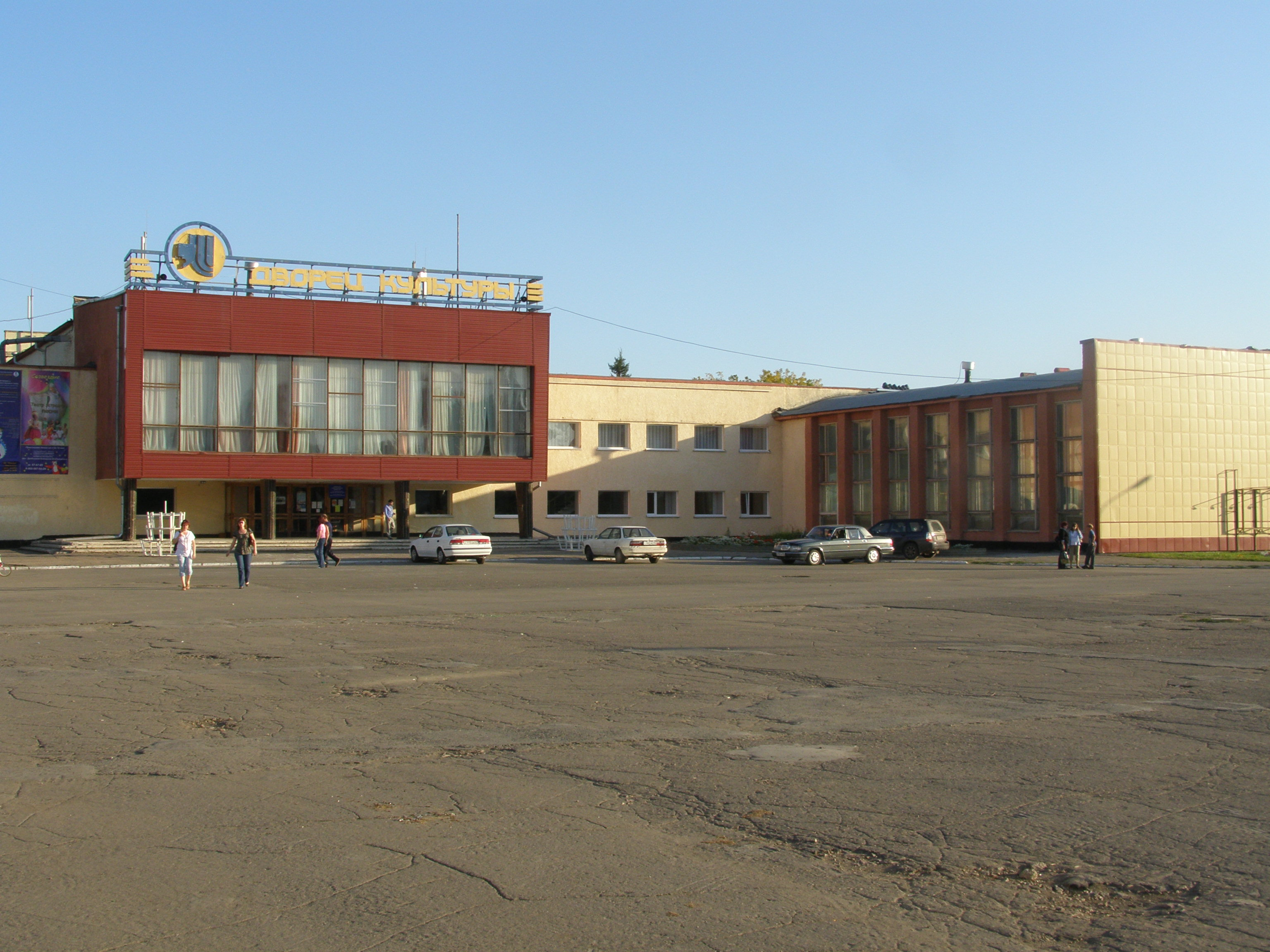

Yuzhny (Russian: Южный) is an urban-type settlement in Barnaul urban okrug, Altai Krai, Russia. The population was 19,799 as of 2016.

== Geography ==
Yuzhny is located 15 km south of Barnaul (the district's administrative centre) by road. Ponomarevka is the nearest rural locality.
