= Petropavlovsky, Republic of Bashkortostan =

Petropavlovsky Петропавловский
- Village
- Location within Bashkortostan Location within Russia
- Coordinates: 52°10′N 58°03′E
- Country: Russia
- Region: Bashkortostan
- District: Khaybullinsky District
- Time zone: UTC+5:00

Petropavlovsky (Russian: Петропавловский) is a rural locality (a village) in Ufimsky Selsoviet, Khaybullinsky District, Bashkortostan, Russia. The population was 232 as of 2010. There are 4 streets.

== Geography ==
Petropavlovsky is located 46 km north of Akyar (the district's administrative centre) by road. Verkhnesalimovo is the nearest rural locality.
