= Nikolai Gerasimenko =

Russian surgeon and politician

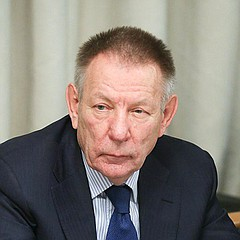
- Born: 1 December 1950 (age 75); Verkh-Suyetka, Altai Krai, Soviet Union
- Occupations: Surgeon and politician
- Known for

Member of the State Duma
- In office 17 December 1995 – 19 September 2021
- Parliamentary group: Regions of Russia (1995–99); People's Deputy (1999–2007); United Russia (2007–21)

Nikolai Fyodorovich Gerasimenko (Russian: Никола́й Фёдорович Герасиме́нко) is a Russian surgeon and politician.

== Early years ==
He was born on 1 December 1950, in Verkh-Suyetka, in the former Soviet Union to a family of municipal employee and school teacher.

== Education and medical career ==
He studied at Altai State Medical University (graduated in 1973) and later worked for I.M. Sechenov First Moscow State Medical University. As a surgeon he performed about 10,000 operations.

In 1986 he received the degree of Candidate of Medical Sciences, and in 1992 a professor's degree.

Gerasimenko served as the chief surgeon of Altai Krai in 1985-1990, overseeing surgical services in the region. In 1990-1995 he led the regional health committee, managing healthcare policies and institutions.

He is an Honored Doctor of the Russian Federation, Academician of the Russian Academy of Medical Sciences (2002), member of the Presidium of the Russian Academy of Medical Sciences, and a member of the council of the all-Russian public organization "League of the Health of the Nation".

In 2013 Gerasimenko became an Academician of the Russian Academy of Sciences.

== Political career ==
He was a member of the 2nd, 3rd, 4th, 5th, 6th, and 7th State Dumas between 1995–2021, and the Chair of State Duma Healthcare and Sports committee between 1995–2003.

He is the author and co-author of 95 laws (including the Dima Yakovlev Law), 36 of which concern healthcare.

He is the principal author of the law "On Restriction of Tobacco Smoking."

He serves as Chairman of the Expert Council on Tobacco Control under the State Duma Committee on Health Protection. In the 7th convocation of the State Duma, he was a member of the Health Protection Committee.

On 13 April 2018, he became one of the initiators of draft law No. 441399-7 "On Measures of Influence (Counteraction) Against Unfriendly Actions of the United States of America and/or Other Foreign States," Article 2, Clause 15 of which proposed a ban or restriction on the import of medicines produced in the U.S. or other foreign countries into the Russian Federation. The bill was criticized by a number of public organizations, the Federation Council Committee on Social Policy[8], and the State Duma Committee on International Affairs.

In 2019, the State Duma lifted his parliamentary immunity due to a road accident at Leninsky Avenue, Moscow. Gerasimenko was found guilty of a traffic violation in which a motorcyclist was injured, and his driver's licence was revoked.

== Awards and honours ==
- Order of Honour (2000)
- Order "For Merit to the Fatherland", IV degree (2011)
- Medal of the Order "For Merit to the Fatherland", II degree (2006)
