= Altai State University =

University in Barnaul, Russia

- Алтайский государственный университет
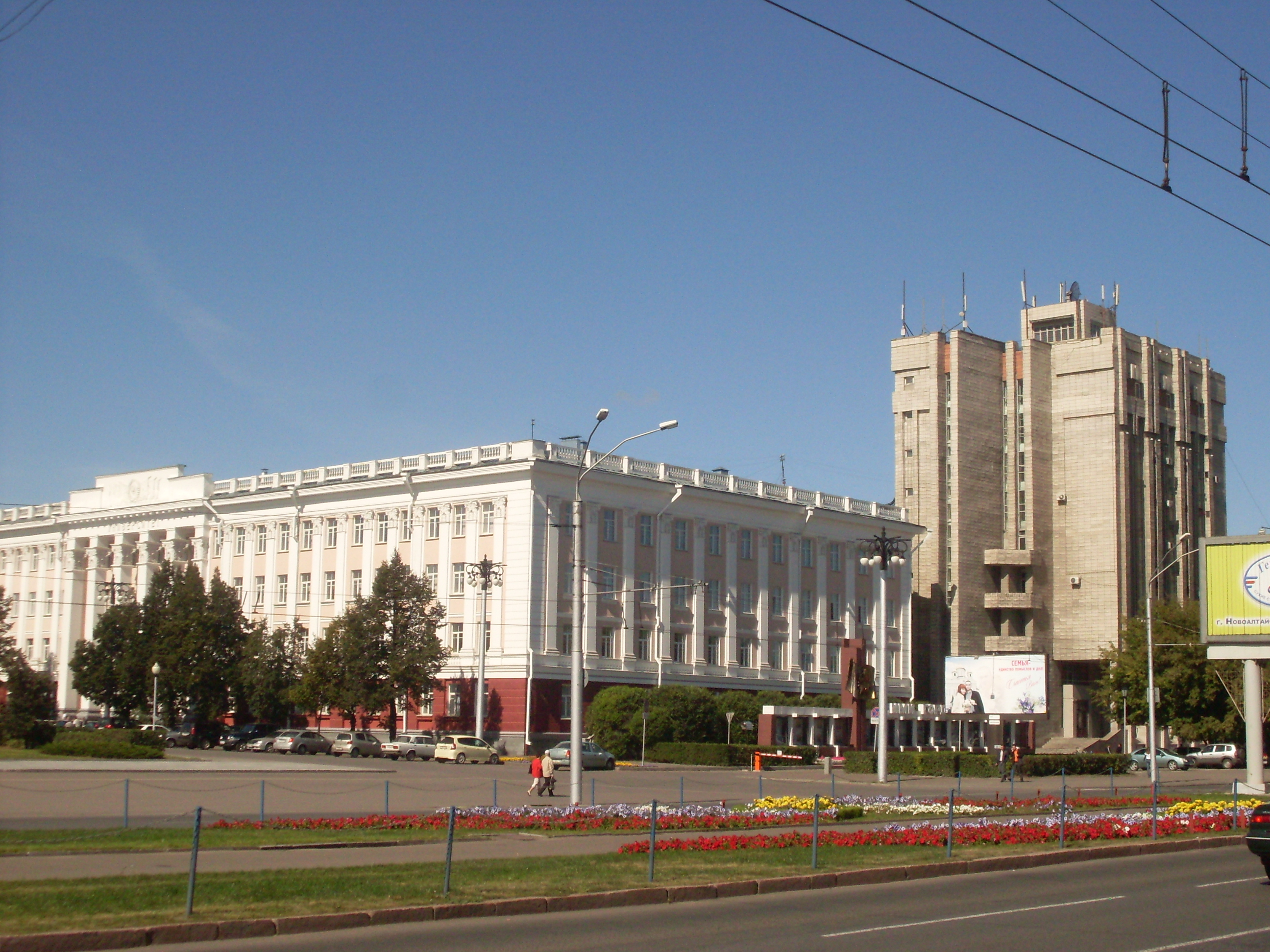
- Other name: AltGU (АлтГУ)
- Motto: Your future starts here! (Russian: Ваше будущее начинается здесь!)
- Type: Public
- Established: 1973
- Rector: Prof. Bocharov Sergey Nikolaevich
- Location: Barnaul, Russia; 53°20′51″N 83°46′34″E
- Campus: Urban
- Website: http://www.asu.ru/

Altai State University (Russian: Алтайский государственный университет is a public research university in Barnaul, Russia. It was established as the first multidisciplinary university in Altai Krai in 1973.

== History ==
The opening of the university was preceded by a great deal of work carried out by the Altai Regional Party Committee. The First Secretary of the Regional Committee of the CPSU Alexander Vasilyevich Georgiev in his memo "On the Organization of the Altai State University" to the Soviet Ministry of Higher Education on December 6, 1972, substantiated the need to open a new higher education institution with multidisciplinary training in the Altai Krai: the region was in dire need of highly qualified specialists.

In 1972, the Regional Committee of the CPSU and the Regional Executive Committee addressed the General Secretary of the CPSU Central Committee L. I. Brezhnev with a reasoned letter about opening a university in Altai. On December 27, 1972, the Secretariat of the CPSU Central Committee reviewed it and recognized the establishment of the Altai University as fully justified and timely. On December 31, 1972, the Bureau of the Regional Committee and the Regional Executive Committee adopted a resolution "On the Organization of the Altai State University", which defined practical measures for the creation of the university. On March 27, 1973, the Council of Ministers of the Soviet Union adopted Resolution No. 179 on the opening of a university in Barnaul. On May 25, 1973, the corresponding Resolution No. 279 was adopted by the Council of Ministers of the RSFSR. In pursuance of the adopted decisions, the ministers of higher and secondary specialized education of the USSR and the RSFSR issued orders No. 274 and 229 on the organization of Altai State University. In September 1973, the educational process began at Altai State University.

By order of the Ministry of Higher Education of the RSFSR No. 253 of May 29, 1973, the initial structure of the university was designated. In accordance with it, the university was to have five faculties: history and philology, law, economics, chemistry and biology, physics and mathematics. Training was provided in 9 specialties: history, philology, jurisprudence, labor economics, industrial production planning and organization, chemistry, biology, physics, mathematics, and economic cybernetics. The opening of these specialties was supposed to be gradual. In 1973, the training of historians, philologists, lawyers, and economists began. The following year, chemists, biologists, mathematicians, and physicists. Later, the structure of the university underwent some changes.

In 1973, the law and history-philology departments began to function, which had not yet been approved by the Ministry of Higher Education of the RSFSR (the order for their organization was issued on January 2, 1974). On May 29, on the recommendation of the regional committee of the CPSU, the Minister of Higher and Secondary Specialized Education of the RSFSR appointed candidate of historical sciences, associate professor Vasily Ivanovich Neverov as rector of the Altai State University.

== Departments ==
Altai State University has the following departments: Arts, Biology, Chemistry, Geography, History, Law, Mathematics and IT, Mass Communication, Philology and Political Science, Physics and Technology, Education and Psychology, Sociology and International Institute of Economics, Management and Informational Systems.

The university has affiliates in Biysk, Belokurikha, Rubtsovsk and Slavgorod all in Altai Krai.

== Rankings ==
University rankings

Global – Overall
- QS World: 851-900

Regional – Overall
- QS BRICS: 94
- QS Emerging Europe and Central Asia: 121 (2022)
