= Oktyabrsky City District, Barnaul =

Coordinates: 53°22′N 83°48′E

Oktyabrsky City District (Russian: Октябрьский райо́н) is a district of the city of Barnaul, Altai Krai, Russia. Its area is ca. 69.4 square kilometers (26.8 sq mi). Population: 98,483 (2010 Census); 121,804 (1989 Soviet census).
