= Zonalnoye, Altai Krai =

Zonalnoye Зональное
- Selo
- Interactive map of Zonalnoye
- Location of Zonalnoye Zonalnoye (Altai Krai)
- Coordinates: 52°39′55″N 84°56′05″E
- Country: Russia
- Federal subject: Altai Krai
- Administrative district: Zonalny District
- SelsovietSelsoviet: Zonalny Selsoviet
- Founded: 1932

Population (2010 Census)
  - Total: 3,402
  - Estimate (2021): 3,013 (−11.4%)

Administrative status
  - Capital of: Zonalny District, Zonalny Selsoviet

Municipal status
  - Municipal district: Zonalny Municipal District
  - Rural settlement: Zonalny Selsoviet Rural Settlement
  - Capital of: Zonalny Municipal District, Zonalny Selsoviet Rural Settlement
- Time zone: UTC+7 (MSK+4)
- Postal code: 659400
- OKTMO ID: 01629426101

Zonalnoye (Russian: Зональное) is a rural locality (a selo) and the administrative center of Zonalny District of Altai Krai, Russia. Population: 3,402 (2010 census); 3,528 (2002 census); 3,380 (1989 Soviet census).
