= Zheleznodorozhny City District, Barnaul =

Settlement in Altai Krai, Russia

Coordinates: 53°21′N 83°46′E

Zheleznodorozhny City District (Russian: Железнодорожный райо́н) is a district of the city of Barnaul, Altai Krai, Russia. Its area is c. 15.5 square kilometers (6.0 sq mi). Population: 113,970 (2010 Census); 131,306 (1989 Soviet census).
