= Petropavlovskoye, Altai Krai =

Rural locality in Petropavlovsky, Russia

Coordinates: 52.070°N 84.107°E

Petropavlovskoye (Russian: Петропавловское) is a rural locality (a selo) and the administrative center of Petropavlovsky District of Altai Krai, Russia. Population: 2,642 (2010 census); 2,919 (2002 census); 3,129 (1989 Soviet census).
