= Leninsky City District, Barnaul =

Coordinates: 53°21′N 83°41′E

Leninsky City District (Russian: Ленинский райо́н) is a district of the city of Barnaul, Altai Krai, Russia. Its area is ca. 110 square kilometers (42 sq mi). Population: 141,179 (2010 Census); 185,653 (1989 Soviet census).
