= Industrialny City District, Barnaul =

Coordinates: 53°20′N 83°40′E

Industrialny City District (Russian: Индустриальный райо́н) is a district of the city of Barnaul, Altai Krai, Russia. Its area is ca. 129.9 square kilometers (50.2 sq mi). Population: 167,324 (2010 census); 76,206 (1989 Soviet census).
