= Soltonsky District =

Soltonsky District Солтонский район (Russian)
- District
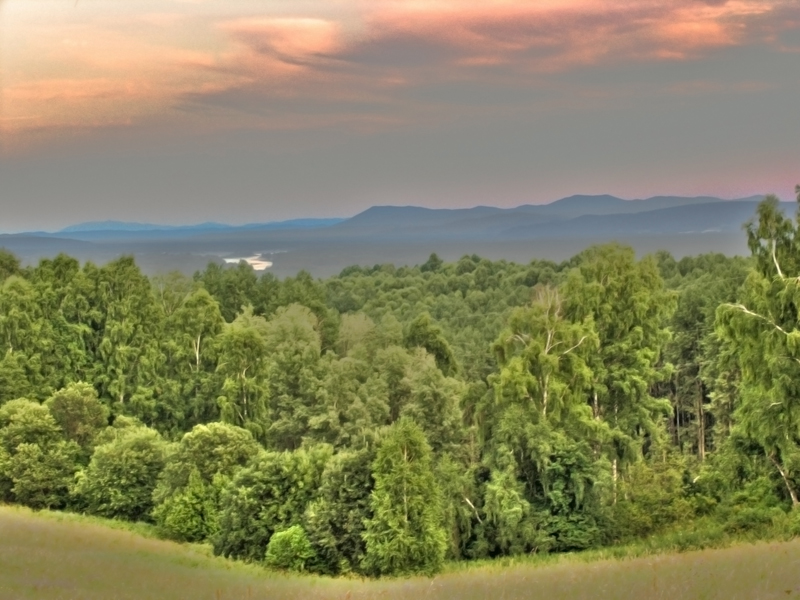
- Landscape in Soltonsky District

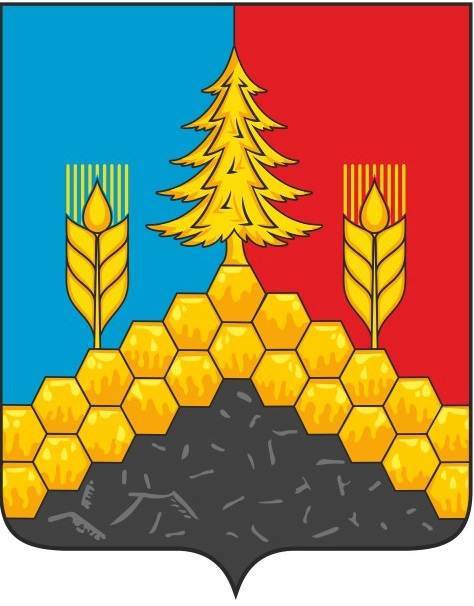
- Coat of arms
- Location of Soltonsky District in Altai Krai
- Coordinates: 52°50′N 86°28′E
- Country: Russia
- Federal subject: Altai Krai
- Established: 1924
- Administrative center: Solton

Area
  - Total: 3,020 km^{2} (1,170 sq mi)

Population (2010 Census)
  - Total: 8,610
  - Density: 2.85/km^{2} (7.38/sq mi)
  - Urban: 0%
  - Rural: 100%

Administrative structure
  - Administrative divisions: 6 selsoviet
  - Inhabited localities: 23 rural localities

Municipal structure
  - Municipally incorporated as: Soltonsky Municipal District
  - Municipal divisions: 0 urban settlements, 6 rural settlements
- Time zone: UTC+7 (MSK+4)
- OKTMO ID: 01644000
- Website: http://soltonadm.ru/

Soltonsky District (Russian: Солто́нский райо́н) is an administrative and municipal district (raion), one of the fifty-nine in Altai Krai, Russia. It is located in the east of the krai. The area of the district is 3,020 square kilometers (1,170 sq mi). Its administrative center is the rural locality (a selo) of Solton. Population: 8,610 (2010 census); 10,954 (2002 census); 11,891 (1989 Soviet census). The population of Solton accounts for 32.2% of the district's total population.
