= Belokurikha =

Spa town in the Altai region of Russia

Belokurikha Белокуриха
- Town
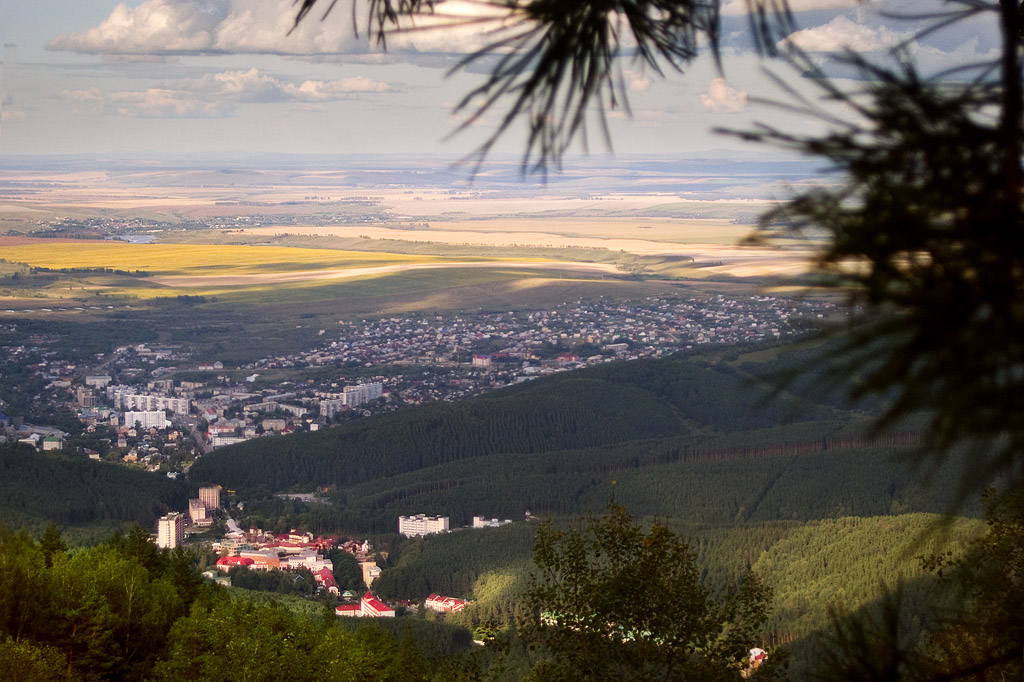
- View of the town, 2010

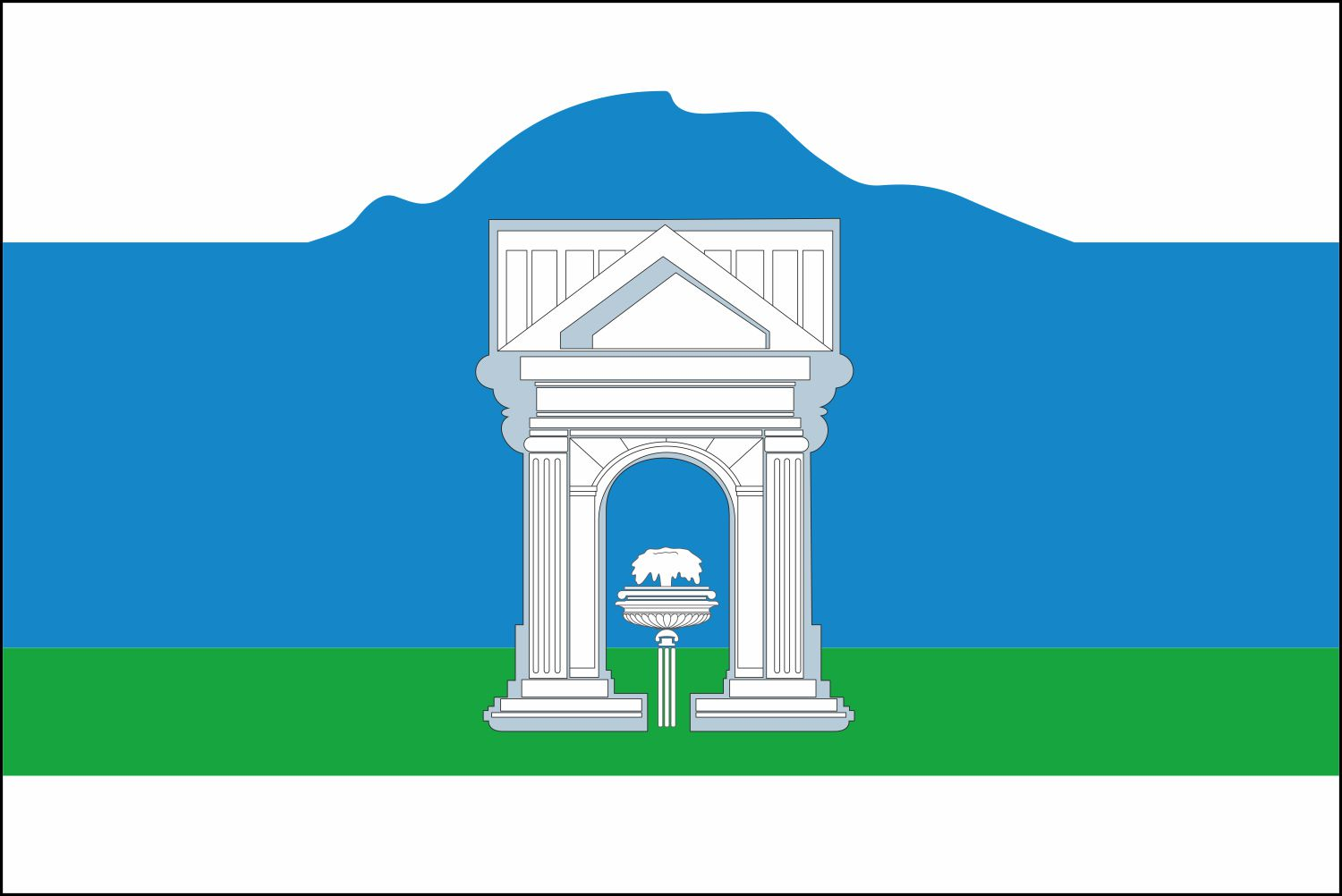
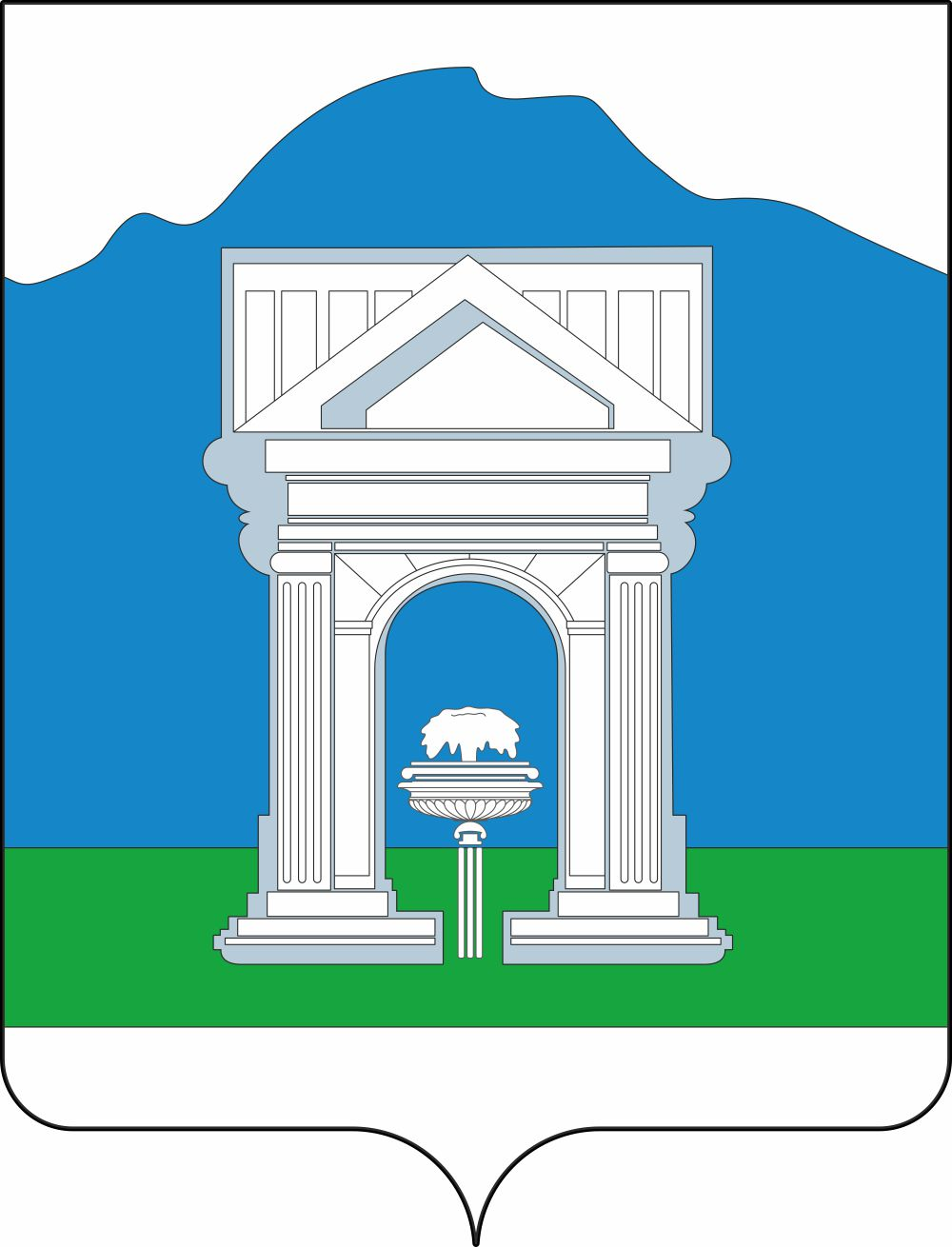
- Flag Coat of arms
- Interactive map of Belokurikha
- Location of Belokurikha Belokurikha (Altai Krai)
- Coordinates: 51°59′N 84°59′E
- Country: Russia
- Federal subject: Altai Krai
- Founded: 1803
- Town status since: 1982
- Elevation: 250 m (820 ft)

Population (2010 Census)
  - Total: 14,661
  - Estimate (2025): 14,873 (+1.4%)

Administrative status
  - Subordinated to: town of krai significance of Belokurikha
  - Capital of: town of krai significance of Belokurikha

Municipal status
  - Urban okrug: Belokurikha Urban Okrug
  - Capital of: Belokurikha Urban Okrug
- Time zone: UTC+7 (MSK+4)
- Postal codes: 659900, 659901
- Dialing code: +7 38577
- OKTMO ID: 01704000001
- Website: belokuriha-gorod.ru

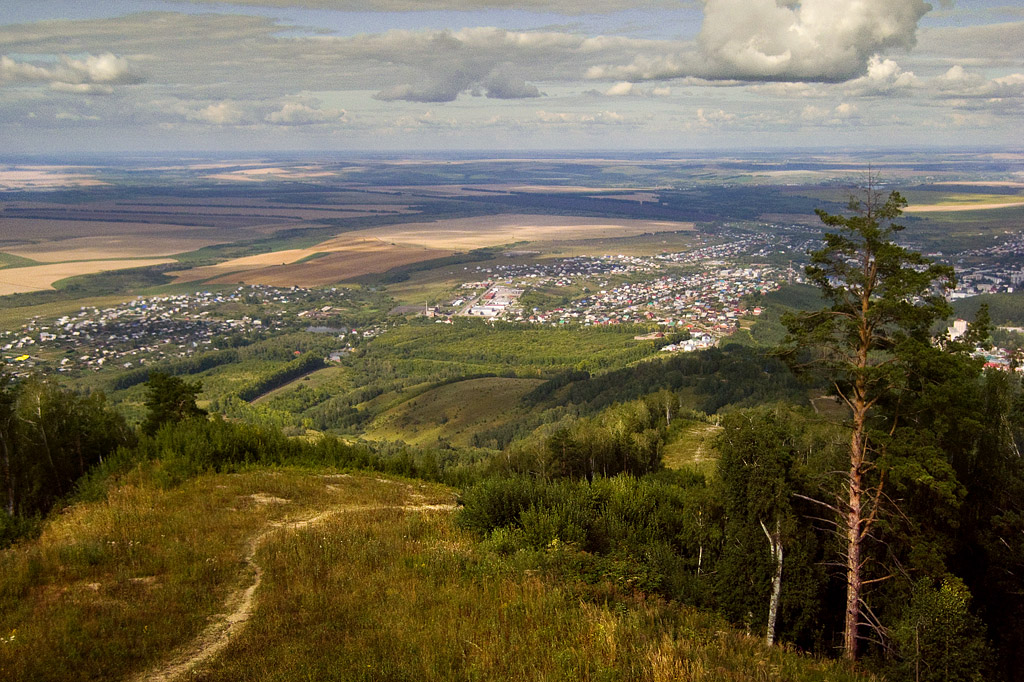
Belokurikha. The view of the city from the mountains Church

Belokurikha (Russian: Белоку́риха) is a town and a balneological resort in the Altai region of Russia, located on the Belokurikha River 250 kilometers (160 mi) south of Barnaul, the administrative center of the krai. As of the 2010 Census, its population was 14,661.

== Administrative and municipal status ==
Within the framework of administrative divisions, it is incorporated as a city of federal subject significance — an administrative unit of status equivalent to that of a district. As a municipal division, the town of Belokurikha is incorporated as "Belokurikha Urban Okrug".

== Physical and geographical characteristics ==
=== Geographical location ===
Located in the South-Eastern part of Altai Krai in the valley of the river Belokurikha, at an altitude of 240–250 meters above sea level at the foot of the mountain Churches. It is located in the foothills of Altai, on the site of thermal radon waters.

=== Climate ===
The climate is characterized by high average annual air temperature for Siberia and mainly windless weather, the absence of large changes in atmospheric pressure. Precipitation up to 800 mm, mainly in summer. The average July temperature is +18 °C...+20 °C. summer months are characterized by low atmospheric pressure (about 733 mm Hg). art.), compared with the winter and spring months (743...748 mm Hg. V.). Snow cover is set in November. Average temperature in winter: -15,9 °C, sometimes there are more severe frosts.

=== Flora ===
The southern part of the resort town is bordered by spurs of the Cherginsky ridge, which is covered with coniferous vegetation and shrubs: Rowan, cherry, maral. In the vicinity of the city are widespread acclimatized plants, such as oak and Manchurian nut.

== History ==
In the 1920s, on the site of the village Novobelokurikha was founded resort village. In 1942, the all-Union pioneer camp "Artek" was evacuated to Belokurikha. In the 1960s were built most of the resorts in which are now treated and relax resort guests. In 1970, the village received the status of a resort of all-Union importance, in 1982-the status of the city, and since 1992 is a resort of Federal importance.

The President of Russia Vladimir Putin visited Belokurikha in 2003 and 2016.

== Transport ==
Nearest cities: Biysk (65 km), Gorno-Altaysk (115 km), Barnaul (236 km). The city is connected by bus with Barnaul, Biysk, Gorno-Altaisk, Kemerovo, Novokuznetsk, Mezhdurechensk, Novosibirsk and Tomsk. The nearest airport is Gorno-Altaysk airport and Biysk train station.

== Population ==
As of January 1, 2018, the city was on the 786th place out of 1113 cities of the Russian Federation in terms of population.

== Spa ==
Currently, the resort area of Belokurikha is able to accept at the same time more than 5 thousand tourists. There are 19 sanatorium-resort and sanatorium-health-improving establishments on 5000 places in the city.

=== Medical factor ===
==== Climatotherapy ====
It is characterized by a relatively high average annual air temperature (+ 4 °C) in Siberia.

==== Mountain air ====
Light air ions is the main treatment component of the mountain air. In Belokurikha, the content of light aeroions is from 1014 to 2400.

==== Thermal water ====
Belokurikhinskoe sources are the thermal nitric-siliceous radonotherapy water or nitrogen baths. They come to the surface with a temperature of 30 °C and 42 °C.

==== Ski mountaineering ====
At the beginning of 2010, the resort was equipped with three main ski slopes: "Katun" - the Central slope of the resort with a length of 800 meters, "North" with a length of 650 meters and" Church " with a length of 2050 meters.

=== "Siberian Davos" ===
At present, Belokurikha is known not only as a balneological resort, but also as a venue for major events.

=== Research Institute of balneology ===
In February 2016, the Altai research Institute of balneology was established in Belokurikha . The institution plans to study the natural healing factors of the region and develop on their basis methods and methods of treatment, as well as to draw up programs for the development of the sanatorium complex of the region, the resorts "Belokurikha" and "Belokurikha-2".

=== Belokurikha-2 ===
Construction of tourist and recreational cluster "Belokurikha-2" is located 10 kilometers from the town of Belokurikha. It will include a developed medical base tourist infrastructure, interesting layout, as well as seven ski slopes.

In 2017, it was planned to prepare engineering infrastructure: to put into operation a power line, to carry out a gas pipeline and water supply, as well as a Sewerage system. Historical-architectural complex "St. Andrew's village" runs from 2017.

== Mass media ==
=== Radios ===
101.1 MHz "Police wave" + local broadcasting " Katun FM»;

104 MHz "radio — Belokurikha" (exclusively local broadcasting);

104,4 MHz NRJ;

106.9 MHz "Road radio»;

107.4 MHz "Radio of Russia" + local broadcasting of GTRK " Altai»;

=== TV ===
5 MV of the "First channel»;

6 MV "Russia-1" + local broadcasting of GTRK "Altai»;

22 DMV the First multiplex of digital television of Russia;

28 DMV "TV Center" + " TNT»;

33 DMV Second multiplex of digital television of Russia;

35 MSK "NTV»;

39 DMV " Fifth channel»;

45 MSK "Match TV»;

50 DMV " Katun 24»;
