= Troitsky District, Altai Krai =

Troitsky District Троицкий район (Russian)
- District
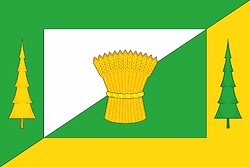
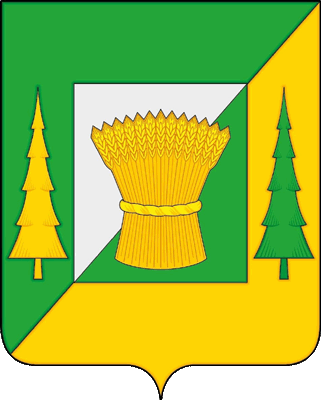
- Flag Coat of arms
- Location of Troitsky District in Altai Krai
- Coordinates: 52°59′10″N 84°39′22″E
- Country: Russia
- Federal subject: Altai Krai
- Established: 27 May 1924
- Administrative center: Troitskoye

Area
  - Total: 4,200 km^{2} (1,600 sq mi)

Population (2010 Census)
  - Total: 24,868
  - Density: 5.9/km^{2} (15/sq mi)
  - Urban: 0%
  - Rural: 100%

Administrative structure
  - Administrative divisions: 11 selsoviet
  - Inhabited localities: 38 rural localities

Municipal structure
  - Municipally incorporated as: Troitsky Municipal District
  - Municipal divisions: 0 urban settlements, 11 rural settlements
- Time zone: UTC+7 (MSK+4)
- OKTMO ID: 01651000
- Website: http://www.troalt.ru/

Troitsky District (Russian: Тро́ицкий райо́н) is an administrative and municipal district (raion), one of the fifty-nine in Altai Krai, Russia. It is located in the eastern central part of the krai. The area of the district is 4,200 square kilometers (1,600 sq mi). Its administrative center is the rural locality (a selo) of Troitskoye. Population: 24,868 (2010 census); 30,538 (2002 census); 34,383 (1989 Soviet census). The population of Troitskoye accounts for 40.4% of the district's total population.
