= Zonalny District =

Zonalny District Зональный район (Russian)
- District
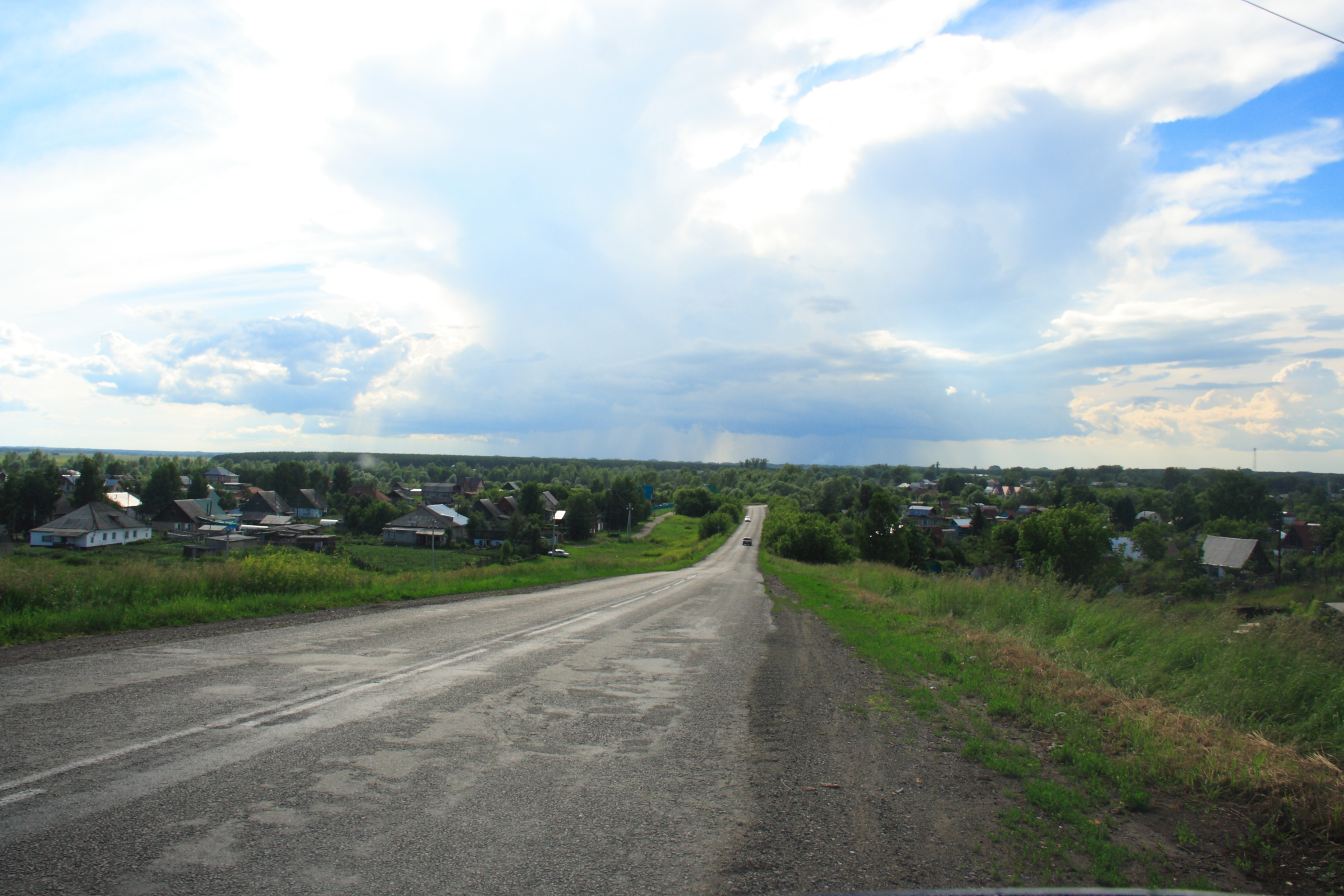
- Landscape in Zonalny District
- Location of Zonalny District in Altai Krai
- Coordinates: 52°42′N 85°00′E
- Country: Russia
- Federal subject: Altai Krai
- Established: 29 January 1938
- Administrative center: Zonalnoye

Area
  - Total: 1,717 km^{2} (663 sq mi)

Population (2010 Census)
  - Total: 19,676
  - Density: 11.46/km^{2} (29.68/sq mi)
  - Urban: 0%
  - Rural: 100%

Administrative structure
  - Administrative divisions: 9 selsoviet
  - Inhabited localities: 22 rural localities

Municipal structure
  - Municipally incorporated as: Zonalny Municipal District
  - Municipal divisions: 0 urban settlements, 9 rural settlements
- Time zone: UTC+7 (MSK+4)
- OKTMO ID: 01629000
- Website: www.altairegion22.ru

Zonalny District (Russian: Зона́льный райо́н) is an administrative and municipal district (raion), one of the fifty-nine in Altai Krai, Russia. It is located in the east of the krai. The area of the district is 1,717 square kilometers (663 sq mi). Its administrative center is the rural locality (a selo) of Zonalnoye. Population: 19,676 (2010 census); 20,571 (2002 census); 20,982 (1989 Soviet census). The population of Zonalnoye accounts for 17.3% of the district's total population.
