= Smolenskoye, Altai Krai =

Rural locality in Altai Krai, Russia

Coordinates: 52.305°N 85.079°E

Smolenskoye (Russian: Смоленское) is a rural locality (a selo) and the administrative center of Smolensky District of Altai Krai, Russia. Population: 8,985 (2010 census); 9,671 (2002 census); 9,475 (1989 Soviet census).
