= Petropavlovsky District, Altai Krai =

Petropavlovsky District Петропавловский район (Russian)
- District
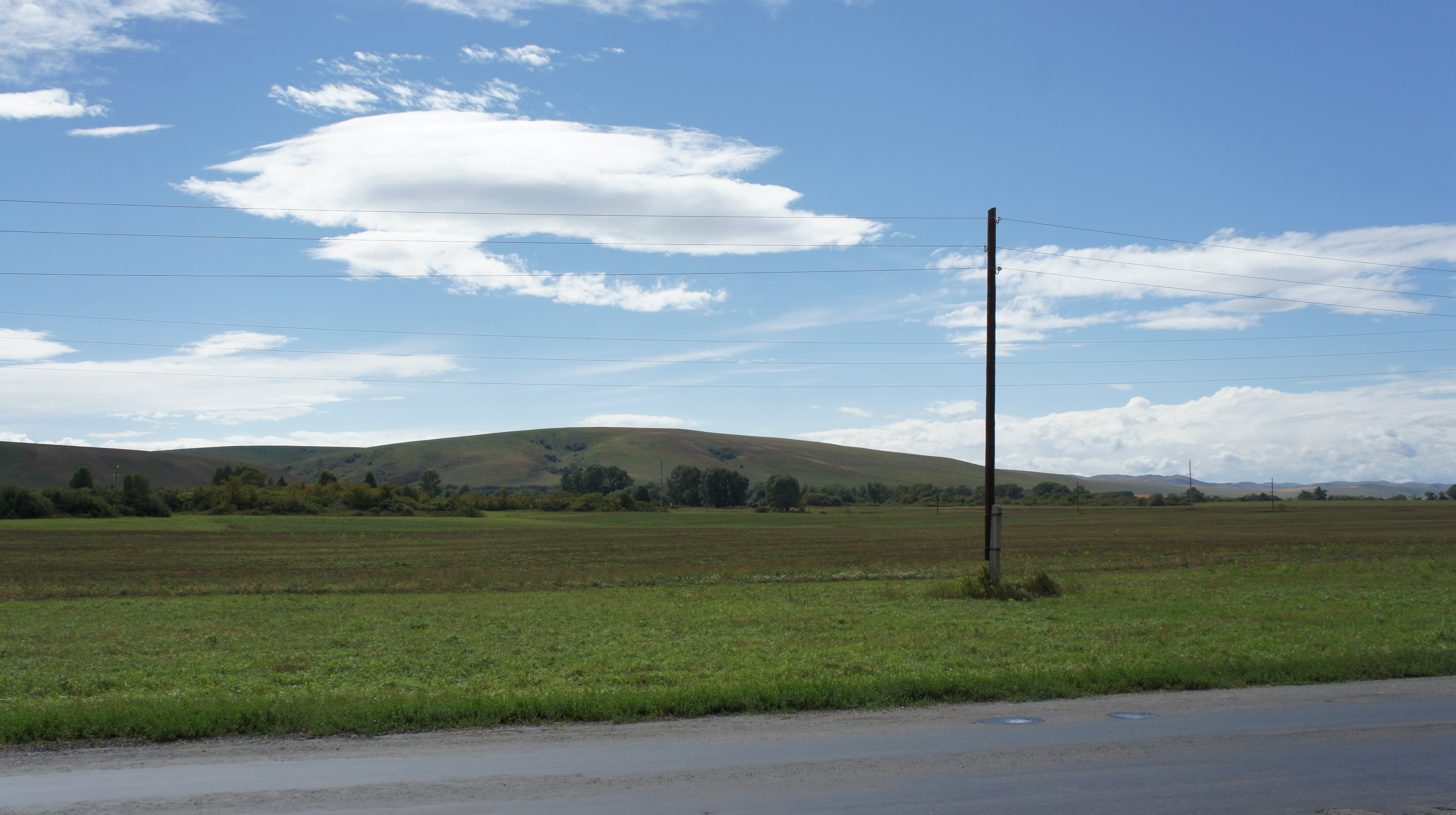
- A landscape in Petropavlovsky District

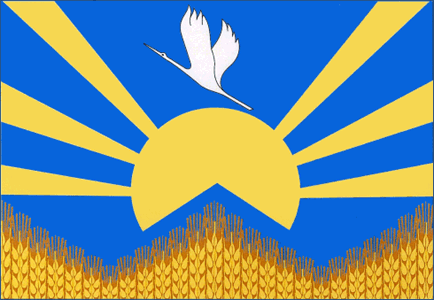
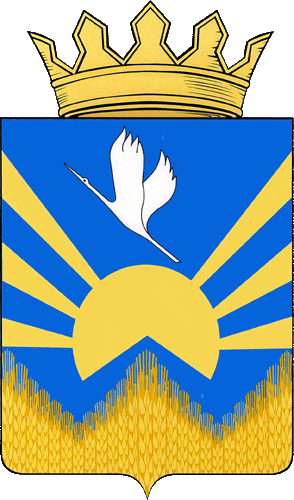
- Flag Coat of arms
- Location of Petropavlovsky District in Altai Krai
- Coordinates: 52°04′N 84°07′E
- Country: Russia
- Federal subject: Altai Krai
- Established: 1944
- Administrative center: Petropavlovskoye

Area
  - Total: 1,618 km^{2} (625 sq mi)

Population (2010 Census)
  - Total: 12,450
  - Density: 7.695/km^{2} (19.93/sq mi)
  - Urban: 0%
  - Rural: 100%

Administrative structure
  - Administrative divisions: 7 selsoviet
  - Inhabited localities: 9 rural localities

Municipal structure
  - Municipally incorporated as: Petropavlovsky Municipal District
  - Municipal divisions: 0 urban settlements, 9 rural settlements
- Time zone: UTC+7 (MSK+4)
- OKTMO ID: 01633000
- Website: www.altairegion22.ru

Petropavlovsky District (Russian: Петропа́вловский райо́н) is an administrative and municipal district (raion), one of the fifty-nine in Altai Krai, Russia. It is located in the southeastern central part of the krai. The area of the district is 1,618 square kilometers (625 sq mi). Its administrative center is the rural locality (a selo) of Petropavlovskoye. Population: 12,450 (2010 census); 13,911 (2002 census); 14,418 (1989 Soviet census). The population of Petropavlovskoye accounts for 21.2% of the district's total population.
