= Bystroistoksky District =

Bystroistoksky District Быстроистокский район (Russian)
- District
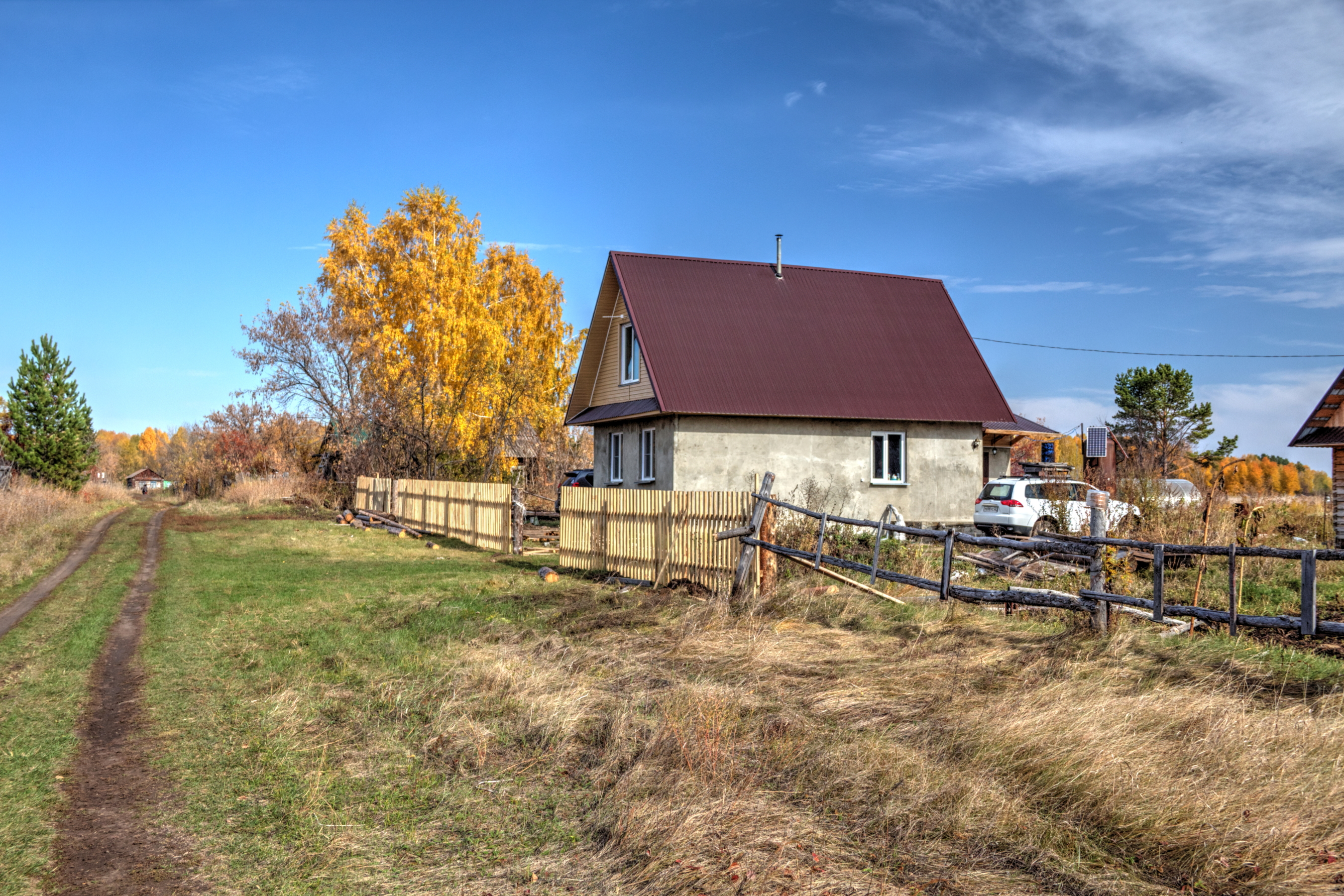
- Autumn in Bystroistoksky District
- Location of Bystroistoksky District in Altai Krai
- Coordinates: 52°22′N 84°24′E
- Country: Russia
- Federal subject: Altai Krai
- Administrative center: Bystry Istok

Area
  - Total: 1,924 km^{2} (743 sq mi)

Population (2010 Census)
  - Total: 10,150
  - Density: 5.275/km^{2} (13.66/sq mi)
  - Urban: 0%
  - Rural: 100%

Administrative structure
  - Administrative divisions: 8 selsoviet
  - Inhabited localities: 12 rural localities

Municipal structure
  - Municipally incorporated as: Bystroistoksky Municipal District
  - Municipal divisions: 0 urban settlements, 8 rural settlements
- Time zone: UTC+7 (MSK+4)
- OKTMO ID: 01607000
- Website: http://admbi.ru/

Bystroistoksky District (Russian: Быстроисто́кский райо́н) is an administrative and municipal district (raion), one of the fifty-nine in Altai Krai, Russia. It is located in the eastern central part of the krai. The area of the district is 1,924 square kilometers (743 sq mi). Its administrative center is the rural locality (a selo) of Bystry Istok. Population: 10,150 (2010 census); 12,484 (2002 census); 13,618 (1989 Soviet census). The population of Bystry Istok accounts for 38.0% of the district's total population.

== Geography ==
Bystroistoksky District is located in the southeast of Altai Krai, on rolling plain leading into foothills of the Altai Mountains to the east. The Ob River flows from east to west across the northern part of the district. The area north of the Ob is forested, while south of the river is steppe terrain and agricultural fields. Bystroistoksky District is 25 km west of the city of Biysk, and 3,000 km east of Moscow. The area measures 55 km (north-south), and 45 km (west-east); total area is 1,804 km2 (about 2% of Altai Krai). The administrative center is the town of Bystry Istok, on the banks of the Ob.

The soils are chernozem (black), and the forests mostly conifer and mixed forest. About one-third of the district is forested.

The district is bordered on the north by Zonalny District, on the east by Smolensky District, on the south by Petropavlovsky District, and on the west by Troitsky District.

== History ==
The first small settlement of European Russians occurred in 1749 with the founding of the village of Bystry Istok, on the high left bank of the Ob River. A census in the early 1800s showed 38 households in the village. A few villages developed around a peasant agricultural economy, with many of the settlers being retired soldiers who received land allotments. A glassworks was founded in the village of Akutiha in 1911, and virgin agricultural land was open in the 1950s.
