= Bystry Istok =

Bystry Istok Быстрый Исток
- Selo
- Interactive map of Bystry Istok
- Location of Bystry Istok Bystry Istok (Altai Krai)
- Coordinates: 52°22′22″N 84°23′01″E
- Country: Russia
- Federal subject: Altai Krai
- Administrative district: Bystroistoksky District
- SelsovietSelsoviet: Bystroistoksky Selsoviet

Population (2010 Census)
  - Total: 3,852
  - Estimate (2021): 3,159 (−18%)

Administrative status
  - Capital of: Bystroistoksky District, Bystroistoksky Selsoviet

Municipal status
  - Municipal district: Bystroistoksky Municipal District
  - Rural settlement: Bystroistoksky Selsoviet Rural Settlement
  - Capital of: Bystroistoksky Municipal District, Bystroistoksky Selsoviet Rural Settlement
- Time zone: UTC+7 (MSK+4)
- Postal code: 659560
- OKTMO ID: 01607405101

Bystry Istok (Russian: Быстрый Исток) is a rural locality (a selo) and the administrative center of Bystroistoksky District of Altai Krai, Russia. Population: 3,852 (2010 census); 4,490 (2002 census); 6,211 (1989 Soviet census).
