= Smolensky District, Altai Krai =

Smolensky District Смоленский район (Russian)
- District
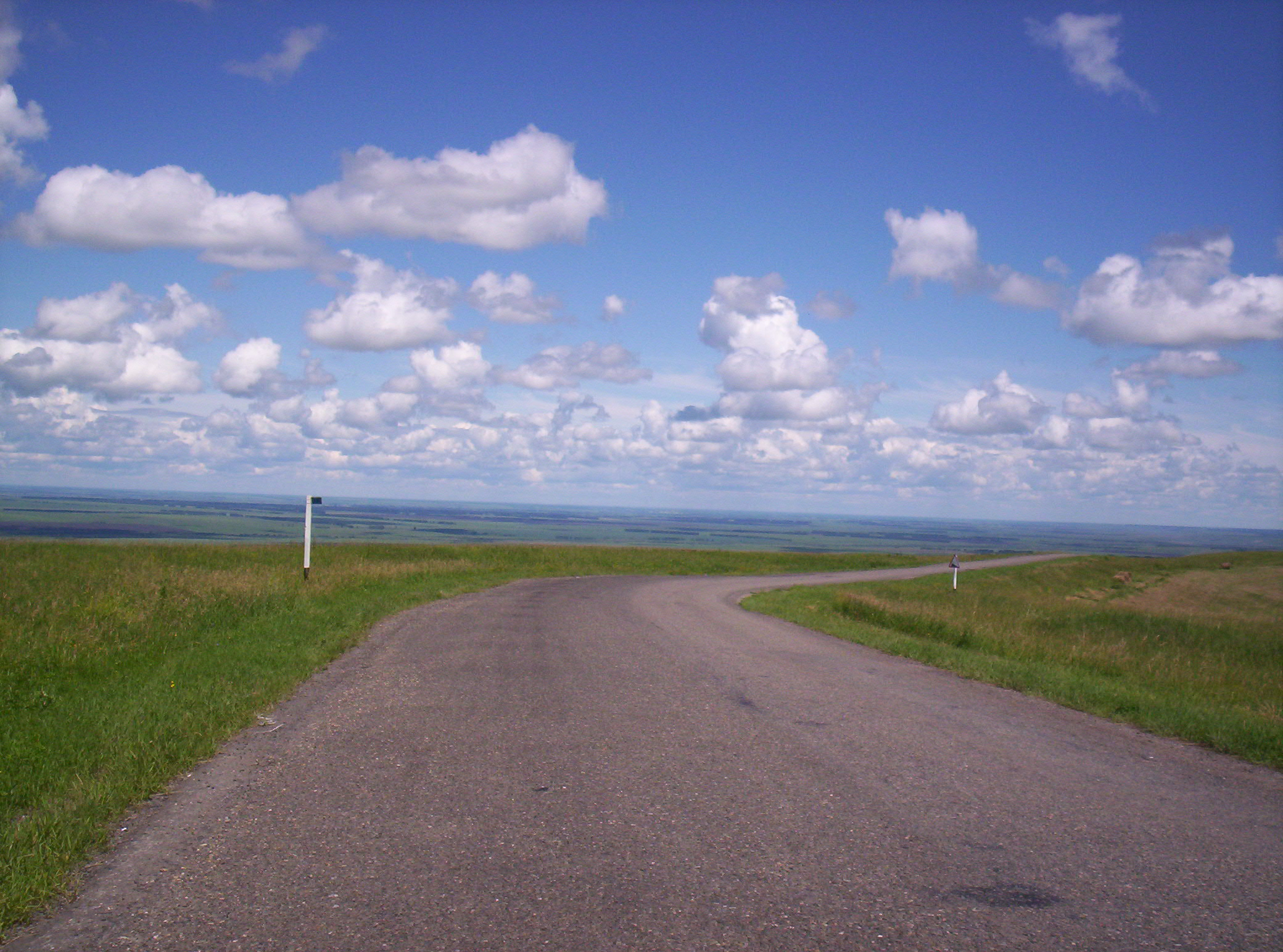
- A landscape in Smolensky District
- Location of Smolensky District in Altai Krai
- Coordinates: 52°18′N 85°05′E
- Country: Russia
- Federal subject: Altai Krai
- Established: 27 May 1924
- Administrative center: Smolenskoye

Area
  - Total: 2,033 km^{2} (785 sq mi)

Population (2010 Census)
  - Total: 23,955
  - Density: 11.78/km^{2} (30.52/sq mi)
  - Urban: 0%
  - Rural: 100%

Administrative structure
  - Administrative divisions: 9 selsoviet
  - Inhabited localities: 31 rural localities

Municipal structure
  - Municipally incorporated as: Smolensky Municipal District
  - Municipal divisions: 0 urban settlements, 9 rural settlements
- Time zone: UTC+7 (MSK+4)
- OKTMO ID: 01640000
- Website: http://www.xn----8sbnmfccgimgcjzff.xn--p1ai/

Smolensky District (Russian: Смоле́нский райо́н) is an administrative and municipal district (raion), one of the fifty-nine in Altai Krai, Russia. It is located in the southeast of the krai. The area of the district is 2,033 square kilometers (785 sq mi). Its administrative center is the rural locality (a selo) of Smolenskoye. Population: 23,955 (2010 census); 26,033 (2002 census); 40,590 (1989 Soviet census). The population of Smolenskoye accounts for 37.5% of the district's total population.
