= Panfilovo =

Panfilovo (Russian: Панфилово) is the name of several rural localities in Russia.

== Modern localities ==
- Panfilovo, Altai Krai, a selo in Novoromanovsky Selsoviet of Kalmansky District in Altai Krai; 53°9′N 83°20′E
- Panfilovo (selo), Ivanovo Oblast, a selo in Savinsky District of Ivanovo Oblast
- Panfilovo (village), Ivanovo Oblast, a village in Savinsky District of Ivanovo Oblast
- Panfilovo, Kaliningrad Oblast, a settlement under the administrative jurisdiction of the urban-type settlement of district significance of Zheleznodorozhny in Pravdinsky District of Kaliningrad Oblast
- Panfilovo, Kemerovo Oblast, a selo in Chusovitinskaya Rural Territory of Leninsk-Kuznetsky District in Kemerovo Oblast; 54°57′N 86°23′E
- Panfilovo, Galichsky District, Kostroma Oblast, a village in Loparevskoye Settlement of Galichsky District in Kostroma Oblast; 58°20′N 42°41′E
- Panfilovo, Susaninsky District, Kostroma Oblast, a village in Sokirinskoye Settlement of Susaninsky District in Kostroma Oblast; 58°10′N 41°40′E
- Panfilovo, Nizhny Novgorod Oblast, a selo in Shatovsky Selsoviet of Arzamassky District in Nizhny Novgorod Oblast; 55°17′N 43°40′E
- Panfilovo, Velizhsky District, Smolensk Oblast, a village in Budnitskoye Rural Settlement of Velizhsky District in Smolensk Oblast
- Panfilovo, Vyazemsky District, Smolensk Oblast, a village in Yushkovskoye Rural Settlement of Vyazemsky District in Smolensk Oblast
- Panfilovo, Gus-Khrustalny, Vladimir Oblast, a settlement under the administrative jurisdiction of the Town of Gus-Khrustalny in Vladimir Oblast
- Panfilovo, Muromsky District, Vladimir Oblast, a selo in Muromsky District of Vladimir Oblast
- Panfilovo, Petushinsky District, Vladimir Oblast, a village in Petushinsky District of Vladimir Oblast
- Panfilovo, Sudogodsky District, Vladimir Oblast, a village in Sudogodsky District of Vladimir Oblast
- Panfilovo, Volgograd Oblast, a settlement in Panfilovsky Selsoviet of Novoanninsky District in Volgograd Oblast
- Panfilovo, Gryazovetsky District, Vologda Oblast, a village in Minkinsky Selsoviet of Gryazovetsky District in Vologda Oblast
- Panfilovo, Sheksninsky District, Vologda Oblast, a village in Yurochensky Selsoviet of Sheksninsky District in Vologda Oblast
- Panfilovo, Kirillovsky Rural Okrug, Lyubimsky District, Yaroslavl Oblast, a village in Kirillovsky Rural Okrug of Lyubimsky District in Yaroslavl Oblast
- Panfilovo, Yermakovsky Rural Okrug, Lyubimsky District, Yaroslavl Oblast, a village in Yermakovsky Rural Okrug of Lyubimsky District in Yaroslavl Oblast
- Panfilovo, Poshekhonsky District, Yaroslavl Oblast, a village in Pogorelsky Rural Okrug of Poshekhonsky District in Yaroslavl Oblast
- Panfilovo, Rybinsky District, Yaroslavl Oblast, a selo in Oktyabrsky Rural Okrug of Rybinsky District in Yaroslavl Oblast
- Panfilovo, Tutayevsky District, Yaroslavl Oblast, a village in Fominsky Rural Okrug of Tutayevsky District in Yaroslavl Oblast

== Alternative names ==
- Panfilovo, alternative name of Bolshoye Panfilovo, a village in Gorevsky Selsoviet of Urensky District in Nizhny Novgorod Oblast; 57°32′N 45°52′E
