= Martynovsky (rural locality) =

Set index of articles associated with the same name

Martynovsky (Russian: Мартыновский; masculine), Martynovskaya (Мартыновская; feminine), or Martynovskoye (Мартыновское; neuter) is the name of several rural localities in Russia:

- Martynovsky, Oryol Oblast, a settlement in Gostomlsky Selsoviet of Kromskoy District of Oryol Oblast
- Martynovsky, Volgograd Oblast, a khutor in Deminsky Selsoviet of Novoanninsky District of Volgograd Oblast
- Martynovskoye, Moscow Oblast, a selo in Aksinyinskoye Rural Settlement of Stupinsky District of Moscow Oblast
- Martynovskoye, Vologda Oblast, a village in Kharovsky Selsoviet of Kharovsky District of Vologda Oblast
- Martynovskaya, Arkhangelsk Oblast, a village in Voyezersky Selsoviet of Nyandomsky District of Arkhangelsk Oblast
- Martynovskaya, Moscow Oblast, a village in Savvinskoye Rural Settlement of Yegoryevsky District of Moscow Oblast
- Martynovskaya, Nyuksensky District, Vologda Oblast, a village in Uftyugsky Selsoviet of Nyuksensky District of Vologda Oblast
- Martynovskaya, Totemsky District, Vologda Oblast, a village in Zaozersky Selsoviet of Totemsky District of Vologda Oblast
- Martynovskaya, Verkhovazhsky District, Vologda Oblast, a village in Klimushinsky Selsoviet of Verkhovazhsky District of Vologda Oblast
