= Shilovo =

Shilovo (Russian: Шилово) is the name of several inhabited localities in Russia.

== Modern localities ==
=== Altai Krai ===
As of 2010, one rural locality in Altai Krai bears this name:

- Shilovo, Altai Krai, a selo in Shilovsky Selsoviet of Kalmansky District

=== Arkhangelsk Oblast ===
As of 2010, one rural locality in Arkhangelsk Oblast bears this name:

- Shilovo, Arkhangelsk Oblast, a village under the administrative jurisdiction of Privodino Urban-Type Settlement with Jurisdictional Territory, Kotlassky District

=== Ivanovo Oblast ===
As of 2010, two rural localities in Ivanovo Oblast bear this name:

- Shilovo, Kineshemsky District, Ivanovo Oblast, a village in Kineshemsky District
- Shilovo, Privolzhsky District, Ivanovo Oblast, a village in Privolzhsky District

=== Kaliningrad Oblast ===
As of 2010, one rural locality in Kaliningrad Oblast bears this name:

- Shilovo, Kaliningrad Oblast, a settlement in Gavrilovsky Rural Okrug of Ozyorsky District

=== Kaluga Oblast ===
As of 2010, one rural locality in Kaluga Oblast bears this name:

- Shilovo, Kaluga Oblast, a village in Borovsky District

=== Kostroma Oblast ===
As of 2010, one rural locality in Kostroma Oblast bears this name:

- Shilovo, Kostroma Oblast, a village in Ugorskoye Settlement of Manturovsky District

=== Moscow Oblast ===
As of 2010, four rural localities in Moscow Oblast bear this name:

- Shilovo, Lotoshinsky District, Moscow Oblast, a village in Osheykinskoye Rural Settlement of Lotoshinsky District
- Shilovo, Ramensky District, Moscow Oblast, a village in Sofyinskoye Rural Settlement of Ramensky District
- Shilovo, Ruzsky District, Moscow Oblast, a village in Volkovskoye Rural Settlement of Ruzsky District
- Shilovo, Volokolamsky District, Moscow Oblast, a village in Yaropoletskoye Rural Settlement of Volokolamsky District

=== Nizhny Novgorod Oblast ===
As of 2010, one rural locality in Nizhny Novgorod Oblast bears this name:

- Shilovo, Nizhny Novgorod Oblast, a village in Khvoshchevsky Selsoviet of Bogorodsky District

=== Novgorod Oblast ===
As of 2010, two rural localities in Novgorod Oblast bear this name:

- Shilovo, Khvoyninsky District, Novgorod Oblast, a village in Borovskoye Settlement of Khvoyninsky District
- Shilovo, Valdaysky District, Novgorod Oblast, a village in Yazhelbitskoye Settlement of Valdaysky District

=== Novosibirsk Oblast ===
As of 2010, one rural locality in Novosibirsk Oblast bears this name:

- Shilovo, Novosibirsk Oblast, a selo in Novosibirsky District

=== Oryol Oblast ===
As of 2010, one rural locality in Oryol Oblast bears this name:

- Shilovo, Oryol Oblast, a village in Krutovskoy Selsoviet of Livensky District

=== Perm Krai ===
As of 2010, one rural locality in Perm Krai bears this name:

- Shilovo, Perm Krai, a village in Permsky District

=== Pskov Oblast ===
As of 2010, twelve rural localities in Pskov Oblast bear this name:

- Shilovo (Bezhanitskaya Rural Settlement), Bezhanitsky District, Pskov Oblast, a village in Bezhanitsky District; municipally, a part of Bezhanitskaya Rural Settlement of that district
- Shilovo (Dobryvichskaya Rural Settlement), Bezhanitsky District, Pskov Oblast, a village in Bezhanitsky District; municipally, a part of Dobryvichskaya Rural Settlement of that district
- Shilovo, Dedovichsky District, Pskov Oblast, a village in Dedovichsky District
- Shilovo, Krasnogorodsky District, Pskov Oblast, a village in Krasnogorodsky District
- Shilovo, Novorzhevsky District, Pskov Oblast, a village in Novorzhevsky District
- Shilovo, Ostrovsky District, Pskov Oblast, a village in Ostrovsky District
- Shilovo, Pechorsky District, Pskov Oblast, a village in Pechorsky District
- Shilovo, Porkhovsky District, Pskov Oblast, a village in Porkhovsky District
- Shilovo, Pskovsky District, Pskov Oblast, a village in Pskovsky District
- Shilovo, Pushkinogorsky District, Pskov Oblast, a village in Pushkinogorsky District
- Shilovo, Pustoshkinsky District, Pskov Oblast, a village in Pustoshkinsky District
- Shilovo, Velikoluksky District, Pskov Oblast, a village in Velikoluksky District

=== Ryazan Oblast ===
As of 2010, two inhabited localities in Ryazan Oblast bear this name.

Urban localities

- Shilovo, Shilovsky District, Ryazan Oblast, a work settlement in Shilovsky District

Rural localities

- Shilovo, Korablinsky District, Ryazan Oblast, a village in Yurakovsky Rural Okrug of Korablinsky District

=== Smolensk Oblast ===
As of 2010, four rural localities in Smolensk Oblast bear this name:

- Shilovo, Gagarinsky District, Smolensk Oblast, a village in Ashkovskoye Rural Settlement of Gagarinsky District
- Shilovo, Glinkovsky District, Smolensk Oblast, a village in Dobrominskoye Rural Settlement of Glinkovsky District
- Shilovo, Rudnyansky District, Smolensk Oblast, a village in Lyubavichskoye Rural Settlement of Rudnyansky District
- Shilovo, Ugransky District, Smolensk Oblast, a village in Kholmovskoye Rural Settlement of Ugransky District

=== Tambov Oblast ===
As of 2010, one rural locality in Tambov Oblast bears this name:

- Shilovo, Tambov Oblast, a selo in Grazhdanovsky Selsoviet of Bondarsky District

=== Tula Oblast ===
As of 2010, two rural localities in Tula Oblast bear this name:

- Shilovo, Venyovsky District, Tula Oblast, a village in Kukuysky Rural Okrug of Venyovsky District
- Shilovo, Yefremovsky District, Tula Oblast, a selo in Shilovsky Rural Okrug of Yefremovsky District

=== Tver Oblast ===
As of 2010, four rural localities in Tver Oblast bear this name:

- Shilovo, Andreapolsky District, Tver Oblast, a village in Lugovskoye Rural Settlement of Andreapolsky District
- Shilovo, Kalininsky District, Tver Oblast, a village in Verkhnevolzhskoye Rural Settlement of Kalininsky District
- Shilovo, Staritsky District, Tver Oblast, a village in Stepurinskoye Rural Settlement of Staritsky District
- Shilovo, Vyshnevolotsky District, Tver Oblast, a settlement in Kolomenskoye Rural Settlement of Vyshnevolotsky District

=== Vologda Oblast ===
As of 2010, nine rural localities in Vologda Oblast bear this name:

- Shilovo, Babayevsky District, Vologda Oblast, a village in Tsentralny Selsoviet of Babayevsky District
- Shilovo, Babushkinsky District, Vologda Oblast, a village in Kulibarovsky Selsoviet of Babushkinsky District
- Shilovo, Cherepovetsky District, Vologda Oblast, a village in Myaksinsky Selsoviet of Cherepovetsky District
- Shilovo, Gryazovetsky District, Vologda Oblast, a village in Sidorovsky Selsoviet of Gryazovetsky District
- Shilovo, Kichmengsko-Gorodetsky District, Vologda Oblast, a village in Yemelyanovsky Selsoviet of Kichmengsko-Gorodetsky District
- Shilovo, Nikolsky District, Vologda Oblast, a village in Milofanovsky Selsoviet of Nikolsky District
- Shilovo, Ust-Kubinsky District, Vologda Oblast, a village in Ustyansky Selsoviet of Ust-Kubinsky District
- Shilovo, Ustyuzhensky District, Vologda Oblast, a village in Ustyuzhensky Selsoviet of Ustyuzhensky District
- Shilovo, Vologodsky District, Vologda Oblast, a village in Borisovsky Selsoviet of Vologodsky District

=== Yaroslavl Oblast ===
As of 2010, three rural localities in Yaroslavl Oblast bear this name:

- Shilovo, Danilovsky District, Yaroslavl Oblast, a village in Pokrovsky Rural Okrug of Danilovsky District
- Shilovo, Nekrasovsky District, Yaroslavl Oblast, a village in Vyatsky Rural Okrug of Nekrasovsky District
- Shilovo, Rybinsky District, Yaroslavl Oblast, a village in Pogorelsky Rural Okrug of Rybinsky District

== Abolished localities ==
- Shilovo, Voronezh Oblast, formerly a work settlement under the administrative jurisdiction of Voronezh Urban Okrug; merged into Voronezh in January 2011
