= Vitaly Manishin =

Russian serial killer (born 1971)

- Born: Vitaly Yegorovich Manishin; 10 November 1971 (age 54); Zelyonaya Dubrava, Altai Krai, RSFSR, Soviet Union
- Other names: "The Barnaul Maniac" "The University Maniac" "The Polytechnic Maniac" "The Bloody Rector" "The Tutor"
- Conviction: Murder
- Penalty: 25 years imprisonment

Details
- Victims: 11–15
- Span of crimes: 1989–2000
- Country: Soviet Union, later Russia
- State: Altai
- Date apprehended: May 2023

Vitaly Yegorovich Manishin (Russian: Вита́лий Его́рович Мани́шин; born 10 November 1971), known as The Barnaul Maniac (Russian: Барнаульский маньяк), is a Soviet–Russian serial killer who raped and murdered at least 11 young girls and women in Barnaul and Buranovo from 1989 to 2000.

The case remained unsolved and was a subject of media speculation for decades. Manishin was identified as the prime suspect in 2023 after he was linked to some of the murders via DNA, after which he admitted responsibility for the crimes. He was convicted in 2025 and sentenced to 25 years imprisonment.

== Life prior to exposure ==
Vitaly Manishin was born on 10 November 1971 in the village of Zelyonaya Dubrava, Altai Krai. He grew up in a stable family and was regarded as an average teenager throughout his school years.

After graduating in the early 1990s, he enrolled in the Altai State University's Faculty of Veterinary Medicine, from which he later found job as the chief veterinarian at the Shadrinskoye Company. At the same time, he became actively involved in politics and became the head of the village council in Shadrino. Later on, Manishin was invited to take the position of deputy head of the Kalmansky District administration, where he worked until March 2023. He was married twice.

Manishin was positively regarded by everybody around him, and was often noted for his intelligence, self-discipline, and education. In 2013, a local newspaper named Zarya Priobya published an article about Manishin's run for the village council, describing him as a man who deeply cared for his constituents and knew most of the older residents by name.

== Crimes ==
Manishin's first known victim was 17-year-old Lyudmila Obidina, who was killed on 16 September 1989 in Zelyonaya Dubrava. The victim's remains were found in September 1990. After this murder, he is not known to have committed another violent crime until 1998.

On 7 June 1998, an applicant to the Altai State Pedagogical University named Yana Shalamova disappeared. A week later, her body was discovered by fishermen floating in the Ob River. Experts concluded that the girl had been strangled. In the same month, about 10 days after the disappearance of the first girl, another applicant named Galina Derina also went missing. A month later, her body, covered with injuries likely caused by a sharp object, was found buried in the forest belt near Buranovo. Both students are believed to be possible victims of Manishin, but he has not been charged with their murders.

In the summer of 1999, four girls disappeared from Barnaul, all of them applicants to the Altai State Pedagogical University. The first was 21-year-old Choduraa Oorzhak, who went missing on 28 June; followed by 27-year-old Novosibirsk native Svetlana Filipchenko in July and ending with 25-year-old Natalya Berdysheva from Zarinsk, who had come to the city to study at a technical school. That same summer, another woman named Svetlana Oparina also disappeared that summer, but Manishin has not been conclusively linked to her case.

In the period between June and August 2000, a total of five university entrants disappeared in Barnaul: Yulia Tekhtieva (29 June), Liliana Wozniuk (28 July), Olga Shmakova (1 August), Angela Burdakova (August 8th) and Ksenia Kirgizova (15 August). All of the girls were last seen at the university.

In the midst of these disappearances, another 17-year-old Elena Anisimova was also reported missing on 12 July while attempting to enroll at Vocational School No. 35. That same July, two women vanished from the city just days later: 54-year-old Valentina Mihaylyukova from the Romanovsky District (on 14 July), and 43-year-old Nina Shakirova from the Krasnoshchyokovsky District (on 18 July).

== Investigation ==
During the preliminary investigation, a total of 35,000 people were interviewed, including teachers, workers, students and university graduates. Several of the applicants said that during the exam period, they met a man who offered help with admissions: aged 40–45, of average build, 175–180 cm (5.74–5.91 ft) in height, with dark brown, messy hair and overall nice facial features. A composite sketch was drawn, and later shown on local television. According to said sketch, employees at the Altai State Technical University pointed towards one of their colleagues, who was taken in for questioning, but his involvement in the disappearances couldn't be proven. In total, 71 photographs of individuals who offered work applications at the Barnaul universities were compiled, and even car owners who parked in nearby parking lots were checked, but it still didn't lead to an arrest.

On 4 September, near the village of Yuzhny, in the forest along the Barnaul-Rubtsovsk Highway, torn clothes, a notebook, a certificate from the State Technical University and a map of the university itself, items which belonged to Kirgizova, were located. While examining the area, investigators uncovered 5 fresh graves in the village cemetery, which the locals didn't recognize. They were opened up but turned up empty.

In early October, near Buranovo, local residents discovered a skeletonized female corpse. Examinations later established that the remains belonged to Angela Burdakova. In the same month, the remains of Kirgizova, Mihaylyukova, Shakirova and Oprarina were found. In 2001, the remains of Shmakova and Tekhtieva were discovered, on May 17 and September 23, respectively, followed by those of Wozniuk the next year.

Psychiatrists tried to recreate the profile of the alleged offender: he was 35–40 years old, married, had children, had a car and his work allowed him to take absences for a significant period of time.

=== Initial suspects ===
On 11 September 2000, a student at the Altai State Technical University contacted Barnaul's Internal Affairs Directorate and said that she recognized a man whom she had seen repeatedly during the exam period. They met in the clothing market, with the man introducing himself as a dean from the Faculty of Economics and offering help with admissions. He was identified as 45-year-old Alexander Anisimov, who had previous convictions for hooliganism and theft, and promptly placed on surveillance. Customers from the market described him as a very sociable and helpful person, a married man with three children who owned a VAZ-2109.

On 27 October, Anisimov was detained. When a police search was conducted in his apartment and garage, the police located two axes, knives, a shotgun, a hunting rifle, bullets and handcuffs. Initially, he denied ever setting foot on the grounds of Altai State Technical University, but 11 students confirmed that Anisimov had proposed to solve their problems with admissions. Three days later, he wrote down a confession, where he declared his involvement in the disappearance and murders of the five girls who vanished between June and August 2000, with his alleged motive being robbery.

While in jail, Anisimov unsuccessfully tried to hang himself on a jacket cord. On 1 November, during an investigative experiment in a 9-storey building on Georgy Isakov Street, in which he was supposed to identify a tenant to whom he had sold the murdered girls' jewels, he jumped out of the 8th-floor window and plunged to his death. After his death, the investigation into the murders ceased.

However, in an interview with the former head of the Police Department of Barnaul, Major General Nikolai Turbovets, conducted on 11 June 2019, he expressed his still-lingering uncertainty concerning whether Anisimov was the culprit.

Aside from Anisimov, other suspects questioned in the June–August disappearances included serial killers Alexey Ryzhkov (who was in prison at the time of the murders) and Alexander Pavlenko, as well as the Novosibirsk-based gang of Evgeny Kvashnin.

=== Arrest and prosecution of Manishin ===
In May 2023, Russian online publication Baza reported that police had arrested 52-year-old Vitaly Manishin for the murder of Lyudmila Obidina. At the time of his arrest, Manishin worked as a deputy head for the local government in the Kalmansky District, and served on the Housing and Communal Services, Construction and Gasification Committee.

It was reported that shortly after his arrest, Manishin suddenly confessed to killing the five students in Barnaul from June to August 2000. He said that at the time of the crimes, he used his position as a veterinarian and director of a local farm to meet with female students on the pretence of helping them get into the university. During interrogations with police officials in September, Manishin got confused and accidentally implicated himself in four additional murders committed from 1999 to 2000 - one of them being the murder of Valentina Mihaylyukova, a confirmed victim of the Barnaul Maniac.

In January 2024, journalists from Baza released a documentary film about the arrest, in which they alleged that Manishin confessed to an additional murder of a girl surnamed 'Filipchenko', but were unable to identify her at the time.

Manishin's trial began in 2024. After a lengthy trial, on 1 October 2025, the Kalmansky District Court convicted Manishin on all counts and sentenced him to 25 years imprisonment, with the first 7 being served in a strict-regime penal colony. The leniency of the sentence was due to the fact that the statute of limitations on most of the murders had lapsed.

== In the media ==
- The programme Independent Investigation (broadcast October 19, 2000, on NTV) covered the crimes in the episode "Barnaul, University Maniac".
- Documentary film Beauties and Monsters (first part) from the series "Criminal Russia".
- Documentary film The Case of the Barnaul Maniac.

== See also ==
- List of Russian serial killers
