= Shadrino =

Shadrino (Russian: Шадрино) is the name of several rural localities in Russia:

- Shadrino, Kalmansky District, Altai Krai, a selo in Shadrinsky Selsoviet of Kalmansky District, Altai Krai
- Shadrino, Amur Oblast, a selo in Chesnokovsky Selsoviet of Mikhaylovsky District, Amur Oblast
