= Kirpichyovsky =

Kirpichyovsky Кирпичёвский
- Khutor
- Location within Volgograd Oblast Location within Russia
- Coordinates: 50°51′N 42°46′E
- Country: Russia
- Region: Volgograd Oblast
- District: Novoanninsky District
- Time zone: UTC+4:00

Kirpichyovsky (Russian: Кирпичёвский) is a rural locality (a khutor) in Galushkinskoye Rural Settlement, Novoanninsky District, Volgograd Oblast, Russia. The population was 87 as of 2010. There are 2 streets.

== Geography ==
Kirpichyovsky is located 43 km north of Novoanninsky (the district's administrative centre) by road. Chelyshevsky is the nearest rural locality.
