= Buzuluk =

Buzuluk may refer to:

- Buzuluk, Orenburg Oblast, a town in Orenburg Oblast in Russia
- Buzuluk (inhabited locality), name of several inhabited localities in Russia
- Buzuluk (Orenburg Oblast), a river in Orenburg Oblast, Russia
- Buzuluk (Volgograd Oblast), a river in Volgograd Oblast, Russia
- Bazavluk, a river in Dnipropetrovsk Oblast, Ukraine, also known in Russian as Buzuluk
- Buzluq, Azerbaijan, also known as Buzuluk
