= Drobyazkin =

Drobyazkin Дробязкин
- Khutor
- Location within Volgograd Oblast Location within Russia
- Coordinates: 50°23′N 43°03′E
- Country: Russia
- Region: Volgograd Oblast
- District: Novoanninsky District
- Time zone: UTC+4:00

Drobyazkin (Russian: Дробязкин) is a rural locality (a khutor) in Novokiyevskoye Rural Settlement, Novoanninsky District, Volgograd Oblast, Russia. The population was 116 as of 2010. There are 3 streets.

== Geography ==
Drobyazkin is located in forest steppe on the Khopyorsko-Buzulukskaya Plain, 58 km southeast of Novoanninsky (the district's administrative centre) by road. Poltavsky is the nearest rural locality.
