= Novoromanovo =

Novoromanovo Новороманово
- Selo
- Location within Altai Krai Location within Russia
- Coordinates: 53°05′N 83°22′E
- Country: Russia
- Region: Altai Krai
- District: Kalmansky District
- Time zone: UTC+7:00

Novoromanovo (Russian: Новороманово) is a rural locality (a selo) and the administrative center of Novoromanovsky Selsoviet, Kalmansky District, Altai Krai, Russia. The population was 3,144 as of 2013. There are 20 streets.

== Geography ==
Novoromanovo is located 27 km northwest of Kalmanka (the district's administrative centre) by road. Alexandrovka is the nearest rural locality.
