= Staroanninskaya =

Staroanninskaya Староаннинская
- Stanitsa
- Location within Volgograd Oblast Location within Russia
- Coordinates: 50°29′N 42°32′E
- Country: Russia
- Region: Volgograd Oblast
- District: Novoanninsky District
- Time zone: UTC+4:00

Staroanninskaya (Russian: Староаннинская) is a rural locality (a stanitsa) and the administrative center of Staroanninskoye Rural Settlement, Novoanninsky District, Volgograd Oblast, Russia. The population was 808 as of 2010. There are 16 streets.

== Geography ==
Staroanninskaya is located on the left bank of the Buzuluk River, 15 km southwest of Novoanninsky (the district's administrative centre) by road. Kozlinovsky is the nearest rural locality.
