= Deminsky =

Deminsky Деминский
- Khutor
- Location within Volgograd Oblast Location within Russia
- Coordinates: 50°34′N 42°17′E
- Country: Russia
- Region: Volgograd Oblast
- District: Novoanninsky District
- Time zone: UTC+4:00

Deminsky (Russian: Деминский) is a rural locality (a khutor) and the administrative center of Deminskoye Rural Settlement, Novoanninsky District, Volgograd Oblast, Russia. The population was 839 as of 2010. There are 8 streets.

== Geography ==
Deminsky is located in steppe on the Khopyorsko-Buzulukskaya Plain, 37 km northwest of Novoanninsky (the district's administrative centre) by road. Kosovsky is the nearest rural locality.
