= Filonovskaya =

Filonovskaya Филоновская
- Stanitsa
- Location within Volgograd Oblast Location within Russia
- Coordinates: 50°34′N 42°43′E
- Country: Russia
- Region: Volgograd Oblast
- District: Novoanninsky District
- Time zone: UTC+4:00

Filonovskaya (Russian: Филоновская) is a rural locality (a stanitsa) and the administrative center of Filonovskoye Rural Settlement, Novoanninsky District, Volgograd Oblast, Russia. The population was 1,227 as of 2010. There are 22 streets.

== Geography ==
Filonovskaya is located in a forest steppe on the Khopyorsko-Buzulukskaya Plain, along the bank of the Buzuluk River, 14 km northeast of Novoanninsky (the district's administrative centre) by road. Budennovsky is the nearest rural locality.
