= Novoselsky =

Novoselsky Новосельский
- Settlement
- Location within Volgograd Oblast Location within Russia
- Coordinates: 50°22′N 42°59′E
- Country: Russia
- Region: Volgograd Oblast
- District: Novoanninsky District
- Time zone: UTC+4:00

Novoselsky (Russian: Новосельский) is a rural locality (a settlement) in Panfilovskoye Rural Settlement, Novoanninsky District, Volgograd Oblast, Russia. The population was 520 as of 2010. There are 6 streets.

== Geography ==
Novoselsky is located in forest steppe on the Khopyorsko-Buzulukskaya Plain, 40 km southeast of Novoanninsky (the district's administrative centre) by road. Zaprudny is the nearest rural locality.
