= Makhinovsky =

Makhinovsky Махиновский
- Khutor
- Location within Volgograd Oblast Location within Russia
- Coordinates: 50°23′N 43°06′E
- Country: Russia
- Region: Volgograd Oblast
- District: Novoanninsky District
- Time zone: UTC+4:00

Makhinovsky (Russian: Махиновский) is a rural locality (a khutor) in Novokiyevskoye Rural Settlement, Novoanninsky District, Volgograd Oblast, Russia. The population was 71 as of 2010. There are 4 streets.

== Geography ==
Makhinovsky is located in steppe on the Khopyorsko-Buzulukskaya Plain, 53 km southeast of Novoanninsky (the district's administrative centre) by road. Novokiyevka is the nearest rural locality.
