= Shilovsky =

Shilovsky (masculine), Shilovskaya (feminine), or Shilovskoye (neuter) may refer to:

- Shilovsky District, a district of Ryazan Oblast
- Pyotr Shilovsky (1872-1955), Russian gouvernor and jurist
- Vsevolod Shilovsky (1938–2025), Russian actor
- Shilovsky (rural locality) (Shilovskaya, Shilovskoye), name of several rural localities in Russia

== See also ==
- Shilovo
