= Cherkesovsky =

Cherkesovsky Черкесовский
- Khutor
- Location within Volgograd Oblast Location within Russia
- Coordinates: 50°41′N 42°33′E
- Country: Russia
- Region: Volgograd Oblast
- District: Novoanninsky District
- Time zone: UTC+4:00

Cherkesovsky (Russian: Черкесовский) is a rural locality (a khutor) and the administrative center of Cherkesovskoye Rural Settlement, Novoanninsky District, Volgograd Oblast, Russia. The population was 1,545 as of 2010. There are 29 streets.

== Geography ==
Cherkesovsky is located in steppe on the Khopyorsko-Buzulukskaya Plain, on the bank of the Kumylga River, 27 km northwest of Novoanninsky (the district's administrative centre) by road. Pyshkinsky is the nearest rural locality.
