= Krasnokorotkovsky =

Krasnokorotkovsky Краснокоротковский
- Khutor
- Location within Volgograd Oblast Location within Russia
- Coordinates: 50°36′N 42°39′E
- Country: Russia
- Region: Volgograd Oblast
- District: Novoanninsky District
- Time zone: UTC+4:00

Krasnokorotkovsky (Russian: Краснокоротковский) is a rural locality (a khutor) and the administrative center of Krasnokorotkovskoye Rural Settlement, Novoanninsky District, Volgograd Oblast, Russia. The population was 570 in 2010. There are 6 streets.

== Geography ==
Krasnokorotkovsky is located 10 km north of Novoanninsky (the district's administrative centre) by road. Budennovsky is the nearest rural locality.
