= Galushkinsky =

Galushkinsky Галушкинский
- Khutor
- Location within Volgograd Oblast Location within Russia
- Coordinates: 50°44′N 42°50′E
- Country: Russia
- Region: Volgograd Oblast
- District: Novoanninsky District
- Time zone: UTC+4:00

Galushkinsky (Russian: Галушкинский) is a rural locality (a khutor) and the administrative center of Galushkinskoye Rural Settlement, Novoanninsky District, Volgograd Oblast, Russia. The population was 867 as of 2010. There are 15 streets.

== Geography ==
Galushkinsky is located on the Khopyorsko-Buzulukskaya Plain, on the right bank of the Kardail River, 31 km northeast of Novoanninsky (the district's administrative centre) by road. Dubrovsky is the nearest rural locality.
