= Ust-Aleyka =

Ust-Aleyka Усть-Алейка
- Village
- Location within Altai Krai Location within Russia
- Coordinates: 52°49′N 83°35′E
- Country: Russia
- Region: Altai Krai
- District: Kalmansky District
- Time zone: UTC+7:00

Ust-Aleyka (Russian: Усть-Алейка) is a rural locality (a selo) and the administrative center of Ust-Aleysky Selsoviet of Kalmansky District, Altai Krai, Russia. The population was 532 as of 2016. There are 5 streets.

== Geography ==
Ust-Aleyka is located 10 km south of Kalmanka (the district's administrative centre) by road. Nagorny is the nearest rural locality.
