= Chelyshevsky =

Chelyshevsky Челышевский
- Khutor
- Location within Volgograd Oblast Location within Russia
- Coordinates: 50°49′N 42°48′E
- Country: Russia
- Region: Volgograd Oblast
- District: Novoanninsky District
- Time zone: UTC+4:00

Chelyshevsky (Russian: Челышевский) is a rural locality (a khutor) in Galushkinskoye Rural Settlement, Novoanninsky District, Volgograd Oblast, Russia. The population was 129 as of 2010. There are 2 streets.

== Geography ==
Chelyshevsky is located 40 km northeast of Novoanninsky (the district's administrative centre) by road. Kirpichevsky is the nearest rural locality.
