= Atamanovsky =

Atamanovsky Атамановский
- Khutor
- Location within Volgograd Oblast Location within Russia
- Coordinates: 50°23′N 43°21′E
- Country: Russia
- Region: Volgograd Oblast
- District: Novoanninsky District
- Time zone: UTC+4:00

Atamanovsky (Russian: Атамановский) is a rural locality (a khutor) in Trostyanskoye Rural Settlement, Novoanninsky District, Volgograd Oblast, Russia. The population was 18 as of 2010. There are 2 streets.

== Geography ==
Atamanovsky is located in forest steppe on the Khopyorsko-Buzulukskaya Plain, 72 km southeast of Novoanninsky (the district's administrative centre) by road. Popov is the nearest rural locality.
