= Novokiyevka, Volgograd Oblast =

Novokiyevka Новокиевка
- Khutor
- Location within Volgograd Oblast Location within Russia
- Coordinates: 50°25′N 43°08′E
- Country: Russia
- Region: Volgograd Oblast
- District: Novoanninsky District
- Time zone: UTC+4:00

Novokiyevka (Russian: Новокиевка) is a rural locality (a khutor) and the administrative center of Novokiyevskoye Rural Settlement, Novoanninsky District, Volgograd Oblast, Russia. The population was 762 as of 2010. There are 15 streets.

== Geography ==
Novokiyevka is located on the Khopyorsko-Buzulukskaya Plain, 50 km southeast of Novoanninsky (the district's administrative centre) by road. Talovsky is the nearest rural locality.
