= Yastrebovsky =

Yastrebovsky Ястребовский
- Khutor
- Location within Volgograd Oblast Location within Russia
- Coordinates: 50°38′N 42°24′E
- Country: Russia
- Region: Volgograd Oblast
- District: Novoanninsky District
- Time zone: UTC+4:00

Yastrebovsky (Russian: Ястребовский) is a rural locality (a khutor) in Beryozovskoye Rural Settlement, Novoanninsky District, Volgograd Oblast, Russia. The population was 4 as of 2010.

== Geography ==
Yastrebovsky is located on the Panika River, 36 km northwest of Novoanninsky (the district's administrative centre) by road. Popovsky is the nearest rural locality.
