= Posyolok sovkhoza AMO =

Posyolok sovkhoza AMO Посёлок совхоза «АМО»
- Settlement
- Location within Volgograd Oblast Location within Russia
- Coordinates: 50°25′N 42°55′E
- Country: Russia
- Region: Volgograd Oblast
- District: Novoanninsky District
- Time zone: UTC+4:00

Posyolok sovkhoza AMO (Russian: Посёлок совхоза «АМО») is a rural locality (a settlement) and the administrative center of Amovskoye Rural Settlement, Novoanninsky District, Volgograd Oblast, Russia. The population was 782 as of 2010. There are 19 streets.

== Geography ==
The settlement is located in steppe on the Khopyorsko-Buzulukskaya Plain, 9 km southeast of Novoanninsky (the district's administrative centre) by road. Novoanninsky is the nearest rural locality.
