= Beryozovka 2-ya =

Beryozovka 2-ya Берёзовка 2-я
- Khutor
- Location within Volgograd Oblast Location within Russia
- Coordinates: 50°32′N 42°33′E
- Country: Russia
- Region: Volgograd Oblast
- District: Novoanninsky District
- Time zone: UTC+4:00

Beryozovka 2-ya (Russian: Берёзовка 2-я) is a rural locality (a khutor) in Beryozovskoye Rural Settlement, Novoanninsky District, Volgograd Oblast, Russia. The population was 268 as of 2010. There are 5 streets.

== Geography ==
Beryozovka 2-ya is located in steppe on the Khopyorsko-Buzulukskaya Plain, 17 km northwest of Novoanninsky (the district's administrative centre) by road. Beryozovka 1-ya is the nearest rural locality.
