= Budyonnovsky (rural locality) =

Budyonnovsky (Russian: Будённовский; masculine), Budyonnovskaya (Будённовская; feminine), or Budyonnovskoye (Будённовское; neuter) is the name of several rural localities in Russia:

- Budennovsky, Republic of Bashkortostan, a village in Baltiysky Selsoviet of Iglinsky District of the Republic of Bashkortostan
- Budennovsky, Kursk Oblast, a settlement in Melovsky Selsoviet of Dmitriyevsky District of Kursk Oblast
- Budennovsky, Volgograd Oblast, a khutor in Krasnokorotkovsky Selsoviet of Novoanninsky District of Volgograd Oblast
- Budennovskaya, a stanitsa in Budennovskoye Rural Settlement of Proletarsky District of Rostov Oblast
