= Vostochny, Volgograd Oblast =

Vostochny Восточный
- Khutor
- Location within Volgograd Oblast Location within Russia
- Coordinates: 50°46′N 42°44′E
- Country: Russia
- Region: Volgograd Oblast
- District: Novoanninsky District
- Time zone: UTC+4:00

Vostochny (Russian: Восточный) is a rural locality (a khutor) in Polevoye Rural Settlement, Novoanninsky District, Volgograd Oblast, Russia. The population was 76 as of 2010. There are 4 streets.

== Geography ==
Vostochny is located in forest steppe on the Khopyorsko-Buzulukskaya Plain, 38 km north of Novoanninsky (the district's administrative centre) by road. Galushkinsky is the nearest rural locality.
