= Bolshoy Dubovsky =

Bolshoy Dubovsky Большой Дубовский
- Khutor
- Location within Volgograd Oblast Location within Russia
- Coordinates: 50°34′N 42°23′E
- Country: Russia
- Region: Volgograd Oblast
- District: Novoanninsky District
- Time zone: UTC+4:00

Bolshoy Dubovsky (Russian: Большой Дубовский) is a rural locality (a khutor) in Deminskoye Rural Settlement, Novoanninsky District, Volgograd Oblast, Russia. The population was 53 as of 2010.

== Geography ==
Bolshoy Dubovsky is located in forest steppe on the Khopyorsko-Buzulukskaya Plain, on the Panika River, 31 km northwest of Novoanninsky (the district's administrative centre) by road. Popovsky is the nearest rural locality.
