= Novoanninsky =

Novoanninsky (masculine), Novoanninskaya (feminine), or Novoanninskoye (neuter) may refer to:

- Novoanninsky District, a district of Volgograd Oblast, Russia
- Novoanninsky Urban Settlement, a municipal formation which the town of district significance of Novoanninsky in Novoanninsky District of Volgograd Oblast, Russia is incorporated as
- Novoanninsky (town), a town in Novoanninsky District of Volgograd Oblast, Russia
