= Kuznetsovsky, Novoanninsky District, Volgograd Oblast =

Kuznetsovsky Кузнецовский
- Khutor
- Location within Volgograd Oblast Location within Russia
- Coordinates: 50°26′N 42°41′E
- Country: Russia
- Region: Volgograd Oblast
- District: Novoanninsky District
- Time zone: UTC+4:00

Kuznetsovsky (Russian: Кузнецовский) is a rural locality (a khutor) in Bocharovskoye Rural Settlement, Novoanninsky District, Volgograd Oblast, Russia. The population was 237 as of 2010. There are 6 streets.

== Geography ==
Kuznetsovsky 14 km south of Novoanninsky (the district's administrative centre) by road. Gulyayevsky is the nearest rural locality.
