= Novobarnaulka =

Novobarnaulka Новобарнаулка
- Selo
- Location within Altai Krai Location within Russia
- Coordinates: 53°02′N 83°04′E
- Country: Russia
- Region: Altai Krai
- District: Kalmansky District
- Time zone: UTC+7:00

Novobarnaulka (Russian: Новобарнаулка) is a rural locality (a selo) in Shilovsky Selsoviet, Kalmansky District, Altai Krai, Russia. The population was 121 as of 2013. There are 2 streets.

== Geography ==
Novobarnaulka is located 41 km northwest of Kalmanka (the district's administrative centre) by road. Chayachye is the nearest rural locality.
