= Shilovsky (rural locality) =

Shilovsky (Russian: Шиловский; masculine), Shilovskaya (Шиловская; feminine), or Shilovskoye (Шиловское; neuter) is the name of several rural localities in Russia:

- Shilovsky, Altai Krai, a crossing loop in Shilovsky Selsoviet of Kalmansky District of Altai Krai
- Shilovsky, Livensky District, Oryol Oblast, a settlement in Rechitsky Selsoviet of Livensky District of Oryol Oblast
- Shilovsky, Orlovsky District, Oryol Oblast, a settlement in Loshakovsky Selsoviet of Orlovsky District of Oryol Oblast
- Shilovskoye, Vladimir Oblast, a village in Kovrovsky District of Vladimir Oblast
- Shilovskoye, Yaroslavl Oblast, a village in Nikolsky Rural Okrug of Danilovsky District of Yaroslavl Oblast
- Shilovskaya, Plesetsky District, Arkhangelsk Oblast, a village in Yarnemsky Selsoviet of Plesetsky District in Arkhangelsk Oblast
- Shilovskaya, Shenkursky District, Arkhangelsk Oblast, a village in Ust-Padengsky Selsoviet of Shenkursky District of Arkhangelsk Oblast
- Shilovskaya, Velsky District, Arkhangelsk Oblast, a village in Ust-Velsky Selsoviet of Velsky District of Arkhangelsk Oblast
- Shilovskaya, Ivanovo Oblast, a village in Pestyakovsky District of Ivanovo Oblast
