= Pyshkinsky =

Pyshkinsky Пышкинский
- Khutor
- Location within Volgograd Oblast Location within Russia
- Coordinates: 50°40′N 42°37′E
- Country: Russia
- Region: Volgograd Oblast
- District: Novoanninsky District
- Time zone: UTC+4:00

Pyshkinsky (Russian: Пышкинский) is a rural locality (a khutor) in Polevoye Rural Settlement, Novoanninsky District, Volgograd Oblast, Russia. The population was 18 as of 2010.

== Geography ==
Pyshkinsky is located in forest steppe on the Khopyorsko-Buzulukskaya Plain, 18 km north of Novoanninsky (the district's administrative centre) by road. Cherkesovsky is the nearest rural locality.
