= Zimari =

Zimari Зимари
- Selo
- Location within Altai Krai Location within Russia
- Coordinates: 53°11′N 83°27′E
- Country: Russia
- Region: Altai Krai
- District: Kalmansky District
- Time zone: UTC+7:00

Zimari (Russian: Зимари) is a rural locality (a selo) and the administrative center of Zimaryovsky Selsoviet, Kalmansky District, Altai Krai, Russia. The population was 775 as of 2013. There are 30 streets.

== Geography ==
Zimari is located 39 km north of Kalmanka (the district's administrative centre) by road. Prudskoy is the nearest rural locality.
