= Burnatsky =

Burnatsky Бурнацкий
- Khutor
- Location within Volgograd Oblast Location within Russia
- Coordinates: 50°25′N 42°57′E
- Country: Russia
- Region: Volgograd Oblast
- District: Novoanninsky District
- Time zone: UTC+4:00

Burnatsky (Russian: Бурнацкий) is a rural locality (a khutor) in Amovskoye Rural Settlement, Novoanninsky District, Volgograd Oblast, Russia. The population was 152 as of 2010. There are 3 streets.

== Geography ==
Burnatsky is located 37 km southeast of Novoanninsky (the district's administrative centre) by road. Posyolok sovkhoza AMO is the nearest rural locality.
