= Zaprudny =

Zaprudny Запрудный
- Settlement
- Location within Volgograd Oblast Location within Russia
- Coordinates: 50°22′N 42°56′E
- Country: Russia
- Region: Volgograd Oblast
- District: Novoanninsky District
- Time zone: UTC+4:00

Zaprudny (Russian: Запрудный) is a rural locality (a settlement) in Panfilovskoye Rural Settlement, Novoanninsky District, Volgograd Oblast, Russia. The population was 7 as of 2010. There are 2 streets.

== Geography ==
Zaprudny is located in steppe on the Khopyorsko-Buzulukskaya Plain, 37 km southeast of Novoanninsky (the district's administrative centre) by road. Trud-Rassvet is the nearest rural locality.
