= Alsyapinsky =

Alsyapinsky Альсяпинский
- Khutor
- Location within Volgograd Oblast Location within Russia
- Coordinates: 50°41′N 42°48′E
- Country: Russia
- Region: Volgograd Oblast
- District: Novoanninsky District
- Time zone: UTC+4:00

Alsyapinsky (Russian: Альсяпинский) is a rural locality (a khutor) in Galushkinskoye Rural Settlement, Novoanninsky District, Volgograd Oblast, Russia. The population was 152 as of 2010. There are 2 streets.

== Geography ==
Alsyapinsky is located on the Khopyorsko-Buzulukskaya Plain, on the right bank of the Buzuluk River, 24 km northeast of Novoanninsky (the district's administrative centre) by road. Rog-Izmaylovsky is the nearest rural locality.
