= Salomatin =

Salomatin Саломатин
- Khutor
- Location within Volgograd Oblast Location within Russia
- Coordinates: 50°37′N 42°50′E
- Country: Russia
- Region: Volgograd Oblast
- District: Novoanninsky District
- Time zone: UTC+4:00

Salomatin (Russian: Саломатин) is a rural locality (a khutor) in Filonovskoye Rural Settlement, Novoanninsky District, Volgograd Oblast, Russia. The population was 374 as of 2010. There are 9 streets.

== Geography ==
Salomatin is located on the Khopyorsko-Buzulukskaya Plain, on the bank of the Buzuluk River, 22 km northeast of Novoanninsky (the district's administrative centre) by road. Rozhnovsky is the nearest rural locality.
