= Altay (name) =

- Gender: Male

Origin
- Language: Turkish

Other names
- Related names: Altan

Altay is a common Turkish given name and a surname which may refer to:

== Given name ==
- Altay Bayındır (born 1998), Turkish footballer
- Altay Mehdiyev, major general and commander of the Azerbaijani Air Forces (2009–2013)
- Altay Öktem (born 1964), Turkish poet, writer, researcher and doctor
- Altay Özurgancı (born 1988), Turkish basketball player
- Altay Saidov (1926–2015), Azerbaijani scenic painter
- Altay Sarsenuly Amanzholov (1934–2012), Kazakh Turkologist

== Surname ==
- Ceyhun Altay (born 1986), Turkish basketball player
- Engin Altay (born 1963), Turkish politician
- Fahrettin Altay (1880–1974), Turkish general
- Halife Altay (1917–2003), Kazakh author and anthropologist
- Seray Altay (born 1987), Turkish volleyball player
