= Posyolok otdeleniya 2 sovkhoza AMO =

Posyolok otdeleniya 2 sovkhoza AMO Посёлок отделения № 2 совхоза «АМО»
- Settlement
- Location within Volgograd Oblast Location within Russia
- Coordinates: 50°27′N 42°55′E
- Country: Russia
- Region: Volgograd Oblast
- District: Novoanninsky District
- Time zone: UTC+4:00

Posyolok otdeleniya 2 sovkhoza AMO (Russian: Посёлок отделения № 2 совхоза «АМО») is a rural locality (a settlement) in Amovskoye Rural Settlement, Novoanninsky District, Volgograd Oblast, Russia. The population was 132 as of 2010. There are 4 streets.

== Geography ==
The settlement is located in steppe on the Khopyorsko-Buzulukskaya Plain, 35 km southeast of Novoanninsky (the district's administrative centre) by road. Burnatsky is the nearest rural locality.
