= Goslesopitomnik =

Goslesopitomnik Гослесопитомник
- Khutor
- Location within Volgograd Oblast Location within Russia
- Coordinates: 50°35′N 42°45′E
- Country: Russia
- Region: Volgograd Oblast
- District: Novoanninsky District
- Time zone: UTC+4:00

Goslesopitomnik (Russian: Гослесопитомник) is a rural locality (a khutor) in Filonovskoye Rural Settlement, Novoanninsky District, Volgograd Oblast, Russia. The population was 57 as of 2010.

== Geography ==
Goslesopitomnik is located in forest steppe on the Khopyorsko-Buzulukskaya Plain, 14 km northeast of Novoanninsky (the district's administrative centre) by road. Filonovskaya is the nearest rural locality.
