= Kalistratikha =

Kalistratikha Калистратиха
- Village
- Location within Altai Krai Location within Russia
- Coordinates: 52°59′N 83°35′E
- Country: Russia
- Region: Altai Krai
- District: Kalmansky District
- Time zone: UTC+7:00

Kalistratikha (Russian: Калистратиха) is a rural locality (a selo) and the administrative center of Kalistratikhinsky Selsoviet of Kalmansky District, Altai Krai, Russia. The population was 883 as of 2016. There are 16 streets.

== Geography ==
Kalistratikha is located on the right bank of the Eraska River, 13 km north of Kalmanka (the district's administrative centre) by road. Buranovo is the nearest rural locality.

== Ethnicity ==
The village is inhabited by Russians and others.
