= Beryozovka 1-ya =

Beryozovka 1-ya Берёзовка 1-я
- Khutor
- Location within Volgograd Oblast Location within Russia
- Coordinates: 50°32′N 42°36′E
- Country: Russia
- Region: Volgograd Oblast
- District: Novoanninsky District
- Time zone: UTC+4:00

Beryozovka 1-ya (Russian: Берёзовка 1-я) is a rural locality (a khutor) and the administrative center of Beryozovskoye Rural Settlement, Novoanninsky District, Volgograd Oblast, Russia. The population was 698 as of 2010. There are 15 streets.

== Geography ==
Beryozovka 1-ya is located in steppe on the Khopyorsko-Buzulukskaya Plain, on the right bank of the Buzuluk River, 11 km northwest of Novoanninsky (the district's administrative centre) by road. Novoanninsky is the nearest rural locality.
