= Satarovsky =

Satarovsky Сатаровский
- Khutor
- Location within Volgograd Oblast Location within Russia
- Coordinates: 50°16′N 42°35′E
- Country: Russia
- Region: Volgograd Oblast
- District: Novoanninsky District
- Time zone: UTC+4:00

Satarovsky (Russian: Сатаровский) is a rural locality (a khutor) in Bocharovskoye Rural Settlement, Novoanninsky District, Volgograd Oblast, Russia. The population was 243 as of 2010. There are 9 streets.

== Geography ==
Satarovsky is located 38 km southwest of Novoanninsky, (the district's administrative centre) by road. Krasny Oktyabr is the nearest rural locality.
