= Zvyozdka =

Zvyozdka Звёздка
- Khutor
- Location within Volgograd Oblast Location within Russia
- Coordinates: 50°45′30″N 42°32′42″E
- Country: Russia
- Region: Volgograd Oblast
- District: Novoanninsky District
- Time zone: UTC+4:00

Zvyozdka (Russian: Звёздка) is a rural locality (a khutor) in Cherkesovskoye Rural Settlement, Novoanninsky District, Volgograd Oblast, Russia. The population was 49 as of 2010.

== Geography ==
Zvyozdka is located in forest steppe on the Khopyorsko-Buzulukskaya Plain, 38 km northeast of Novoanninsky (the district's administrative centre) by road. Verbochny is the nearest rural locality.
