= Pereshchepnovsky =

Pereshchepnovsky Перещепновский
- Khutor
- Location within Volgograd Oblast Location within Russia
- Coordinates: 50°28′N 42°26′E
- Country: Russia
- Region: Volgograd Oblast
- District: Novoanninsky District
- Time zone: UTC+4:00

Pereshchepnovsky (Russian: Перещепновский) is a rural locality (a khutor) in Staroanninskoye Rural Settlement, Novoanninsky District, Volgograd Oblast, Russia. The population was 78 as of 2010. There are 2 streets.

== Geography ==
Pereshchepnovsky is located on the bank of the Buzuluk River, 21 km southwest of Novoanninsky (the district's administrative centre) by road. Borisovskiy is the nearest rural locality.
