= Popov, Novoanninsky District, Volgograd Oblast =

Popov Попов
- Khutor
- Location within Volgograd Oblast Location within Russia
- Coordinates: 50°23′25″N 43°16′39″E
- Country: Russia
- Region: Volgograd Oblast
- District: Novoanninsky District
- Time zone: UTC+4:00

Popov (Russian: Попов) is a rural locality (a khutor) in Trostyanskoye Rural Settlement, Novoanninsky District, Volgograd Oblast, Russia. The population was 250 as of 2010. There are 11 streets.

== Geography ==
Popov is located in forest steppe on the Khopyorsko-Buzulukskaya Plain, 66 km southeast of Novoanninsky (the district's administrative centre) by road. Atamanovsky is the nearest rural locality.
