= Kozlinovsky =

Kozlinovsky Козлиновский
- Khutor
- Location within Volgograd Oblast Location within Russia
- Coordinates: 50°28′N 42°31′E
- Country: Russia
- Region: Volgograd Oblast
- District: Novoanninsky District
- Time zone: UTC+4:00

Kozlinovsky (Russian: Козлиновский) is a rural locality (a khutor) in Staroanninskoye Rural Settlement, Novoanninsky District, Volgograd Oblast, Russia. The population was 248 as of 2010. There are 3 streets.

== Geography ==
Kozlinovsky is located on the Bolshiye Yaryzhki Lake, 16 km southwest of Novoanninsky (the district's administrative centre) by road. Staroanninskaya is the nearest rural locality.
