= Durnovsky =

Durnovsky Дурновский
- Khutor
- Location within Volgograd Oblast Location within Russia
- Coordinates: 50°28′N 42°24′E
- Country: Russia
- Region: Volgograd Oblast
- District: Novoanninsky District
- Time zone: UTC+4:00

Durnovsky (Russian: Дурновский) is a rural locality (a khutor) in Staroanninskoye Rural Settlement, Novoanninsky District, Volgograd Oblast, Russia. The population was 432 as of 2010. There are 5 streets.

== Geography ==
Durnovsky is located in forest steppe on the Khopyorsko-Buzulukskaya Plain, on the left bank of the Buzuluk River, 24 km southwest of Novoanninsky (the district's administrative centre) by road. Tavolzhansky is the nearest rural locality.
