= Trostyansky =

Trostyansky Тростянский
- Settlement
- Location within Volgograd Oblast Location within Russia
- Coordinates: 50°28′N 43°13′E
- Country: Russia
- Region: Volgograd Oblast
- District: Novoanninsky District
- Time zone: UTC+4:00

Trostyansky (Russian: Тростянский) is a rural locality (a settlement) and the administrative center of Trostyanskoye Rural Settlement, Novoanninsky District, Volgograd Oblast, Russia. The population was 627 as of 2010. There are 16 streets.

== Geography ==
Trostyansky is located in forest steppe on the Khopyorsko-Buzulukskaya Plain, 56 km east of Novoanninsky (the district's administrative centre) by road. Udodovsky is the nearest rural locality.
