= Vikhlyayevsky =

Vikhlyayevsky Вихляевский
- Khutor
- Location within Volgograd Oblast Location within Russia
- Coordinates: 50°30′N 42°21′E
- Country: Russia
- Region: Volgograd Oblast
- District: Novoanninsky District
- Time zone: UTC+4:00

Vikhlyayevsky (Russian: Вихляевский) is a rural locality (a khutor) in Deminskoye Rural Settlement, Novoanninsky District, Volgograd Oblast, Russia. The population was 42 as of 2010.

== Geography ==
Vikhlyayevsky is located in forest steppe on the Khopyorsko-Buzulukskaya Plain, on the Ilmen Lake, 36 km west of Novoanninsky (the district's administrative centre) by road. Martynovsky is the nearest rural locality.
