= Trud-Rassvet =

Trud-Rassvet Труд-Рассвет
- Khutor
- Location within Volgograd Oblast Location within Russia
- Coordinates: 50°22′N 42°54′E
- Country: Russia
- Region: Volgograd Oblast
- District: Novoanninsky District
- Time zone: UTC+4:00

Trud-Rassvet (Russian: Труд-Рассвет) is a rural locality (a khutor) in Panfilovskoye Rural Settlement, Novoanninsky District, Volgograd Oblast, Russia. The population was 110 as of 2010. There are 4 streets.

== Geography ==
Trud-Rassvet is located in steppe on the Khopyorsko-Buzulukskaya Plain, 34 km southeast of Novoanninsky (the district's administrative centre) by road. Troyetsky is the nearest rural locality.
