= Rozhnovsky =

Rozhnovsky Рожновский
- Khutor
- Location within Volgograd Oblast Location within Russia
- Coordinates: 50°36′N 42°49′E
- Country: Russia
- Region: Volgograd Oblast
- District: Novoanninsky District
- Time zone: UTC+4:00

Rozhnovsky (Russian: Рожновский) is a rural locality (a khutor) in Filonovskoye Rural Settlement, Novoanninsky District, Volgograd Oblast, Russia. The population was 312 as of 2010. There are 8 streets.

== Geography ==
Rozhnovsky is located on the Khopyorsko-Buzulukskaya Plain, on the left bank of the Buzuluk River, 19 km northeast of Novoanninsky (the district's administrative centre) by road. Salomatin is the nearest rural locality.
