= Verbochny =

Verbochny Вербочный
- Khutor
- Location within Volgograd Oblast Location within Russia
- Coordinates: 50°46′N 42°33′E
- Country: Russia
- Region: Volgograd Oblast
- District: Novoanninsky District
- Time zone: UTC+4:00

Verbochny (Russian: Вербочный) is a rural locality (a khutor) in Polevoye Rural Settlement, Novoanninsky District, Volgograd Oblast, Russia. The population was 53 as of 2010. There are 2 streets.

== Geography ==
Verbochny is located in forest steppe on the Khopyorsko-Buzulukskaya Plain, 41 km north of Novoanninsky (the district's administrative centre) by road. Zvyozdka is the nearest rural locality.
