= Troyetsky =

Troyetsky Троецкий
- Khutor
- Location within Volgograd Oblast Location within Russia
- Coordinates: 50°21′N 42°51′E
- Country: Russia
- Region: Volgograd Oblast
- District: Novoanninsky District
- Time zone: UTC+4:00

Troyetsky (Russian: Троецкий) is a rural locality (a khutor) in Panfilovskoye Rural Settlement, Novoanninsky District, Volgograd Oblast, Russia. The population was 221 as of 2010. There are 7 streets.

== Geography ==
Troyetsky is located in forest steppe on the Khopyorsko-Buzulukskaya Plain, 31 km southeast of Novoanninsky (the district's administrative centre) by road. Trud-Rassvet is the nearest rural locality.
