= Gulyayevsky =

Gulyayevsky Гуляевский
- Khutor
- Location within Volgograd Oblast Location within Russia
- Coordinates: 50°24′N 42°44′E
- Country: Russia
- Region: Volgograd Oblast
- District: Novoanninsky District
- Time zone: UTC+4:00

Gulyayevsky (Russian: Гуляевский) is a rural locality (a khutor) in Bocharovskoye Rural Settlement, Novoanninsky District, Volgograd Oblast, Russia. The population was 242 as of 2010. There are 6 streets.

== Geography ==
Gulyayevsky is located 19 km southeast of Novoanninsky (the district's administrative centre) by road. Kuznetsovsky is the nearest rural locality.
