= Yaryzhensky =

Yaryzhensky Ярыженский
- Khutor
- Location within Volgograd Oblast Location within Russia
- Coordinates: 50°30′N 42°28′E
- Country: Russia
- Region: Volgograd Oblast
- District: Novoanninsky District
- Time zone: UTC+4:00

Yaryzhensky (Russian: Ярыженский) is a rural locality (a khutor) in Beryozovskoye Rural Settlement, Novoanninsky District, Volgograd Oblast, Russia. The population was 171 as of 2010. There are 3 streets.

== Geography ==
Yaryzhensky is located in forest steppe on the Khopyorsko-Buzulukskaya Plain, on the right bank of the Buzuluk River, 30 km west of Novoanninsky (the district's administrative centre) by road. Kleymenovsky is the nearest rural locality.
