= Shilovo, Altai Krai =

Shilovo Шилово
- Selo
- Location within Altai Krai Location within Russia
- Coordinates: 52°55′N 83°15′E
- Country: Russia
- Region: Altai Krai
- District: Kalmansky District
- Time zone: UTC+7:00

Shilovo (Russian: Шилово) is a rural locality (a selo) and the administrative center of Shilovsky Selsoviet, Kalmansky District, Altai Krai, Russia. The population was 418 as of 2013. There are 5 streets.

== Geography ==
Shilovo is located 21 km northwest of Kalmanka (the district's administrative centre) by road. Trud is the nearest rural locality.
