= Emanuel Vahl =

Ukrainian-Israeli composer (born 1938)

Emanuel Vahl (Hebrew: עמנואל ואל; born in 1938 in Odessa, Ukraine) is a Ukrainian-Israeli composer. Vahl has composed more than 100 works, including preludes, songs without words, and chamber music. He taught Harmony and Composition at the Conservatory "Hasadna" in Jerusalem, and now he teaches at the Dance Studio of Jerusalem. Vahl has been a member of the Union of Israeli Composers and AQUM since 1991.

== Life ==
Emanuel Wahl was evacuated together with his mother from Odessa in 1941 to the father's family in Altai, Siberia. His grandfather was a cantor and his father was killed fighting the Nazis. Emanuel Vahl studied at the School of Stolyarsky in Odessa, Ukraine and at the Moscow Conservatory. Vahl has organized 15 concerts with his own compositions at the Cultural Center "Hebrew Union College" in Jerusalem, the B'nai B'rith organization, Conservatory "Hasadna" in Jerusalem and the Blumenthal Library in Tel-Aviv, together with the composer Sara Faygin.

In 1990, he made his Aliyah to Israel.

== Selected works ==
Vahl's music is published by the Israeli Music Center.

- Symphony for a Symphonic Orchestra
- Symphonietta for a String Chamber Orchestra
- 18 Solo Sonatas – for violin, viola, cello, doublebass, flute, clarinet, trumpet, harp, guitar, marimba, piano, organ, and soprano solo
- Sonata for viola and piano, Op. 89 (2004)
- 5 Suites for piano
- Suites for oboe and piano
- Suite for horn and piano
- Suite for 2 cellos, Op. 67 (1999)
- Jewish Suite for strings
- These Suites were performed at the Festival "Sounds of the Desert" in 2004
- Suite for Guitar (printed in Quebec, Canada) in 2003
- Trio for Flute
- String Quartet
- Saxophone Quartet
- Jewish Rhapsody and "Hazanut" for saxophone quartet
- Jewish Ballade for saxophone octet
- Suite for wind quintet
- Adon Olam, Mass for a mixed choir
- Mode Ani Lefaneykha, Mass for a mixed choir
- Hine Ma Tov, Mass for a mixed choir
- Suites for children's choir
- Pieces of Hazanut for voice and piano: "Shema Israel", "Sim Shalom", "Halleluya", "Siman Tov", "Im Ta'hane Alay Ma'hane", "Eley Barekhev", "Isme'hu Bemalkhutekha"
- Mediterranean Dances for piano trio
- many children's songs
