= Budennovsky, Volgograd Oblast =

Budennovsky Будённовский
- Khutor
- Location within Volgograd Oblast Location within Russia
- Coordinates: 50°34′N 42°40′E
- Country: Russia
- Region: Volgograd Oblast
- District: Novoanninsky District
- Time zone: UTC+4:00

Budennovsky (Russian: Будённовский) is a rural locality (a khutor) in Krasnokorotkovskoye Rural Settlement, Novoanninsky District, Volgograd Oblast, Russia. The population was 29 as of 2010.

== Geography ==
Budennovsky is located in steppe on the Khopyorsko-Buzulukskaya Plain, on the bank of the Podpeshnoye Lake, 7 km north of Novoanninsky (the district's administrative centre) by road. Krasnokorotkovsky is the nearest rural locality.
