= Buranovo, Kalmansky District, Altai Krai =

Buranovo Бураново
- Village
- Location within Altai Krai Location within Russia
- Coordinates: 53°02′N 83°35′E
- Country: Russia
- Region: Altai Krai
- District: Kalmansky District
- Time zone: UTC+7:00

Buranovo (Russian: Бураново) is a rural locality (a selo) in Buranovsky Selsoviet of Kalmansky District, Altai Krai, Russia. The population was 1039 as of 2016. There are 9 streets.

== Geography ==
Buranovo is located on the bank of the Ob River, 18 km north of Kalmanka (the district's administrative centre) by road. Kalistratikha is the nearest rural locality.
