= Altai =

Altai or Altay may refer to:

== Places ==
- Altai Mountains, in Central and East Asia, a region shared by China, Mongolia, Kazakhstan and Russia

=== In China ===
- Altay Prefecture (阿勒泰地区), Xinjiang Uyghur Autonomous Region, China
- Altay City (阿勒泰市), also spelled "Aletai", a city of Altay Prefecture

=== In Kazakhstan ===
- Altai District, a District in East Kazakhstan Region, Kazakhstan, until 2019 known as Zyryan or Zyryanovsk
- Altai Town, a town in ltai District, East Kazakhstan Region, Kazakhstan, until 2019 known as Zyryan or Zyryanovsk

=== In Mongolia ===
- Altai City, capital of the Govi-Altai province
- Altai, Govi-Altai, a sum (district)
- Altai, Bayan-Ölgii, a sum
- Altai, Khovd, a sum

=== In Russia ===
- Altai Krai, a federal subject of Russia
  - Altay, Altay Krai, an administrative locality in Kalmansky District, Altai Krai, Russia
- Altai Republic, a federal subject of Russia

== People and languages ==
- Altay (name), a list of people with the given name or surname
- Altai people, an ethnic group
  - Altai languages, the languages spoken by these people

== Other uses ==
- Altai, a historical novel by Wu Ming
- Rupes Altai, a feature of the geography of the Moon
- Altay sheep, a sheep breed
- Altay S.K., a football club from İzmir, Turkey
- Altay S.K. (women's football), women's football team from İzmir, Turkey
- Altay (tank), a Turkish main battle tank
- Altay-class oiler, a Soviet Navy ship class
- Altai gas pipeline, a proposed natural gas pipeline between Russia and China
- Altai (mobile telephone system), a Soviet pre-cellular radiotelephone service
- Aletai meteorite, a very large meteorite which consists of several fragments found in the Altay Prefecture

== See also ==
- Altaysky (disambiguation)
- Alt-A, a type of U.S. mortgage
- Computer Associates International, Inc. v. Altai, Inc., a US legal case
