= Eurasian Poker Tour =

Poker tournaments in Eurasia

- Current season, competition or edition: 2026/2027
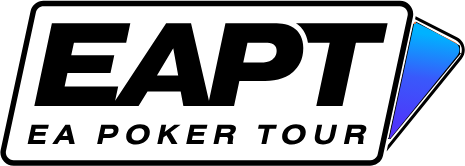
- Sport: Poker
- Founded: 2013
- Founder: Poker Club Management
- Director: Sergey Petin
- Region: Eurasian
- Most recent champion: (Russia) Pavel Tatarnikov (04/2026)
- Sponsor: GGPoker
- Website: https://eapokertour.com

The Eurasian Poker Tour (EA Poker Tour) is a tournament sponsored by GGPoker. EAPT is a series of festivals covering the entire Eurasian region. The EAPT has been hosting poker tournaments since 2013, which means 10 years of experience in providing top-notch poker experiences. Our festivals have a vast geography, from Kyiv in Ukraine to the Caribbean, from Cyprus to Kazakhstan, and from Montenegro to Altay.

== History ==
The EAPT started in Kyiv, Ukraine in September, 2013 and the team have organised 40 festivals and over 600 tournaments in 10 years history, more than 7,000 players have been participating in EAPT tournaments and over US$40,000,000 was distributed in prize money to the players.

Before establishing the EAPT, Poker Club Management organised several other poker tournaments, including the Red Sea Poker Cup in Egypt and the Mediterranean Poker Cup in Malta.

The EAPT was founded by Poker Club Management - PCM, held in Russia (Altay / Sochi), Georgia, Belarus, Montenegro, Ukraine, Cyprus and Kazakhstan every two months. PCM is the largest poker company in Eastern Europe and have distributed a total prize pool is over US$1,000,000,000 in more than 140 festivals since 2006.

== Results ==
=== Season 1 (2013) ===
Date/Venue	Event / City	Players	Prize Pool	Winner	Prize	Results
12–15 September; Khreshchatyk Club, Kyiv, Ukraine	(Ukraine) EAPT Kiev $2,000	160	$287,120	(Germany) Marvin Rettenmaier	$73,930	
21–24 November; Cashville Casino, Astana, Kazakhstan	EAPT Astana $1,500; Kazakhstan Poker Championship; Guaranteed prize pool $200,000	243	$333,101	(Russia) Alexander Dubrovskiy	$76,260	

=== Season 2 (2014) ===
Date/Venue	Event / City	Players	Prize Pool	Winner	Prize	Results
28–30 March; Cashville Casino, Astana, Kazakhstan	(Kazakhstan) EAPT Astana $2,150; Guaranteed prize pool $350,000	165	$339,500	(Russia) Vladimir Dobrovolskiy	$87,420	

=== Season 3 (2016) ===
Date/Venue	Event / City	Players	Prize Pool	Winner	Prize	Results
28–30 March; Princess Juravinka Casino, Minsk, Belarus	(Belarus) EAPT Minsk $1,000	92	$92,000	(Ukraine) Volodymyr Berezovskyi	$21,350	
22–25 April; Cashville Casino, Astana, Kazakhstan	(Kazakhstan) EAPT Astana $1,000; Guaranteed prize pool $100,000	150	$130,500	(Ukraine) Shklyar Iaroslav	$33,330	
22–25 July; Bombay Casino, Kapshagai, Kazakhstan	(Kazakhstan) EAPT Kapshagai $800; Guaranteed prize pool $90,000	147	$117,600	(Kazakhstan) Asan Umarov	$26,157	
13–16 October; Altai Palace Casino, Altay, Russia	(Russia) EAPT Altay $550	150	$75,000	(Russia) Anatoly Filatov	$16,590	

=== Season 4 (2017) ===
Date/Venue	Event / City	Players	Prize Pool	Winner	Prize	Results
27–31 January; Sochi Casino and Resort, Sochi, Russia	(Russia) EAPT Sochi €1,100	643	€559,410	(Russia) Sergey Chaptsev	€86,705	
17–22 February; Splendid Casino Royale, Bečići, Montenegro	EAPT Montenegro €1,100; Guaranteed prize pool €100,000	122	€108,282	(Czech Republic) Sucurija Lika	€26,217	
31 March-10 April; Altai Palace Casino, Altay, Russia	(Russia) EAPT Altay $550	104	$52.000	(Russia) Zakhar Serazudinov	$11,350	
16–24 April; Cashville Casino, Astana, Kazakhstan	(Kazakhstan) EAPT Astana $1,100; Guaranteed prize pool $100,000 presented by partypokerlive	164	$142,680	(Russia) Vyacheslav Nikulin	$34,730	
21–25 June; Splendid Casino Royale, Bečići, Montenegro	EAPT Montenegro €1,100; Guaranteed prize pool €500,000 presented by partypokerlive	437	€460,000	(Ukraine) Maksym Bidiuk	€91,155	
4–7 September; Sochi Casino and Resort, Sochi, Russia	EAPT Russia Grand Finale $1,100; Guaranteed prize pool $1,000,000 partypoker MILLIONS Russia	867	$1,000,000	(Russia) Roman Zhukov	$185,600	

=== Season 5 (2017-2018) ===
Date/Venue	Event / City	Players	Prize Pool	Winner	Prize	Results
10–14 October 2017; Cashville Casino, Astana, Kazakhstan	(Kazakhstan) EAPT Astana $1,100; Guaranteed prize pool $500,000 presented by partypokerlive	341	$500,000	(Russia) Kamil Isabekov	$68,320	
9–13 December 2017; Grandior Hotel Prague, Prague, Czech Republic	(Czech Republic) EAPT Prague €1,100; Guaranteed prize pool €500,000 presented by partypokerlive	825	€783,750	(Belgium) Jerome Sgorrano	€126,500	
4–13 February 2018; Sochi Casino and Resort, Sochi, Russia	(Russia) EAPT Sochi Snowfest ₽66,000 (~$1,066); Guaranteed prize ₽60,000,000 (~$1,000,000) presented by partypokerlive	928	₽60,000,000 (~$1,000,000)	(Russia) Andrey Litvinov	₽8,248,800 (~$146,538)	
24–30 June 2018; Opera Casino, Minsk, Belarus	(Belarus) EAPT Minsk $1,100; Guaranteed prize pool $250,000 presented by partypokerlive	231	$237,500	(Russia) Aleksandr Davydov	$53,025	
30 August-2 September 2018; Altai Palace Casino, Altay, Russia	(Russia) EAPT Altay ₽27,500 (~$405) presented by partypokerlive	239	₽5,700,000 (~$83,850)	(Russia) Alexander Flikov	₽1,007,750 (~$14,824)	
23–29 October 2018; Sochi Casino and Resort, Sochi, Russia	(Russia) EAPT Sochi Grand Finale ₽66,000 (~$919)	900	₽47,500,020 (~$727,026)	(Russia) Viktor Shegay	₽8,554,800 (~$130,938)	

- EurAsian Poker Tour - Season 2018 - Player of the Year: (Russia) Aleksandr Davydov

=== Season 6 (2019) ===
Date/Venue	Event / City	Players	Prize Pool	Winner	Prize	Results
11–14 April; Opera Casino, Minsk, Belarus	(Belarus) EAPT Minsk $750; Guaranteed prize pool $100,000 presented by partypokerlive	326	$202,545	(Ukraine) Oleksii Mykhailevych	$41,450	
19–23 June; Maestral Resort & Casino, Budva, Montenegro	EAPT Montenegro €1,100 presented by partypokerlive	236	€217,120	(Slovakia) Andrej Tekel	€49,605	
23 August-1 September; Altai Palace Casino, Altay, Russia	(Russia) EAPT Altay ₽27,500 (~$413) presented by partypokerlive	206	₽6,720,000 (~$100,896)	(Russia) Alexander Flikov	₽1,000,000 (~$15,014)	
25–30 November; Sochi Casino and Resort, Sochi, Russia	(Russia) EAPT Sochi Grand Finale ₽77,000 (~$1,207); Guaranteed prize pool ₽50,000 presented by partypokerlive	516	₽47,015,500 (~$736,750)	(Russia) Rudolf Domin	₽5,271,000 (~$82,599)	
partypoker Partnership
19-23 November; Baha Mar, New Providence, Bahamas	(The Bahamas) partypoker MILLIONS World Bahamas $10,300 Caribbean Poker Party; Guaranteed prize pool $10,000,000	948	$9,480,000	(Spain) Adrian Mateos	$1,162,805	

- EurAsian Poker Tour - Season 2019 - Player of the Year: (Russia) Ivan Soshnikov

=== Season 7 (2020) ===
Date/Venue	Event / City	Players	Prize Pool	Winner	Prize	Results
5–10 February; Opera Casino, Minsk, Belarus	(Belarus) EAPT Minsk $750; Guaranteed prize pool $200,000 presented by partypokerlive	282	$200,000	(Russia) Andrey Pateychuk	$38,200	
June; Maestral Resort & Casino, Budva, Montenegro	EAPT Montenegro €1,100 presented by partypokerlive	MOVE TO ONLINE Due to COVID-19				
June partypoker online	(Russia) EAPT ONLINE partypoker $330; Guaranteed prize pool $45,000	400+	$123,300	(Russia) Alexander Volkov	$22,983	
18–27 September; Altai Palace Casino, Altay, Russia	(Russia) EAPT Altay ₽38,500 (~$503) presented by partypokerlive	206	₽8,761,340 (~$114,478)	(Russia) Evgeniy Tambovtsev	₽892,990 (~$11,668)	
25–30 November; Sochi Casino and Resort, Sochi, Russia	(Russia) EAPT Sochi Grand Finale ₽77,000 (~$1,004); Guaranteed prize pool ₽50,000 presented by partypokerlive	455	₽30,257,500 (~$394,526)	(Russia) Anatoliy Zyrin	₽5,722,850 (~$74,614)	

=== Season 8 (2021) ===
Date/Venue	Event / City	Players	Prize Pool	Winner	Prize	Results
20–23 May; Altai Palace Casino, Altay, Russia	(Russia) EAPT Altay 1 ₽35,000 (~$476); Guaranteed prize pool ₽5,000,000 presented by partypokerlive	293	₽9,322,800 (~$126,640)	(Russia) Roman Kolotyuk	₽1,536,650 (~$20,874)	
23–26 September; Altai Palace Casino, Altay, Russia	(Russia) EAPT Altay 2 ₽37,600 (~$476); Guaranteed prize pool ₽5,000,000	187	₽6,333,200 (~$87,031)	(Belarus) Evgeniy Shikunov	₽991,250 (~$13,622)	
9 November-14 December; Sochi Casino and Resort, Sochi, Russia	(Russia) EAPT Sochi Grand Finale ₽77,000 (~$1,084)	598	₽39,767,000 (~$560,264)	(Russia) Artur Martirosyan	₽7,150,150 (~$100,736)	

=== Season 9 (2022-2023) ===
Date/Venue	Event / City	Players	Prize Pool	Winner	Prize	Results
18–27 March 2022; Sochi Casino and Resort, Sochi, Russia	(Russia) EAPT Sochi ₽105,000 (~$995)	415	₽37,615,410 (~$356,686)	(Russia) Alexander Kirichenko	₽6,807,360 (~$64,550)	
2–12 June 2022; Altai Palace Casino, Altay, Russia	(Russia) EAPT Altay ₽37,500 (~$618)	143	₽4,924,050 (~$81,132)	(Russia) Ian Ezerskii	₽1,211,300 (~$19,958)	
4–14 August 2022; Sochi Casino and Resort, Sochi, Russia	(Russia) EAPT Bounty Sochi ₽77,000 (~$1,263)	279	₽18,553,500* (~$324,326)	(Russia) Alexander Babayan	₽2,687,300* (~$46,976)	
22 August; 3 September 2022; Merit Royal Hotel & Casino, Kyrenia, Cyprus	EAPT Cyprus $1,100; Event #02 at Mediterranean Poker Party (MPP); Guaranteed prize pool $500,000	675	$621,000	(Russia) Eduard Barsegyan	$100,000	
22 August; 3 September 2022; Merit Royal Hotel & Casino, Kyrenia, Cyprus	MPP Cyprus $5,300; Luxon Pay Mediterranean Poker Party (MPP); Guaranteed prize pool $5,000,000	1,032	$4,747,200	(Germany) Hannes Jeschka	$542,000	
3–13 November 2022; Sochi Casino and Resort, Sochi, Russia	(Russia) EAPT Sochi Grand Finale ₽105,000 (~$1,729)	332	₽30,114,420 (~$495,871)	(Russia) Ravil Khamatgareev	₽6,153,770 (~$101,329)	
Extra Tournament
17–26 March 2023; Sochi Casino and Resort, Sochi, Russia	(Russia) EAPT Sochi ₽105,000 (~$1,361)	311	₽28,209,580 (~$365,562)	(Russia) Ivan Tukmachev	₽5,761,980 (~$74,668)	

- EAPT Bounty Sochi - total prize pool and winner prize with bounties

=== Season 10 (2023-2024) ===
Date/Venue	Event / City	Players	Prize Pool	Winner	Prize	Results
23–26 June 2023; King's Casino, Rozvadov, Czech Republic	(Czech Republic) EAPT Rozvadov €560; Guaranteed prize pool €350,000 + €50,000 Packages	596	€380,000	(Bosnia and Herzegovina) Bare Pele	€81,500	
15–17 July 2023; Imperium Room, Milan, Italy	(Italy) EAPT Milan €560; Guaranteed prize pool €270,000 + €30,000 Packages	632	€316,000	(Italy) Julio Anzelmo	€54,500	
5–8 October 2023; Casino Barcelona, Barcelona, Spain	(Spain) EAPT Barcelona €560; Guaranteed prize pool €200,000 + €20,000 Packages	357	€190,250	(Dominican Republic) Fernando Torrents	€26,625	
8–12 November 2023; 888 Poker Room, Bucharest, Romania	(Romania) EAPT Bucharest €560; Guaranteed prize pool €180,000 + €20,000 Packages	486	€223,560	(Romania) Ionut Voinea	€36,000	
24–28 January 2024; Banco Casino, Bratislava, Slovakia	(Slovakia) EAPT Bratislava €560; Guaranteed prize pool €180,000 + 4 EAPT Grand Final Packages (€5,000 each)	389	€180,000	(Hungary) Miklos Zsuffa	€32,630	
12–19 February 2024; Gran Via, Madrid, Spain	(Spain) EAPT Madrid €560; Guaranteed prize pool €180,000 + 4 EAPT Grand Final Packages (€5,000 each)	305	€180,000	(Spain) Antonio Puntas	€28,732	
5–10 April 2024; Portomaso Casino, St. Julian’s, Malta	EAPT Malta €560; Guaranteed prize pool €200,000 + 5 EAPT Grand Final Packages (€5,000 each)	660	€313,500	(Italy) Lorenzo Di Blasi	€50,225	
2-12 May 2024; Merit Royal Diamond Hotel & SPA, Kyrenia, Cyprus	EAPT Cyprus Grand Final €2,200; 4-8 May - EAPT Grand Final; Guaranteed prize pool €2,000,000	1,565	€3,004,800	(Bulgaria) Boris Kolev	€437,000	
2-12 May 2024; Merit Royal Diamond Hotel & SPA, Kyrenia, Cyprus	MPP Cyprus €5,300; 7-12 May - Mediterranean Poker Party (MPP); Guaranteed prize pool €5,000,000	1,260	€6,048,000	(Russia) Azamat Lamkov	€1,000,000	
2-12 May 2024; Merit Royal Diamond Hotel & SPA, Kyrenia, Cyprus	EAPT Cyprus €1,100; 10-12 May - EAPT Cyprus; Guaranteed prize pool €500,000	885	€840,750	(Russia) Denis Zelenkin	€139,000	

=== Season 11 (2024/2025) ===
Date/Venue	Event / City	Players	Prize Pool	Winner	Prize	Results
17–27 May 2024; Dusk Till Dawn, Nottingham, UK	(United Kingdom) EAPT UK £560; Guaranteed prize pool £500,000	858	£500,000	(England) Ali Ayub	£67,400	
7-15 September 2024; Eclipse Poker Club at Eclipse Casino, Batumi, Georgia	(Georgia (country)) EAPT Georgia $500; Guaranteed prize pool $140,000	741	$370,500	(Armenia) Hayk Manasyan	$53,880	
19-25 November 2024; King's Casino, Rozvadov, Czech Republic	(Czech Republic) EAPT Rozvadov €500; Guaranteed Prizepool €250,000	336	€250,000	(Ukraine) Vasyl Vorynka	€52,350	
14-22 December 2024; 888 Poker Room; Bucharest, Romania	(Romania) EAPT Bucharest €500; Guaranteed Prizepool €184,000	421	€189,450	(Romania) Marian Virlanuta	€26,700	
1-13 April 2025; Eclipse Poker Club at Eclipse Casino, Batumi, Georgia	(Georgia (country)) EAPT Georgia $600; Guaranteed prize pool $300,000	811	$477,720	(Ukraine) Illia Filonenko	$75,970	
3-13 May 2025; Merit Royal Diamond Hotel & SPA, Kyrenia, Cyprus	(Cyprus) Luxon Pay Grand Final $2,200; EAPT Grand Final; Guaranteed prize pool $2,000,000	1,452	$2,787,840	(Russia) Ivan Bryksin	$375,000	
3-13 May 2025; Merit Royal Diamond Hotel & SPA, Kyrenia, Cyprus	MPP Cyprus $5,300; Mediterranean Poker Party (MPP); Guaranteed prize pool $5,000,000	1,196	$5,740,800	(England) Daniel Thaller	$786,670	
3-13 May 2025; Merit Royal Diamond Hotel & SPA, Kyrenia, Cyprus	EAPT Cyprus $1,100; EAPT Cyprus Main Event; Guaranteed prize pool $500,000	797	$765,120	(Georgia (country)) Giorgiy Skhuluhiya	$120,000	

=== Season 12 (2025/2026) ===
Date/Venue	Event / City	Players	Prize Pool	Winner	Prize	Results
30 Sep-8 Oct. 2025; Eclipse Poker Club at Eclipse Casino, Batumi, Georgia	(Georgia (country)) EAPT Georgia $600; Guaranteed prize pool $300,000	1,074	$644,280	(Russia) Evgenii Kim	$68,340	
24 Nov-8 Dec. 2025; Imperium Room, Milan, Italy	(Italy) EAPT Milan €500; Guaranteed prize pool €350,000	1,339	€350,000	(Italy) Bognanni Marco	€54,365	
5-14 Dec. 2025; Shangri La Casino, Armenia	EAPT Armenia $600; Guaranteed prize pool $200,000	666	253,716.80 CU (~$329,832)	(Armenia) Evgenii Ilin	41,367 CU (~$53,777)	
8-15 Mar. 2026; Merit Park Hotel, Cyprus	EAPT Cyprus $2,200; Guaranteed prize pool $500,000	462	$924,000	(Poland) Michal Anzulewicz	$161,500	
3-12 Apr. 2026; Eclipse Poker Club at Eclipse Casino, Batumi, Georgia	(Georgia (country)) EAPT Georgia $1,250; Guaranteed prize pool $350,000	569	$711,250	(Russia) Pavel Tatarnikov	$93,350	

=== Season 13 (2026/2027) ===
Date/Venue	Event / City	Players	Prize Pool	Winner	Prize	Results
2-11 Oct. 2026; Eclipse Poker Club at Eclipse Casino, Batumi, Georgia	(Georgia (country)) EAPT Georgia $1,000	615	$615,200	(Georgia (country)) Avtandil Magradze	$94,500	
18-29 November 2026; Poker Club, Sochi, Russia	(Russia) EAPT Sochi ₽165,000					

== Winners by country ==
Place	Country	Times
1st	Russia	30
2nd	Ukraine	6
3rd	Italy	3
4th	Armenia	2
	Romania	2
6th	Belarus	1
	Belgium	1
	Bosnia	1
	Bulgaria	1
	Czech Republic	1
	Dominican Republic	1
	England	1
	Georgia	1
	Germany	1
	Hungary	1
	Kazakhstan	1
	Poland	1
	Slovakia	1
	Spain	1
		57

Up to Season 12 (2025/2026) EAPT Georgia (April 2026);
Only EAPT events, MPP tournaments are not counted;
In case of a tie, alphabetical order.
