= Panfilovo, Altai Krai =

Panfilovo Панфилово
- Selo
- Location within Altai Krai Location within Russia
- Coordinates: 53°08′N 83°21′E
- Country: Russia
- Region: Altai Krai
- District: Kalmansky District
- Time zone: UTC+7:00

Panfilovo (Russian: Панфилово) is a rural locality (a selo) in Novoromanovsky Selsoviet, Kalmansky District, Altai Krai, Russia. The population was 329 as of 2013. There are 6 streets.

== Geography ==
Panfilovo is located 35 km northwest of Kalmanka (the district's administrative centre) by road. Novoromanovo is the nearest rural locality.
