= Budyonnovsky =

Budyonnovsky (masculine), Budyonnovskaya (feminine), or Budyonnovskoye (neuter) may refer to:

- Budyonnovsky District, a district of Stavropol Krai, Russia
- Budyonnovsky (rural locality) (Budyonnovskaya, Budyonnovskoye), the name of several rural localities in Russia
