= Trostyanka =

Trostyanka Тростянка
- Selo
- Location within Volgograd Oblast Location within Russia
- Coordinates: 50°48′N 43°27′E
- Country: Russia
- Region: Volgograd Oblast
- District: Yelansky District
- Time zone: UTC+4:00

Trostyanka (Russian: Тростянка) is a rural locality (a selo) and the administrative center of Trostyanskoye Rural Settlement, Yelansky District, Volgograd Oblast, Russia. The population was 551 in 2010. There are six streets.

== Geography ==
Trostyanka is located on Khopyorsko-Buzulukskaya Plain, on the right bank of the Buzuluk River, 26 km southwest of Yelan (the district's administrative centre) by road. Rovinsky is the nearest rural locality.
