= Martynovsky, Volgograd Oblast =

Martynovsky Мартыновский
- Khutor
- Location within Volgograd Oblast Location within Russia
- Coordinates: 50°29′N 42°17′E
- Country: Russia
- Region: Volgograd Oblast
- District: Novoanninsky District
- Time zone: UTC+4:00

Martynovsky (Russian: Мартыновский) is a rural locality (a khutor) in Deminskoye Rural Settlement, Novoanninsky District, Volgograd Oblast, Russia. The population was 293 as of 2010. There are 5 streets.

== Geography ==
Martynovsky is located in steppe on the Khopyorsko-Buzulukskaya Plain, on the right bank of the Buzuluk River, 43 km west of Novoanninsky (the district's administrative centre) by road. Tavolzhansky is the nearest rural locality.
