= Talovsky =

Talovsky (masculine), Talovskaya (feminine), or Talovskoye (neuter) may refer to:

- Talovsky District, a district of Voronezh Oblast, Russia
- Talovsky (rural locality), a rural locality (a khutor) in Volgograd Oblast, Russia
- Talovskoye, a rural locality (a selo) in Omsk Oblast, Russia
