= Saidov =

Saidov or Sayidov (Russian: Саидов) "son of Sa‘id", may refer to:

- Akmal Saidov (born 1958) Uzbekistani lawyer, statesman and politician
- Altay Saidov (1926–2015) Azerbaijani scenic painter
- Kamil Saidov (born 1989) Tajikistani footballer
- Shamil Saidov (born 1982) is a Russian professional football player
- Ramziddin Sayidov (born 1982) Uzbekistani judoka
- Rustam Saidov (born 1978) boxer from Uzbekistan
- Zayd Saidov (born 1958) a businessman and politician from Tajikistan

== See also ==
- Saitov - surname
