= Altaysky =

Altaysky (masculine), Altayskaya (feminine), or Altayskoye (neuter) may refer to:

- Altai Krai (Altaysky Krai), a federal subject of Russia
- Altaysky District, name of several districts in Russia
- Altaysky (rural locality) (Altayskaya, Altayskoye), name of several rural localities in Russia

== See also ==
- Altay (disambiguation)
