= Talovsky (rural locality) =

Talovsky Таловский
- Khutor
- Location within Volgograd Oblast Location within Russia
- Coordinates: 50°26′N 43°08′E
- Country: Russia
- Region: Volgograd Oblast
- District: Novoanninsky District
- Time zone: UTC+4:00

Talovsky (Russian: Таловский) is a rural locality (a khutor) in Novokiyevskoye Rural Settlement, Novoanninsky District, Volgograd Oblast, Russia. The population was 10 as of 2010.

== Geography ==
Talovsky is located in forest steppe on the Khopyorsko-Buzulukskaya Plain, 49 km southeast of Novoanninsky (the district's administrative centre) by road. Novokiyevka is the nearest rural locality.
