= Martynovsky =

Martynovsky (masculine), Martynovskaya (feminine), or Martynovskoye (neuter) may refer to:

- Martynovsky District, a district of Rostov Oblast, Russia
- Martynovsky (rural locality) (Martynovskaya, Martynovskoye), name of several rural localities in Russia
