= Panfilovo, Volgograd Oblast =

Panfilovo Панфилово
- Settlement
- Location within Volgograd Oblast Location within Russia
- Coordinates: 50°24′N 42°53′E
- Country: Russia
- Region: Volgograd Oblast
- District: Novoanninsky District
- Time zone: UTC+4:00

Panfilovo (Russian: Панфилово) is a rural locality (a settlement) and the administrative center of Panfilovskoye Rural Settlement, Novoanninsky District, Volgograd Oblast, in southern Russia. The population was 1,797 as of 2010. There are 27 streets.

== Geography ==
Panfilovo is located in a steppe on the Khopyorsko-Buzulukskaya Plain, 30 km southeast of Novoanninsky (the district's administrative centre) by road. Krasnaya Zarya is the nearest rural locality.
