= Altay, Altay Krai =

Altay Алтай
- Settlement
- Location within Altai Krai Location within Russia
- Coordinates: 53°00′N 83°22′E
- Country: Russia
- Region: Altai Krai
- District: Kalmansky District
- Time zone: UTC+7:00

Altay (Russian: Алтай) is a rural locality (a settlement) and the administrative center of Obsky Selsoviet of Kalmansky District, Altai Krai, Russia. The population was 883 as of 2016. There are 13 streets.

== Geography ==
Altay is located on the right bank of the Marushka River, 23 km northwest of Kalmanka (the district's administrative centre) by road. Alexandrovka is the nearest rural locality.

== Ethnicity ==
The settlement is inhabited by Russians and others.
