= Shadrino, Kalmansky District, Altai Krai =

Shadrino Шадрино
- Village
- Location within Altai Krai Location within Russia
- Coordinates: 53°06′N 83°37′E
- Country: Russia
- Region: Altai Krai
- District: Kalmansky District
- Time zone: UTC+7:00

Shadrino (Russian: Шадрино) is a rural locality (a selo) and the administrative center of Shadrinsky Selsoviet of Kalmansky District, Altai Krai, Russia. The population was 659 as of 2016. There are nine streets.

== Geography ==
Shadrino is located on the bank of the Shadrinka River, 26 km (16 mi) north of Kalmanka (the district's administrative centre) by road. Buranovo is the nearest rural locality.

== Ethnicity ==
The village is inhabited by Russians and others.
