= Alexander Pavlenko =

Russian rapist, murderer, and suspected serial killer

- Born: Alexander Ivanovich Pavlenko; 28 March 1971 (age 55); Barnaul, Altai Krai, RSFSR
- Other names: "The Maniac Policeman" "The Barnaul Ripper"
- Conviction: Murder
- Penalty: 24 years imprisonment (reduced to 13 years in 2012)

Details
- Victims: 2–4+
- Span of crimes: 1991–2001
- Country: Soviet Union, later Russia
- State: Altai
- Date apprehended: March 2001

Alexander Ivanovich Pavlenko (Russian: Александр Иванович Павленко; born 28 March 1971), known as The Maniac Policeman (Russian: Маньяк-милиционер), is a Russian rapist, murderer and suspected serial killer.

== Biography ==
From 1 August 1992, Pavlenko worked as a junior investigator of the Leninsky District Department of Internal Affairs of Barnaul, later beginning to work as a driver for a medical centre in the Oktyabrsky District Department of Internal Affairs. From 1999, Pavlenko lured victims into his apartment, raping them and filming it for his porno album. Subsequently, the girls declared that he was obsessed with sexual sadism, and were afraid to tell the militsiya anything.

In 2000 Pavlenko nearly got caught, when a girl raped by him wrote an application to the police. His colleagues, defending the "honour of the uniform", did not stir up the case. Pavlenko also escaped dismissal and conviction because he gave the girl a bribe of 5000 rubles, and she took the application.

Refusing to turn in the killer, death soon followed. At the end of 2000, Pavlenko brutally dealt with two girls, whom he had taken to his apartment. After they refused his sexual advances, he struck them with a knife and then an axe, killing both of them. Pavlenko then dismembered their bodies in his bathroom, packing the body parts in bags, putting them in the trunk of his car and disposing of them in the Ob River near the village of Gongba, where he has loved to swim since childhood. Although the body parts were disposed of, they were soon discovered and quickly identified. In addition to the double murder, Pavlenko was charged with the murder of two other girls.

== Arrest and trial ==
Pavlenko was arrested after a victim of his jumped out the window, breaking her leg, and later gave a witness statement on the rape while in the hospital. In his apartment, a large amount of women's underwear, blood traces, hacksaws, knives, needles, tongs, handcuffs, axes, several albums and about 20 negative films with pornographic material were found during the search. After his detention, Pavlenko was questioned about other murders. Over the past summer in Barnaul, five abiturs of the Altai State Technical University had disappeared. Soon, on suspicion of committing the murders, a market trader named Alexander Anisimov was detained, he soon confessed to everything. However, Anisimov threw himself out the window during the investigative experiment, and the case remains open.

At his trial Pavlenko retracted all the previous testimonies, arguing that investigators of the prosecutor's office had beaten him into confessing. However, such a statement was refuted by the fact that after each interrogation he had undergone a medical examination. The Altai Regional Court sentenced former senior police sergeant Alexander Pavlenko to 24 years in prison on 22 November 2001, the first five of which he would serve in a normal prison, and the rest in a strict-regime colony. The Supreme Court of Russia upheld the verdict without change.

== Case aftermath ==
Subsequently, the verdict was annulled by the Supreme Court of Russia on the recommendation of the European Court of Human Rights. On 1 November 2011, the Altai Regional Court issued a new conviction, to which Pavlenko was sentenced to 13 years imprisonment and 4 months. In January 2012, the Supreme Court of Russia again reversed the verdict and sent the criminal case for a new trial. On the charges of killing two girls and committing sexual acts against one of them, Pavlenko was acquitted. In connection to the case's revision, his sentence was reduced to 13 years and expired in February 2014.

In connection to the case of the "Maniac Policeman", which received a great public response in Barnaul, cleansing of the ranks of law enforcement agencies was carried out. Pavlenko was dismissed, but later the prosecutor of the Zheleznodorozhny District, Petr Gossen, was reinstated.

== See also ==
- Vitaly Manishin
- List of Russian serial killers

== In the media ==
- Documentary film "Beauties and monsters" (second part) from the series "Criminal Russia" (2005)
