= Altaysky (rural locality) =

Altaysky (Russian: Алта́йский; masculine), Altayskaya (Алта́йская; feminine), or Altayskoye (Алта́йское; neuter) is the name of several rural localities in Russia:

- Altayskoye, Altaysky District, Altai Krai, a selo in Altaysky District of Altai Krai
- Altayskoye, Tabunsky District, Altai Krai, a selo in Tabunsky District of Altai Krai
