= Saitov =

Saitov may refer to:

- Asiat Saitov (Asjat, Asyat; born 1965), Russian professional road racing cyclist; married to athlete Svetlana Masterkova (from 1994)
- Boris Vladimirovich Saitov (1897–1942), Russian musicologist and bibliographer; son of Vladimir Saitov
- Oleg Saitov (born 1974), Russian boxer
- Viktor Petrovich Saitov (1941–2007), Soviet and Russian theatre actor (Perm Academic Theatre), People's Artist of the RSFSR, State Prize of the Moldova Winner
- Vladimir Ivanovich Saitov (1849–1938), Russian historian of Russian literature, bibliographer, Corresponding Member of the Academy of Sciences of the USSR

== See also ==
- Saidov - surname
