= Alexey Ryzhkov =

Russian serial killer (born 1972)

- Алексей Рыжков
- Born: Alexey Vladimirovich Ryzhkov; 20 December 1972 (age 53)
- Other names: "Altai Maniac" "The Rubtsovsk Ripper"
- Years active: 2000–2001
- Convictions: Murder (x5); Rape; Robbery (x2); Fraud
- Penalty: Life imprisonment

Details
- Victims: 5
- Country: Russia
- State: Altai Krai
- Date apprehended: January 2001

Alexey Vladimirovich Ryzhkov (Russian:Алексей Владимирович Рыжков; born 20 December 1972), known as the Rubtsovsk Ripper, is a Russian serial killer who raped and murdered four women and a teenage girl in Rubtsovsk, Russia, between 2000 and 2001. He was caught by police shortly after murdering his last victim, and subsequently sentenced to life imprisonment.

== Early life ==
At an early age, Ryzhkov was diagnosed with a learning disability. Because of this, he was held back several times, which led to his classmates bullying him and his teachers mocking him. After sixth grade, Ryzhkov dropped out of school and later committed two robberies. He was released from prison when he was 27-years-old. Shortly afterwards, he was arrested again for fraud, but released in August 2000.

== Murders ==
In November 2000, Ryzhkov murdered "Natalya," who was walking to her friend's house. Her corpse was found between two outbuildings. She had been raped and strangled to death. The body of his second victim was discovered in an elevator shaft. The third victim was a 60-year-old woman. In December 2000, Ryzhkov murdered a 16-year-old girl. After volunteering to walk her home, he raped and strangled her to death. On 16 January 2001, he murdered a prostitute after drinking moonshine. He then raped her body several times at the entrance of an apartment building. A witness saw Ryzhkov with the victim at his feet, but Ryzhkov claimed it was his drunk wife.

== Arrest and convictions ==
Ryzhkov was initially interviewed as a witness because one of his victims was his neighbour. When investigators interviewed other witnesses, they claimed to have seen a tall young man close to where the murders occurred. Due to these witness testimonies, suspicion fell on Ryzhkov. During the interrogation, Ryzhkov confessed to the murders. It's important to note that investigators also questioned him about other murders in Barnaul; however, he was in prison at the time those murders took place. Additionally, Ryzhkov cooperated with the police by revealing the location where he had hidden the body of one of his victims. This particular victim had been reported missing during that period. Furthermore, some of the victim's belongings, including gold earrings and clothing, were discovered in the possession of a distant relative of Ryzhkov.

On 4 September 2001, Ryzhkov was found guilty and sentenced to life imprisonment. He was reportedly calm as the verdict was being read, and said he didn't intend to appeal it.

== See also ==
- Crime in Russia
- List of Russian serial killers
