= Altaysky District =

Location of Altai Krai in Russia

Location of the Republic of Khakassia in Russia

Altaysky District is the name of several administrative and municipal districts in Russia. The districts are named after the Altai Mountains.

- Altaysky District, Altai Krai, an administrative and municipal district of Altai Krai
- Altaysky District, Republic of Khakassia, an administrative and municipal district of the Republic of Khakassia

== See also ==
- Altaysky (disambiguation)
