= Shilovo, Kichmengsko-Gorodetsky District, Vologda Oblast =

Shilovo Шилово
- Village
- Location within Vologda Oblast Location within Russia
- Coordinates: 59°55′N 45°30′E
- Country: Russia
- Region: Vologda Oblast
- District: Kichmengsko-Gorodetsky District
- Time zone: UTC+3:00

Shilovo (Russian: Шилово) is a rural locality (a village) in Gorodetskoye Rural Settlement, Kichmengsko-Gorodetsky District, Vologda Oblast, Russia. The population was 38 as of 2002.

== Geography ==
Shilovo is located 20 km southwest of Kichmengsky Gorodok (the district's administrative centre) by road. Savino is the nearest rural locality.
