= Shilovo, Vologodsky District, Vologda Oblast =

Shilovo Шилово
- Village
- Location within Vologda Oblast Location within Russia
- Coordinates: 59°32′N 39°30′E
- Country: Russia
- Region: Vologda Oblast
- District: Vologodsky District
- Time zone: UTC+3:00

Shilovo (Russian: Шилово) is a rural locality (a village) in Kubenskoye Rural Settlement, Vologodsky District, Vologda Oblast, Russia. The population was 4 as of 2002.

== Geography ==
Shilovo is located 45 km northwest of Vologda (the district's administrative centre) by road. Sarayevo is the nearest rural locality.
