= Martynovskaya, Verkhovazhsky District, Vologda Oblast =

Martynovskaya Мартыновская
- Village
- Location within Vologda Oblast Location within Russia
- Coordinates: 60°49′N 42°06′E
- Country: Russia
- Region: Vologda Oblast
- District: Verkhovazhsky District
- Time zone: UTC+3:00

Martynovskaya (Russian: Мартыновская) is a rural locality (a village) in Nizhne-Vazhskoye Rural Settlement, Verkhovazhsky District, Vologda Oblast, Russia. The population was 16 as of 2002.

== Geography ==
Martynovskaya is located 11 km northeast of Verkhovazhye (the district's administrative centre) by road. Petrovskaya is the nearest rural locality.
