= Martynovskaya, Nyuksensky District, Vologda Oblast =

Martynovskaya Мартыновская
- Village
- Location within Vologda Oblast Location within Russia
- Coordinates: 60°29′N 44°06′E
- Country: Russia
- Region: Vologda Oblast
- District: Nyuksensky District
- Time zone: UTC+3:00

Martynovskaya (Russian: Мартыновская) is a rural locality (a village) in Nyuksenskoye Rural Settlement, Nyuksensky District, Vologda Oblast, Russia. The population was 20 as of 2002.

== Geography ==
Martynovskaya is located 15 km northwest of Nyuksenitsa (the district's administrative centre) by road. Semenova Gora is the nearest rural locality.
