= Budennovsky, Republic of Bashkortostan =

Budennovsky Будённовский
- Village
- Location within Bashkortostan Location within Russia
- Coordinates: 54°44′N 56°32′E
- Country: Russia
- Region: Bashkortostan
- District: Iglinsky District
- Time zone: UTC+5:00

Budennovsky (Russian: Будённовский) is a rural locality (a village) in Baltiysky Selsoviet, Iglinsky District, Bashkortostan, Russia. The population was 192 as of 2010. There are 5 streets.

== Geography ==
Budennovsky is located 23 km southeast of Iglino (the district's administrative centre) by road. Baltika is the nearest rural locality.
