= Martynovskaya, Totemsky District, Vologda Oblast =

Martynovskaya Мартыновская
- Village
- Location within Vologda Oblast Location within Russia
- Coordinates: 60°14′N 42°09′E
- Country: Russia
- Region: Vologda Oblast
- District: Totemsky District
- Time zone: UTC+3:00

Martynovskaya (Russian: Мартыновская) is a rural locality (a village) in Moseyevskoye Rural Settlement, Totemsky District, Vologda Oblast, Russia. The population was 5 as of 2002.

== Geography ==
Martynovskaya is located 61 km northwest of Totma (the district's administrative centre) by road. Danilov Pochinok is the nearest rural locality.
