= Altay Saidov =

Azerbaijani scenic painter (1926–2015)

Altay Saidov Altay Səidov
- Born: July 11, 1926; Baku, Baku uezd, Azerbaijan SSR, USSR
- Died: September 10, 2015 (aged 89)
- Education: Azim Azimzade Azerbaijan State Art School; Leningrad Institute of Painting, Sculpture and Architecture
- Awards: Honored Artist of Azerbaijan SSR

Altay Aghasaid oghlu Saidov (Azerbaijani: Altay Ağasəid oğlu Səidov, July 11, 1926 – September 10, 2015) was an Azerbaijani scenic painter.

== Biography ==
Altay Saidov was born on July 11, 1926, in Baku. In 1943–1946, he studied at the Azim Azimzade Azerbaijan State Art School, and in 1948–1953 at the Leningrad Institute of Painting, Sculpture and Architecture.

On October 29, 1953, he was hired as a set designer at the Azerbaijan State Theatre of Young Spectators, and from 1967, he worked as a chief artist in this collective. He also provided stage design for performances at the Azerbaijan State Academic Theatre of Musical Comedy by invitation.

Saidov died on September 10, 2015.

== Awards ==
- Lenin Komsomol Prize of the Azerbaijan SSR — 1967
- Honored Artist of the Azerbaijan SSR — February 9, 1979
- Individual scholarship of the President of the Republic of Azerbaijan — April 1, 2005

== Sources ==
- İlham Rəhimli (2016). Azərbaycan Teatr Ensiklopediyası (3 cilddə). 1-ci cild. Bakı: Azərnəşr. pp. 428 səh.
- "Azərbaycanın mədəniyyət təqvimi" (Elektron kataloq). Bakı: Azərbaycan Respublikası Mədəniyyət Nazirliyi. 2019. pp. 510 səh.
