= Shadrino, Amur Oblast =

Shadrino Шадрино
- Selo
- Location within Amur Oblast Location within Russia
- Coordinates: 49°35′N 128°50′E
- Country: Russia
- Region: Amur Oblast
- District: Mikhaylovsky District
- Time zone: UTC+9:00

Shadrino (Russian: Шадрино) is a rural locality (a selo) in Chesnokovsky Selsoviet of Mikhaylovsky District, Amur Oblast, Russia. The population was 205 as of 2018. There are 6 streets.

== Geography ==
Shadrino is located on the left bank of the Chesnokova River, 15 km southeast of Poyarkovo (the district's administrative centre) by road. Chesnokovo is the nearest rural locality.
