= Panfilovo, Gryazovetsky District, Vologda Oblast =

Panfilovo Панфилово
- Village
- Location within Vologda Oblast Location within Russia
- Coordinates: 58°58′N 39°52′E
- Country: Russia
- Region: Vologda Oblast
- District: Gryazovetsky District
- Time zone: UTC+3:00

Panfilovo (Russian: Панфилово) is a rural locality (a village) in Yurovskoye Rural Settlement, Gryazovetsky District, Vologda Oblast, Russia. The population was 254 as of 2002.

== Geography ==
Panfilovo is located 28 km northwest of Gryazovets (the district's administrative centre) by road. Neverovo is the nearest rural locality.
