= Zelyonaya Dubrava, Rodinsky District, Altai Krai =

Zelyonaya Dubrava Зелёная Дубрава
- Settlement
- Location within Altai Krai Location within Russia
- Coordinates: 52°29′N 80°35′E
- Country: Russia
- Region: Altai Krai
- District: Rodinsky District
- Time zone: UTC+7:00

Zelyonaya Dubrava (Russian: Зелёная Дубрава) is a rural locality (a settlement) in Kayaushinsky Selsoviet, Rodinsky District, Altai Krai, Russia. The population was 264 as of 2013. There are 5 streets.

== Geography ==
Zelyonaya Dubrava is located 30 km east of Rodino (the district's administrative centre) by road. Kochki is the nearest rural locality.
