= Altay Öktem =

Altay Öktem (born 1964 in Istanbul) is a Turkish poet, writer, researcher and doctor.

He studied at Kuleli Military High School and then medicine at Trakya University. He later devoted himself to poetry. In February 2002, he held a fanzine exhibit at Kargart (Kadıköy). He has written in several magazines such as Yasakmeyve, Hayvan, Penguen, Öküz and Roll and he has participated in several panels, seminars and speeches about subculture, counterculture and underground culture at various universities. He still practices medicine. He is married and has a son.

== Works ==
- Poetry – Eski Bir Çocuk, Sukuşu, Beni Yanlış Öptüler, Çamur Şiir ve Herşey: Oda Kırbaç Ayna, Sokaklar Tekin Değil, Dört Kırıtık Opera, Parça Tesirli
- A study on the fanzines, photocopied posters and demos – Şeytan Aletleri
- Novels – Filler Çapraz Gider, Tanrı Acıkınca, Sonsuz Sıkıntı, Bu Kitaptan Kimse Sağ Çıkmayacak
- Reader – Genel Kültürden Kenar Kültüre: 101 Fanzin
- Essays – Hayat Bazen Çentiklidir, Yaram Yanlış Yerde, Sık Rastlanan Hastalıklar Atlası
- Research/essays – İçimde Bir Boşluk Var
- Memoir/research – Anadolu Yakasının Sıfır Noktası: Bağlarbaşı – İstanbulum 42
- Story – Aslında Saçları Siyahtı
- Fanzine poetry anthology – Şehrin Kötü Çocukları
- Children’s book – Çalılar Dünyası
