= Panfilovo, Sheksninsky District, Vologda Oblast =

Panfilovo Панфилово
- Village
- Location within Vologda Oblast Location within Russia
- Coordinates: 59°01′N 38°28′E
- Country: Russia
- Region: Vologda Oblast
- District: Sheksninsky District
- Time zone: UTC+3:00

Panfilovo (Russian: Панфилово) is a rural locality (a village) in Yurochenskoye Rural Settlement, Sheksninsky District, Vologda Oblast, Russia. The population was 7 as of 2002.

== Geography ==
Panfilovo is located 36 km south of Sheksna (the district's administrative centre) by road. Khanevo is the nearest rural locality.
