= Buzuluk (inhabited locality) =

Buzuluk (Russian: Бузулук) is the name of several inhabited localities in Russia.

Urban localities

- Buzuluk, Orenburg Oblast, a town in Orenburg Oblast

Rural localities

- Buzuluk, Irkutsk Oblast, a settlement in Kuytunsky District of Irkutsk Oblast
- Buzuluk, Oryol Oblast, a village in Podgorodnensky Selsoviet of Maloarkhangelsky District of Oryol Oblast
