= Shilovskoye, Vladimir Oblast =

Shilovskoye Шиловское
- Village
- Location within Vladimir Oblast Location within Russia
- Coordinates: 56°15′N 41°27′E
- Country: Russia
- Region: Vladimir Oblast
- District: Kovrovsky District
- Time zone: UTC+3:00

Shilovskoye (Russian: Шиловское) is a rural locality (a village) in Ivanovskoye Rural Settlement, Kovrovsky District, Vladimir Oblast, Russia. The population was 14 as of 2010.

== Geography ==
Shilovskoye is located 32 km southeast of Kovrov (the district's administrative centre) by road. Novinki is the nearest rural locality.
