= Shilovskaya, Velsky District, Arkhangelsk Oblast =

Shilovskaya Шиловская
- Village
- Location within Arkhangelsk Oblast Location within Russia
- Coordinates: 61°00′N 42°02′E
- Country: Russia
- Region: Arkhangelsk Oblast
- District: Velsky District
- Time zone: UTC+3:00

Shilovskaya (Russian: Шиловская) is a rural locality (a village) in Ust-Velskoye Rural Settlement of Velsky District, Arkhangelsk Oblast, Russia. The population was 405 as of 2014. There is 1 street.

== Geography ==
Shilovskaya is located on the Pezhma River, 7 km southwest of Velsk (the district's administrative centre) by road. Pogorelovskaya is the nearest rural locality.
