= Panfilovo, Petushinsky District, Vladimir Oblast =

Panfilovo Панфилово
- Village
- Location within Vladimir Oblast Location within Russia
- Coordinates: 55°59′N 39°04′E
- Country: Russia
- Region: Vladimir Oblast
- District: Petushinsky District
- Time zone: UTC+3:00

Panfilovo (Russian: Панфилово) is a rural locality (a village) in Nagornoye Rural Settlement, Petushinsky District, Vladimir Oblast, Russia. The population was 131 as of 2010. There are 6 streets.

== Geography ==
Panfilovo is located on the Sheredar River, 32 km northwest of Petushki (the district's administrative centre) by road. Zabolotye is the nearest rural locality.
