= Azim Azimzade Azerbaijan State Art School =

Art school in Baku, Azerbaijan

- Əzim Əzimzadə adına Azərbaycan Dövlət Rəssamlıq Məktəbi
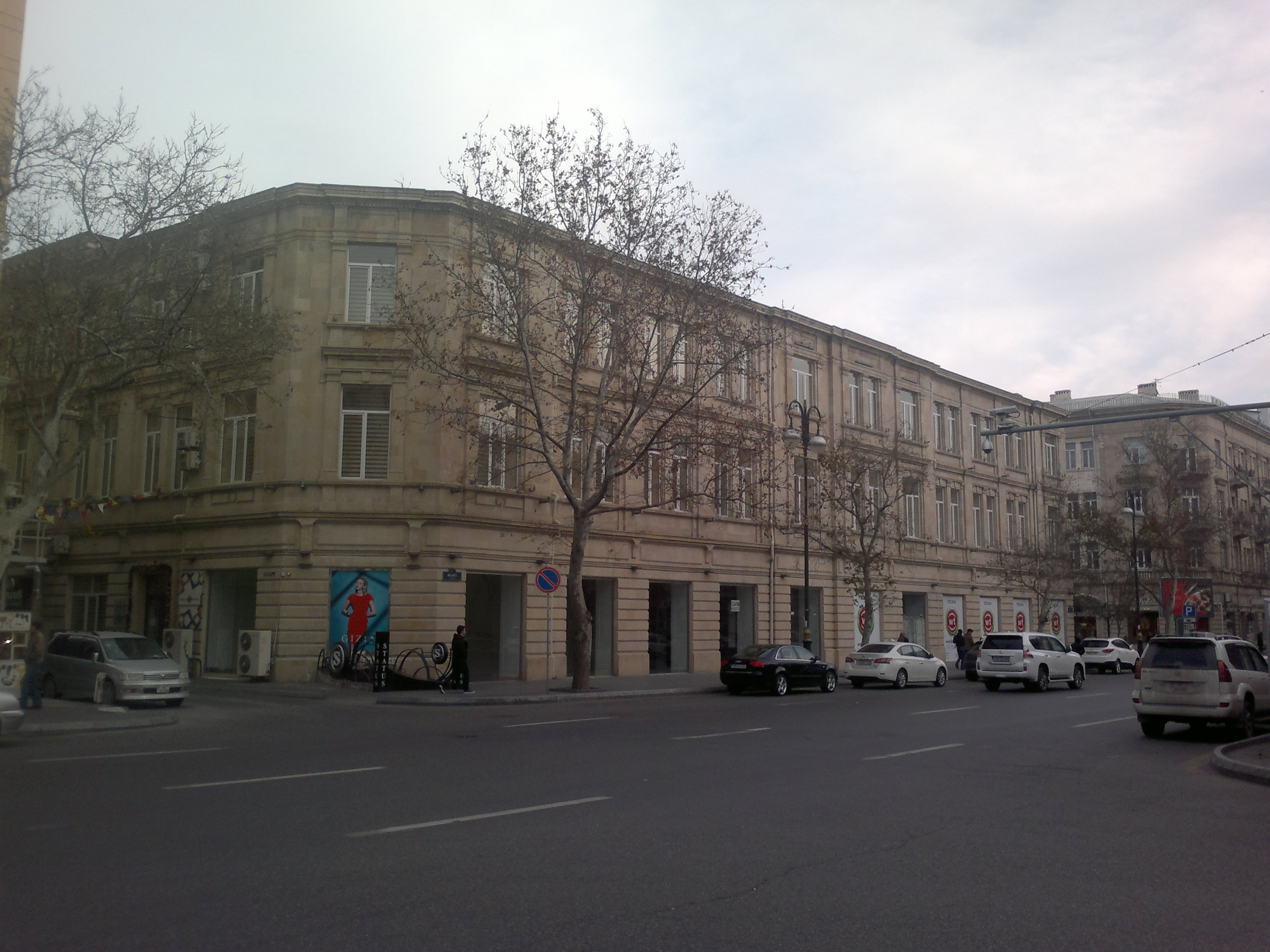
- Type: Public
- Established: 1920
- Location: Baku, Azerbaijan
- Campus: Urban

Azim Azimzade Azerbaijan State Art School is a secondary specialized art school that operated in Baku. It was the first art school in Azerbaijan.

== History ==
The school was established in 1920 on the initiative of artist Azim Azimzade. The institution was known as the Azerbaijan State Art Studio in 1920–1921, Higher Art Workshops in 1921–1922, Higher Art School in 1922–1927, Azerbaijan State Art Technical School in 1927–1940, and Azerbaijan State Art School since 1940. In 1943, the school was named after Azim Azimzade.

On June 13, 2000, when the Azerbaijan Academy of Arts was founded, the school was transferred to the academy's administration under the name of Art College.

== School Directors ==
- Mursal Najafov

- Ayyub Huseynov (1956–1965)

- Ayyub Mammadov (1965–1975)

== Awards ==
Honorary Certificate of the Supreme Soviet of the Azerbaijan SSR — December 18, 1980.
