= Panfilovo, Sudogodsky District, Vladimir Oblast =

Panfilovo Панфилово
- Village
- Location within Vladimir Oblast Location within Russia
- Coordinates: 55°54′N 40°38′E
- Country: Russia
- Region: Vladimir Oblast
- District: Sudogodsky District
- Time zone: UTC+3:00

Panfilovo (Russian: Панфилово) is a rural locality (a village) in Golovinskoye Rural Settlement, Sudogodsky District, Vladimir Oblast, Russia. The population was 9 as of 2010.

== Geography ==
Panfilovo is located on the Vanchuga River, 26 km southwest of Sudogda (the district's administrative centre) by road. Buchkovo is the nearest rural locality.
