= Shilovo, Cherepovetsky District, Vologda Oblast =

Shilovo Шилово
- Village
- Location within Vologda Oblast Location within Russia
- Coordinates: 58°53′N 38°14′E
- Country: Russia
- Region: Vologda Oblast
- District: Cherepovetsky District
- Time zone: UTC+3:00

Shilovo (Russian: Шилово) is a rural locality (a village) in Myaksinskoye Rural Settlement, Cherepovetsky District, Vologda Oblast, Russia. The population was 4 as of 2002.

== Geography ==
Shilovo is located 39 km southeast of Cherepovets (the district's administrative centre) by road. Stepantsevo is the nearest rural locality.
