= Shilovo, Perm Krai =

Shilovo Шилово
- Village
- Location within Perm Krai Location within Russia
- Coordinates: 57°55′N 55°53′E
- Country: Russia
- Region: Perm Krai
- District: Permsky District
- Time zone: UTC+5:00

Shilovo (Russian: Шилово) is a rural locality (a village) in Kultayevskoye Rural Settlement, Permsky District, Perm Krai, Russia. The population was 61 as of 2010. There are 18 streets.

== Geography ==
Shilovo is located 27 km southwest of Perm (the district's administrative centre) by road. Petrovka is the nearest rural locality.
