= Altayskoye, Tabunsky District, Altai Krai =

Altayskoye Алтайское
- Selo
- Location within Altai Krai Location within Russia
- Coordinates: 52°47′N 78°45′E
- Country: Russia
- Region: Altai Krai
- District: Tabunsky District
- Time zone: UTC+7:00

Altayskoye (Russian: Алтайское) is a rural locality (a selo) and the administrative center of Altaysky Selsoviet, Tabunsky District, Altai Krai, Russia. The population was 1,428 as of 2013. There are 15 streets.

== Geography ==
Altayskoye is located on the Kulundinskaya plain, 3 km north of Tabuny (the district's administrative centre) by road. Tabuny is the nearest rural locality.
