= Halife Altay =

Halife Altay (Kazakh: Халифа Ғакибұлы Алтай, Halifa Ğakibūly Altai, 1917 – 15 August 2003 in Almaty) was a Kazakh author and anthropologist. He fled the People's Republic of China during the Kazakh exodus from Xinjiang, and later wrote about the migration and about Kazakh culture. He lived in Turkey for a period, and then moved to Kazakhstan.

== Works ==
- Halife Altay, Anayurttan Anadoluʹya, Ankara: Kültür Bakanlığı (1981). (Turkish)
- Halife Altay, Kazak Türklerine aid şecere, Istanbul (1997) (Turkish)
