= Buzuluk (Volgograd Oblast) =

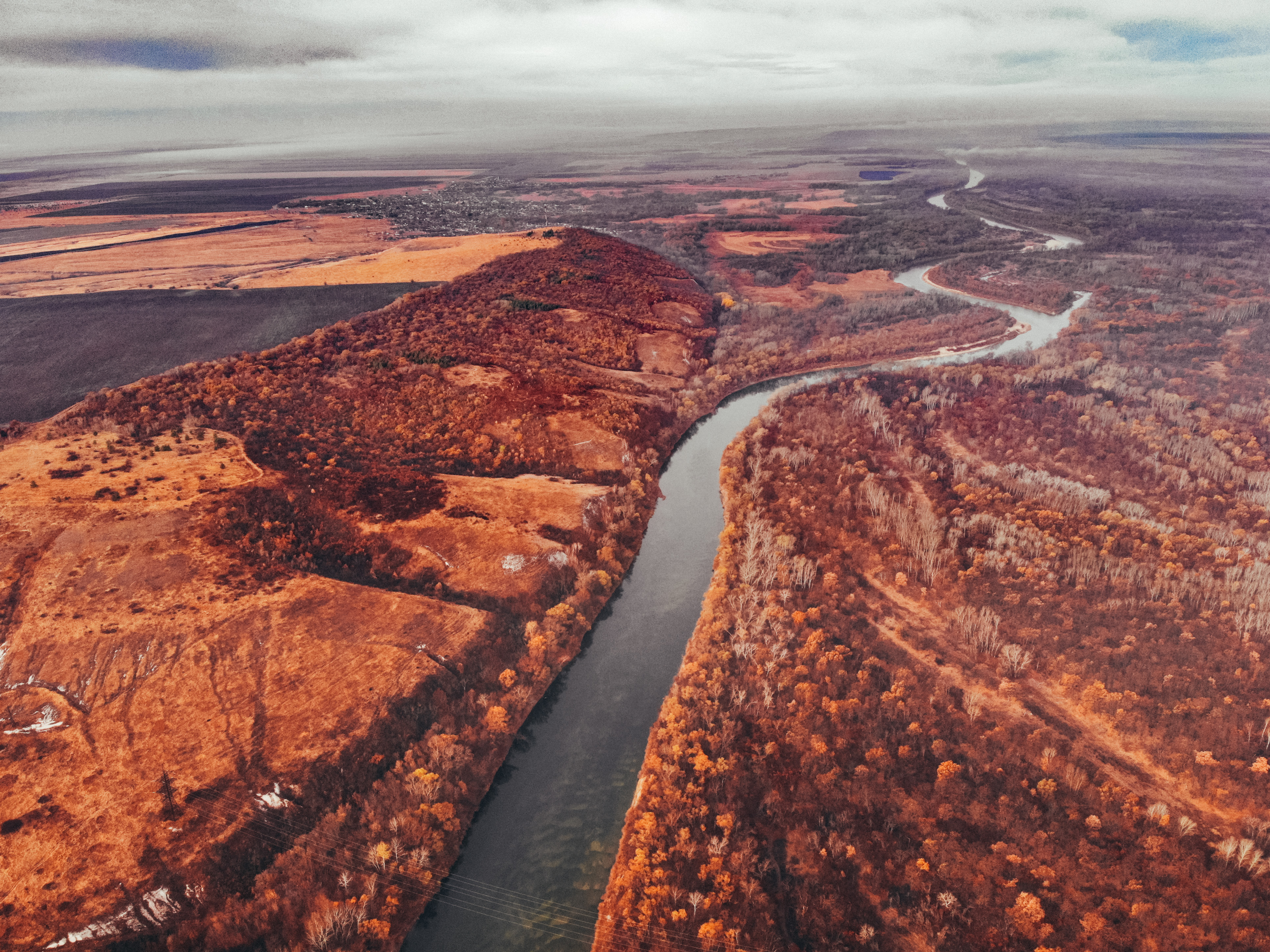
- Native name: Бузулук (Russian)

Location
- Country: Russia

Physical characteristics
- Mouth: Khopyor
  - coordinates: 50°11′58″N 42°12′01″E
- Length: 314 km (195 mi)
- Basin size: 9,510 km^{2} (3,670 sq mi)

Basin features
- Progression: Khopyor→ Don→ Sea of Azov

The Buzuluk (Russian: Бузулу́к) is a river in Volgograd Oblast, Russia. It is a left tributary of the Khopyor, and is 314 kilometers (195 mi) long, with a drainage basin of 9,510 square kilometers (3,672 sq mi). It has its sources on the westernmost slopes of the Volga Upland. During dry periods the upper reaches of the river dry up completely.

The town of Novoanninsky and the stanitsa of Preobrazhenskaya lie along the river.

== Etymology ==
The word is formed from the Turkic languages: buza (Bashkir: быҙау, romanized: bıźaw; Tatar: бозау, romanized: bozaw; Kazakh: бұзау, romanized: buzaw; Turkish: buzağı) means "calf", -lik suffixes refers that it belongs to something. According to another version, the word is formed from the Turkic buz (Bashkir: боҙ, romanized: boź; Tatar: боз, romanized: boz; Kazakh: мұз, romanized: muz; Turkish: buz) literally means "ice".
