= Kalmanka =

Kalmanka Калманка
- Selo
- Interactive map of Kalmanka
- Location of Kalmanka Kalmanka (Altai Krai)
- Coordinates: 52°53′59″N 83°32′21″E
- Country: Russia
- Federal subject: Altai Krai
- Administrative district: Kalmansky District
- SelsovietSelsoviet: Kalmansky Selsoviet

Population (2010 Census)
  - Total: 3,440
  - Estimate (2013): 3,203 (−6.9%)

Administrative status
  - Capital of: Kalmansky District, Kalmansky Selsoviet

Municipal status
  - Municipal district: Kalmansky Municipal District
  - Rural settlement: Kalmansky Selsoviet Rural Settlement
  - Capital of: Kalmansky Municipal District, Kalmansky Selsoviet Rural Settlement
- Time zone: UTC+7 (MSK+4)
- Postal code: 659041
- OKTMO ID: 01615427101

Kalmanka (Russian: Калманка) is a rural locality (a selo) and the administrative center of Kalmansky District of Altai Krai, Russia. Population: 3,440 (2010 census); 3,657 (2002 census); 3,828 (1989 Soviet census).
