= Kalmansky District =

Kalmansky District Калманский район (Russian)
- District
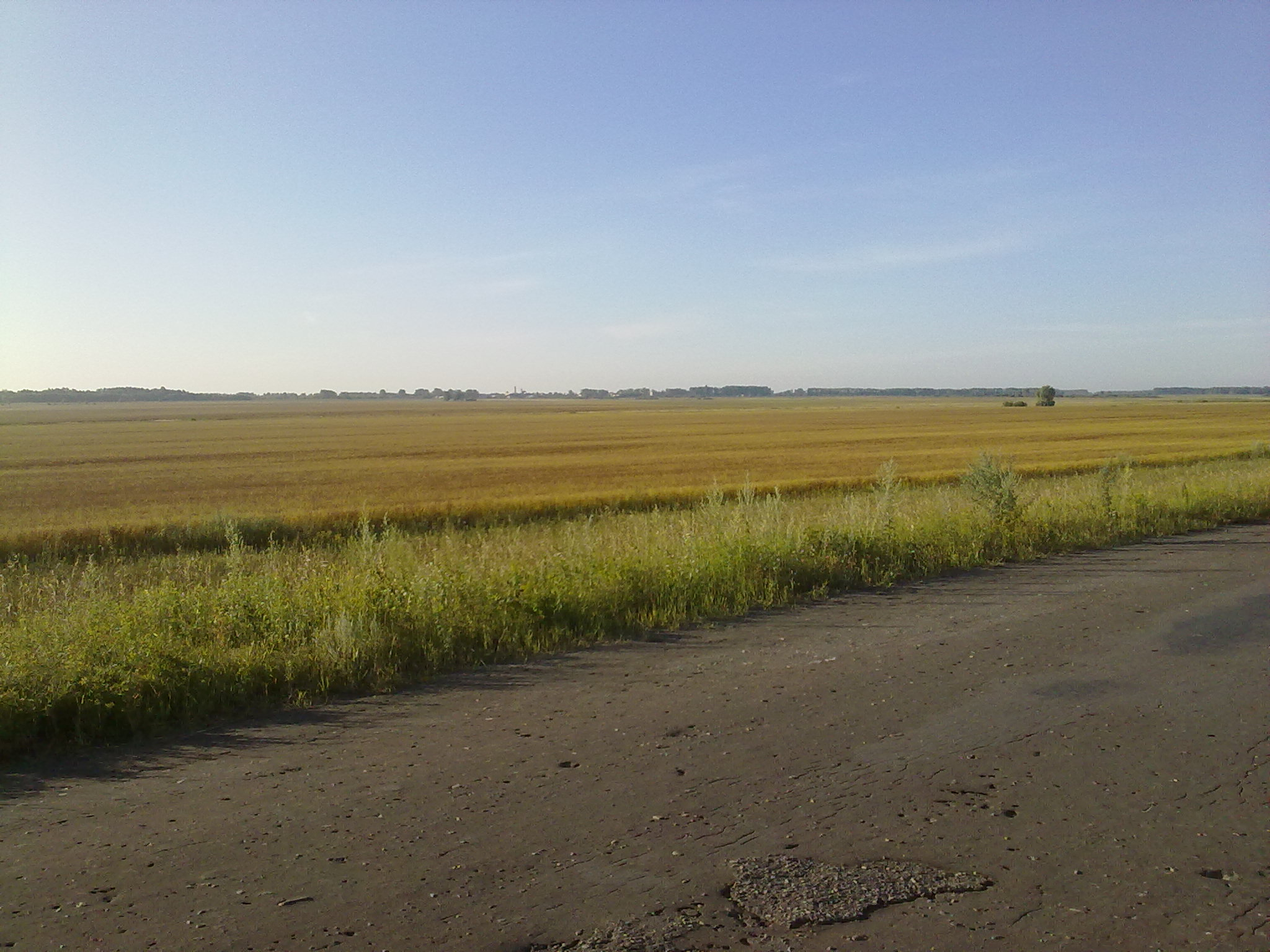
- Field scene, Kalmansky District
- Location of Kalmansky District in Altai Krai
- Coordinates: 52°53′57″N 83°32′36″E
- Country: Russia
- Federal subject: Altai Krai
- Established: 1935
- Administrative center: Kalmanka

Area
  - Total: 1,820 km^{2} (700 sq mi)

Population (2010 Census)
  - Total: 14,331
  - Density: 7.87/km^{2} (20.4/sq mi)
  - Urban: 0%
  - Rural: 100%

Administrative structure
  - Administrative divisions: 10 selsoviet
  - Inhabited localities: 24 rural localities

Municipal structure
  - Municipally incorporated as: Kalmansky Municipal District
  - Municipal divisions: 0 urban settlements, 10 rural settlements
- Time zone: UTC+7 (MSK+4)
- OKTMO ID: 01615000
- Website: http://kalmanka-adm.ru/

Kalmansky District (Russian: Калма́нский райо́н) is an administrative and municipal district (raion), one of the fifty-nine in Altai Krai, Russia. It is located in the northern central part of the krai. The area of the district is 1,820 square kilometers (700 sq mi). Its administrative center is the rural locality (a selo) of Kalmanka. Population: 14,331 (2010 census); 14,871 (2002 census); 15,801 (1989 Soviet census). The population of Kalmanka accounts for 24.0% of the district's total population.

The district is bordered on the north by Pavlovsky District and the City of Barnaul, on the east by Pervomaysky District, on the south and west by Topchikhinsky District.

== Geography ==
Kalmansky District is located in the north-central region of Altai Krai. The Ob River River runs south-to-north through the eastern side of the district, with the administrative center of Kalmanka on the west bank. The terrain is mostly rolling agricultural plain of the Priobsky Plateau, with forests on the meandering floodplain of the Baruaulka River, which runs along the northern border of the district. The district is 45 km south of the regional city of Barnaul, and 2,900 km east of Moscow. The area measures 50 km (north-south), and 50 km (west-east); total area is 1,820 km2 (about 2% of Altai Krai).

== Climate ==
Average temperature in January is −17.7 °C (0.1 °F), and average July temperature is 19.6 °C (67.3 °F). Annual precipitation is 350 millimeters (14 in). The climate is Humid continental climate, cool summer, (Dfb). This climate is characterized by large swings in temperature, both diurnally and seasonally, with mild summers and cold, snowy winters.
