= Novoanninsky (town) =

Town in Volgograd Oblast, Russia

Novoanninsky Новоаннинский
- Town
- Interactive map of Novoanninsky
- Location of Novoanninsky Novoanninsky (Volgograd Oblast)
- Coordinates: 50°32′N 42°41′E
- Country: Russia
- Federal subject: Volgograd Oblast
- Administrative district: Novoanninsky District
- Town of district significanceSelsoviet: Novoanninsky
- Founded: 1872
- Town status since: 1956
- Elevation: 87 m (285 ft)

Population (2010 Census)
  - Total: 17,912
  - Estimate (2021): 15,351 (−14.3%)

Administrative status
  - Capital of: Novoanninsky District, town of district significance of Novoanninsky

Municipal status
  - Municipal district: Novoanninsky Municipal District
  - Urban settlement: Novoanninsky Urban Settlement
  - Capital of: Novoanninsky Municipal District, Novoanninsky Urban Settlement
- Time zone: UTC+3 (MSK)
- Postal code: 403950
- OKTMO ID: 18638101001

Novoanninsky (Russian: Новоа́ннинский) is a town and the administrative center of Novoanninsky District in Volgograd Oblast, Russia, located on the Buzuluk River (a tributary of Don's basin), 254 kilometers (158 mi) northwest of Volgograd, the administrative center of the oblast. Population: 17,912 (2010 census); 19,472 (2002 census); 20,922 (1989 Soviet census).

== History ==
It was granted town status in 1956. Before that, it was a rural settlement. Its development accelerated after the construction of the railway line in the region, which boosted trade and communication.

== Geography ==
Novoanninsky lies in the forest-steppe zone of European Russia. The surrounding terrain is mostly flat with some gently rolling hills. The Buzuluk River runs the town, contributing to its agricultural suitability.

The region experiences a humid continental climate, with cold winters and hot, dry summers. Average temperatures range from -10°C (14 °F) in January to 24 °C (75 °F) in July

== Administrative and municipal status ==
Within the framework of administrative divisions, Novoanninsky serves as the administrative center of Novoanninsky District. As an administrative division, it is, together with the settlement of uchkhoza Novoanninskogo selkhoztekhnikuma, incorporated within Novoanninsky District as the town of district significance of Novoanninsky. As a municipal division, the town of district significance of Novoanninsky is incorporated within Novoanninsky Municipal District as Novoanninsky Urban Settlement.

== Transportation ==
The railway station in Novoanninsky is called Filonovo Railway Station, which lies on the railway line connecting Volgograd to Moscow. Road connections link Novoanninsky to nearby districts and regional centers.

== Culture and Landmarks ==
Novoanninsky has a local museum of history and culture, a war memorial, and several public parks. Cultural activities often revolve around traditional Russian celebrations, and the town hosts regional fairs and festivals during the summer months.
