= Novoanninsky District =

Novoanninsky District Новоаннинский район (Russian)
- District
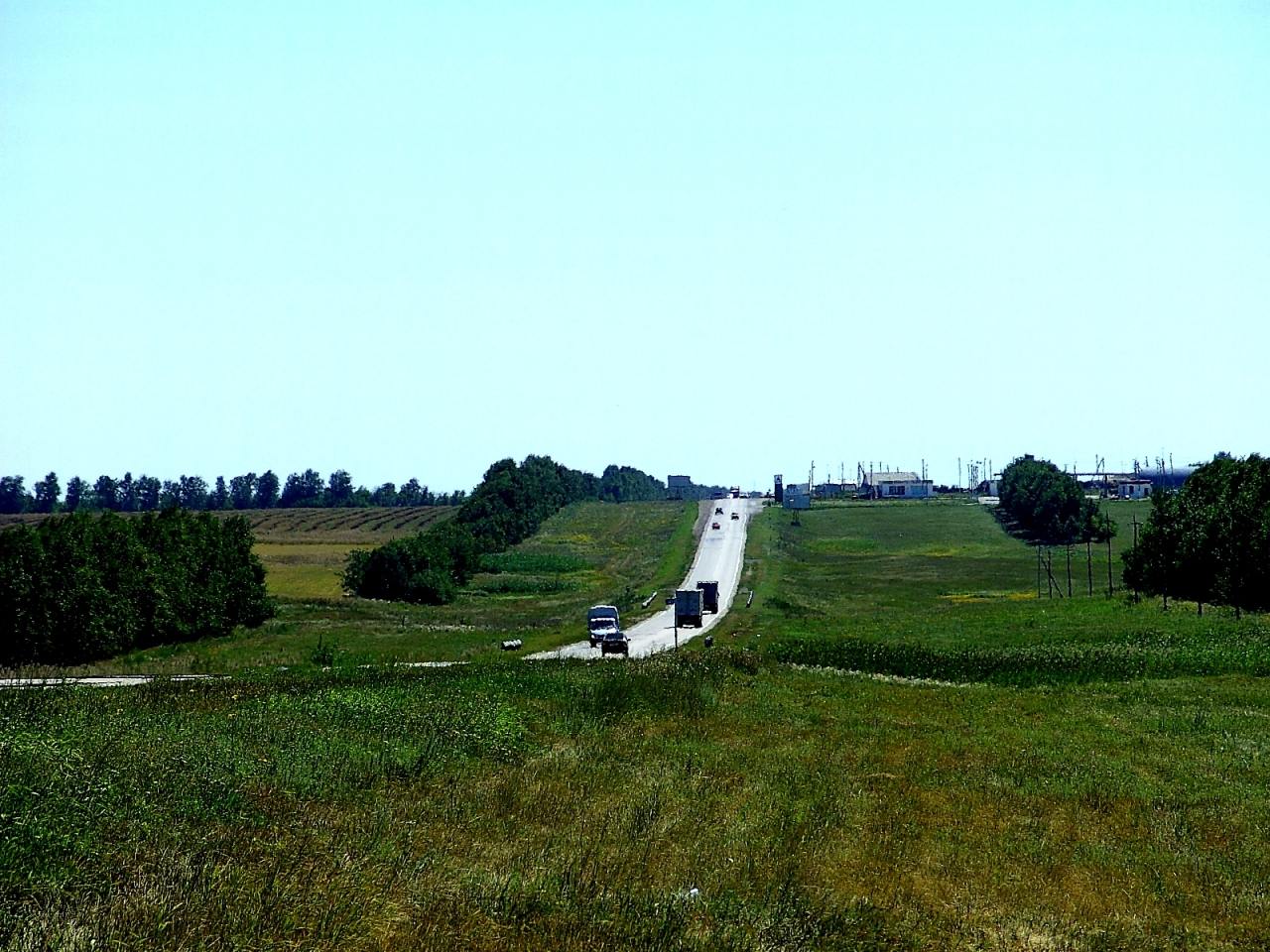
- M6 Federal Highway in Novoanninsky District

- Coat of arms
- Location of Novoanninsky District in Volgograd Oblast
- Coordinates: 50°31′N 42°40′E
- Country: Russia
- Federal subject: Volgograd Oblast
- Established: 23 June 1928
- Administrative center: Novoanninsky

Area
  - Total: 3,080 km^{2} (1,190 sq mi)

Population (2010 Census)
  - Total: 37,306
  - Density: 12.1/km^{2} (31.4/sq mi)
  - Urban: 48.0%
  - Rural: 52.0%

Administrative structure
  - Administrative divisions: 1 Towns of district significance, 13 Selsoviets
  - Inhabited localities: 1 cities/towns, 69 rural localities

Municipal structure
  - Municipally incorporated as: Novoanninsky Municipal District
  - Municipal divisions: 1 urban settlements, 13 rural settlements
- Time zone: UTC+3 (MSK)
- OKTMO ID: 18638000
- Website: http://newanna.ru/

Novoanninsky District (Russian: Новоа́ннинский райо́н) is an administrative district (raion), one of the thirty-three in Volgograd Oblast, Russia. As a municipal division, it is incorporated as Novoanninsky Municipal District. It is located in the northwest of the oblast. The area of the district is 3,080 square kilometers (1,190 sq mi). Its administrative center is the town of Novoanninsky. Population: 37,306 (2010 census); 41,611 (2002 Census); 44,758 (1989 Soviet census). The population of the administrative center accounts for 48.0% of the district's total population.
