= Shilovo constituency =

Russian legislative constituency

Shilovo single-member constituency
- Constituency of the Russian State Duma

- Constituency boundaries from 1995 to 2003
- Deputy: None
- Federal subject: Ryazan Oblast
- Districts: Novoderevensky, Chuchkovsky, Kadomsky, Kasimov, Kasimovsky, Klepikovsky, Korablinsky, Miloslavsky, Pitelinsky, Pronsky, Putyatinsky, Ryazhsky, Sapozhkovsky, Sarayevsky, Sasovo, Sasovsky, Shatsky, Shilovsky, Skopin, Skopinsky, Spassky, Starozhilovsky, Ukholovsky, Yermishinsky
- Voters: 482,317 (2003)

The Shilovo constituency (No.150 (Note: No.149 in 1993-1995)) was a Russian legislative constituency in Ryazan Oblast in 1993–2007. It covered rural Ryazan Oblast to the south of Ryazan. The seat was last occupied by A Just Russia-Rodina faction member Igor Morozov (elected as a United Russia candidate), who defeated first-term Agrarian incumbent State Duma member Vyacheslav Olenyev in the 2003 election.

The constituency was dissolved in 2007 when State Duma adopted full proportional representation for the next two electoral cycles. Shilovo constituency was not re-established for the 2016 election, currently its territory is split between Ryazan and Skopin constituencies.

== Boundaries ==
1993–1995: Chuchkovsky District, Kadomsky District, Kasimov, Kasimovsky District, Klepikovsky District, Korablinsky District, Miloslavsky District, Novoderevensky District, Pitelinsky District, Pronsky District, Putyatinsky District, Ryazhsky District, Sapozhkovsky District, Sarayevsky District, Sasovo, Sasovsky District, Shatsky District, Shilovsky District, Skopin, Skopinsky District, Spassky District, Ukholovsky District, Yermishinsky District

The constituency covered mostly rural central and southern Ryazan Oblast, including the towns of Kasimov, Sasovo and Skopin.

1995–2003: Chuchkovsky District, Kadomsky District, Kasimov, Kasimovsky District, Klepikovsky District, Korablinsky District, Miloslavsky District, Novoderevensky District, Pitelinsky District, Pronsky District, Putyatinsky District, Ryazhsky District, Sapozhkovsky District, Sarayevsky District, Sasovo, Sasovsky District, Shatsky District, Shilovsky District, Skopin, Skopinsky District, Spassky District, Starozhilovsky District, Ukholovsky District, Yermishinsky District

After 1995 redistricting the constituency retained all of its territory and gained rural Starozhilovsky District in central Ryazan Oblast from Ryazan constituency.

2003–2007: Chuchkovsky District, Kadomsky District, Kasimov, Kasimovsky District, Klepikovsky District, Korablinsky District, Miloslavsky District, Novoderevensky District, Pitelinsky District, Pronsky District, Putyatinsky District, Ryazansky District, Ryazhsky District, Sapozhkovsky District, Sarayevsky District, Sasovo, Sasovsky District, Shatsky District, Shilovsky District, Skopin, Skopinsky District, Spassky District, Starozhilovsky District, Ukholovsky District, Yermishinsky District

Following the 2003 redistricting the constituency retained all of its territory and gained Ryazansky District in suburban Ryazan from Ryazan constituency.

== Members elected ==
| Election | Member | Party |
|---|---|---|
| 1993 | Sergey Yenkov | Independent |
| 1995 | Sergey Yenkov | Agrarian Party |
| 1999 | Vyacheslav Olenyev | Independent |
| 2003 | Igor Morozov | United Russia |

== Election results ==
=== 1993 ===
==== Declared candidates ====
- Nikolay Agibalov (Civic Union), construction executive
- Mikhail Giryayev (APR), Head of the Main Department of Forest Management at the Federal Service for Forestry (1989–present)
- Mikhail Kosikov (Independent), Head of Administration of Putyatinsky District (1981–present)
- Anatoly Sidorov (LDPR), economist
- Gleb Yakunin (Choice of Russia), former People's Deputy of Russia (1990–1993), co-chairman of the Democratic Russia movement (1990–present)
- Sergey Yenkov (Independent), former Member of Ryazan Oblast Council of People's Deputies (1990–1993), agriculture union leader

==== Results ====
Summary of the 12 December 1993 Russian legislative election in the Shilovo constituency
| Candidate | Party | Votes | % |
|---|---|---|---|
| Sergey Yenkov | Independent | 71,578 | 21.02% |
| Mikhail Kosikov | Independent | 65,682 | 19.28% |
| Nikolay Agibalov | Civic Union | 37,687 | 11.07% |
| Gleb Yakunin | Choice of Russia | 29,860 | 8.77% |
| Anatoly Sidorov | Liberal Democratic Party | 29,627 | 8.70% |
| Mikhail Giryayev | Agrarian Party | 28,751 | 8.44% |
| against all | | 50,867 | 14.94% |
| Total | | 340,588 | 100% |

=== 1995 ===
==== Declared candidates ====
- Sergey Dergachev (PES), production depot director
- Vasily Grigoryev (Independent), Head of Administration of Klepikovsky District
- Vladimir Groshev (Independent), investment banker (previously ran as NDR candidate)
- Grigory Ivliyev (Independent), deputy chief of staff to the State Duma Committee on Legislation and Judicial Reform
- Viktor Rakov (LDPR), coordinator of the party regional office
- Yury Savchuk (KRO), ZiL Ryazan plant director
- Sergey Yenkov (APR), incumbent Member of State Duma (1994–present)

==== Results ====
Summary of the 17 December 1995 Russian legislative election in the Shilovo constituency
| Candidate | Party | Votes | % |
|---|---|---|---|
| Sergey Yenkov (incumbent) | Agrarian Party | 103,336 | 28.65% |
| Grigory Ivliyev | Independent | 91,462 | 25.36% |
| Vladimir Groshev | Independent | 68,365 | 18.95% |
| Viktor Rakov | Liberal Democratic Party | 22,998 | 6.38% |
| Vasily Grigoryev | Independent | 22,788 | 6.32% |
| Yury Savchuk | Congress of Russian Communities | 13,698 | 3.80% |
| Sergey Dergachev | Party of Economic Freedom | 6,764 | 1.88% |
| against all | | 26,308 | 7.29% |
| Total | | 360,716 | 100% |

=== 1999 ===
==== Declared candidates ====
- Nikolay Barsuk (NDR), chief doctor of the Ryazan city hospital No.11
- Andrey Bychkaylo (MTM), bank executive
- Valery Kalashnikov (OVR), former Chairman of the Ryazan Oblast Executive Committee (1990–1991), 1996 gubernatorial candidate
- Vasily Martynov (Independent), unemployed
- Vyacheslav Olenyev (Independent), Member of Ryazan Oblast Duma (1997–present), Head of Administration of Klepikovsky District (1988–present)
- Oksana Pavlyuchenko (Independent), unemployed
- Viktor Rakov (LDPR), coordinator of the party regional office, 1995 candidate for this seat
- Vladimir Rasskazov (For Civil Dignity), former People's Deputy of Russia (1990–1993)
- Aleksey Sukhov (SPS), individual entrepreneur
- Dmitry Voronkov (RSP), chief doctor of the Ryazan Oblast clinical hospital
- Igor Yanin (DN), nonprofit president, journalist

==== Did not file ====
- Nina Filkina (Independent)
- Aleksandr Kondrashov (Stalin Bloc), pharmaceutical businessman
- Viktor Laryushin (Independent)
- Oleg Senyukov (Independent)

==== Declined ====
- Sergey Yenkov (OVR), incumbent Member of State Duma (1994–present)

==== Results ====
Summary of the 19 December 1999 Russian legislative election in the Shilovo constituency
| Candidate | Party | Votes | % |
|---|---|---|---|
| Vyacheslav Olenyev | Independent | 97,536 | 32.60% |
| Valery Kalashnikov | Fatherland – All Russia | 55,094 | 18.42% |
| Nikolay Barsuk | Our Home – Russia | 21,695 | 7.25% |
| Dmitry Voronkov | Russian Socialist Party | 18,688 | 6.25% |
| Vladimir Rasskazov | For Civil Dignity | 12,226 | 4.09% |
| Aleksey Sukhov | Union of Right Forces | 12,180 | 4.07% |
| Igor Yanin | Spiritual Heritage | 11,812 | 3.95% |
| Viktor Rakov | Liberal Democratic Party | 10,996 | 3.68% |
| Oksana Pavlyuchenko | Independent | 10,765 | 3.60% |
| Vasily Martynov | Independent | 4,695 | 1.57% |
| Andrey Bychkaylo | Peace, Labour, May | 3,059 | 1.02% |
| against all | | 34,943 | 11.68% |
| Total | | 299,154 | 100% |

=== 2003 ===
==== Declared candidates ====
- Sergey Akimov (LDPR), businessman
- Anatoly Boronenkov (Independent), legal counsel
- Nikolay Bocharov (Rodina), Ministry of Economic Development and Trade of Russia official
- Vladimir Gridasov (SPS), energy executive
- Leonid Kanayev (KPE), former Member of State Duma (1996–1999), 2000 gubernatorial candidate
- Anatoly Karpus (VR–ES), neurologist
- Vasily Kirin (Independent), measuring equipment plant director
- Nikolay Komkov (RPP-PSS), State Duma staffer
- Svetlana Kprf (Independent), pediatrician
- Igor Morozov (United Russia), Senator from Ryazan Oblast (2001–present)
- Vyacheslav Olenyev (APR), incumbent Member of State Duma (2000–present)
- Yevgeny Vologzhanin (PVR-RPZh), military pensioner, 2000 gubernatorial candidate
- Aleksey Zakharov (ORP Rus'), businessman

==== Did not file ====
- Eldar Ibragimov (IPR), unemployed

==== Results ====
Summary of the 7 December 2003 Russian legislative election in the Shilovo constituency
| Candidate | Party | Votes | % |
|---|---|---|---|
| Igor Morozov | United Russia | 94,822 | 34.76% |
| Vyacheslav Olenyev (incumbent) | Agrarian Party | 72,736 | 26.66% |
| Nikolay Komkov | Russian Pensioners' Party-Party of Social Justice | 20,115 | 7.37% |
| Svetlana Kprf | Independent | 14,143 | 5.18% |
| Sergey Akimov | Liberal Democratic Party | 9,859 | 3.61% |
| Vasily Kirin | Independent | 9,852 | 3.61% |
| Nikolay Bocharov | Rodina | 6,520 | 2.39% |
| Vladimir Gridasov | Union of Right Forces | 4,955 | 1.82% |
| Yevgeny Vologzhanin | Party of Russia's Rebirth-Russian Party of Life | 3,959 | 1.45% |
| Leonid Kanayev | Conceptual Party "Unity" | 2,097 | 0.77% |
| Aleksey Zakharov | United Russian Party Rus' | 1,529 | 0.56% |
| Anatoly Karpus | Great Russia – Eurasian Union | 1,407 | 0.52% |
| against all | | 25,579 | 9.38% |
| Total | | 272,958 | 100% |
