= Ryazan constituency =

Russian legislative constituency

Ryazan single-member constituency
- Constituency of the Russian State Duma

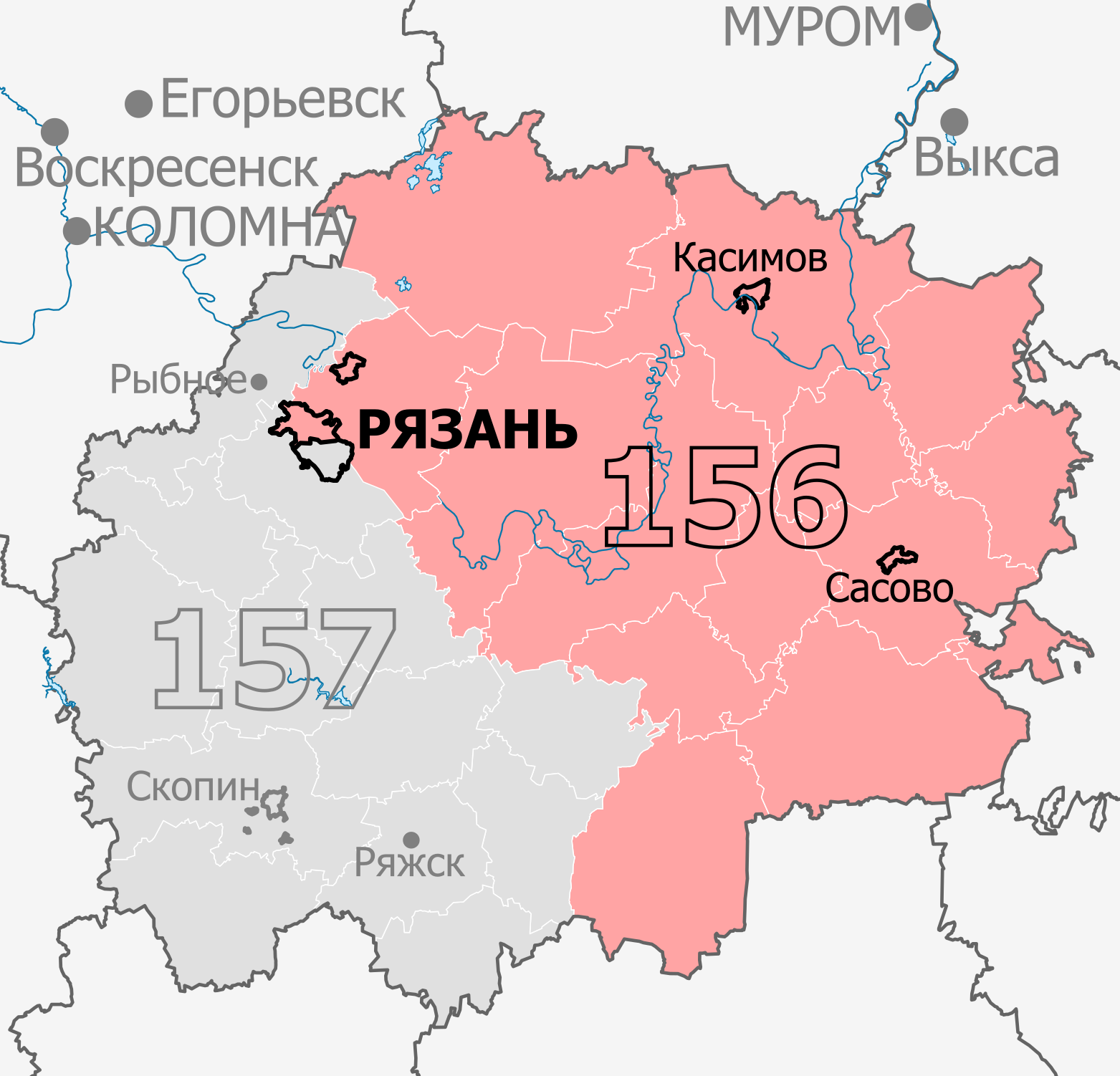
- Constituency boundaries since 2016
- Deputy: Andrey Krasov; United Russia
- Federal subject: Ryazan Oblast
- Districts: Chuchkovsky, Kadomsky, Kasimov, Kasimovsky, Klepikovsky, Pitelinsky, Putyatinsky, Ryazan (Moskovsky, Sovetsky), Ryazansky (Dubrovichskoye, Dyadkovskoye, Korablinskoye, Lgovskoye, Listvyanskoye, Murminskoye, Polyanskoye, Varskovskoye, Vyshgorodskoye, Zaboryevskoye, Zaokskoye), Sarayevsky, Sasovo, Sasovsky, Shatsky, Shilovsky, Spassky, Yermishinsky
- Voters: 425,230 (2026)

The Ryazan constituency (No.157 (Note: No.148 in 1993-1995, No.149 in 1995-2007, No.156 in 2016–2026)) is a Russian legislative constituency in Ryazan Oblast. The constituency covers northern half of Ryazan and rural eastern Ryazan Oblast, including the cities Kasimov and Sasovo.

The constituency has been represented since 2016 by United Russia deputy Andrey Krasov, four-term State Duma member, former Commander of the Ryazan Guards Higher Airborne Command School and retired Russian Airborne Forces guards colonel.

== Boundaries ==
1993–1995: Mikhaylovsky District, Ryazan, Ryazansky District, Rybnovsky District, Starozhilovsky District, Zakharovsky District
The constituency covered oblast capital Ryazan, its suburbs and north-western corner of Ryazan Oblast.

1995–2003: Mikhaylovsky District, Ryazan, Ryazansky District, Rybnovsky District, Zakharovsky District
After 1995 redistricting the constituency lost rural Starozhilovsky District in central Ryazan Oblast to Shilovo constituency.

2003–2007: Mikhaylovsky District, Ryazan, Rybnovsky District, Zakharovsky District
Following the 2003 redistricting the constituency lost Ryazansky District, covering most of Ryazan suburbs to Shilovo constituency.

2016–present: Chuchkovsky District, Kadomsky District, Kasimov, Kasimovsky District, Klepikovsky District, Pitelinsky District, Putyatinsky District, Ryazan (Moskovsky, Sovetsky), Ryazansky District (Dubrovichskoye, Dyadkovskoye, Korablinskoye, Lgovskoye, Listvyanskoye, Murminskoye, Polyanskoye, Varskovskoye, Vyshgorodskoye, Zaboryevskoye, Zaokskoye), Sarayevsky District, Sasovo, Sasovsky District, Shatsky District, Shilovsky District, Spassky District, Yermishinsky District
The constituency was re-created for the 2016 election and retained only northern half of Ryazan, losing the rest of its former territory to new Skopin constituency. This seat was pushed eastwards, gaining rural eastern Ryazan Oblast from the eliminated Shilovo constituency.

== Members elected ==
Election	Member	Party
1993	Konstantin Laikam	Civic Union
1995	Leonid Kanayev	Communist Party
1999	Nadezhda Korneyeva	Communist Party
2003	Nikolay Bulayev (Note: appointed Chairman of the Federal Agency on Education in October 2007)	United Russia
2007	Proportional representation - no election by constituency	
2011	Proportional representation - no election by constituency	
2016	Andrey Krasov	United Russia
2021	Andrey Krasov	United Russia
2026	Andrey Krasov	United Russia

== Election results ==
=== 1993 ===
Summary of the 12 December 1993 Russian legislative election in the Ryazan constituency
Candidate	Party	Votes	%
Konstantin Laikam	Civic Union	56,001	17.53%
Sergey Komarov	Independent	36,141	11.31%
Nadezhda Pribytkova	Independent	34,792	10.89%
Yury Khristoforov	Independent	34,431	10.78%
Georgy Sherozia	Choice of Russia	30,810	9.64%
Gennady Telnykh	Democratic Party	25,429	7.96%
Aleksandr Neumyvakin	Dignity and Charity	11,829	3.70%
Viktor Lozinsky	Yavlinsky–Boldyrev–Lukin	8,910	2.79%
against all		53,000	16.59%
Total		319,520	100%

=== 1995 ===
Summary of the 17 December 1995 Russian legislative election in the Ryazan constituency
Candidate	Party	Votes	%
Leonid Kanayev	Communist Party	93,453	26.55%
Mikhail Malakhov	Independent	36,631	10.41%
Yevgeny Stroyev	Independent	26,130	7.42%
Nina Aleshina	Independent	25,774	7.32%
Konstantin Laikam (incumbent)	Stable Russia	19,084	5.42%
Sergey Voblenko	Our Home – Russia	16,803	4.77%
Vyacheslav Kichenin	Independent	14,903	4.23%
Anatoly Kapustin	Liberal Democratic Party	14,054	3.99%
Sergey Kosourov	Communists and Working Russia - for the Soviet Union	10,829	3.08%
Igor Trushin	Yabloko	10,235	2.91%
Anatoly Grynin	Congress of Russian Communities	9,788	2.78%
Aleksandr Gavrilov	Power to the People	9,629	2.74%
Anatoly Alekseyev	Independent	6,551	1.86%
Gennady Telnykh	Stanislav Govorukhin Bloc	5,532	1.57%
Yevgeny Podkolzin	For the Motherland!	5,020	1.43%
Aleksandr Yudin	Party of Workers' Self-Government	4,046	1.15%
Aleksandr Nazarkin	Independent	3,851	1.09%
Vladislav Lomizov	Russian Lawyers' Association	3,781	1.07%
Mikhail Taraskin	Union of ZhKKh Workers	2,911	0.83%
Vyacheslav Tkachenko	Independent	2,735	0.78%
Aleksandr Belyakov	Independent	4,767	1.52%
Aleksandr Abramovich	Working Collectives and Greens for SSR	1,442	0.41%
Boris Gusev	Independent	910	0.26%
Boris Gereyev	Federal Democratic Movement	832	0.24%
against all		21,513	6.11%
Total		351,946	100%

=== 1999 ===
Summary of the 19 December 1999 Russian legislative election in the Ryazan constituency
Candidate	Party	Votes	%
Nadezhda Korneyeva	Communist Party	61,258	19.27%
Mikhail Malakhov	Union of Right Forces	42,553	13.39%
Nikolay Bulayev	Fatherland – All Russia	30,512	9.60%
Mikhail Lipatov	Movement in Support of the Army	25,237	7.94%
Leonid Kanayev (incumbent)	Independent	17,476	5.50%
Vladimir Aksyonov	Independent	15,886	5.00%
Boris Khramov	Yabloko	13,990	4.40%
Valery Danilchenko	Our Home – Russia	13,603	4.28%
Alina Milekhina	Independent	12,090	3.80%
Nadezhda Kulikova	Independent	11,758	3.70%
Stanislav Terekhov	Stalin Bloc – For the USSR	6,777	2.13%
Sofya Petrova	Independent	4,868	1.53%
Cheslav Mlynnik	Independent	3,582	1.13%
Stanislav Karpov	Peace, Labour, May	3,458	1.09%
Sergey Yudin	Independent	3,196	1.01%
Yury Malistov	Independent	2,942	0.93%
against all		42,792	13.46%
Total		317,840	100%

=== 2003 ===
Summary of the 7 December 2003 Russian legislative election in the Ryazan constituency
Candidate	Party	Votes	%
Nikolay Bulayev	United Russia	78,938	31.42%
Nadezhda Korneyeva (incumbent)	Communist Party	40,039	15.94%
Igor Trubitsyn	Independent	25,883	11.45%
Aleksandr Sherin	Liberal Democratic Party	11,854	4.72%
Sergey Tabolin	Yabloko	10,710	4.26%
Viktor Milekhin	Independent	10,184	4.05%
Boris Dmitriyev	Union of Right Forces	5,379	2.14%
Aleksey Mikhaylov	Independent	5,005	1.99%
Vladimir Viktorov	Independent	4,583	1.82%
Sergey Kprf	Independent	4,394	1.75%
Igor Potapov	Great Russia – Eurasian Union	4,107	1.63%
Aleksandr Sidorov	United Russian Party Rus'	3,181	1.27%
against all		39,064	15.55%
Total		251,472	100%

=== 2016 ===
Summary of the 18 September 2016 Russian legislative election in the Ryazan constituency
Candidate	Party	Votes	%
Andrey Krasov	United Russia	99,768	49.09%
Galina Gnuskina	Communist Party	29,841	14.68%
Yury Kravchenko	Liberal Democratic Party	25,743	12.66%
Andrey Lyablin	A Just Russia	12,787	6.29%
Denis Desinov	Communists of Russia	9,703	4.77%
Maria Yepifanova	Yabloko	7,060	3.47%
Vladimir Rogov	Rodina	5,449	2.68%
Irina Kusova	People's Freedom Party	4,738	2.33%
Andrey Tumashev	The Greens	2,391	1.18%
Total		203,267	100%

=== 2021 ===
Summary of the 17-19 September 2021 Russian legislative election in the Ryazan constituency
Candidate	Party	Votes	%
Andrey Krasov (incumbent)	United Russia	81,024	39.57%
Oleg Strukov	Communist Party	28,226	13.78%
Aleksandr Averin	A Just Russia — For Truth	22,767	11.12%
Dmitry Detinov	New People	15,594	7.62%
Andrey Lyubimov	Yabloko	15,341	7.49%
Maksim Mustafin	Liberal Democratic Party	11,408	5.57%
Sergey Perimbayev	Communists of Russia	11,185	5.46%
Pavel Voronin	Party of Pensioners	10,880	5.31%
Aleksandr Rzhanov	Rodina	2,509	1.23%
Total		204,774	100%

=== 2026 ===
Summary of the 18-20 September 2026 Russian legislative election in the Ryazan constituency
Candidate	Party	Votes	%
Andrey Krasov (incumbent)	United Russia	137,593	56.75%
Vladimir Yakunin	Communist Party	31,874	13.15%
Pavel Vasilyev	Liberal Democratic Party	26,033	10.74%
Dina Fatina	New People	16,418	6.77%
Svetlana Menshikova	A Just Russia	14,484	5.97%
Natalya Rubina	Party of Pensioners	12,283	5.07%
Total		242,464	100%
