= Skopin constituency =

Skopin single-member constituency
- Constituency of the Russian State Duma

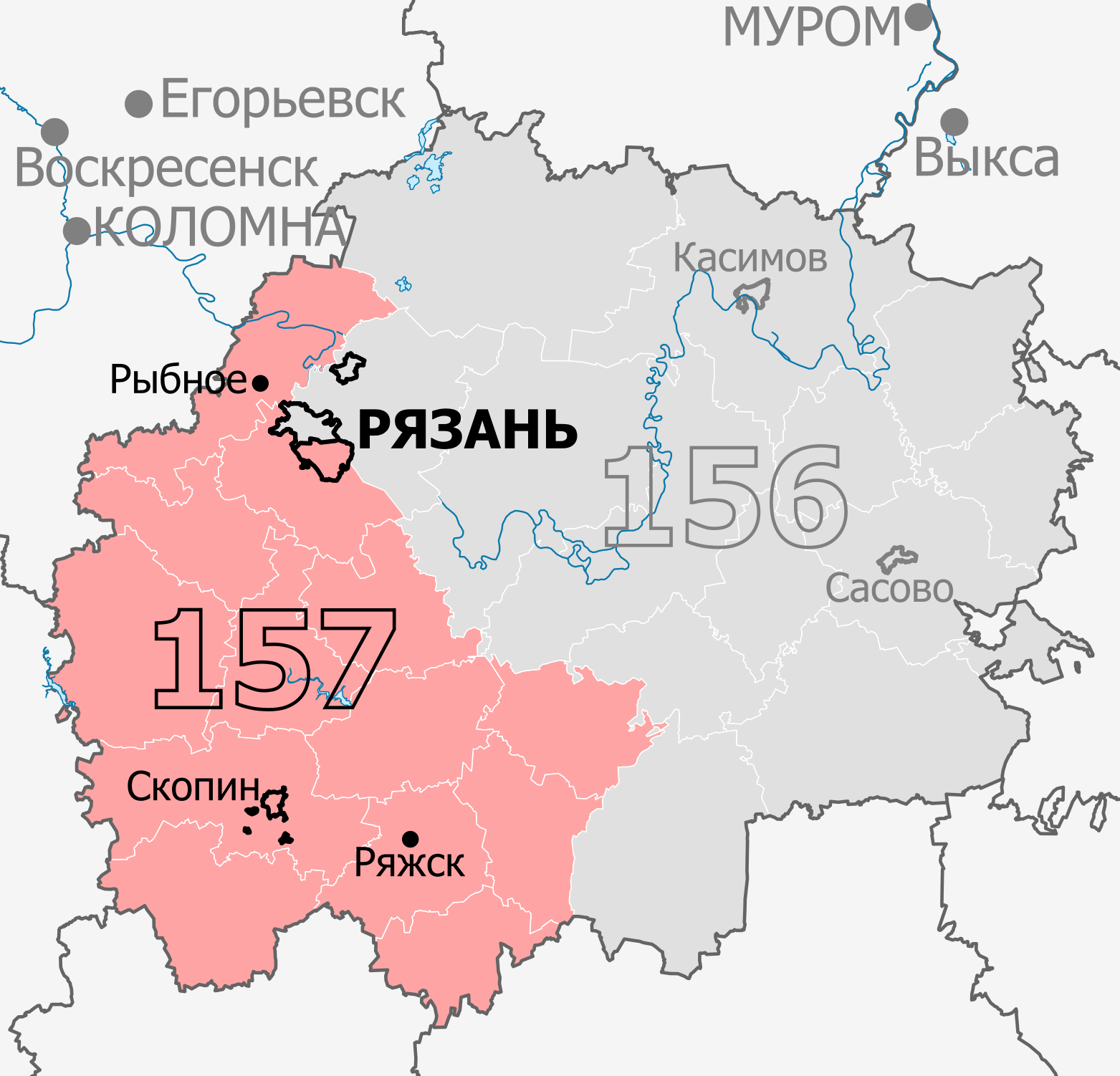
- Constituency boundaries since 2016
- Deputy: Liana Pepelyayeva; United Russia
- Federal subject: Ryazan Oblast
- Districts: Alexandro-Nevsky, Korablinsky, Mikhaylovsky, Miloslavsky, Pronsky, Ryazan (Oktyabrsky, Zheleznodorozhny), Ryazansky (Iskrovskoye, Okskoye, Podvyazyevskoye, Rovnovskoye, Semyonovskoye, Turlatovskoye, Tyushevskoye, Vyshetravinskoye, Vysokovskoye, Yekimovskoye), Ryazhsky, Sapozhkovsky, Skopin, Skopinsky, Starozhilovsky, Ukholovsky, Zakharovsky
- Voters: 428,534 (2026)

The Skopin constituency (No.158 (Note: No.157 in 2016–2026)) is a Russian legislative constituency in Ryazan Oblast. Currently the constituency covers western part of Ryazan Oblast, including southern half of Ryazan and the city of Skopin.

The constituency has been represented since 2026 by United Russia deputy Liana Pepelyayeva, former two-term State Duma member and Apparatus of the Government of Russia official, who won the open seat left vacant following the resignation of one-term United Russia deputy Dmitry Khubezov in October 2024.

== Boundaries ==
2016–present: Alexandro-Nevsky District, Korablinsky District, Mikhaylovsky District, Miloslavsky District, Pronsky District, Ryazan (Oktyabrsky, Zheleznodorozhny), Ryazansky District (Iskrovskoye, Okskoye, Podvyazyevskoye, Rovnovskoye, Semyonovskoye, Turlatovskoye, Tyushevskoye, Vyshetravinskoye, Vysokovskoye, Yekimovskoye), Ryazhsky District, Sapozhkovsky District, Skopin, Skopinsky District, Starozhilovsky District, Ukholovsky District, Zakharovsky District
The constituency was created in 2016 from western parts of former Shilovo constituency (disestablished in 2007) and parts of Ryazan constituency, taking southern half of Ryazan and almost all rural areas of the former constituency.

== Members elected ==
Election	Member	Party
2016	Yelena Mitina	United Russia
2021	Dmitry Khubezov (Note: appointed Deputy Chairman of the Government of the Altai Republic in October 2024)	United Russia
2026	Liana Pepelyayeva	United Russia

== Election results ==
=== 2016 ===
Summary of the 18 September 2016 Russian legislative election in the Skopin constituency
Candidate	Party	Votes	%
Yelena Mitina	United Russia	95,645	48.26%
Vladimir Fedotkin	Communist Party	31,839	16.07%
Aleksandr Sherin	Liberal Democratic Party	27,938	14.10%
Natalia Tsvetkova	A Just Russia	11,932	6.02%
Galina Lukyanova	Communists of Russia	7,997	4.04%
Aleksandr Tyurin	Rodina	4,152	2.10%
Valentin Baymetov	Yabloko	4,021	2.03%
Aleksandr Samokhin	People's Freedom Party	3,674	1.85%
Vladimir Denisenko	The Greens	3,320	1.67%
Igor Tambovtsev	Party of Growth	2,363	1.19%
Total		198,167	100%

=== 2021 ===
Summary of the 17-19 September 2021 Russian legislative election in the Skopin constituency
Candidate	Party	Votes	%
Dmitry Khubezov	United Russia	101,096	48.06%
Yevgeny Morozov	Communist Party	30,846	14.66%
Aleksandr Sherin	Liberal Democratic Party	29,115	13.84%
Grigory Parsentyev	A Just Russia — For Truth	12,533	5.96%
Artur Zavyalov	New People	11,460	5.45%
Natalya Rubina	Party of Pensioners	8,564	4.07%
Marina Tyurina	Communists of Russia	7,924	3.77%
Aleksandr Moseychuk	The Greens	3,276	1.56%
Total		210,360	100%

=== 2026 ===
Summary of the 18-20 September 2026 Russian legislative election in the Skopin constituency
Candidate	Party	Votes	%
Liana Pepelyayeva	United Russia	136,007	58.47%
Yevgeny Morozov	Communist Party	33,499	14.40%
Ivan Nikitchev	New People	18,174	7.81%
Maksim Mustafin	Liberal Democratic Party	17,072	7.34%
Pavel Voronin	Party of Pensioners	12,813	5.51%
Yevgeny Nikulkin	A Just Russia	11,499	4.94%
Total		232,609	100%
