= Ryazansky =

Ryazansky (masculine), Ryazanskaya (feminine), or Ryazanskoye (neuter) may refer to:

- Ryazansky District, several districts in Russia
- Ryazansky (rural locality) (Ryazanskaya, Ryazanskoye), several rural localities in Russia
- Ryazan Oblast (Ryazanskaya oblast), a federal subject of Russia
