= Sasovsky =

Sasovsky (masculine), Sasovskaya (feminine), or Sasovskoye (neuter) may refer to:

- Sasovsky District, a district of Ryazan Oblast, Russia
- Sasovsky (rural locality), a rural locality (a settlement) in Ryazan Oblast, Russia
