= Igor Morozov (politician) =

Russian politician (born 1956)

- Игорь Морозов
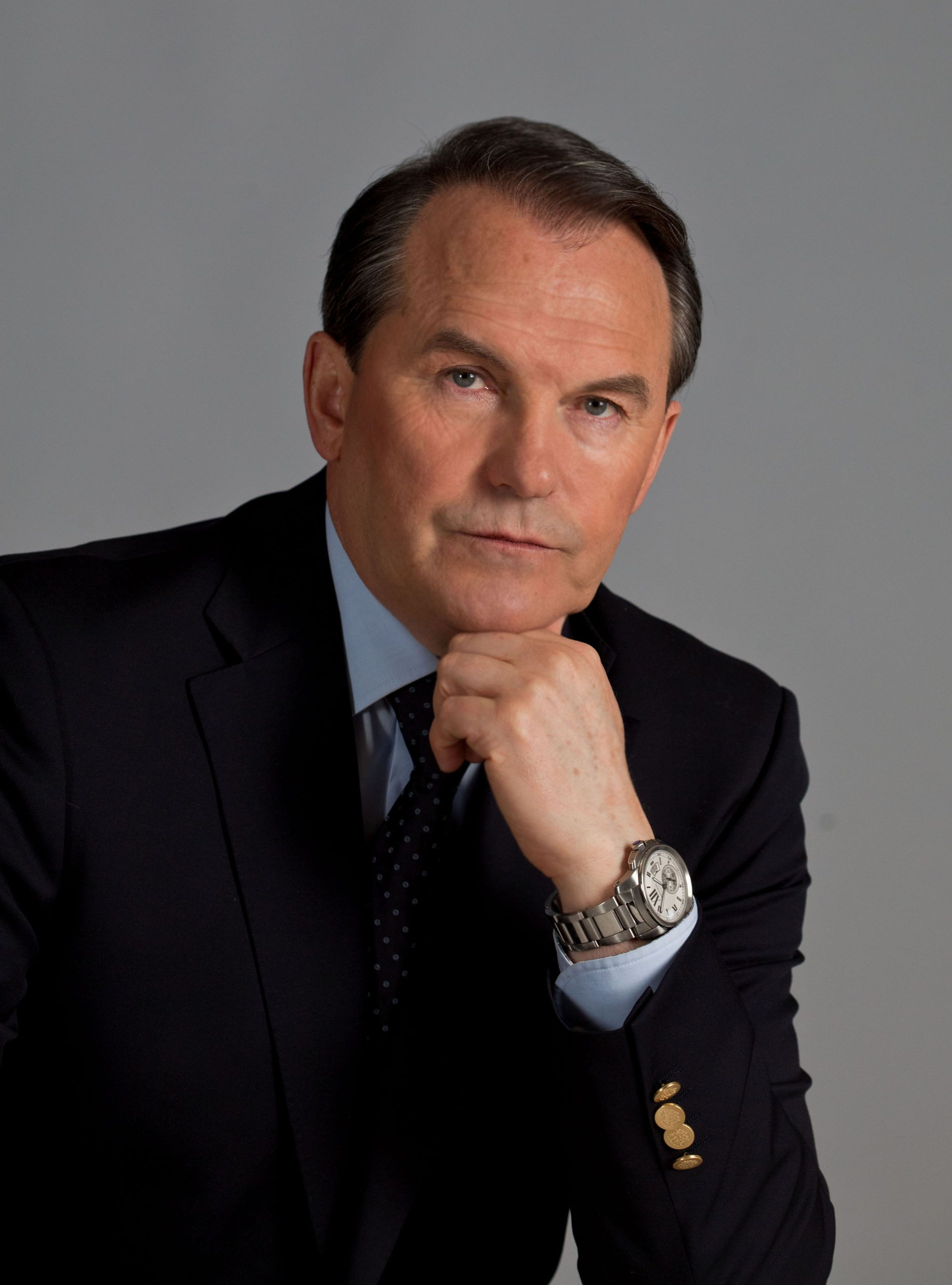
- Morozov in 2012

Russian Federation Senator from Ryazan Oblast
- Incumbent
- Assumed office 26 October 2017
- Preceded by: Larisa Tyurina
- In office 7 December 2012 – 26 October 2017
- Preceded by: Rafgat Altynbayev
- Succeeded by: Oleg Kovalyov
- In office 22 August 2001 – 7 December 2003
- Preceded by: Vladimir Fedotkin
- Succeeded by: Yury Chaplin

Member of the State Duma
- In office 2003–2007
- Constituency: Shilovo

Personal details
- Born: 10 December 1956 (age 69) Spassk-Ryazansky, Russian SFSR, Soviet Union
- Education: Moscow Higher Military Command School

Military service
- Allegiance: Soviet Union / Russia
- Branch/service: KGB / FSK
- Years of service: 1974–1994
- Rank: Lieutenant colonel

Igor Nikolayevich Morozov (Russian: И́горь Никола́евич Моро́зов; born December 10, 1956) is a Russian politician. He is a member of the Federation Council of the Ryazan Oblast since 2012 (from executive branch until 2017, and then from legislative branch, passing his former seat to ex-governor Oleg Kovalyov). Morozov was candidate for governor of Ryazan Oblast (in the elections in 2004 and in 2012). Expert in the field of international economic relations, the author of several scientific papers. He was once a special operative for the KGB, and completed at least one assignment to the Badakhshan Province in Afghanistan in 1982.

He speaks English, German and Persian languages.

== Sanctions ==
He was sanctioned by the UK government in 2022 in relation to the Russo-Ukrainian War.
