= Andrey Krasov =

Russian State Duma deputy and Airborne officer

- Андрей Красов
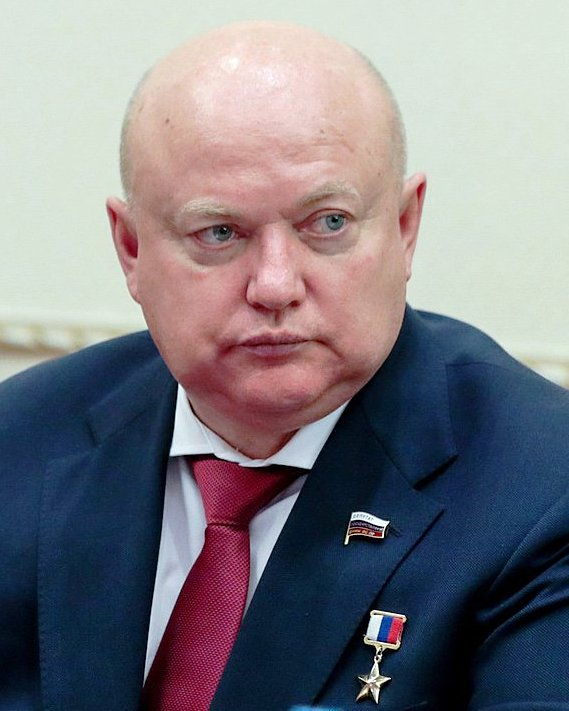

Member of the State Duma for Ryazan Oblast
- Incumbent
- Assumed office 5 October 2016
- Preceded by: constituency re-established
- Constituency: Ryazan (No. 156)

Member of the State Duma (Party List Seat)
- In office 21 December 2011 – 5 October 2016

Personal details
- Born: 27 January 1967 (age 59) Zemlyanka, Orenburg Oblast, Russian SFSR, USSR
- Party: United Russia
- Education: RVVDKU; OVA RF Armed Forces; VAGSh RF Armed Forces; RANEPA

Military service
- Allegiance: Soviet Union; Russia
- Branch/service: Russian Airborne Forces
- Years of service: 1988-present (on leave since 2011)
- Rank: Colonel
- Unit: 76th Guards Air Assault Division
- Commands: 234th Guards Air Assault Regiment

Andrey Leonidovich Krasov (Russian: Андрей Леонидович Красов; born 27 January 1967) is a Russian Airborne Forces Colonel and a Hero of the Russian Federation. He is currently the commander of Ryazan Guards Higher Airborne Command School. He was elected to the State Duma in 2011 as part of the United Russia list. In 2016 and 2021, he was elected to the State Duma in the Ryazan single member constituency.

== Biography ==
Andrey Krasov was born on January 27, 1967, in Zemlyanka, Orenburg Oblast of RSFSR. In 1988, he graduated from Ryazan Airborne Troops Institute. Andrey Krasov began his military service in the 106th Guards Airborne Division, where he served until getting the position of commander of the airborne battalion.

After finishing Frunze Academy in 2005, Andrey Krasov became the commander of the 234th Guards airborne regiment. In 2008, he was deputy commander of the 76th Airborne Division.

Colonel Krasov participated in combat operations during the 2008 Georgian campaign. During the war, he was a commander of one of the battalion's tactical task forces. His battalion was in the vanguard of the Gori offensive and engaged with the Georgian 1st mechanized brigade. On August 13 they captured a Georgian military base near the city of Gori. On September 5, 2008, Andrey Krasov was awarded Hero of the Russian Federation.

In January 2010 he became the commander of Ryazan Airborne Troops Command School.

In September–October 2010 Krasov was criticised by Russian Defence Minister Anatoly Serdyukov for ordering the demolition of a small wooden church.

== Awards ==
- Order of Alexander Nevsky (26 August 2016) — for active legislative activity and many years of conscientious work
- Commendation of the Government of the Russian Federation (17 December 2016) — for contributions to legislative activity and many years of conscientious service
