= Kadom =

Kadom Кадом
- Urban-type settlement
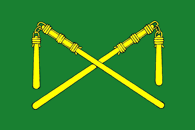
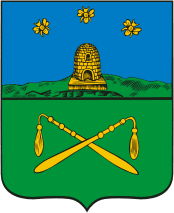
- Flag Coat of arms
- Interactive map of Kadom
- Location of Kadom Kadom (Ryazan Oblast)
- Coordinates: 54°34′N 42°28′E
- Country: Russia
- Federal subject: Ryazan Oblast
- Administrative district: Kadomsky District
- Founded: 1209

Population (2010 Census)
  - Total: 5,478
  - Estimate (2023): 5,031 (−8.2%)
- Time zone: UTC+3 (MSK)
- Postal codes: 391670, 391671
- OKTMO ID: 61606151051

Kadom (Moksha: Кадом, Kadom, Russian: Ка́дом) is an urban locality (an urban-type settlement) and the administrative center of Kadomsky District of Ryazan Oblast, Russia, located on the Moksha River 245 kilometers (152 mi) from Ryazan. Population: 5,478 (2010 census); 6,181 (2002 census); 7,250 (1989 Soviet census).

== History ==
It has been known since 1209. It had town status until 1926, when it was demoted to a rural locality. Urban-type settlement status was granted to it in 1958.

== Economy ==
Kadom is home to Kadomsky veniz, which manufactures embroidery goods. There is also a woodworking and a dairy processing plant in the settlement.
