= Dmitry Khubezov =

Russian politician

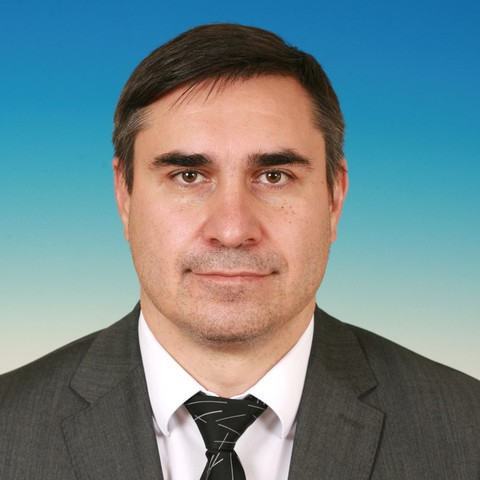
- official portrait, circa 2021

Deputy chairman of the government of the Altai Republic
- Incumbent
- Assumed office 8 October 2024
- President: Vladimir Putin
- Governor: Andrey Turchak
- Preceded by: Dinara Kultueva

Chairman of the State Duma committee on health care
- In office 12 October 2021 – 8 October 2024
- Preceded by: Dmitry Morozov
- Succeeded by: Badma Bashankayev

Deputy of the State Duma Russia
- In office 19 September 2021 – 8 October 2024
- Preceded by: Yelena Mitina
- Constituency: Skopin (No. 157)

Personal details
- Born: 20 December 1971 (age 54) Ryazan, Ryazan Oblast, Russian SFSR, USSR
- Party: United Russia
- Education: Ryazan State Medical University

Dmitry Anatolyevich Khubezov (Russian: Дмитрий Анатольевич Хубезов, born 20 December 1971 in Ryazan) is a Russian doctor and political. Deputy chairman of the government of the Altai Republic from 8 October 2024.

Deputy of the 8th State Duma from 2021 to 2023. In 1995, he was granted a Doctor of Sciences in Medicine degree.

== Biografy ==
After graduating from the Ryazan State Medical University in 1995, Khubezov started working at the Regional Clinical Hospital.

In 2017, he was appointed the head of the hospital.

In 2020, he was elected deputy of the Ryazan Oblast Duma of the 7th convocation.

Since September 2021, he has served as deputy of the 8th State Duma from the Ryazan Oblast constituency. In October 2021, he was appointed

Head of the State Duma Committee on Health Protection till in 2023.

== Sanctions ==
He was sanctioned by the UK government in 2022 in relation to the Russo-Ukrainian War.
