= Ryazansky (rural locality) =

Ryazansky (Russian: Ряза́нский; masculine), Ryazanskaya (Ряза́нская; feminine), or Ryazanskoye (Ряза́нское; neuter) is the name of several rural localities in Russia:

- Ryazansky, Bolsheglushitsky District, Samara Oblast, a settlement in Bolsheglushitsky District, Samara Oblast
- Ryazansky, Stavropolsky District, Samara Oblast, a railway crossing loop in Stavropolsky District, Samara Oblast
- Ryazanskoye, a settlement in Gavrilovsky Rural Okrug of Ozyorsky District of Kaliningrad Oblast
- Ryazanskaya (rural locality), a stanitsa in Belorechensky District of Krasnodar Krai
