= Ryazan Guards Higher Airborne Command School =

Military academy in Ryazan, Russia

Coordinates: 54.6350°N 39.7360°E

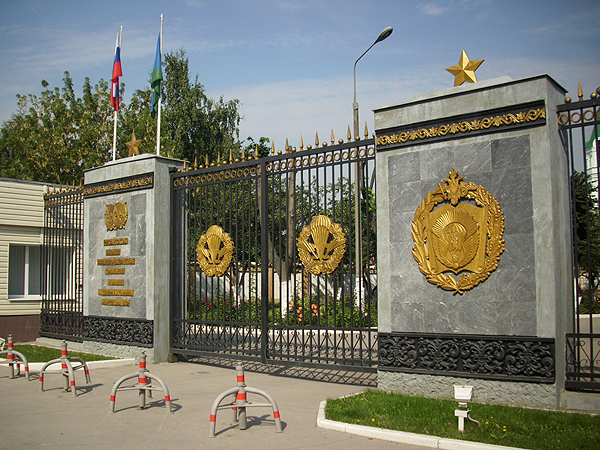
- Ryazan, Russia

Information
- School type: Military school
- Established: 13 November 1918
- Website: Official website of the school

The General V.F. Margelov Ryazan Guards Higher Airborne twice Red Banner Order of Suvorov Command School (RGVVDKU) (Russian: Ряза́нское гвардейское вы́сшее возду́шно-деса́нтное о́рдена Суво́рова два́жды Краснознамённое кома́ндное учи́лище и́мени генера́ла а́рмии В. Ф. Марге́лова) is a military educational institute of the Russian Ministry of Defense, situated in Ryazan, about 200 kilometres (120 mi) southeast of Moscow. It was first formed as the Ryazan Infantry Courses on 13 November 1918 – thus it is one of the oldest active military academies in modern day Russia.

It is the main officer commissioning school of the Russian Airborne Forces. The other institution that provides officers for the Airborne Forces is the Far Eastern Higher Combined Arms Command School.

== Early history ==
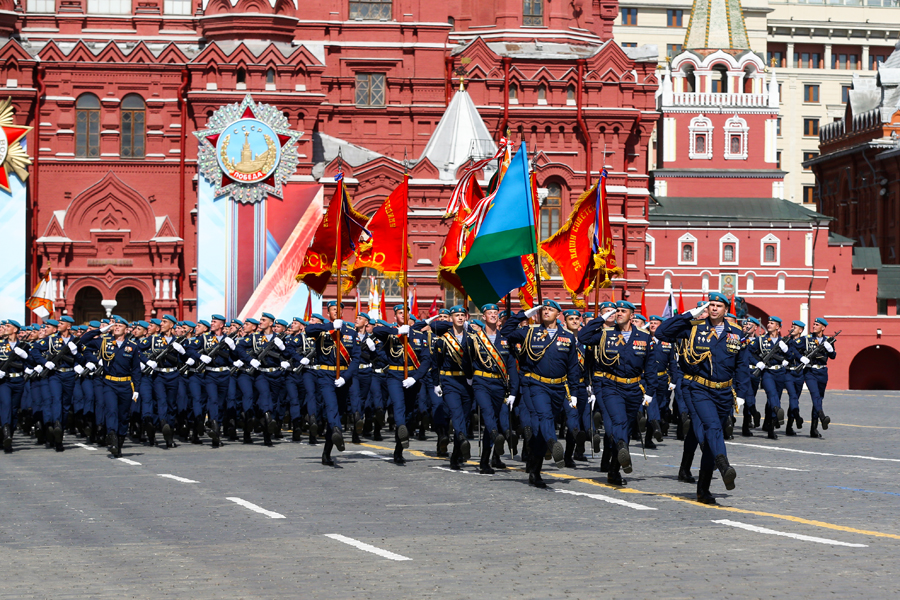
Cadets parading on Red Square, 9 May 2016.

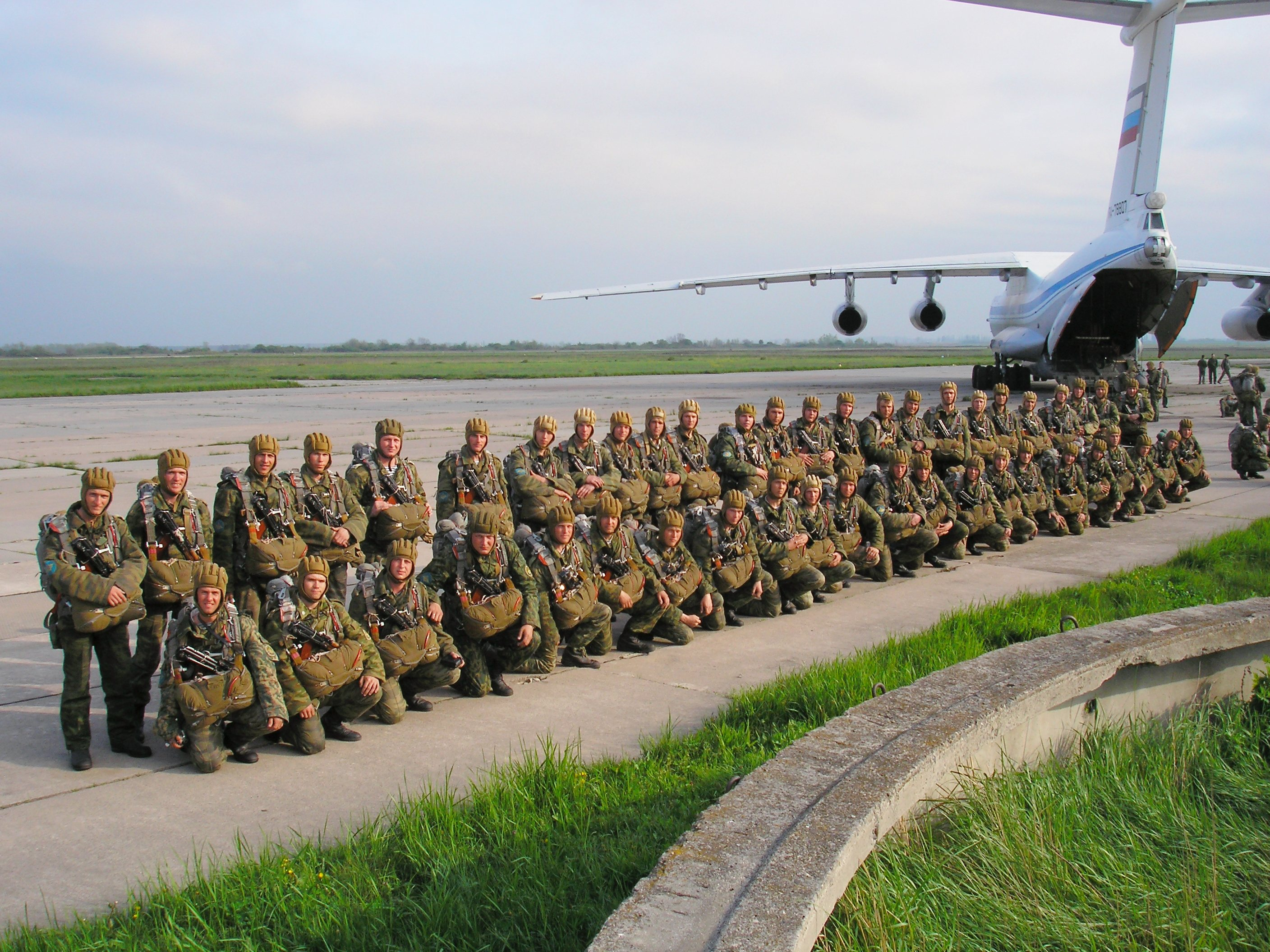
RVVDKU cadets before a parachute jump, 2008.

On the basis of the Order of the People's Commissar for Military Affairs No. 743, on 29 August 1918, the formation of the 1st Ryazan courses of the Red Army began; located in Ryazan, the basis of the current academy. The formation of the courses ended on 13 November 1918, with the courses being named "1st Ryazan Soviet Infantry Courses for the Command Personnel of the Red Army".

=== Civil War ===
In July 1918, mobilization into the ranks of the Red Army began. Almost weekly, a mobilized reserve was sent from Ryazan to the fronts of the civil war. Many residents of Ryazan fought on the fronts on the side of the White Army. The 1st Ryazan Soviet Infantry Courses took part in combat operations by separate units in the suppression of counter-revolutionary uprisings within the Ryazan province (October - November 1918).

The courses deployed in full force on the Southern Front in the Donetsk region to suppress the uprisings of the Cossacks, becoming part of the 1st Separate Brigade of Cadets of the 8th Division of the SF and, together with the Tambov cadets, formed a "Detachment of Ryazan and Tambov Cadets." As part of the 2nd Moscow Brigade, cadets took part in hostilities on the Caucasian Front in Dagestan from August 1920 to March 1921. As part of the 3rd Moscow Brigade of Cadets - on the Southern Front against Pyotr Wrangel from October to November 1920. In the same year, the courses took part in full force in the suppression of the Antonov uprising in the Tambov province in the districts of the Kirsanovsky district.

By order of the RVSR No. 1227 of June 29, 1920, the 1st Ryazan Soviet Infantry Courses were renamed "30th Soviet Infantry Courses". By order of the RVSR No. 2900 of December 31, 1920, the 30th Soviet infantry course was renamed into the 15th Ryazan Infantry School (normal type). The Tambov Infantry School combined with the Ryazan school on 1 October 1924, from which the banner of the All-Russian Central Executive Committee was transferred (presented to a detachment of Ryazan and Tambov cadets, and kept in Tambov). The Ryazan school was renamed the Ryazan Infantry School on 9 October. On 12 January 1926, the Ryazan Infantry School was granted the honorific title "Kliment Voroshilov", becoming the “Ryazan Infantry School Comrade Voroshilov".

=== Interwar Years ===
On 16 March 1931, by Order of the Revolutionary Military Council of the USSR No. 023, the school became part of the building of the Moscow Military District. On 16 March 1937, by order of the People's Commissariat of Defense of the Soviet Union No. 36, the Ryazan Infantry School Comrade Voroshilov was renamed "Ryazan Infantry School named after Comrade Voroshilov". On 26 March 1938, by order of the same comissariat No. 81, the school was removed from the structure of the university.

== World War II ==
On February 26, 1940, by Directive of the Military Council of the Moscow Military District No. 13321, the school transferred from the normal type of training to a six-month period.

As a result of the Axis invasion of the USSR, the Ryazan Infantry School was transferred to Ivanovo on 25 October 1941; returning to Ryazan on 15 February 1942. The Ryazan Infantry School began the training of 500 platoon commanders for the Berling Army on 1 August 1943. On 20 September, a Berling Army officer cadet school was formed for 1,000 cadets with a training period of 3 months. The Ryazan Infantry School was awarded the Order of the Red Banner on 12 November of the same year (No. 71600), being renamed "Ryazan Red Banner Infantry School named after K.E. Voroshilov" (Decree of the Presidium of the Supreme Soviet of the USSR of 12.11.43). In December 1943, one battalion of Romanian nationality, numbering 500 people, was included in the personnel of the school.

On 9 April 1944, the Polish branch (282 cadets) was placed at the disposal of the head of the united Polish military school in Ryazan (the reorganized 1st Moscow Machine Gun School). At the same time, a branch of Czechoslovak nationality was being formed on a preparation period of 3 months. On 1 July 1944, the school introduced two-year training courses.

== Post-War History ==
On 15 September 1946, the Ryazan Infantry School switched to 3-year training courses. For cadets lacking a general secondary education, a preparatory class was introduced.

=== Going Airborne ===
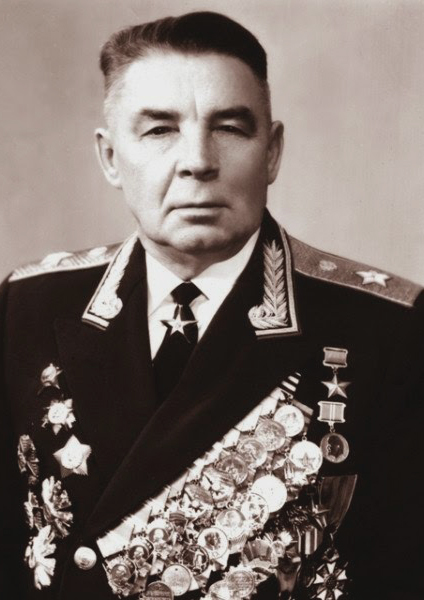
General Vasiliy Filippovich Margelov, Hero of the Soviet Union and father of the Soviet Airborne Forces.

On 24 September 1947, 7 lieutenants who completed the 3-year course were sent to the military parachute school in Frunze. Later, a number of graduates were sent to the Airborne Forces: on 7 October 1948, 61 out of 194 lieutenants commissioned into the airborne; on 21 September 1949, 26 out 103 lieutenants; on 20 February 1950, 22 out of 191 lieutenants, and later on 21 September, 22 out of 180 lieutenants; on 5 September 1951, 22 out of 218 lieutenants; and on 9 September 1952, 3 lieutenants out of 350 graduates.

On 18 March 1954 the school was renamed again, now as the Ryazan Red Banner School "Marshal K.E. Voroshilov". The school became the Ryazan Red Banner Higher Military Command School on 17 August 1958. The airborne school, formerly located in Alma Ata in Kazakhstan, merged with the Ryazan Higher Military Command School on 4 March 1959; the school then added a platoon leaders' training course to its curriculum. In August 1959, the then Deputy Commander of the Airborne Forces, Lieutenant-General Vasily F. Margelov was appointed chairman of the final examination commission and, on its graduation parade the following year, with Margelov in attendance, out of 129 new officers commissioned were 119 with Airborne Forces unit assignments and wore the sky blue shoulder boards of said branch. With the majority of its alumni officers being posted to the Airborne Forces, the school was renamed as the Ryazan Order of the Red Banner Higher Airborne School on 23 March 1964.

=== Foreign Courses ===
With the increased Soviet support for North Vietnam, on the basis of the General Staff Directive, a special department for the training of People's Army of Vietnam officers and NCOs was established on 1 February 1965. Already on February 26, said department was renamed into a special department for the training of military personnel of the armies of non-socialist countries.

On 18 September 1971, a special department for the training of military personnel of foreign armies was included in the school.

=== Second Order of the Red Banner ===
On February 22, 1968, the school was awarded its second Order of the Red Banner and renamed the Ryazan Higher Airborne Command twice Red Banner School (Order of the USSR Ministry of Defense No. 23 dated 02.22.68).

=== Special Purpose and Museum ===
On August 29 of the same year, the school was named after the Leninist Komsomol. The school then became known as the Ryazan Higher Airborne Command Twice Red Banner School named after the Lenin Komsomol (Order of the USSR Ministry of Defense No. 213 of 08.29.68). In 1969, on the basis of the Directive of the General Staff, a company of special purpose cadets (9th company) was formed at the school. On 20 March 1969, the Airborne Forces Museum was added in the service units of the school, and on 28 July 1972, the grand opening of the Museum of the History of the Airborne Forces and the School took place. The museum became the center of military-patriotic education of cadets and youth of Ryazan.

Since 1985, 4th year cadets mountain field trips; first on the basis of the 104th Airborne Division, stationed in the Azerbaijan Soviet Socialist Republic, and since 1993, on the basis of the 7th Airborne Division in Novorossiysk.

== Post-Soviet period ==
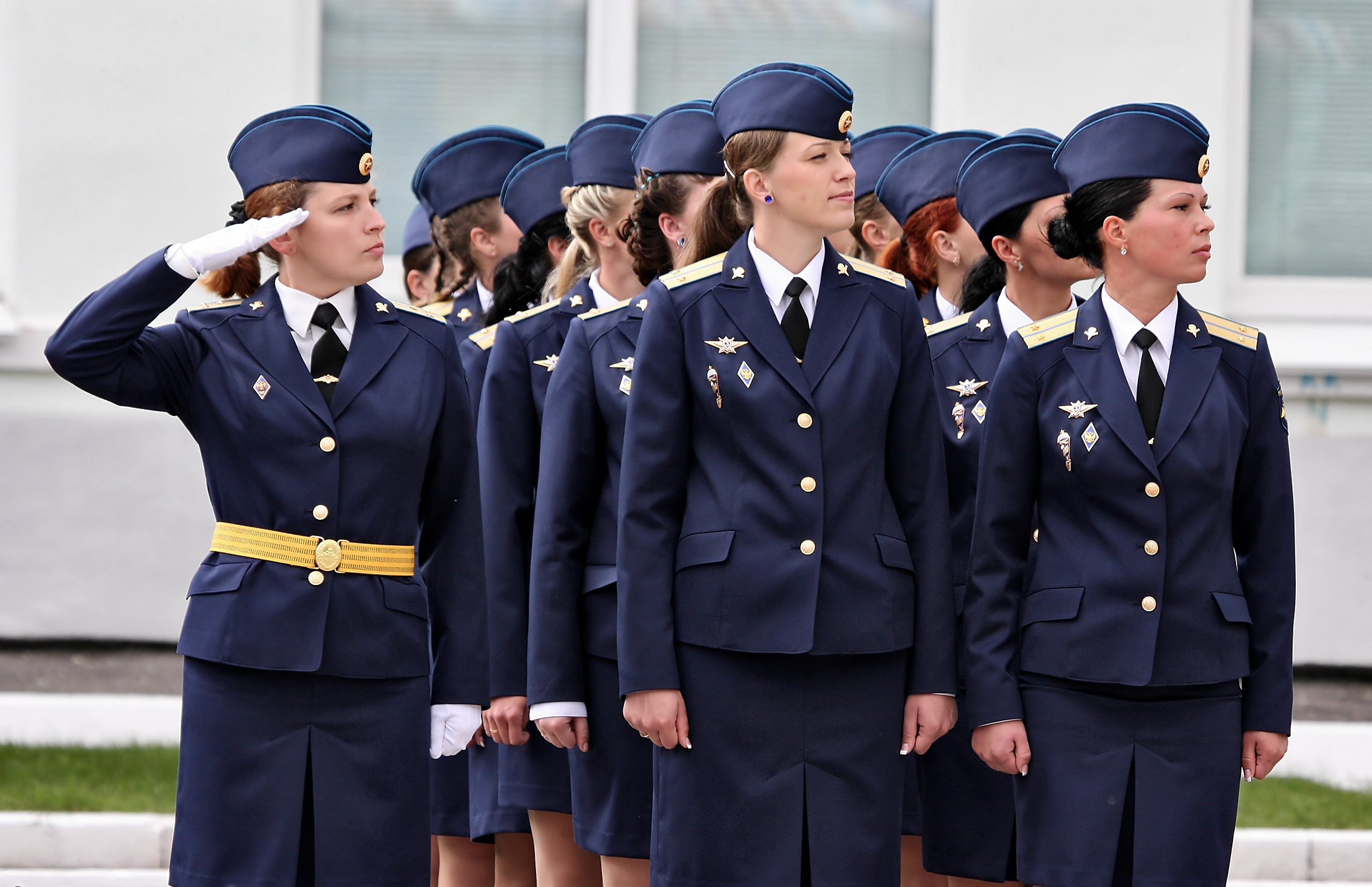
Graduation of the first group of female Kursants of the RVVDKU, 2013.

In August 1994, the school switched to a five-year term of study. At the same time, a battalion of cadets (Spetsnaz) was transferred to the Novosibirsk Higher Combined Arms Command School.

A monument to Vasily Margelov was erected on 13 November 1995. On 12 November 1996, by order of the President of the Russian Federation (then Boris Yeltsin) No. 535-RP, the school was given an honorary name: Ryazan Higher Airborne Command Twice Red Banner School named after General of the Army V.F. Margelov.

On 31 October 1998, the school was renamed as the Ryazan Institute of Airborne Troops. On 31 December 2004 it became the Ryazan Higher Airborne Command School. On 19 June 2006, the school was awarded the pennant of the RF Ministry of Defense for courage, military valor and high combat training.

The Ryazan Military Automobile Institute and Ryazan Higher Military Command School of Communications were created on 17 December 2009. On 12 September 2013, in accordance with the order of the Government of the Russian Federation No. 895-r, dated 3 June 2013, the school became independent and subordinate to the Commander of the Airborne Forces, then General Vladimir Shamanov, a graduate from the Ryazan Airborne School.

== Heads since 1991 ==
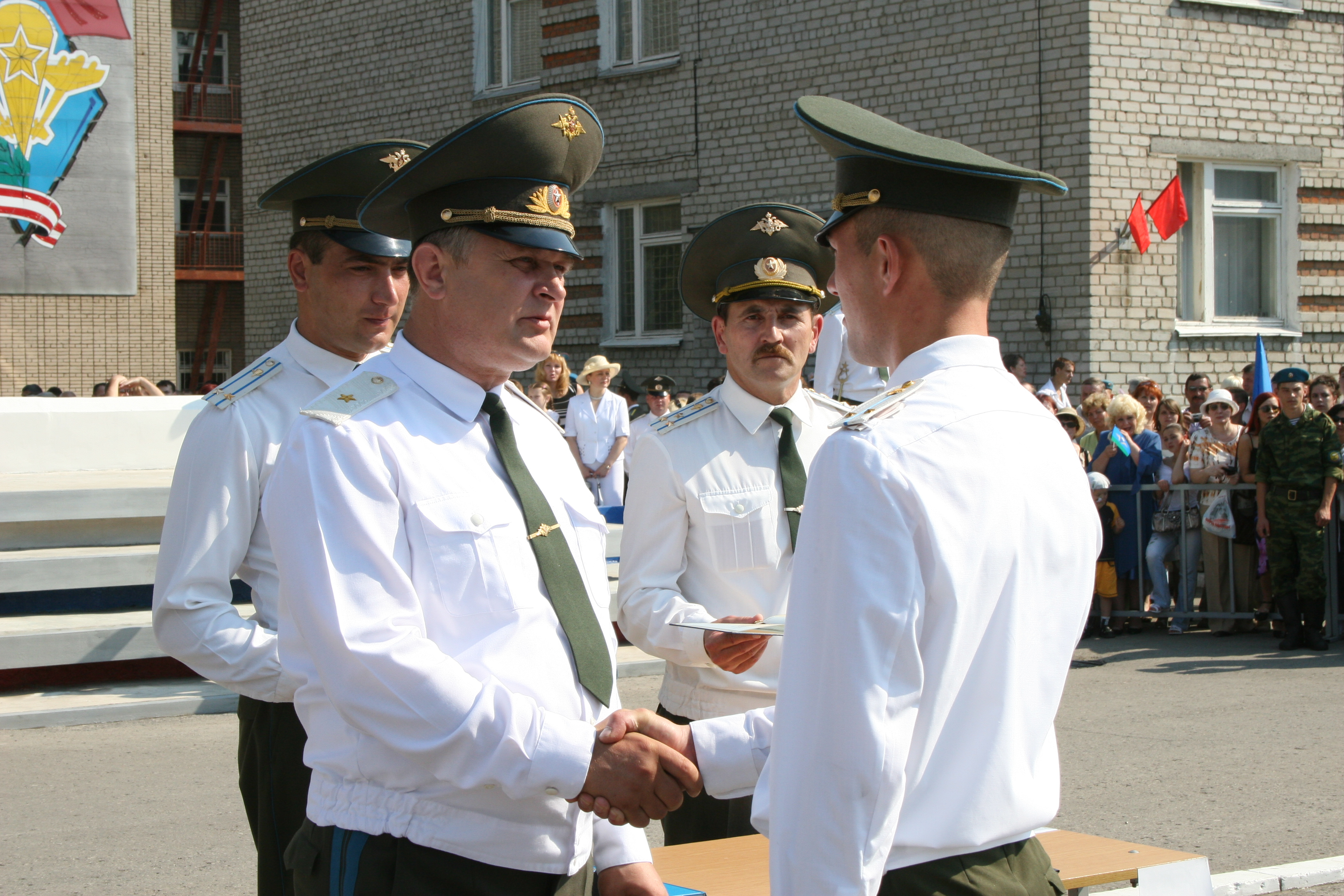
Major General Vladimir Krymsky at the graduation of officers in 2006.

- Lieutenant General Albert Slyusar (17 December 1995 – 17 December 2001)
- Major General Valery Shcherbak (17 December 2001—10 February 2008)
- Major General Vladimir Krymsky (10 February-6 May 2008)
- Colonel Vladimir Lugovoy (6 May 2008—December 2009)
- Colonel Andrey Krasov (1 January 2010 – 27 January 2012)
- Major General Anatoly Kontsevoy (14 September 2012-September 2017)
- Major General Alexei Ragozin (September 2017-May 2020)
- Major General Ruslan Yevdokimov (May 2020-May 2024)

== Famous Graduates ==
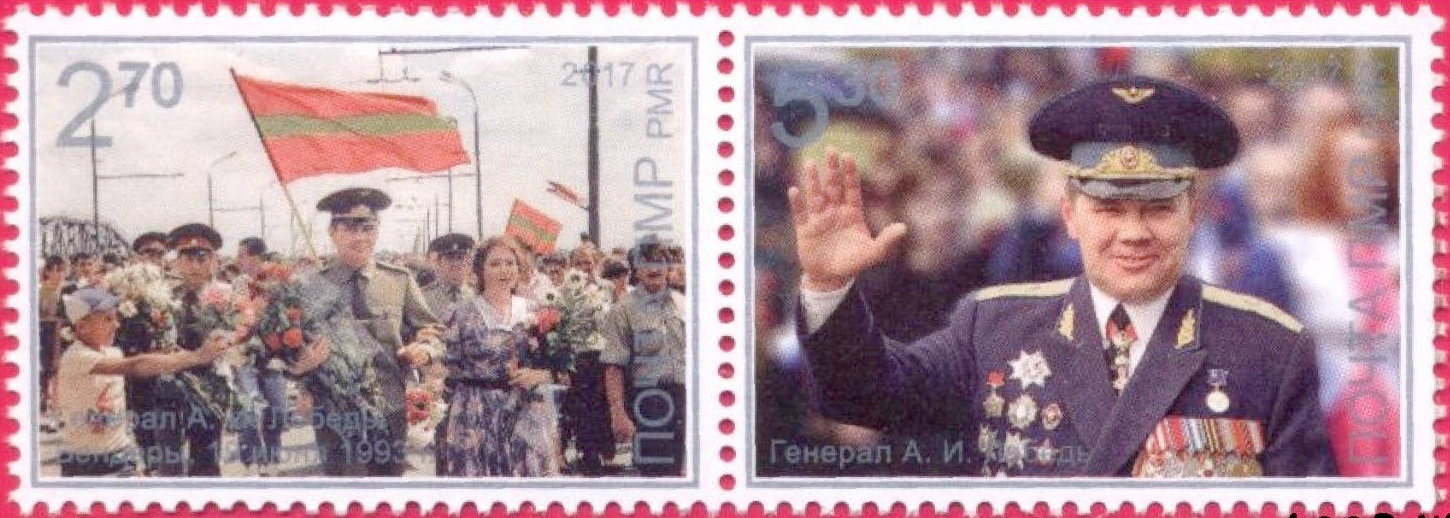
Stamp of Transnistria depicting the school graduate General Alexander Lebed in 2017. The airborne general was very popular with both military and civilian circles in Russia.

The school's track record in relation to its alumni includes 53 individuals awarded the title of Hero of the Soviet Union, 85 individuals awarded the title of Hero of Russia, and thousands of cavaliers of military orders. Among the notable graduates are:

- Alexander Lebed – Governor of Krasnoyarsk Krai from 1998 to 2002, and veteran of the Soviet-Afghan War.
- Amadou Toumani Touré – President of Mali from 2002 to 2012.
- Anatoly Bibilov – The incumbent President of South Ossetia.
- Andrey Bocharov – Governor of Volgograd Oblast.
- Artur Tiganik – Former Commander of the Estonian Land Forces.
- Ivan Gošnjak – The Federal Secretary of People's Defence of Yugoslavia from 1953 to 1967.
- Levan Sharashenidze – Defense Minister of Georgia (1992).
- Vladimir Shamanov – Commander of the VDV from 2009 to 2016) and head of the State Duma Defense Committee.
- Pavel Grachev – Defence Minister of the Russian Federation from 1992 to 1996, and overall commander in the First Battle of Grozny.
- Valery Asapov – The most senior Russian officer to be killed in action during the Syrian Civil War.
- Viktor Astapov – Deputy Commander-in-Chief of the Russian Navy.
- Yevgeni Nikolayevich Andreyev – A colonel in the Soviet Air Force who set an official record for the longest free-fall parachute jump.
- Vyacheslav Alekseevich Bocharov - A colonel who served with the VDV in Afghanistan and later took part in the Beslan Siege, as an FSB Vympel employee. He carried several wounded hostages out of the school gym and later was wounded in his face. He was awarded as Hero of Russia and his bust was sculpted and placed at the Ryazan hall of heroes.
- Ivan Tertel – Chairman of the KGB of Belarus.

== Honors and traditions ==
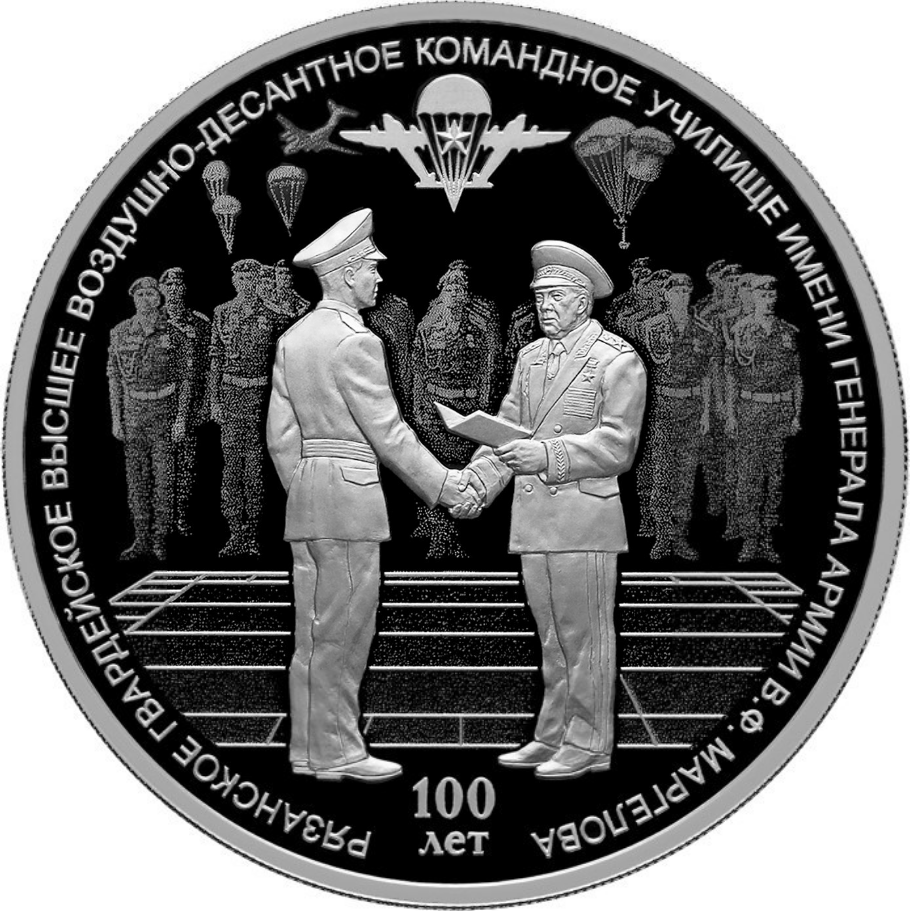
Commemorative silver coin of 3 rubles of the 100th anniversary of the school.

The school was awarded the Order of Suvorov on 14 November 2013. On 30 July 2018, the Bank of Russia issued a 3-ruble commemorative silver coin in honor of the centennial year of the school, with the denomination “100th Anniversary of the Ryazan Guards Higher Airborne Order of Suvorov of the Twice Red Banner Command School named after General of the Army V.F. Margelov".

On 29 March 2008, president Dmitry Medvedev, on the basis of the Decree of the President of the Russian Federation of 29 December 2007 (then Vladimir Putin), granted the school's regimental colours with two ribbons of the Order of the Red Banner.

=== Guards status ===
On 18 February 2018, to mark both the centennial Defenders of the Fatherland Day and the centennial of the modern Russian Armed Forces, as well as the centennial year of the foundation of the school, the Prime Minister of Russia Dmitry Medvedev, acting on behalf of President Vladimir Putin, in his capacity as Supreme Commander of the Russian Armed Forces and in the name of the Government of Russia, granted the school and its Regiment of Cadets a singular privilege among all educational institutions of the Armed Forces as the first ever school to be granted guards unit status, in honor of the sacrifices of the men and women of the academy and its thousands of graduate alumni in service as part of the Airborne Forces of the former Soviet Union and of the current Russian Federation for over six decades.

=== Individual units ===
The guard of honor of cadets of the school represent the school and the Airborne Forces at celebrations. Many cadets in the guard are master of sports in military-applied sports. In 2020, it took part in the virtual Spasskaya Tower Military Music Festival and Tattoo at the Main Cathedral of the Russian Armed Forces for the first time.

== Gallery ==
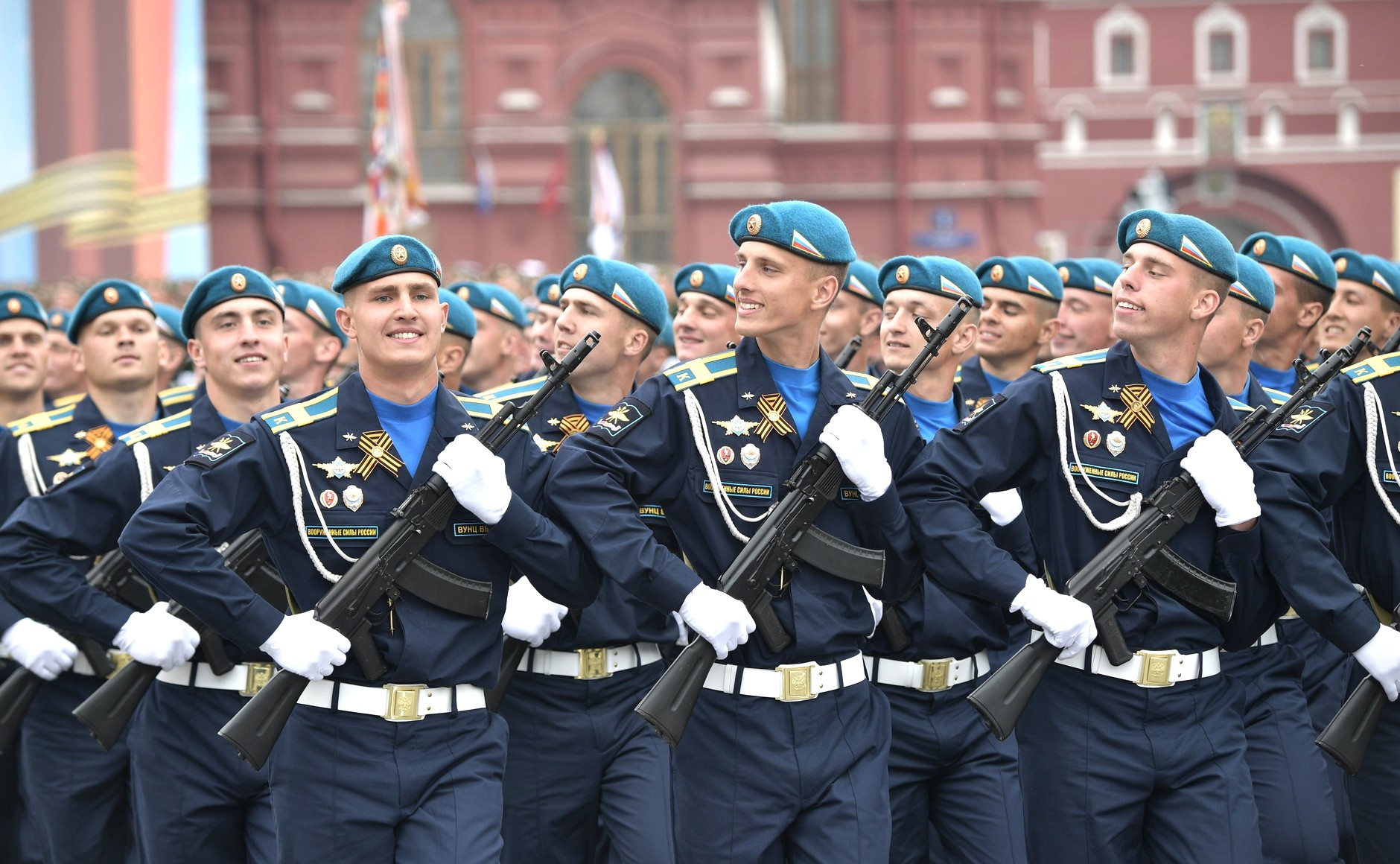
The Air Force cadets marching on Red Square.

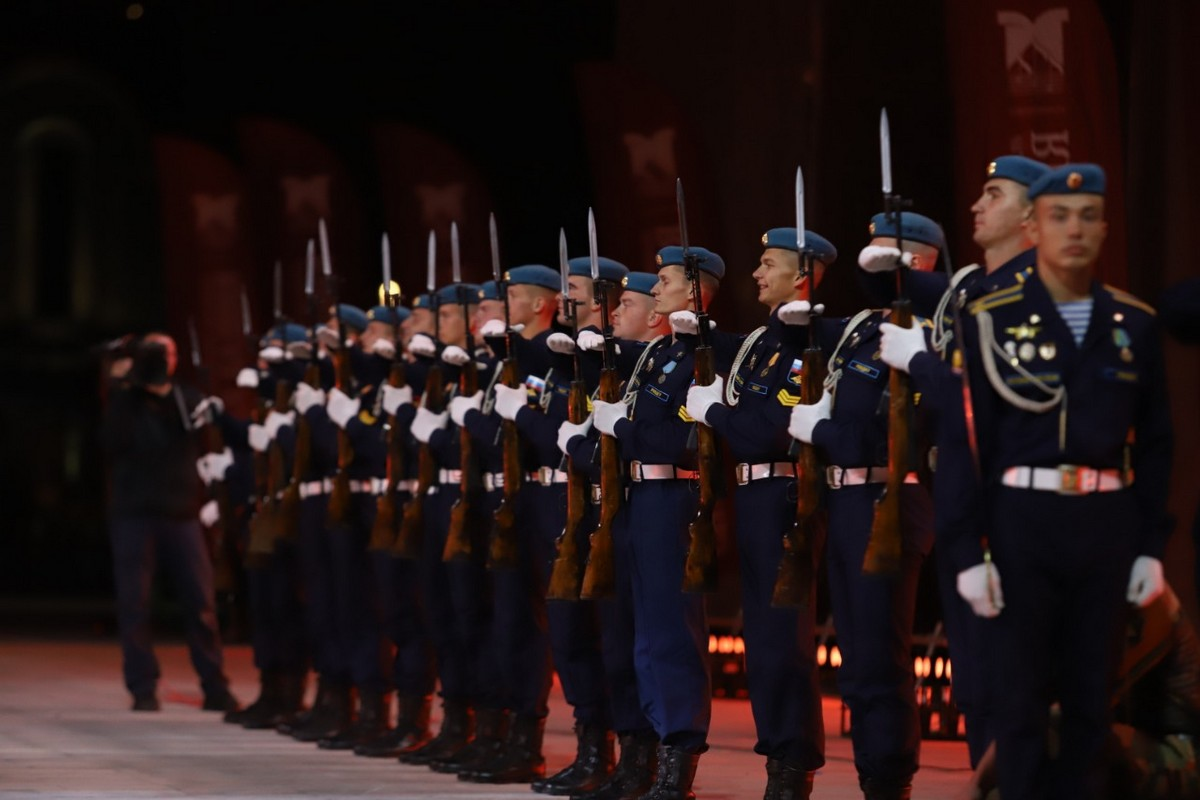
The guard of honour at the Main Cathedral of the Russian Armed Forces.

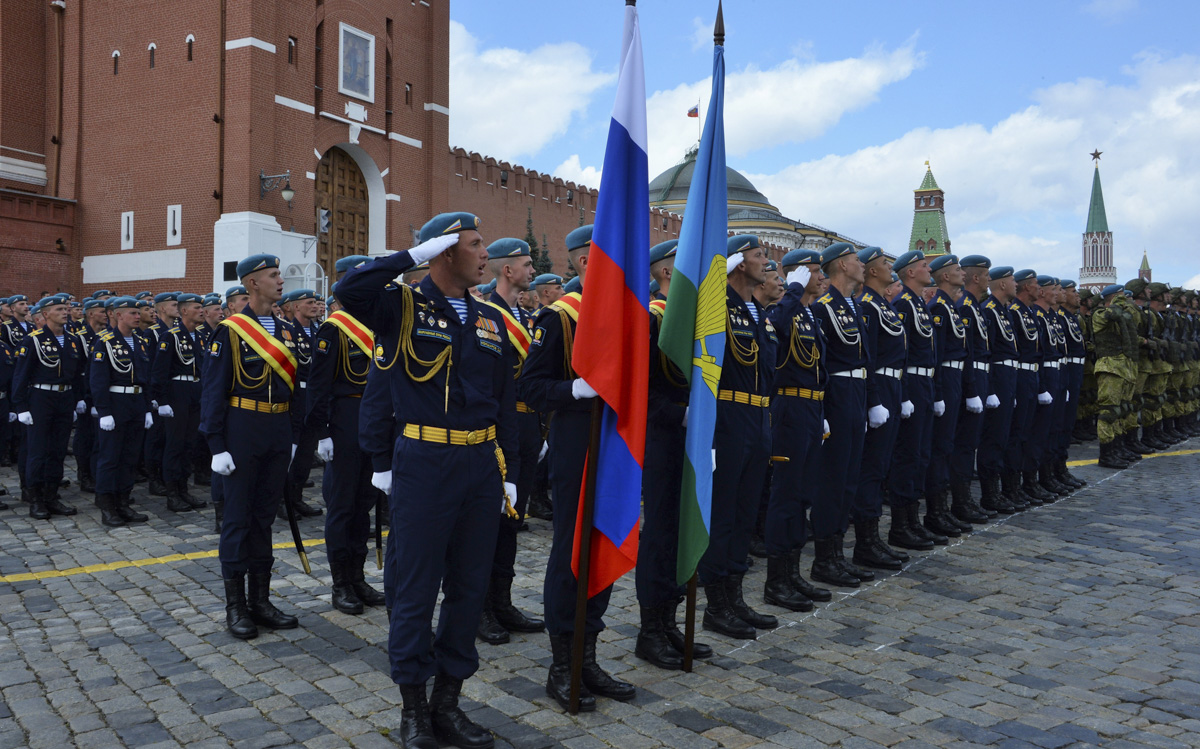
Cadets in front of the Spasskaya Bashnya on Paratroopers' Day.

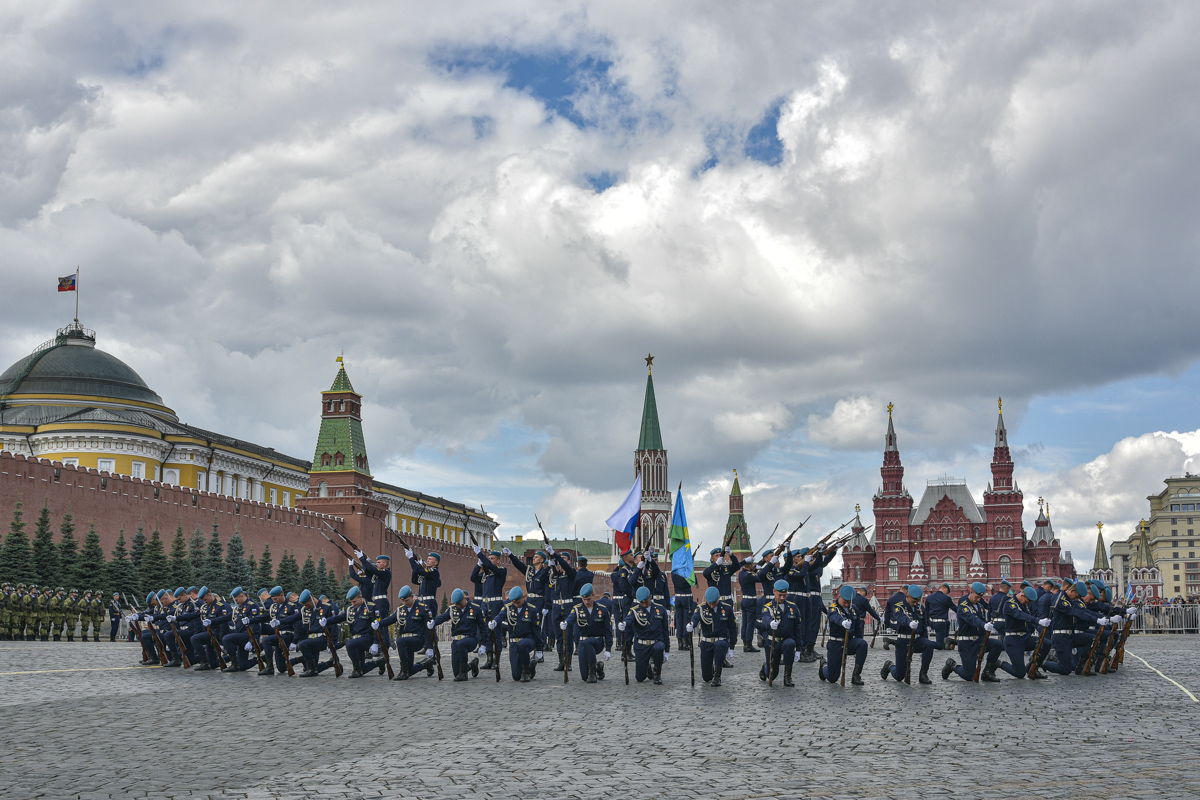
The school drill team.

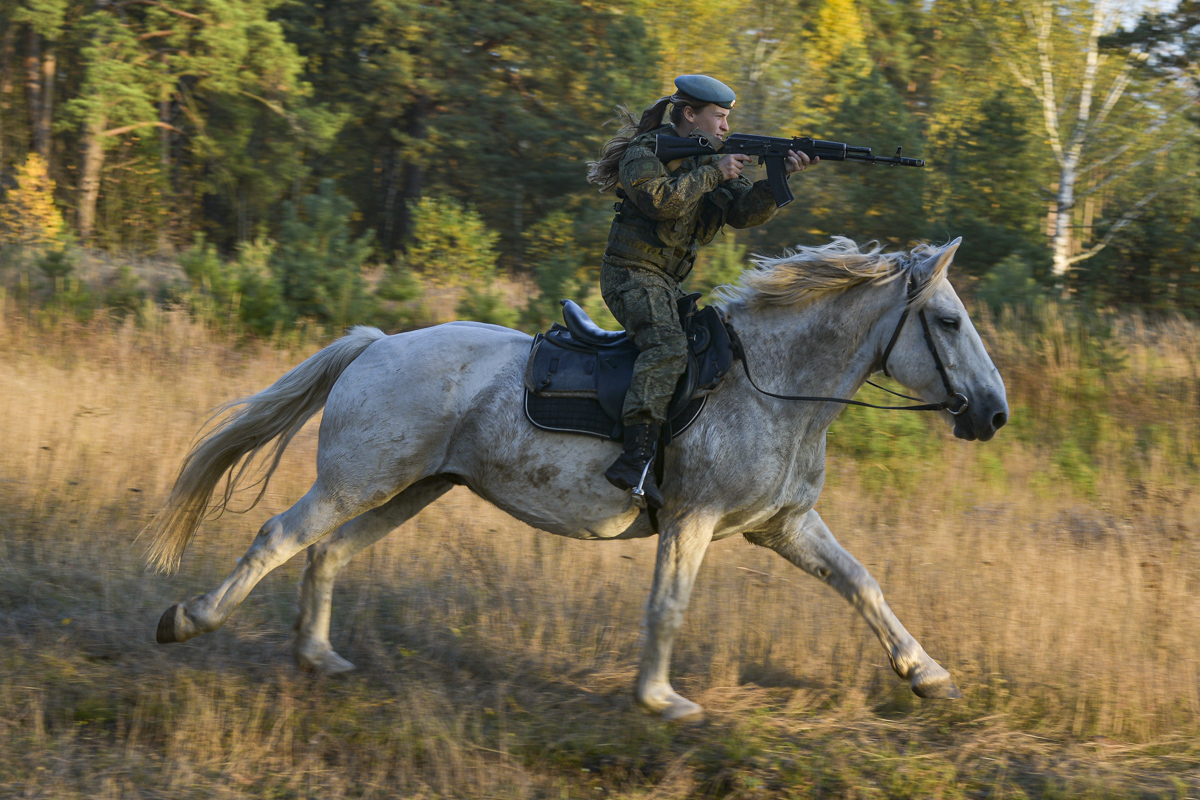
Equestrian courses at the school.

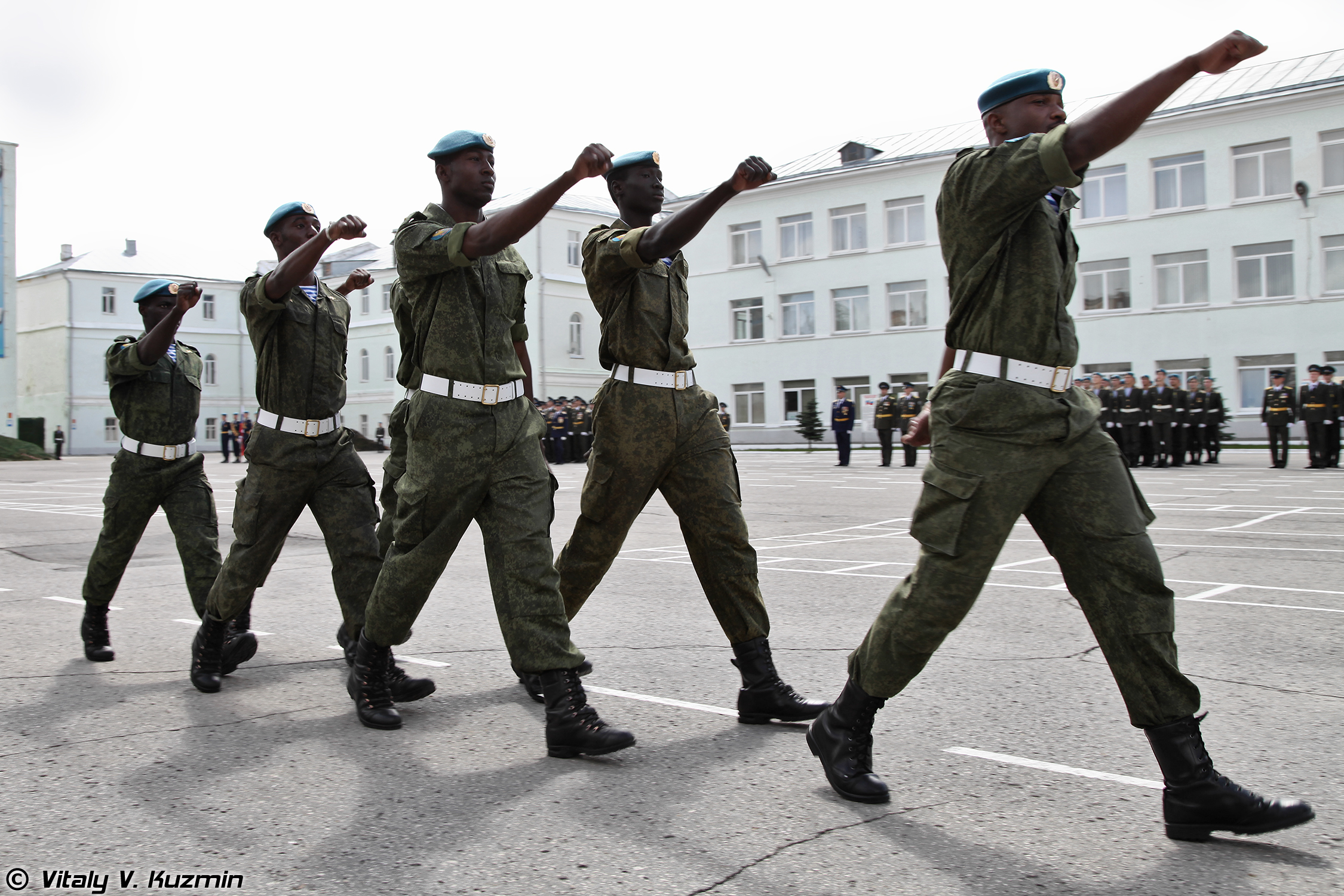
African cadets at the school.

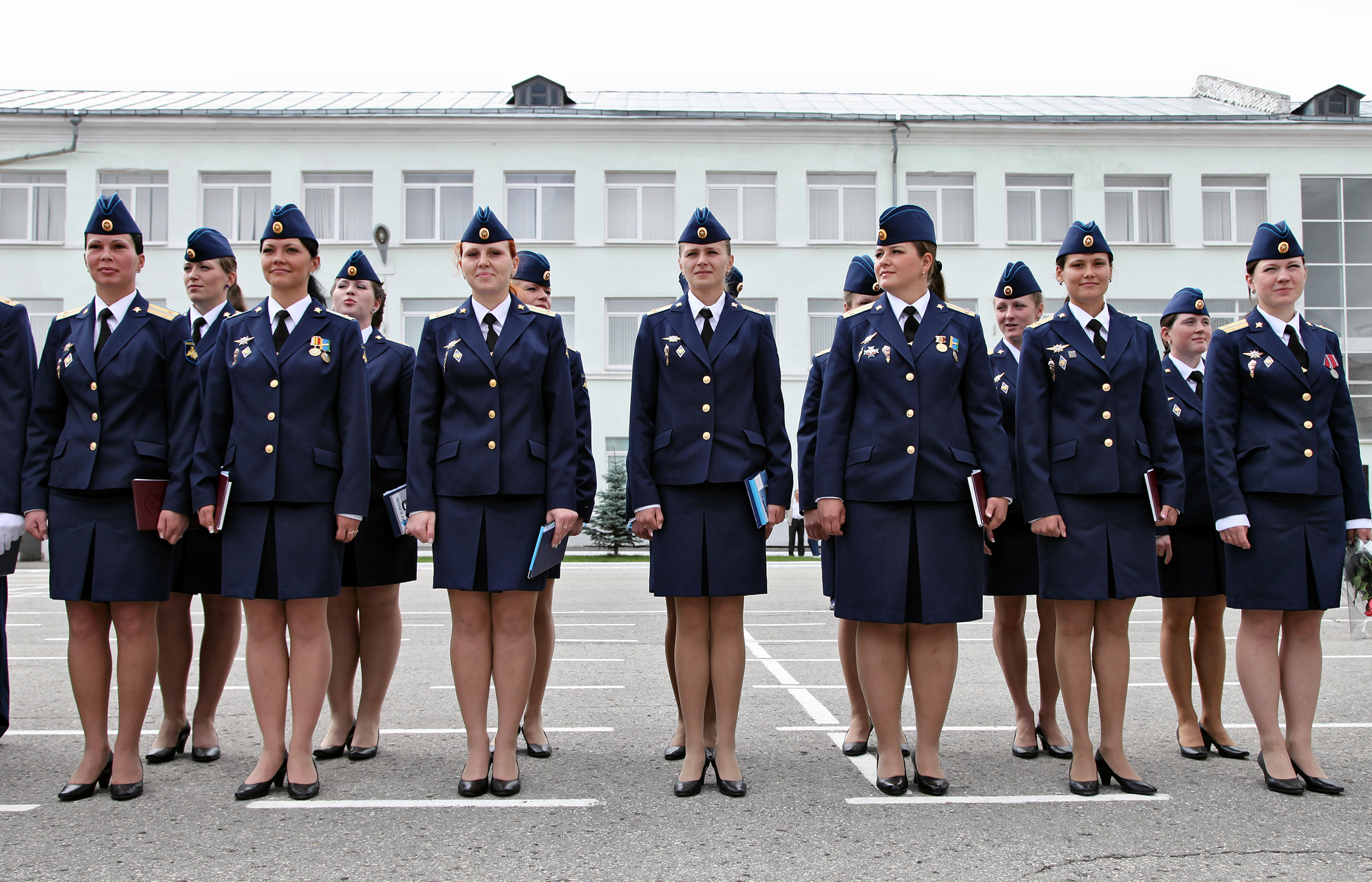
Female cadets of the school.

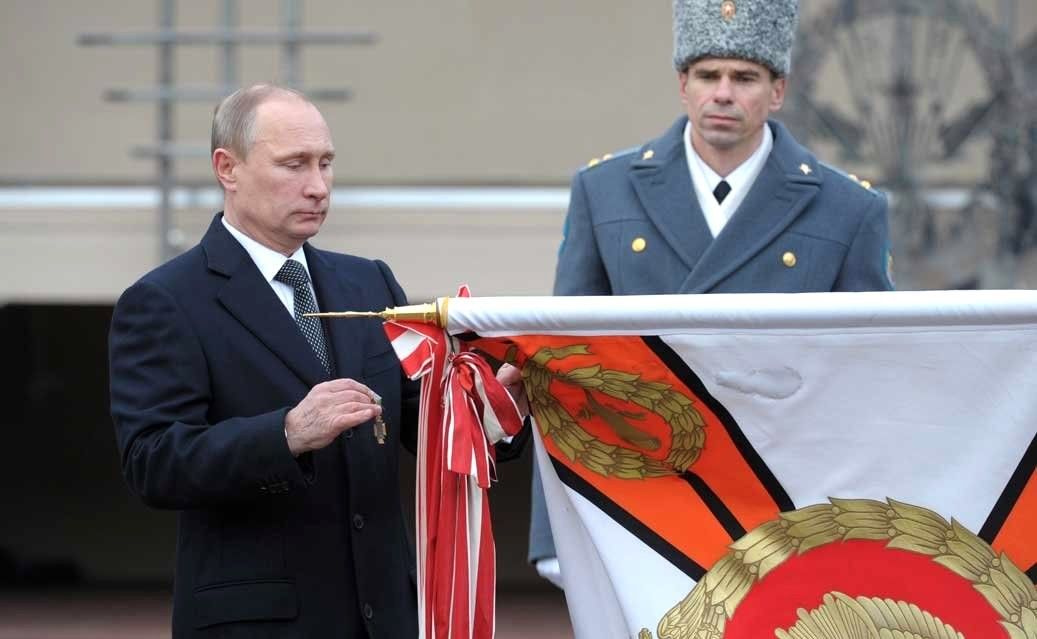
Vladimir Putin with the banner of the school.

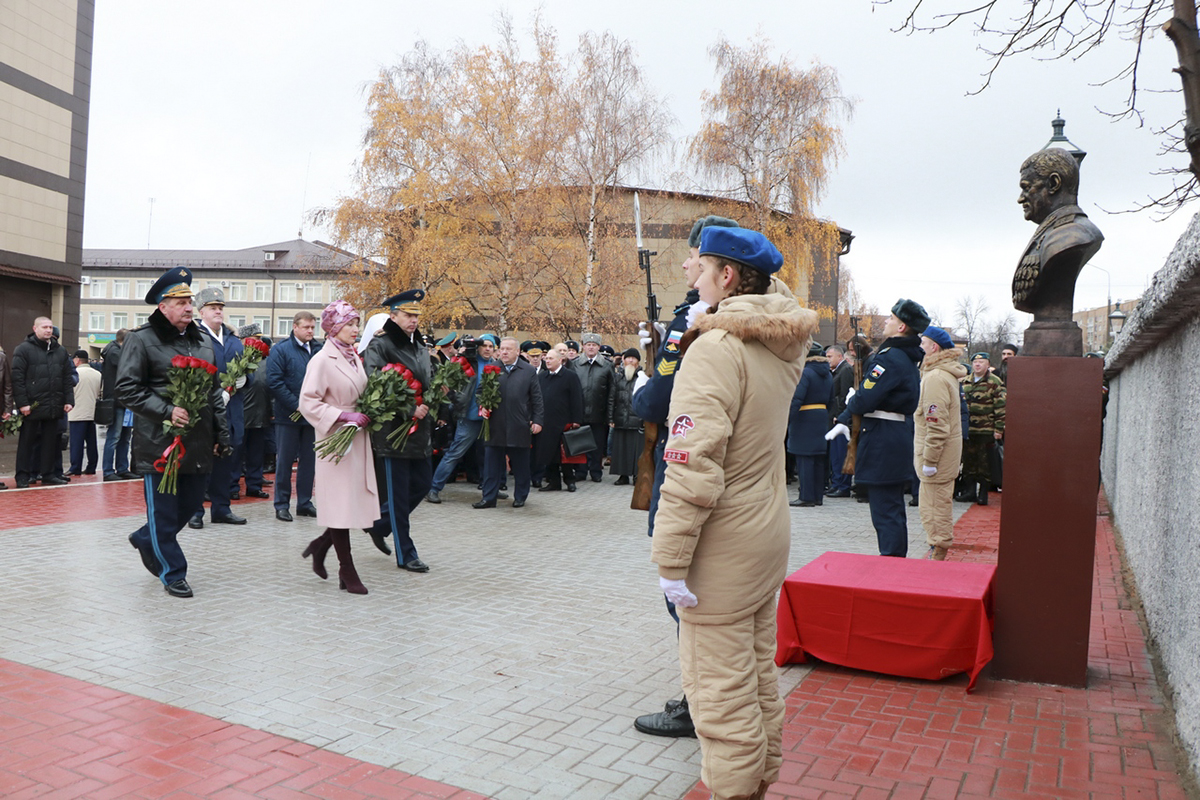
Valery Asapov at the Margelov memorial at the school.
