= Ryazansky District =

Location of Moscow in Russia

Location of Ryazan Oblast in Russia

Ryazansky District is the name of several administrative and municipal districts in Russia:

- Ryazansky District, Moscow, a district in South-Eastern Administrative Okrug of Moscow
- Ryazansky District, Ryazan Oblast, an administrative and municipal district of Ryazan Oblast

== See also ==
- Ryazansky (disambiguation)
