= Shatsky District =

Shatsky District Шацкий район (Russian)
- District
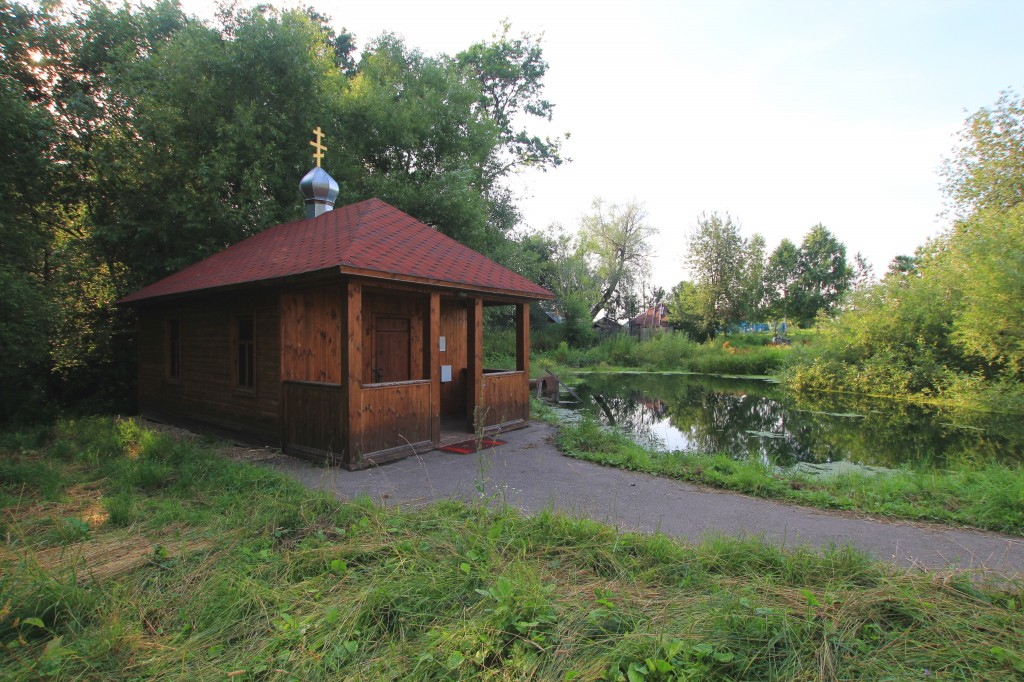
- Font in selo "Cossack Duke", Shatsky District

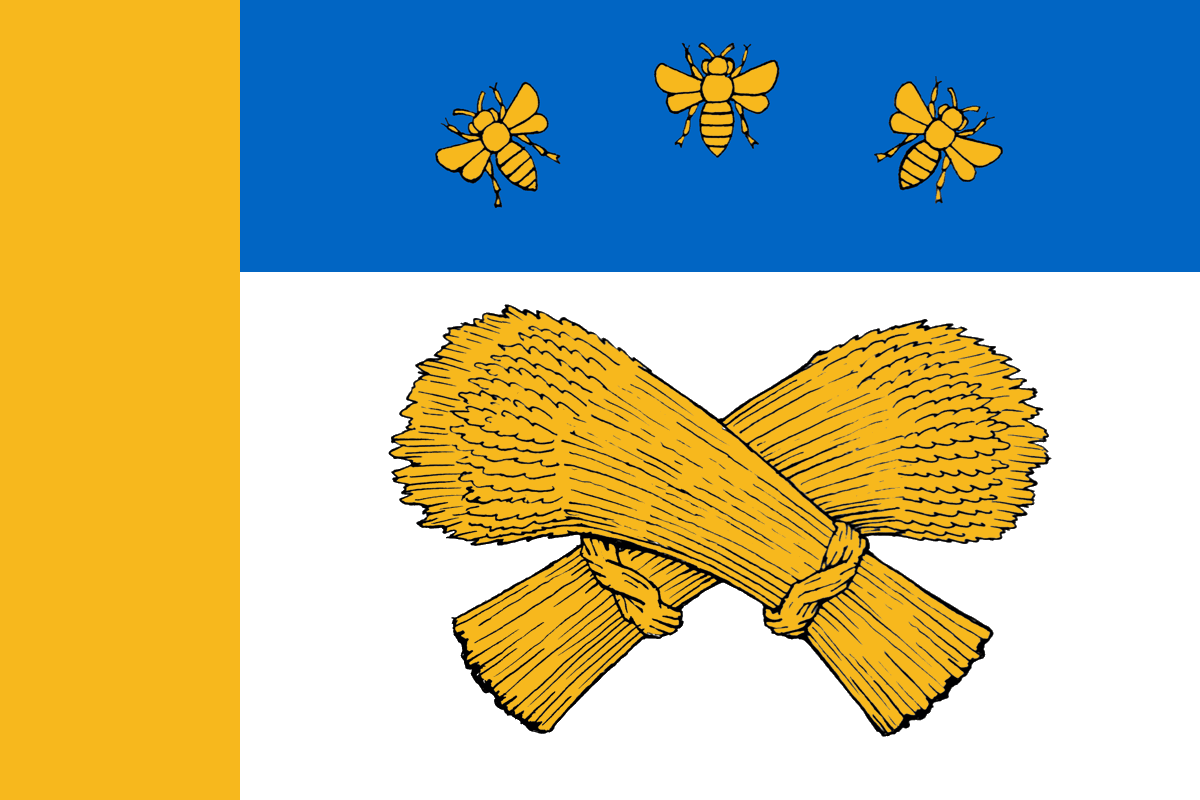
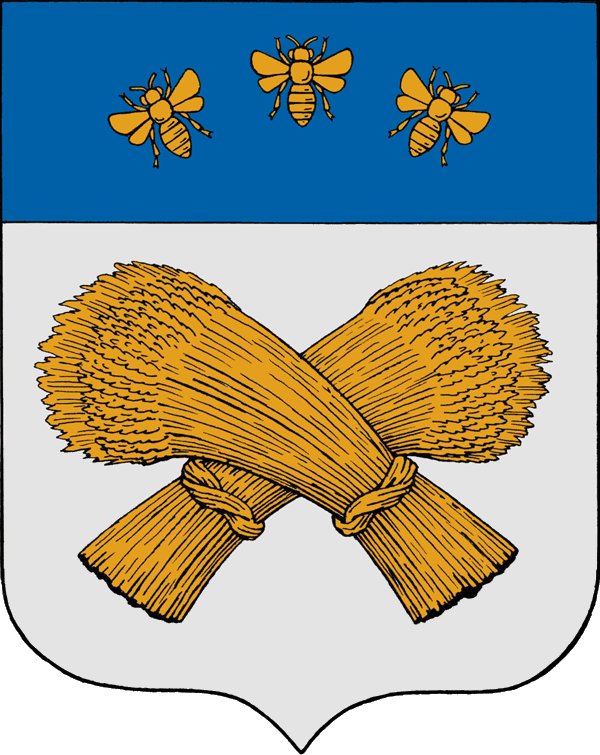
- Flag Coat of arms
- Location of Shatsky District in Ryazan Oblast
- Coordinates: 54°01′N 41°42′E
- Country: Russia
- Federal subject: Ryazan Oblast
- Established: 12 July 1929
- Administrative center: Shatsk

Area
  - Total: 2,400 km^{2} (930 sq mi)

Population (2010 Census)
  - Total: 24,414
  - Density: 10/km^{2} (26/sq mi)
  - Urban: 26.9%
  - Rural: 73.1%

Administrative structure
  - Administrative divisions: 1 Towns of district significance, 28 Rural okrugs
  - Inhabited localities: 1 cities/towns, 130 rural localities

Municipal structure
  - Municipally incorporated as: Shatsky Municipal District
  - Municipal divisions: 1 urban settlements, 19 rural settlements
- Time zone: UTC+3 (MSK)
- OKTMO ID: 61656000
- Website: http://www.admshack.ru/

Shatsky District (Russian: Ша́цкий райо́н) is an administrative and municipal district (raion), one of the twenty-five in Ryazan Oblast, Russia. It is located in the southeast of the oblast. The area of the district is 2,400 square kilometers (930 sq mi). Its administrative center is the town of Shatsk. Population: 24,414 (2010 Census); 30,944 (2002 census); 38,109 (1989 Soviet census). The population of Shatsk accounts for 26.9% of the district's total population.

== Notable residents ==
- Gennadi Bogachyov (born 1945 in Shatsk), stage and film actor
- Ivan Zakharkin (1889–1944), Soviet Army commander during World War II
