= Sasovo, Ryazan Oblast =

Town in Ryazan Oblast, Russia

Sasovo Сасово
- Town

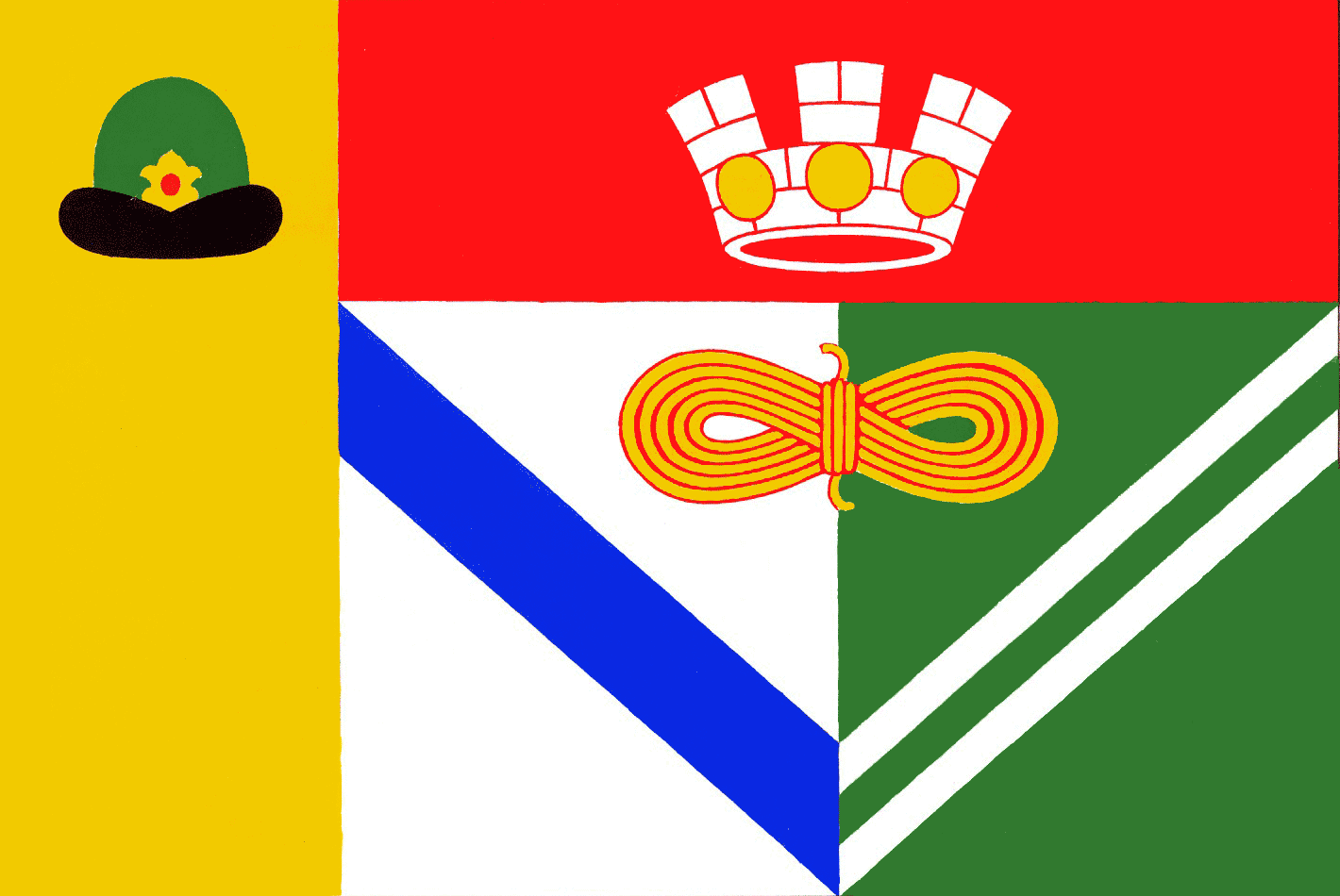
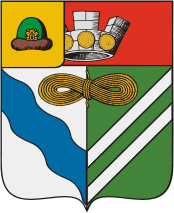
- Flag Coat of arms
- Interactive map of Sasovo
- Location of Sasovo Sasovo (Europe) Sasovo (Russia)
- Coordinates: 54°21′N 41°55′E
- Country: Russia
- Federal subject: Ryazan Oblast
- Founded: 1642
- Town status since: 1926
- Elevation: 105 m (344 ft)

Population (2010 Census)
  - Total: 28,118
  - Estimate (2023): 21,220 (−24.5%)

Administrative status
  - Subordinated to: town of oblast significance of Sasovo
  - Capital of: Sasovsky District, town of oblast significance of Sasovo

Municipal status
  - Urban okrug: Sasovo Urban Okrug
  - Capital of: Sasovo Urban Okrug, Sasovsky Municipal District
- Time zone: UTC+3 (MSK)
- Postal code: 391430
- OKTMO ID: 61710000001

Sasovo (Russian: Са́сово) is a town in Ryazan Oblast, Russia, located on the Tsna River (Oka's basin) 184 kilometers (114 mi) southeast of Ryazan. Population: 28,118 (2010 census); 30,736 (2002 census); 35,875 (1989 Soviet census).

== History ==
Sasovo was founded in 1642 and granted town status in 1926. In the early 17th century, the village of Sasovo was owned by the descendants of Siberian Khan Kuchum who also ruled in Kasim Khanate at that time.

== Administrative and municipal status ==
Within the framework of administrative divisions, Sasovo serves as the administrative center of Sasovsky District, even though it is not a part of it. As an administrative division, it is incorporated separately as the town of oblast significance of Sasovo—an administrative unit with the status equal to that of the districts. As a municipal division, the town of oblast significance of Sasovo is incorporated as Sasovo Urban Okrug.

== Notable people ==
- Nikolay Makarov (1914–1988), Soviet firearms designer, born in Sasovo
- Viktor Zolotov (born 1954), Director of the National Guard of Russia, born in Sasovo

== Twin towns – sister cities ==
- (Czech Republic) Luhačovice, Czechia
