= Pronsky District =

Pronsky District Пронский район (Russian)
- District
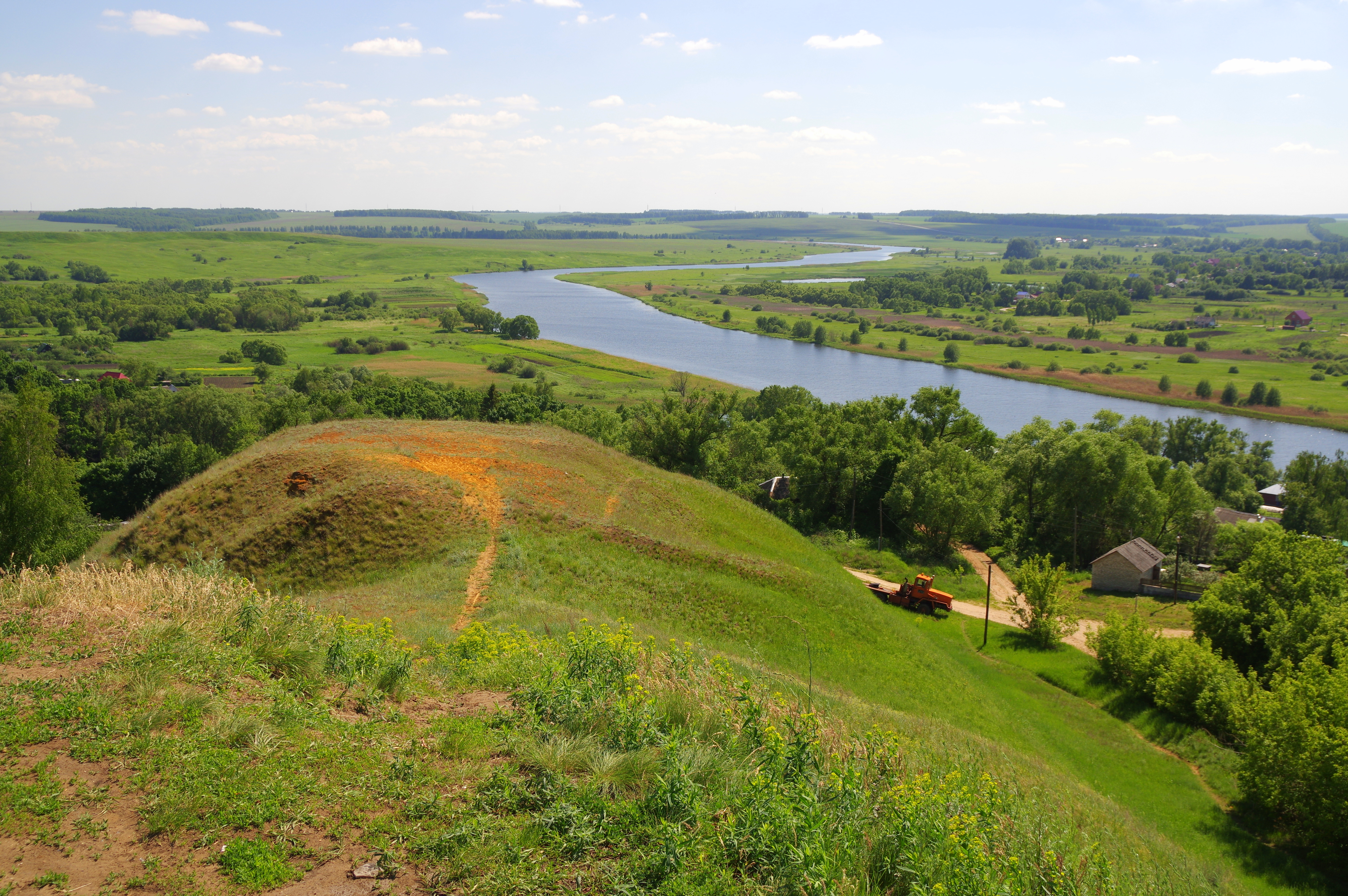
- Pronsk Fort, and view to the Proni River, Pronsky District

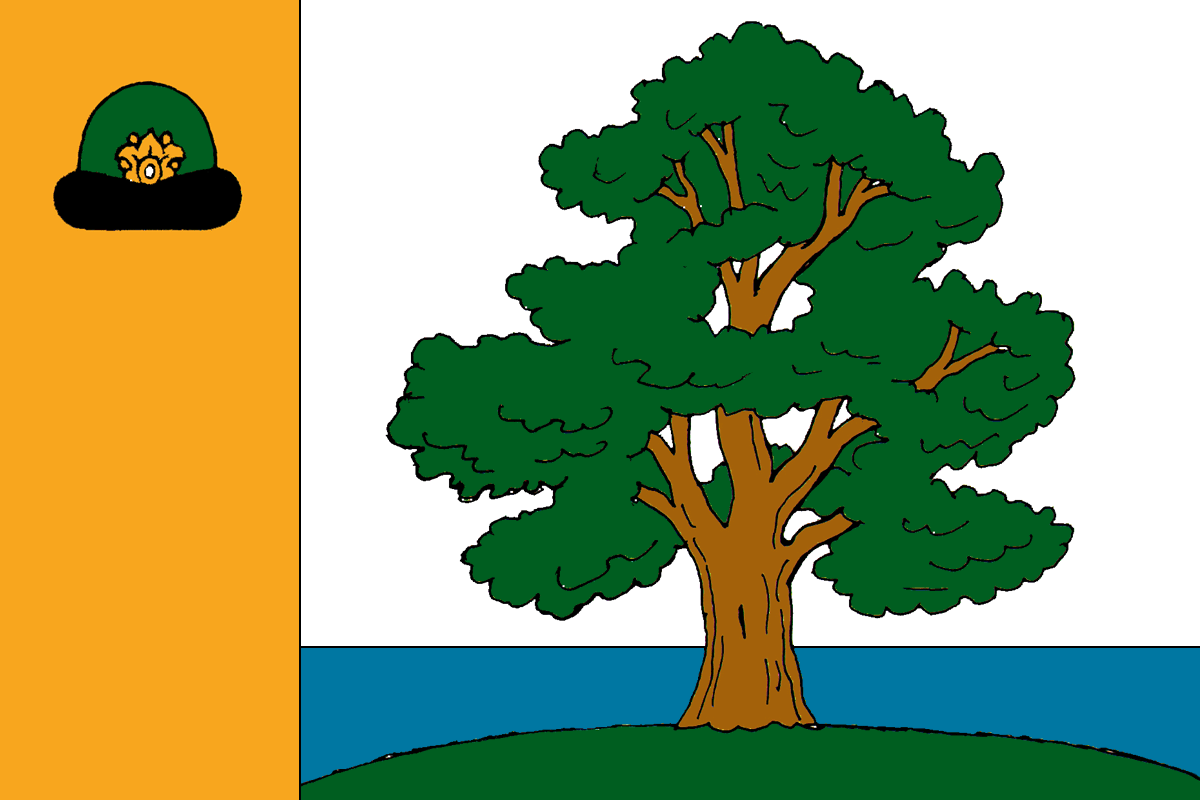
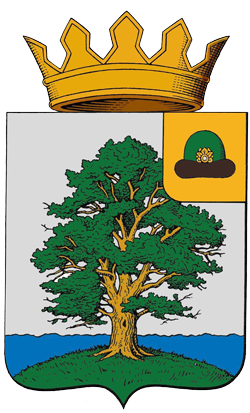
- Flag Coat of arms
- Location of Pronsky District in Ryazan Oblast
- Coordinates: 54°07′02″N 39°36′48″E
- Country: Russia
- Federal subject: Ryazan Oblast
- Established: 12 July 1929
- Administrative center: Pronsk

Area
  - Total: 1,070 km^{2} (410 sq mi)

Population (2010 Census)
  - Total: 31,393
  - Density: 29.3/km^{2} (76.0/sq mi)
  - Urban: 74.1%
  - Rural: 25.9%

Administrative structure
  - Administrative divisions: 1 Towns of district significance, 1 Work settlements, 12 Rural okrugs
  - Inhabited localities: 1 cities/towns, 1 urban-type settlements, 74 rural localities

Municipal structure
  - Municipally incorporated as: Pronsky Municipal District
  - Municipal divisions: 2 urban settlements, 6 rural settlements
- Time zone: UTC+3 (MSK)
- OKTMO ID: 61625000
- Website: https://www.adminpronsk.ru/

Pronsky District (Russian: Про́нский райо́н) is an administrative and municipal district (raion), one of the twenty-five in Ryazan Oblast, Russia. It is located in the west of the oblast. The area of the district is 1,070 square kilometers (410 sq mi). Its administrative center is the urban locality (a work settlement) of Pronsk. Population: 31,393 (2010 Census); 34,467 (2002 census); 34,527 (1989 Soviet census). The population of Pronsk accounts for 12.6% of the district's total population.
