= Kadomsky District =

Kadomsky District Кадомский район (Russian)
- District
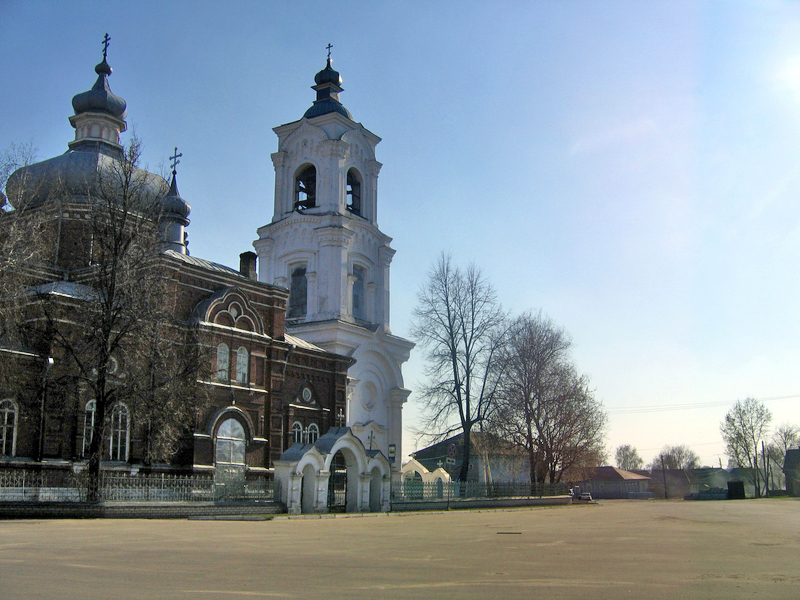
- Church in Kadom, Kadomsky District

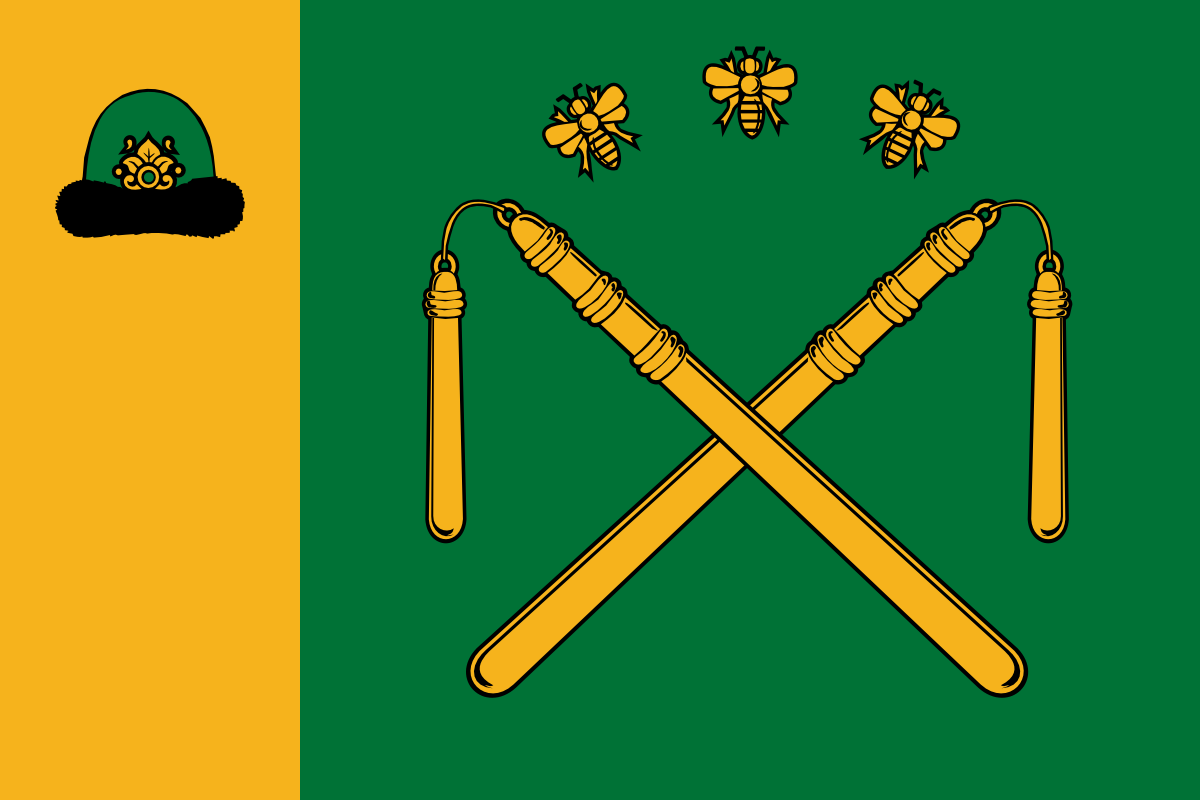
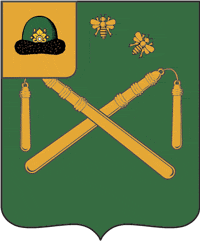
- Flag Coat of arms
- Location of Kadomsky District in Ryazan Oblast
- Coordinates: 54°34′N 42°28′E
- Country: Russia
- Federal subject: Ryazan Oblast
- Administrative center: Kadom

Area
  - Total: 986 km^{2} (381 sq mi)

Population (2010 Census)
  - Total: 8,494
  - Density: 8.61/km^{2} (22.3/sq mi)
  - Urban: 64.5%
  - Rural: 35.5%

Administrative structure
  - Administrative divisions: 1 Work settlements, 10 Rural okrugs
  - Inhabited localities: 1 urban-type settlements, 79 rural localities

Municipal structure
  - Municipally incorporated as: Kadomsky Municipal District
  - Municipal divisions: 1 urban settlements, 4 rural settlements
- Time zone: UTC+3 (MSK)
- OKTMO ID: 61606000
- Website: http://adm.kadom.ru/

Kadomsky District (Russian: Ка́домский райо́н) is an administrative and municipal district (raion), one of the twenty-five in Ryazan Oblast, Russia. It is located in the east of the oblast. The area of the district is 986 square kilometers (381 sq mi). Its administrative center is the urban locality (a work settlement) of Kadom. Population: 8,494 (2010 Census); 10,708 (2002 census); 14,328 (1989 Soviet census). The population of Kadom accounts for 64.5% of the district's total population.
