= Sasovsky District =

Sasovsky District Сасовский район (Russian)
- District
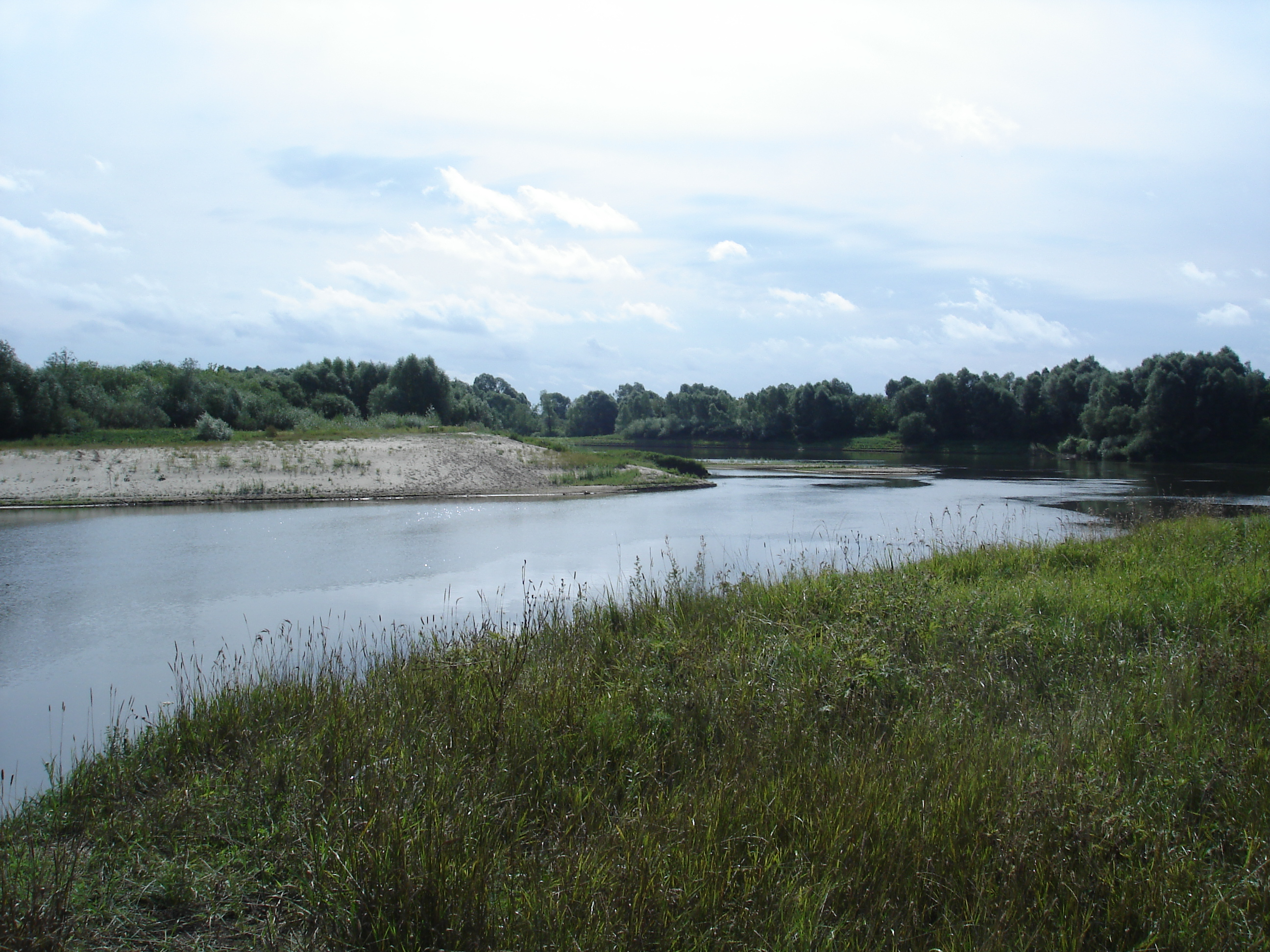
- The Moksha River separates Sasovsky and Pitelinsky Districts

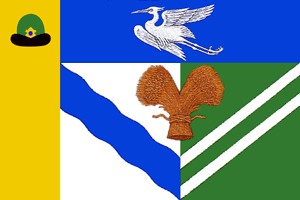
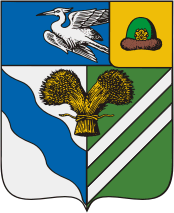
- Flag Coat of arms
- Location of Sasovsky District in Ryazan Oblast
- Coordinates: 54°21′N 41°55′E
- Country: Russia
- Federal subject: Ryazan Oblast
- Administrative center: Sasovo

Area
  - Total: 1,819 km^{2} (702 sq mi)

Population (2010 Census)
  - Total: 18,504
  - Density: 10.17/km^{2} (26.35/sq mi)
  - Urban: 0%
  - Rural: 100%

Administrative structure
  - Administrative divisions: 27 rural okrug
  - Inhabited localities: 111 rural localities

Municipal structure
  - Municipally incorporated as: Sasovsky Municipal District
  - Municipal divisions: 0 urban settlements, 15 rural settlements
- Time zone: UTC+3 (MSK)
- OKTMO ID: 61642000
- Website: http://sasovora.gov62.ru/

Sasovsky District (Russian: Са́совский райо́н) is an administrative and municipal district (raion), one of the twenty-five in Ryazan Oblast, Russia. It is located in the east of the oblast. The area of the district is 1,819 square kilometers (702 sq mi). Its administrative center is the town of Sasovo (which is not administratively a part of the district). Population: 18,504 (2010 Census); 21,012 (2002 census); 26,665 (1989 Soviet census).

== Administrative and municipal status ==
Within the framework of administrative divisions, Sasovsky District is one of the twenty-five in the oblast. The town of Sasovo serves as its administrative center, despite being incorporated separately as a town of oblast significance—an administrative unit with the status equal to that of the districts.

As a municipal division, the district is incorporated as Sasovsky Municipal District. The town of oblast significance of Sasovo is incorporated separately from the district as Sasovo Urban Okrug.
