= Starozhilovsky District =

Starozhilovsky District Старожиловский район (Russian)
- District
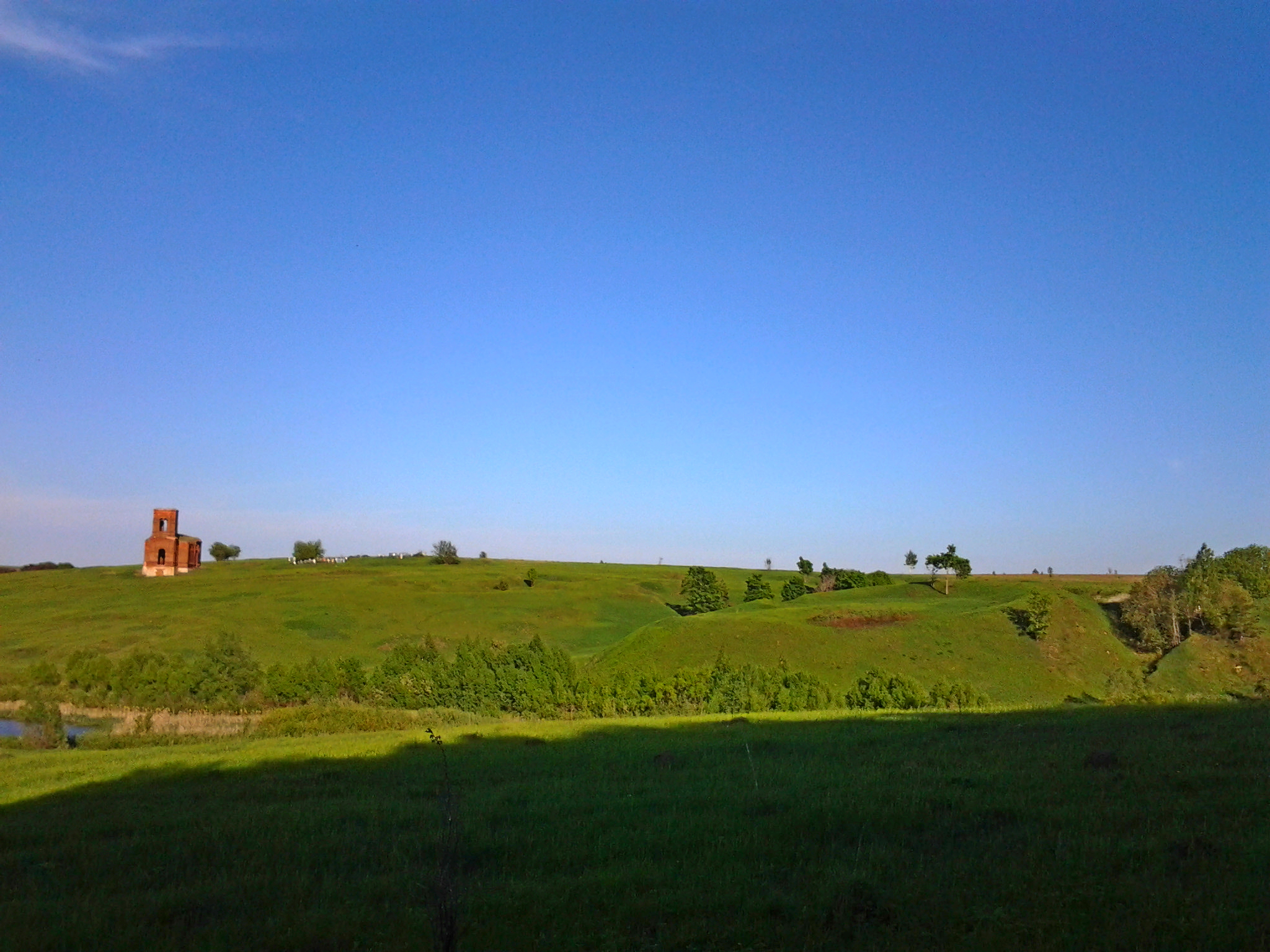
- Selo Dolmatovo, Starozhilovsky District

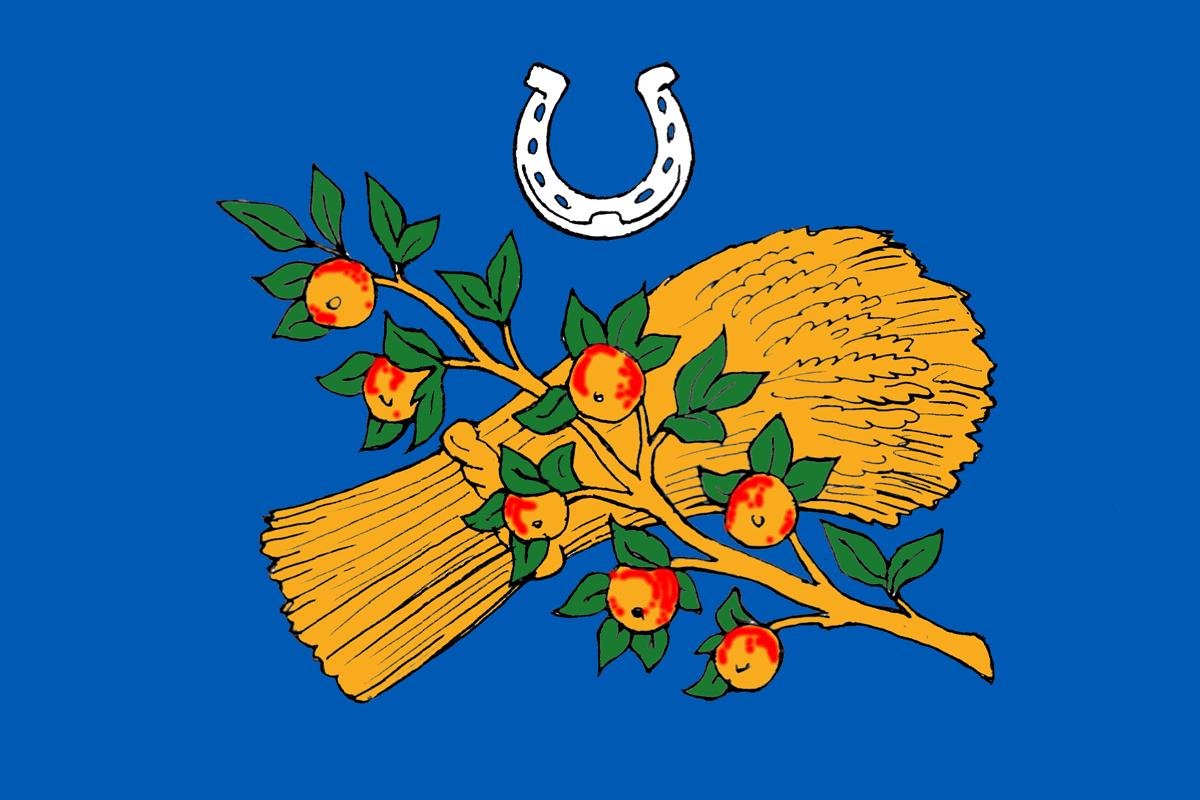
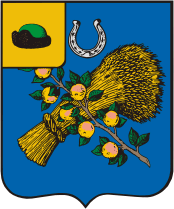
- Flag Coat of arms
- Location of Starozhilovsky District in Ryazan Oblast
- Coordinates: 54°13′42″N 39°54′41″E
- Country: Russia
- Federal subject: Ryazan Oblast
- Established: 12 July 1929
- Administrative center: Starozhilovo

Area
  - Total: 1,007 km^{2} (389 sq mi)

Population (2010 Census)
  - Total: 17,136
  - Density: 17.02/km^{2} (44.07/sq mi)
  - Urban: 29.7%
  - Rural: 70.3%

Administrative structure
  - Administrative divisions: 1 Work settlements, 10 Rural okrugs
  - Inhabited localities: 1 urban-type settlements, 105 rural localities

Municipal structure
  - Municipally incorporated as: Starozhilovsky Municipal District
  - Municipal divisions: 1 urban settlements, 6 rural settlements
- Time zone: UTC+3 (MSK)
- OKTMO ID: 61648000
- Website: http://www.admstar.ru/

Starozhilovsky District (Russian: Старожи́ловский райо́н) is an administrative and municipal district (raion), one of the twenty-five in Ryazan Oblast, Russia. It is located in the center of the oblast. The area of the district is 1,007 square kilometers (389 sq mi). Its administrative center is the urban locality (a work settlement) of Starozhilovo. Population: 17,136 (2010 Census); 17,954 (2002 census); 17,762 (1989 Soviet census). The population of Starozhilovo accounts for 29.7% of the district's total population.

== Notable residents ==
- Pyotr Gannushkin (1875–1933), psychiatrist, born in the village of Novosyolki
- Vasily Golovnin (1776–1831), navigator and Vice Admiral, born in the village of Gulyniki
