= Administrative divisions of Ryazan Oblast =

Administrative districts of Russian federal subject

Ryazan Oblast Russia
- Administrative center: Ryazan

Administrative structure (as of 2014)
- Districts: 25
- Cities/towns: 12
- Urban-type settlements: 21
- Selsovets: 462

Municipal structure (as of 2002)
- Rural settlements: 2,751 (inhabited); 196 (uninhabited)

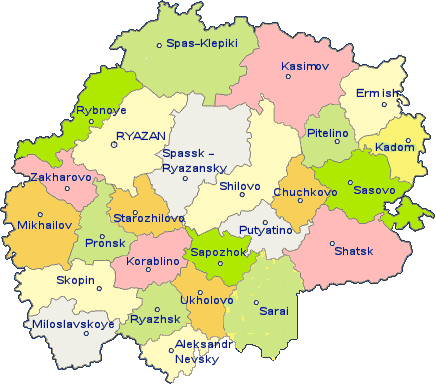
Administrative divisions of Ryazan Oblast

Ryazan Oblast is a federal subject of Russia.

== Administrative and municipal divisions ==
- Cities and towns under the oblast's jurisdiction:
  - Ryazan (Рязань) (administrative center)
    - city districts:
      - Moskovsky (Московский)
      - Oktyabrsky (Октябрьский)
      - Sovetsky (Советский)
      - Zheleznodorozhny (Железнодорожный)
  - Kasimov (Касимов)
  - Sasovo (Сасово)
  - Skopin (Скопин)
- Districts:
  - Alexandro-Nevsky (Александро-Невский)
    - Urban-type settlements under the district's jurisdiction:
      - Alexandro-Nevsky (Александро-Невский)
    - with 14 rural okrugs under the district's jurisdiction.
  - Chuchkovsky (Чучковский)
    - Urban-type settlements under the district's jurisdiction:
      - Chuchkovo (Чучково)
    - with 12 rural okrugs under the district's jurisdiction.
  - Kadomsky (Кадомский)
    - Urban-type settlements under the district's jurisdiction:
      - Kadom (Кадом)
    - with 10 rural okrugs under the district's jurisdiction.
  - Kasimovsky (Касимовский)
    - Urban-type settlements under the district's jurisdiction:
      - Gus-Zhelezny (Гусь-Железный)
      - Syntul (Сынтул)
      - Yelatma (Елатьма)
    - with 28 rural okrugs under the district's jurisdiction.
  - Klepikovsky (Клепиковский)
    - Towns under the district's jurisdiction:
      - Spas-Klepiki (Спас-Клепики)
    - Urban-type settlements under the district's jurisdiction:
      - Tuma (Тума)
    - with 23 rural okrugs under the district's jurisdiction.
  - Korablinsky (Кораблинский)
    - Towns under the district's jurisdiction:
      - Korablino (Кораблино)
    - with 20 rural okrugs under the district's jurisdiction.
  - Mikhaylovsky (Михайловский)
    - Towns under the district's jurisdiction:
      - Mikhaylov (Михайлов)
    - Urban-type settlements under the district's jurisdiction:
      - Oktyabrsky (Октябрьский)
    - with 24 rural okrugs under the district's jurisdiction.
  - Miloslavsky (Милославский)
    - Urban-type settlements under the district's jurisdiction:
      - Miloslavskoye (Милославское)
      - Tsentralny (Центральный)
    - with 17 rural okrugs under the district's jurisdiction.
  - Pitelinsky (Пителинский)
    - Urban-type settlements under the district's jurisdiction:
      - Pitelino (Пителино)
    - with 11 rural okrugs under the district's jurisdiction.
  - Pronsky (Пронский)
    - Towns under the district's jurisdiction:
      - Novomichurinsk (Новомичуринск)
    - Urban-type settlements under the district's jurisdiction:
      - Pronsk (Пронск)
    - with 12 rural okrugs under the district's jurisdiction.
  - Putyatinsky (Путятинский)
    - with 10 rural okrugs under the district's jurisdiction.
  - Ryazansky (Рязанский)
    - with 35 rural okrugs under the district's jurisdiction.
  - Ryazhsky (Ряжский)
    - Towns under the district's jurisdiction:
      - Ryazhsk (Ряжск)
    - with 16 rural okrugs under the district's jurisdiction.
  - Rybnovsky (Рыбновский)
    - Towns under the district's jurisdiction:
      - Rybnoye (Рыбное)
    - with 16 rural okrugs under the district's jurisdiction.
  - Sapozhkovsky (Сапожковский)
    - Urban-type settlements under the district's jurisdiction:
      - Sapozhok (Сапожок)
    - with 9 rural okrugs under the district's jurisdiction.
  - Sarayevsky (Сараевский)
    - Urban-type settlements under the district's jurisdiction:
      - Sarai (Сараи)
    - with 25 rural okrugs under the district's jurisdiction.
  - Sasovsky (Сасовский)
    - with 27 rural okrugs under the district's jurisdiction.
  - Shatsky (Шацкий)
    - Towns under the district's jurisdiction:
      - Shatsk (Шацк)
    - with 28 rural okrugs under the district's jurisdiction.
  - Shilovsky (Шиловский)
    - Urban-type settlements under the district's jurisdiction:
      - Lesnoy (Лесной)
      - Shilovo (Шилово)
    - with 21 rural okrugs under the district's jurisdiction.
  - Skopinsky (Скопинский)
    - Urban-type settlements under the district's jurisdiction:
      - Pavelets (Павелец)
      - Pobedinka (Побединка)
    - with 27 rural okrugs under the district's jurisdiction.
  - Spassky (Спасский)
    - Towns under the district's jurisdiction:
      - Spassk-Ryazansky (Спасск-Рязанский)
    - with 30 rural okrugs under the district's jurisdiction.
  - Starozhilovsky (Старожиловский)
    - Urban-type settlements under the district's jurisdiction:
      - Starozhilovo (Старожилово)
    - with 10 rural okrugs under the district's jurisdiction.
  - Ukholovsky (Ухоловский)
    - Urban-type settlements under the district's jurisdiction:
      - Ukholovo (Ухолово)
    - with 12 rural okrugs under the district's jurisdiction.
  - Yermishinsky (Ермишинский)
    - Urban-type settlements under the district's jurisdiction:
      - Yermish (Ермишь)
    - with 11 rural okrugs under the district's jurisdiction.
  - Zakharovsky (Захаровский)
    - with 14 rural okrugs under the district's jurisdiction.
