= Tsentralny (inhabited locality) =

Tsentralny (Russian: Центра́льный; masculine), Tsentralnaya (Центра́льная; feminine), or Tsentralnoye (Центра́льное; neuter) is the name of several inhabited localities in Russia.

Urban localities

- Tsentralny, Volodarsky District, Nizhny Novgorod Oblast, a work settlement in Volodarsky District of Nizhny Novgorod Oblast
- Tsentralny, Ryazan Oblast, a work settlement in Miloslavsky District of Ryazan Oblast

Rural localities

- Tsentralny, Altai Krai, a settlement in Tsentralnaya Settlement Administration under the administrative jurisdiction of the city of krai significance of Barnaul in Altai Krai
- Tsentralny, Zlatoust, Chelyabinsk Oblast, a settlement under the administrative jurisdiction of the City of Zlatoust in Chelyabinsk Oblast
- Tsentralny, Kartalinsky District, Chelyabinsk Oblast, a settlement in Poltavsky Selsoviet of Kartalinsky District of Chelyabinsk Oblast
- Tsentralny, Ivanovo Oblast, a selo in Shuysky District of Ivanovo Oblast
- Tsentralny, Prokopyevsky District, Kemerovo Oblast, a settlement in Safonovskaya Rural Territory of Prokopyevsky District of Kemerovo Oblast
- Tsentralny, Tashtagolsky District, Kemerovo Oblast, a settlement in Kalarskaya Rural Territory of Tashtagolsky District of Kemerovo Oblast
- Tsentralny, Tisulsky District, Kemerovo Oblast, a settlement in Tsentralskaya Rural Territory of Tisulsky District of Kemerovo Oblast
- Tsentralny, Topkinsky District, Kemerovo Oblast, a settlement in Lukoshinskaya Rural Territory of Topkinsky District of Kemerovo Oblast
- Tsentralny, Kirov Oblast, a settlement in Ozernitsky Rural Okrug of Slobodskoy District of Kirov Oblast
- Tsentralny, Buysky District, Kostroma Oblast, a settlement in Baranovskoye Settlement of Buysky District of Kostroma Oblast
- Tsentralny, Mezhevskoy District, Kostroma Oblast, a settlement in Rodinskoye Settlement of Mezhevskoy District of Kostroma Oblast
- Tsentralny, Beloglinsky District, Krasnodar Krai, a settlement in Tsentralny Rural Okrug of Beloglinsky District of Krasnodar Krai
- Tsentralny, Mostovsky District, Krasnodar Krai, a khutor in Perepravnensky Rural Okrug of Mostovsky District of Krasnodar Krai
- Tsentralny, Primorsko-Akhtarsky District, Krasnodar Krai, a settlement in Priazovsky Rural Okrug of Primorsko-Akhtarsky District of Krasnodar Krai
- Tsentralny, Krasnoyarsk Krai, a settlement in Tsentralny Selsoviet of Idrinsky District of Krasnoyarsk Krai
- Tsentralny, Republic of Mordovia, a settlement in Salazgorsky Selsoviet of Torbeyevsky District of the Republic of Mordovia
- Tsentralny, Bogorodsky District, Nizhny Novgorod Oblast, a settlement in Shapkinsky Selsoviet of Bogorodsky District of Nizhny Novgorod Oblast
- Tsentralny, Perevozsky District, Nizhny Novgorod Oblast, a settlement in Tsentralny Selsoviet of Perevozsky District of Nizhny Novgorod Oblast
- Tsentralny, Novosibirsk Oblast, an inhabited locality classified as a railway crossing loop in Krasnozyorsky District of Novosibirsk Oblast
- Tsentralny (Skalninskoye Rural Settlement), Chusovoy, Perm Krai, a settlement under the administrative jurisdiction of the town of krai significance of Chusovoy in Perm Krai; municipally, a part of Skalninskoye Rural Settlement of Chusovoy Municipal District
- Tsentralny (Nikiforovskoye Rural Settlement), Chusovoy, Perm Krai, a settlement under the administrative jurisdiction of the town of krai significance of Chusovoy in Perm Krai; municipally, a part of Nikiforovskoye Rural Settlement of Chusovoy Municipal District
- Tsentralny, Rostov Oblast, a settlement in Yuzhnenskoye Rural Settlement of Martynovsky District of Rostov Oblast
- Tsentralny, Samara Oblast, a settlement in Bogatovsky District of Samara Oblast
- Tsentralny, Tambov Oblast, a settlement in Kulikovsky Selsoviet of Morshansky District of Tambov Oblast
- Tsentralny, Tomsk Oblast, a settlement in Verkhneketsky District of Tomsk Oblast
- Tsentralny, Arsenyevsky District, Tula Oblast, a settlement in Tsentralny Rural Okrug of Arsenyevsky District of Tula Oblast
- Tsentralny, Shchyokinsky District, Tula Oblast, a settlement in Lazarevskaya Rural Administration of Shchyokinsky District of Tula Oblast
- Tsentralny, Suvorovsky District, Tula Oblast, a settlement under the administrative jurisdiction of the Urban-Type Settlement of Ageyevo in Suvorovsky District, Tula Oblast
- Tsentralny, Tyoplo-Ogaryovsky District, Tula Oblast, a settlement in Alexeyevsky Rural Okrug of Tyoplo-Ogaryovsky District of Tula Oblast
- Tsentralny, Tver Oblast, a settlement in Tsentralnoye Rural Settlement of Kimrsky District of Tver Oblast
- Tsentralny, Tyumen Oblast, a settlement in Zavodoukovsky District of Tyumen Oblast
- Tsentralny, Vladimir Oblast, a settlement in Vyaznikovsky District of Vladimir Oblast
- Tsentralny, Voronezh Oblast, a settlement in Dobrinskoye Rural Settlement of Talovsky District of Voronezh Oblast
- Tsentralnoye, Altai Krai, a selo in Tsentralny Selsoviet of Rodinsky District of Altai Krai
- Tsentralnoye, Belgorod Oblast, a selo in Sovkhozny Rural Okrug of Rakityansky District of Belgorod Oblast
- Tsentralnoye, Kurgan Oblast, a selo in Baksarsky Selsoviet of Lebyazhyevsky District of Kurgan Oblast
- Tsentralnoye, Omsk Oblast, a village in Borisovsky Rural Okrug of Sherbakulsky District of Omsk Oblast
- Tsentralnoye, Primorsky Krai, a selo in Shkotovsky District of Primorsky Krai
- Tsentralnaya, Perm Krai, a village in Sivinsky District of Perm Krai
- Tsentralnaya, Ryazan Oblast, a village in Napolnovsky Rural Okrug of Sarayevsky District of Ryazan Oblast
