= Miloslavsky =

Miloslavsky (masculine), Miloslavskaya (feminine), or Miloslavskoye (neuter) may refer to:

People

- Ilya Miloslavsky (1594–1668), Russian boyar and diplomat
- Maria Miloslavskaya (1625–1669), first wife of Tsar Alexis I of Russia
- Nikolay Miloslavsky (1811–1883), Russian actor and entrepreneur

Places

- Miloslavsky District, a district of Ryazan Oblast, Russia
- Miloslavsky (inhabited locality) (Miloslavskaya, Miloslavskoye), name of several inhabited localities in Russia

Novels

- Yury Miloslavsky (novel), a novel by Mikhail Zagoskin
