= Tsentralny =

Tsentralny (masculine), Tsentralnaya (feminine), or Tsentralnoye (neuter) may refer to:

- Tsentralny District (disambiguation), several districts in the countries of the former Soviet Union
- Tsentralny Okrug (disambiguation), various divisions in Russia
- Tsentralny Urban Settlement, a municipal formation which the Work Settlement of Tsentralny in Volodarsky District of Nizhny Novgorod Oblast, Russia is incorporated as
- Tsentralnoye Urban Settlement, a municipal formation which the Work Settlement of Tsentralny in Miloslavsky District of Ryazan Oblast, Russia is incorporated as
- Tsentralny (inhabited locality) (Tsentralnaya, Tsentralnoye), several inhabited localities in Russia
- Tsentralnyi, Luhansk Oblast (Tsentralny), an urban-type settlement in Luhansk Oblast, Ukraine
