= Korablinsky =

Korablinsky (masculine), Korablinskaya (feminine), or Korablinskoye (neuter) may refer to:

- Korablinsky District, a district in Ryazan Oblast, Russia
- Korablinskoye Urban Settlement, a municipal formation which the town of district significance of Korablino in Korablinsky District of Ryazan Oblast, Russia is incorporated as
