= Korablino =

Korablino (Russian: Кораблино) is the name of several inhabited localities in Russia.

Urban localities

- Korablino, Korablinsky District, Ryazan Oblast, a town in Korablinsky District of Ryazan Oblast; administratively incorporated as a town of district significance

Rural localities

- Korablino, Ryazansky District, Ryazan Oblast, a selo in Korablinsky Rural Okrug of Ryazansky District of Ryazan Oblast
- Korablino, Tula Oblast, a village in Korablinsky Rural Okrug of Kimovsky District of Tula Oblast
