= Tsentralny District =

Tsentralny District may refer to:

- Tsentralny District, Minsk, a city district of Minsk, Belarus
- Tsentralny District, Russia, name of several districts and city districts in Russia
- Tsentralnyi District, name of several city districts in Ukraine

== See also ==
- Tsentralny (disambiguation)
