= Ryazhsky =

Ryazhsky (masculine), Ryazhskaya (feminine), or Ryazhskoye (neuter) may refer to:

- Ryazhsky District, a district in Ryazan Oblast, Russia
- Ryazhskoye Urban Settlement, a municipal formation which the town of district significance of Ryazhsk in Ryazhsky District of Ryazan Oblast, Russia is incorporated as
