= Paninsky (inhabited locality) =

Paninsky (Russian: Панинский; masculine), Paninskaya (Панинская; feminine), or Paninskoye (Панинское; neuter) is the name of several rural localities in Russia:

- Paninsky (rural locality), a settlement in Paninsky Selsoviet of Medvensky District of Kursk Oblast
- Paninskoye, Ryazan Oblast, a selo under the administrative jurisdiction of the work settlement of Starozhilovo in Starozhilovsky District of Ryazan Oblast
- Paninskoye, Smolensk Oblast, a village in Staroselskoye Rural Settlement of Safonovsky District of Smolensk Oblast
- Paninskaya, Ivanovo Oblast, a village in Kineshemsky District of Ivanovo Oblast
- Paninskaya, Belozersky District, Vologda Oblast, a village in Paninsky Selsoviet of Belozersky District of Vologda Oblast
- Paninskaya, Kharovsky District, Vologda Oblast, a village in Kumzersky Selsoviet of Kharovsky District of Vologda Oblast
