= Sarayevsky =

Sarayevsky (masculine), Sarayevskaya (feminine), or Sarayevskoye (neuter) may refer to:

- Sarayevsky District, a district of Ryazan Oblast, Russia
- Sarayevskaya, a rural locality (a village) in Arkhangelsk Oblast, Russia
