= Starozhilovo =

Starozhilovo (Russian: Старожилово) is the name of several inhabited localities in Russia.

== Urban localities ==
- Starozhilovo, Ryazan Oblast, a work settlement in Starozhilovsky District of Ryazan Oblast

== Rural localities ==
- Starozhilovo, Krasnoyarsk Krai, a settlement in Podsosensky Selsoviet of Nazarovsky District of Krasnoyarsk Krai
