= Paninsky =

Paninsky (masculine), Paninskaya (feminine), or Paninskoye (neuter) may refer to:

- Paninsky District, a district of Voronezh Oblast, Russia
- Paninsky (inhabited locality) (Paninskaya, Paninskoye), several rural localities in Russia
