= Miloslavsky (inhabited locality) =

Set index of articles associated with the same name

Miloslavsky (Russian: Милославский; masculine), Miloslavskaya (Милославская; feminine), or Miloslavskoye (Милославское; neuter) is the name of several inhabited localities in Russia.

Urban localities

- Miloslavskoye, Ryazan Oblast, a work settlement in Miloslavsky District of Ryazan Oblast

Rural localities

- Miloslavskoye, Novgorod Oblast, a village in Rakomskoye Settlement of Novgorodsky District of Novgorod Oblast
- Miloslavskoye, Tver Oblast, a village in Pestrikovskoye Rural Settlement of Kashinsky District of Tver Oblast
- Miloslavskaya, Arkhangelsk Oblast, a village in Shangalsky Selsoviet of Ustyansky District of Arkhangelsk Oblast
- Miloslavskaya, Vologda Oblast, a village in Pokrovsky Selsoviet of Velikoustyugsky District of Vologda Oblast
