= Tsentralny District, Russia =

Central Federal District in Russia

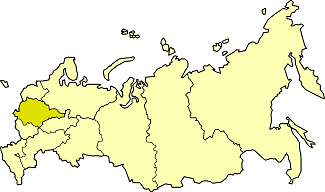
Central economic region in Russia

Location of St. Petersburg in Russia

Tsentralny District is the name of several administrative and municipal divisions in Russia. The name literally means "Central".

== Federal districts and economic regions ==
- Central Federal District (Tsentralny federalny okrug), a federal district
- Central economic region (Tsentralny ekonomichesky rayon), an economic region

== Districts of the federal subjects ==
- Tsentralny district, Saint Petersburg, an administrative district of the federal city of Saint Petersburg

== City divisions ==
1. Tsentralny city district, Barnaul, a city district of Barnaul, the administrative center of Altai Krai
2. Tsentralny city district, Bratsk, a city district of Bratsk, a city in Irkutsk Oblast
3. Tsentralny city district, Chelyabinsk, an administrative and municipal city district of Chelyabinsk, the administrative center of Chelyabinsk Oblast
4. Tsentralny administrative district, Chita, an administrative district of the city of Chita, the administrative center of Zabaykalsky Krai
5. Tsentralny administrative district, Kaliningrad, an administrative district of the city of Kaliningrad, the administrative center of Kaliningrad Oblast
6. Tsentralny city district, Kemerovo, a city district of Kemerovo, the administrative center of Kemerovo Oblast
7. Tsentralny city district, Khabarovsk, a city district of Khabarovsk, the administrative center of Khabarovsk Krai
8. Tsentralny city district, Kostroma, a city district of Kostroma, the administrative center of Kostroma Oblast
9. Tsentralny okrug, Krasnodar, an okrug of the city of Krasnodar, the administrative center of Krasnodar Krai
10. Tsentralny city district, Krasnoyarsk, a city district of Krasnoyarsk, the administrative center of Krasnoyarsk Krai
11. Tsentralny okrug, Kursk, an okrug of the city of Kursk, the administrative center of Kursk Oblast
12. Tsentralny okrug, Nazran, an okrug of the city of Nazran, a city in the Republic of Ingushetia
13. Tsentralny city district, Norilsk, a city district of Norilsk, a city in Krasnoyarsk Krai
14. Tsentralny city district, Novokuznetsk, a city district of Novokuznetsk, a city in Kemerovo Oblast
15. Tsentralny city district, Novorossiysk, a city district of Novorossiysk, a city in Krasnodar Krai
16. Tsentralny city district, Novosibirsk, a city district of Novosibirsk, the administrative center of Novosibirsk Oblast
17. Tsentralny administrative okrug, Omsk, an administrative okrug of the city of Omsk, the administrative center of Omsk Oblast
18. Tsentralny city district, Orenburg, a city district of Orenburg, the administrative center of Orenburg Oblast
19. Tsentralny city district, Prokopyevsk, a city district of Prokopyevsk, a city in Kemerovo Oblast
20. Tsentralny city district, Sochi, a city district of Sochi, a city in Krasnodar Krai
21. Tsentralny city district, Tolyatti, a city district of Tolyatti, a city in Samara Oblast
22. Tsentralny city district, Tula, a city district of Tula, the administrative center of Tula Oblast
23. Tsentralny city district, Tver, a city district of Tver, the administrative center of Tver Oblast
24. Tsentralny administrative okrug, Tyumen, an administrative okrug of the city of Tyumen, the administrative center of Tyumen Oblast
25. Tsentralny city district, Volgograd, a city district of Volgograd, the administrative center of Volgograd Oblast
26. Tsentralny city district, Voronezh, a city district of Voronezh, the administrative center of Voronezh Oblast
Cities of Russia with a city division called "Tsentralny"

== See also ==
- Tsentralny (disambiguation)
- Tsentralny okrug (disambiguation)
