= Spassky District, Ryazan Oblast =

Spassky District Спасский район (Russian)
- District
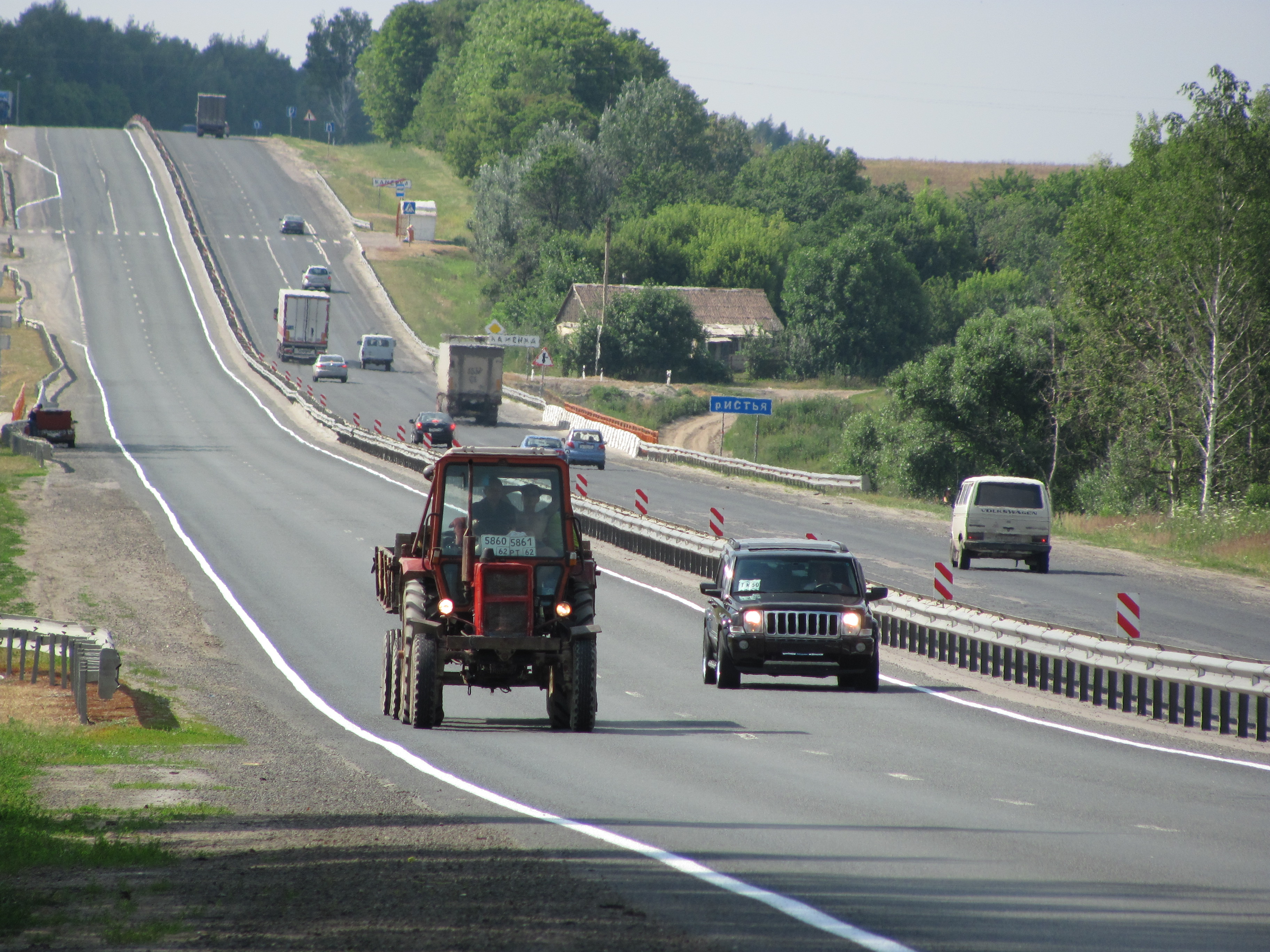
- The M5 (Ural) Highway and the bridge over the Istya River in the village of Kamenka, Spassky District

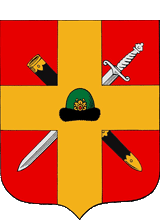
- Flag Coat of arms
- Location of Spassky District in Ryazan Oblast
- Coordinates: 54°24′N 40°23′E
- Country: Russia
- Federal subject: Ryazan Oblast
- Established: 12 July 1929
- Administrative center: Spassk-Ryazansky

Area
  - Total: 2,684 km^{2} (1,036 sq mi)

Population (2010 Census)
  - Total: 30,388
  - Density: 11.32/km^{2} (29.32/sq mi)
  - Urban: 25.5%
  - Rural: 75.4%

Administrative structure
  - Administrative divisions: 1 Towns of district significance, 30 Rural okrugs
  - Inhabited localities: 1 cities/towns, 133 rural localities

Municipal structure
  - Municipally incorporated as: Spassky Municipal District
  - Municipal divisions: 1 urban settlements, 15 rural settlements
- Time zone: UTC+3 (MSK)
- OKTMO ID: 61646000
- Website: http://www.spassk-rzn.ru/

Spassky District (Russian: Спа́сский райо́н) is an administrative and municipal district (raion), one of the twenty-five in Ryazan Oblast, Russia. It is located in the center of the oblast. The area of the district is 2,684 square kilometers (1,036 sq mi). Its administrative center is the town of Spassk-Ryazansky. Population: 30,388 (2010 Census); 34,024 (2002 census); 41,458 (1989 Soviet census). The population of Spassk-Ryazansky accounts for 25.5% of the district's total population.
