= Syntul =

Syntul Сынтул
- Urban-type settlement
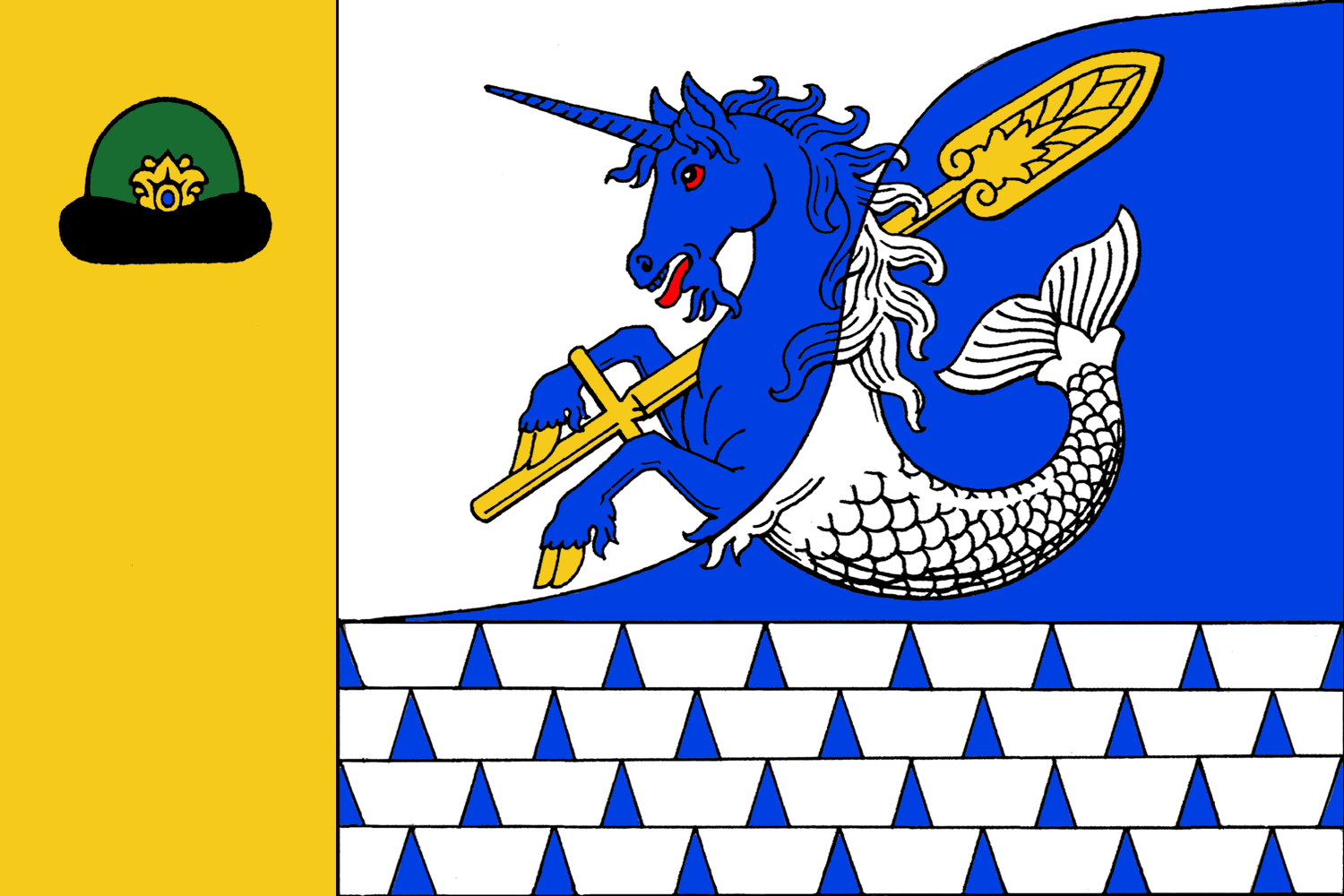
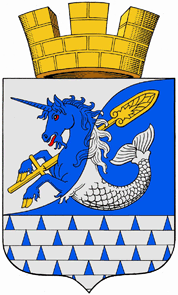
- Flag Coat of arms
- Interactive map of Syntul
- Location of Syntul Syntul (Ryazan Oblast)
- Coordinates: 54.9998°N 41.2965°E
- Country: Russia
- Federal subject: Ryazan Oblast
- Administrative district: Kasimovsky District

Population (2010 Census)
  - Total: 1,688
  - Estimate (2023): 1,551 (−8.1%)
- Time zone: UTC+3 (MSK)
- Postal code: 391338
- OKTMO ID: 61608160051

Syntul (Russian: Сы́нтул) is an urban locality (an urban-type settlement) in Kasimovsky District of Ryazan Oblast, Russia. Population: 1,688 (2010 census); 1,889 (2002 census); 2,204 (1989 Soviet census).
