= Odesa Oblast Academic Drama Theater =

Theatre in Odesa, Ukraine

Coordinates: 46°29′0.14″N 30°44′3.06″E

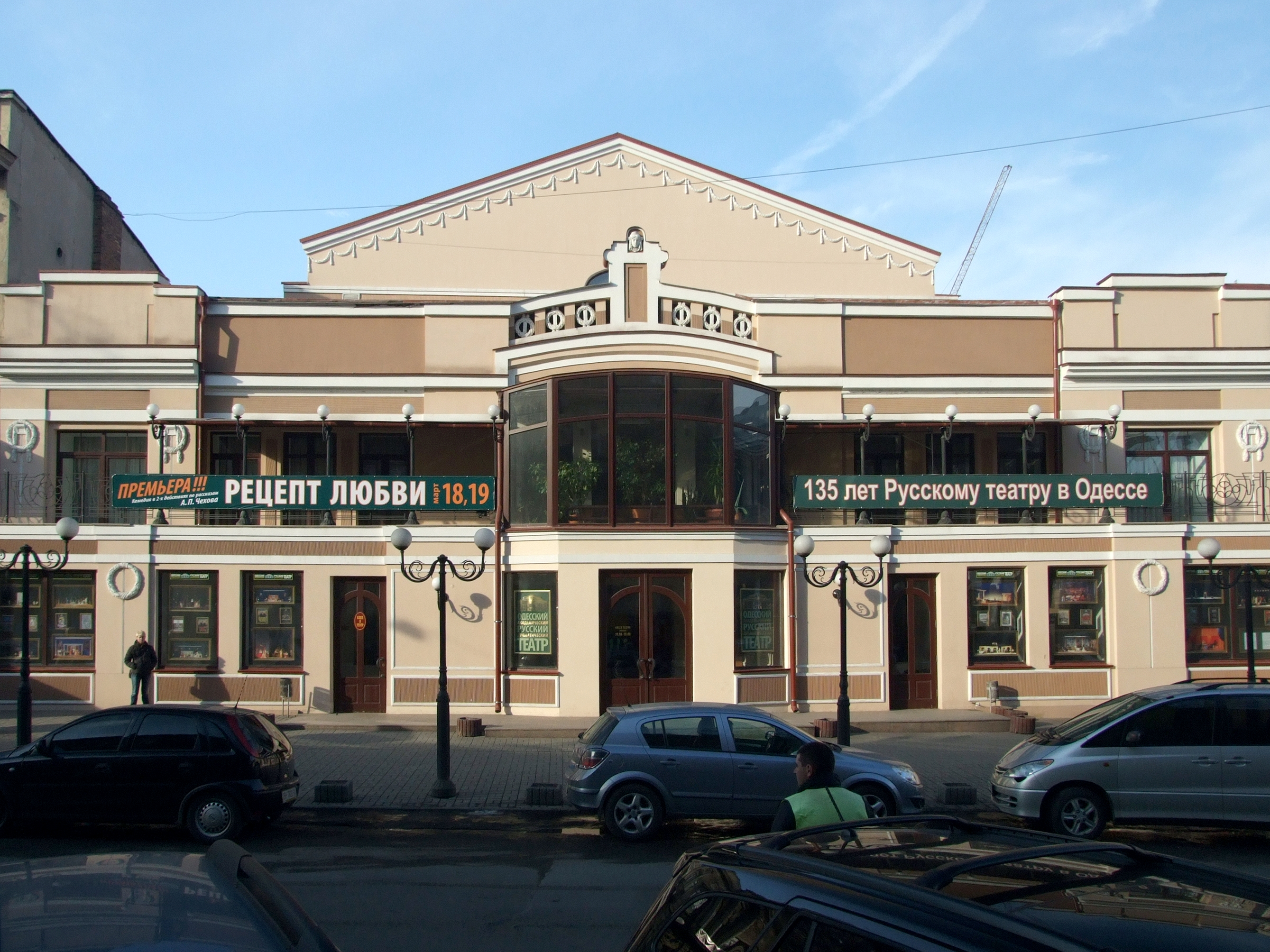
- The Theatre building on Hretska Street
- Interactive map of Odesa Oblast Academic Drama Theater

Immovable Monument of Local Significance of Ukraine
- Official name: Будівля Російського театру (Скетінг ринг) (арх. Троупянський Ф.А.), в якому: - 16 січня 1914 р. виступав Маяковський В.В. - російський поет; - працював Астангов М.Ф. - актор; - 21 серпня 1928 р. Булгаков М.А., російський письменник, читав п’єсу «Бег» - працював Високов В.Ф. - актор, н.а. УРСР (Building of the Russian Theater (Skating ring) (arch. F. Troupianskyi), in which: the Russian poet V. V. Mayakovsky performed on 16 January 1914; the actor M. F. Astanhov worked; the Russian writer M. A. Bulgakov performed his play The Flight; the actor and people's artist of Ukrainian SSR V. F. Vysokov worked)
- Type: Architecture, Urban Planning, History
- Reference no.: 202-Од

The Odesa Oblast Academic Drama Theater (Ukrainian: Одеський обласний академічний драматичний театр, romanized: Odeskyi oblasnyi akademichnyi dramatychnyi teatr) is the oldest theatre in southern Ukraine.

The theatre was constructed in 1874 at the initiative of A. C. Velikanov, a local merchant. Velikanov also intended to hire for Nikolai Miloslavsky’s company as the main performer for the theatre. Initially the theatre was called ‘’Theatre Velikanova’’ after his owner. However, in 1875 Velikanov sold the theatre to F. Rafalovich who renamed it “Russian Theatre”, name which it kept up to present.

In the years before the Russian Revolution the theatre hosted the main theatrical events of the city. Many Russian, Ukrainian, German, French, Italian, drama, opera and оperetta companies performed on its stage among which Sarah Bernhardt, Eleonora Duse, Benoît-Constant Coquelin, Jean Mounet-Sully, Maria Savina, Vladimir Davydov, Maria Zankovetskaya, Panas Saksagansky and Mark Kropivnitsky.

After the Russian Civil War, the “State Odessa Russian Drama Theatre” was officially registered in 1926 and the building was allocated to this government owned entity. In 1927, the Executive Political Committee of the Odessa Governorate (Gubispolkom) appointed opera singer Andrei Alekseyevich Ivanov as director of the theatre. Today the theatre is also called the Ivanov Theatre. Important actors started their activity at the Odessa Russian Theatre, among which Mikhail Astangov, Darya Zerkalova and Vladimir Samoilov. Among the actors which spent most of their acting activity on the theatre’s stage are Nikolai Komissarov, Nikolai Volkov the elder, Liya Bugova, Pavel Mikhaylov, Boris Zaydenberg, Leonid Marennikova, Yevgeny Kotov, Lidiya Polyakova and Igor Shelyugin. Important Russian and Ukrainian directors mounted productions at the Odessa Russian Theatre, among which: Abram Rubin, Alexey Gripich, Аvraam Teplev, Aleksandr Solomarsky, Vladimir Bortko the elder, Viktor Terentyev, Konstantin Chernyadev, Viktor Strizhov, Eduard Mitnitsky, Aleksandr Dzekun and many other things After the collapse of the Soviet Union, the theatre maintained its status as Russian-language theatre. Being closed for renovation for about two years, the theatre opened in 2003 after extensive reconstruction and major overhaul. A team of young actors has been hired, which interact with well-known visiting actors. An art management of theatre is coordinated by a board consisting of three directors. At present, these positions are held by Alexey Girba, Sergey Golomazov and Alexey Litvin.

In December 2009, the Ministry of Culture and Tourism of Ukraine awarded the Odesa Regional Russian Drama Theatre the rank of academic theatre. In the Soviet Union and the new states created after the collapse of the Soviet Union, this title is awarded to the theatres considered to be most prestigious in the country.

On March 2, 2022, in connection with the large-scale military 2022 Russian invasion of Ukraine, the theater team decided to rename the theater. The word "Russian" was removed from its name.
