= Pitelinsky District =

Pitelinsky District Пителинский район (Russian)
- District
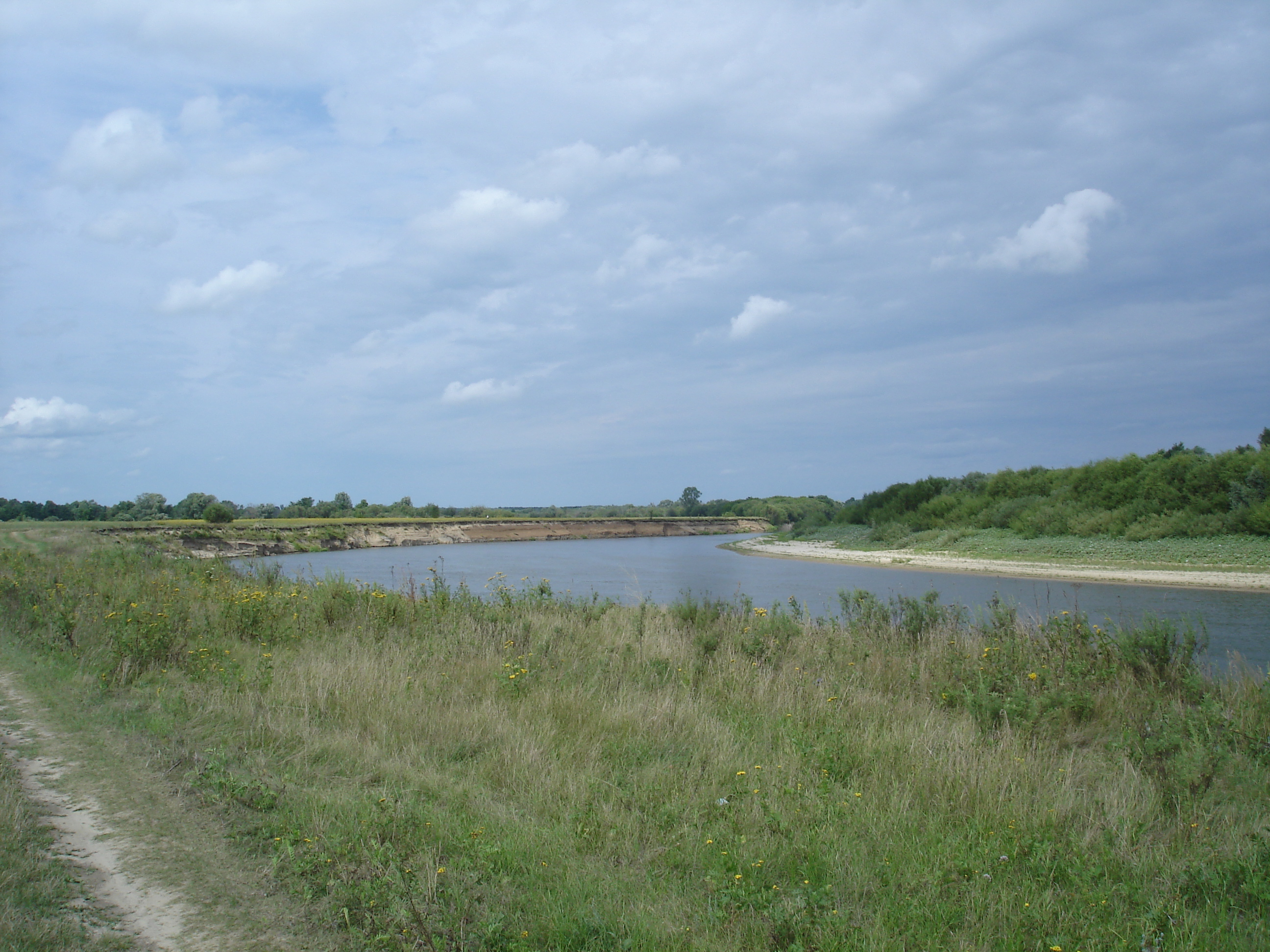
- The Moksha River near the selo of Savro-Mamyshevo in Pitelinsky District

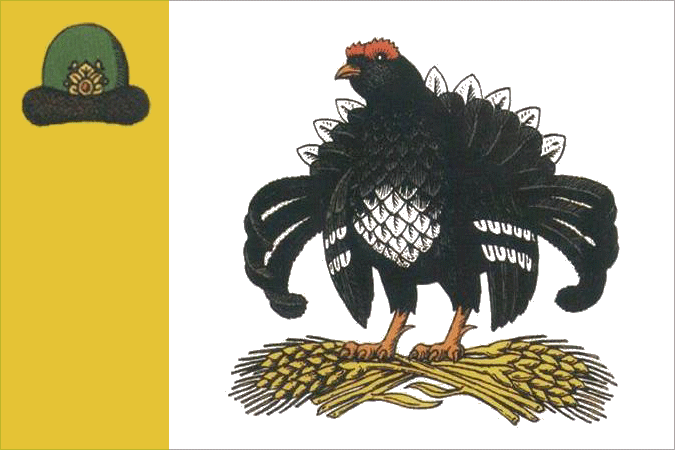
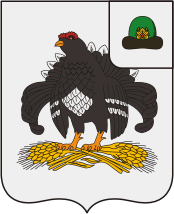
- Flag Coat of arms
- Location of Pitelinsky District in Ryazan Oblast
- Coordinates: 54°34′50″N 41°48′48″E
- Country: Russia
- Federal subject: Ryazan Oblast
- Established: 12 July 1929
- Administrative center: Pitelino

Area
  - Total: 953 km^{2} (368 sq mi)

Population (2010 Census)
  - Total: 5,893
  - Density: 6.18/km^{2} (16.0/sq mi)
  - Urban: 38.3%
  - Rural: 61.7%

Administrative structure
  - Administrative divisions: 1 Work settlements, 11 Rural okrugs
  - Inhabited localities: 1 urban-type settlements, 49 rural localities

Municipal structure
  - Municipally incorporated as: Pitelinsky Municipal District
  - Municipal divisions: 1 urban settlements, 4 rural settlements
- Time zone: UTC+3 (MSK)
- OKTMO ID: 61623000
- Website: http://pitelino.ru/

Pitelinsky District (Russian: Пите́линский райо́н) is an administrative and municipal district (raion), one of the twenty-five in Ryazan Oblast, Russia. It is located in the northeast of the oblast. The area of the district is 953 square kilometers (368 sq mi). Its administrative center is the urban locality (a work settlement) of Pitelino. Population: 5,893 (2010 Census); 7,250 (2002 census); 9,228 (1989 Soviet census). The population of Pitelino accounts for 38.3% of the district's total population.

== Notable residents ==
- Aleksei Mamykin (1936–2011), football player and coach, born in Veryaevo
