= Ukholovsky District =

Ukholovsky District Ухоловский район (Russian)
- District
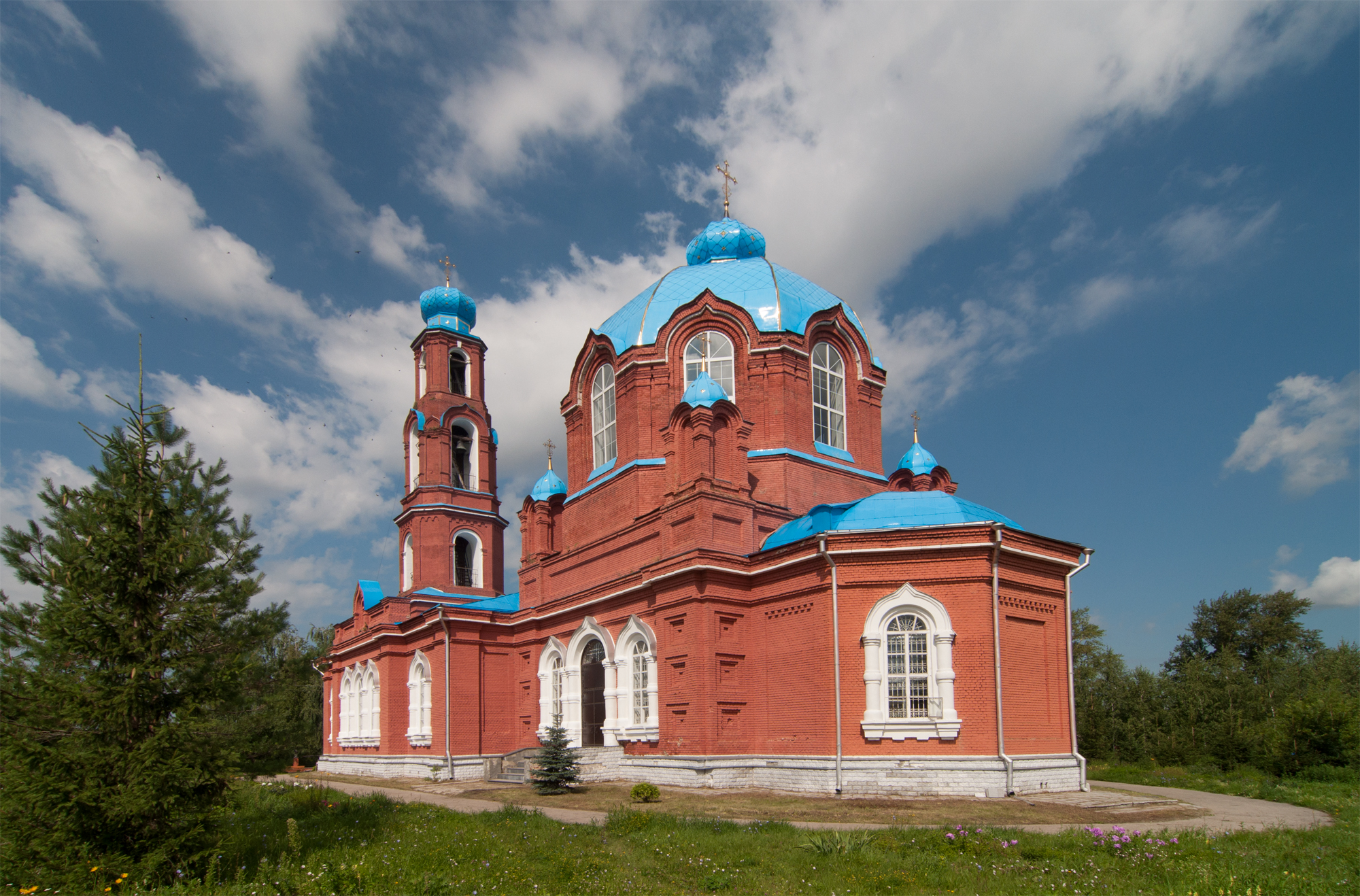
- Church of the Intercession, Yaserek, Ukholovsky District

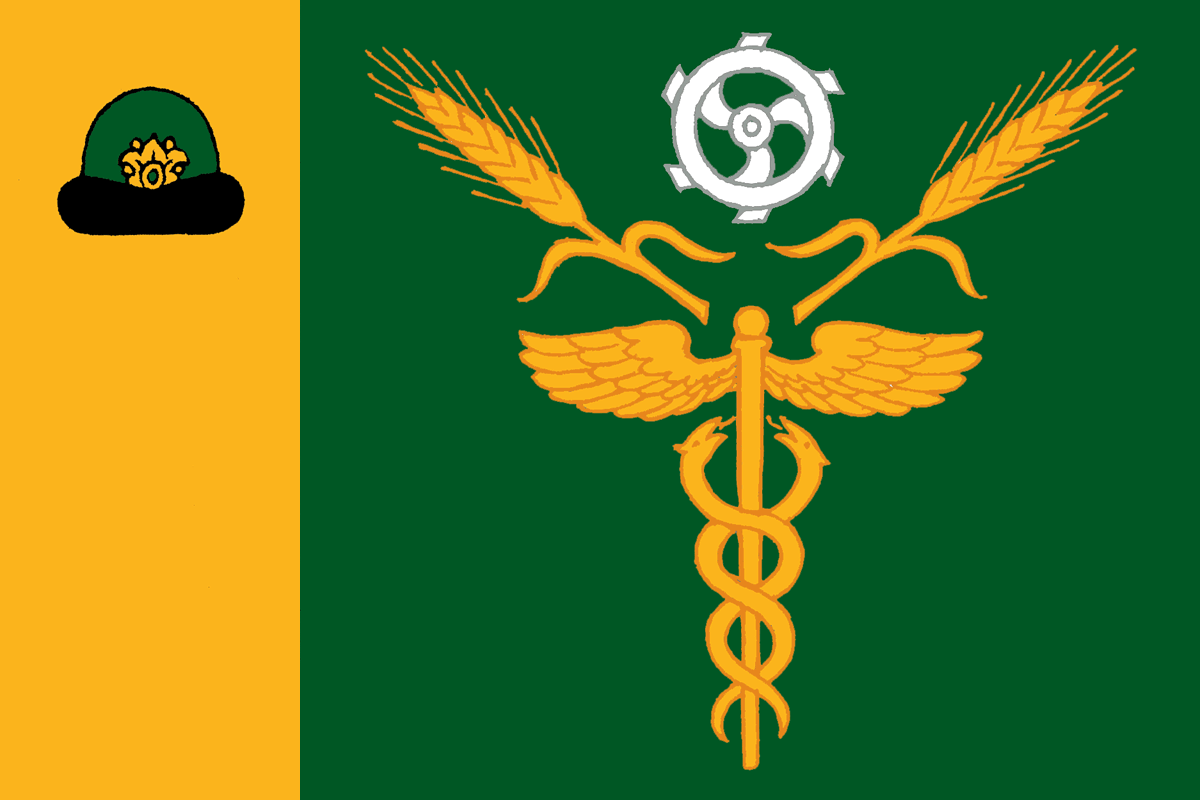
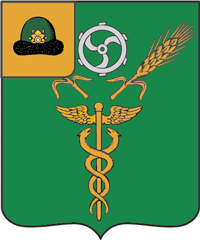
- Flag Coat of arms
- Location of Ukholovsky District in Ryazan Oblast
- Coordinates: 53°47′32″N 40°29′09″E
- Country: Russia
- Federal subject: Ryazan Oblast
- Administrative center: Ukholovo

Area
  - Total: 956 km^{2} (369 sq mi)

Population (2010 Census)
  - Total: 9,532
  - Density: 9.97/km^{2} (25.8/sq mi)
  - Urban: 52.1%
  - Rural: 47.9%

Administrative structure
  - Administrative divisions: 1 Work settlements, 12 Rural okrugs
  - Inhabited localities: 1 urban-type settlements, 52 rural localities

Municipal structure
  - Municipally incorporated as: Ukholovsky Municipal District
  - Municipal divisions: 1 urban settlements, 4 rural settlements
- Time zone: UTC+3 (MSK)
- OKTMO ID: 61650000
- Website: http://uholovo62.ru/

Ukholovsky District (Russian: У́холовский райо́н) is an administrative and municipal district (raion), one of the twenty-five in Ryazan Oblast, Russia. It is located in the south of the oblast. The area of the district is 956 square kilometers (369 sq mi). Its administrative center is the urban locality (a work settlement) of Ukholovo. Population: 9,532 (2010 Census); 11,725 (2002 census); 13,509 (1989 Soviet census). The population of Ukholovo accounts for 52.1% of the district's total population.
