= Yermishinsky District =

Yermishinsky District Ермишинский район (Russian)
- District
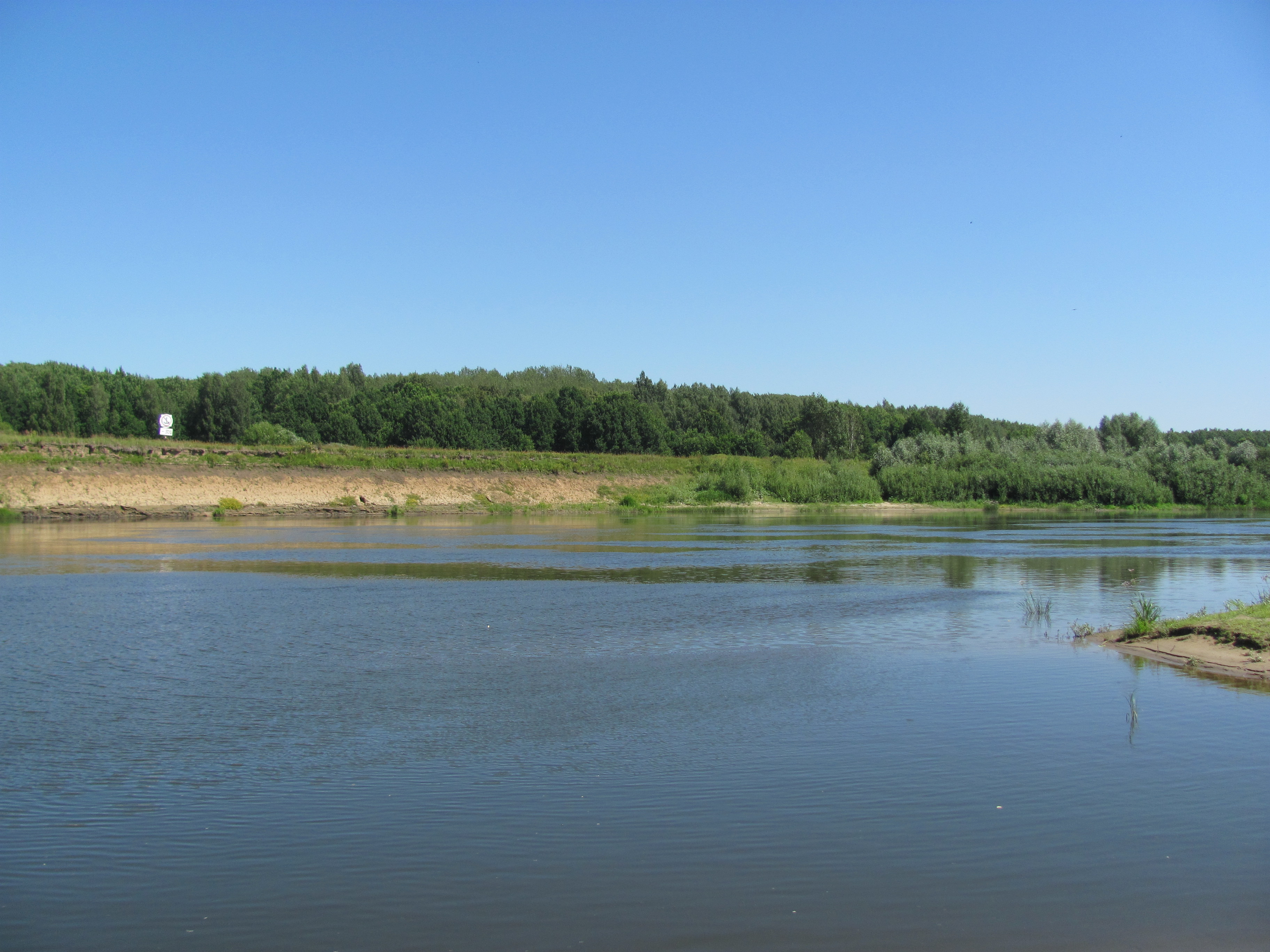
- The Moksha River in Yermishinsky District

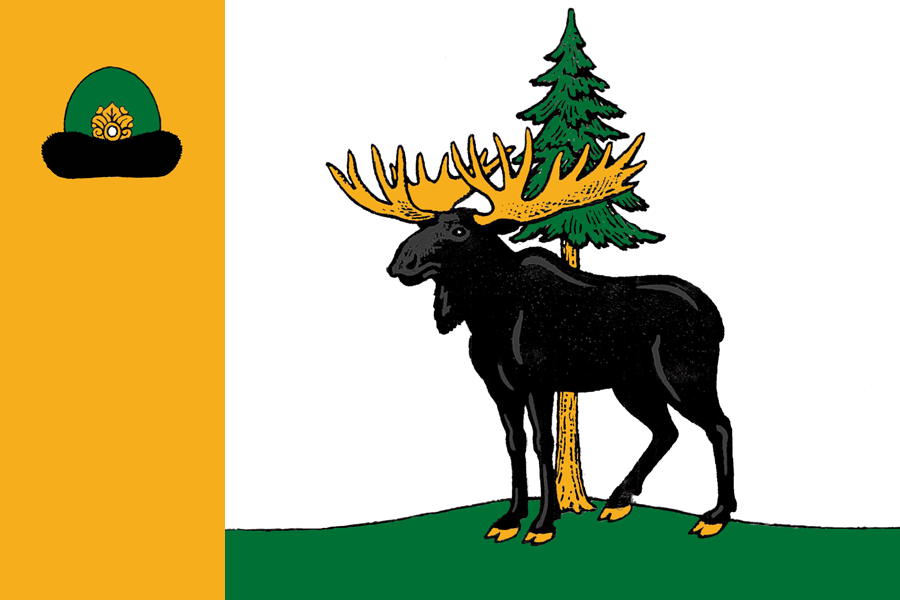
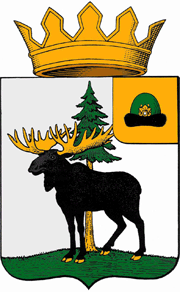
- Flag Coat of arms
- Location of Yermishinsky District in Ryazan Oblast
- Coordinates: 54°46′N 42°16′E
- Country: Russia
- Federal subject: Ryazan Oblast
- Administrative center: Yermish

Area
  - Total: 1,342 km^{2} (518 sq mi)

Population (2010 Census)
  - Total: 8,879
  - Density: 6.616/km^{2} (17.14/sq mi)
  - Urban: 48.9%
  - Rural: 51.1%

Administrative structure
  - Administrative divisions: 1 Work settlements, 11 Rural okrugs
  - Inhabited localities: 1 urban-type settlements, 60 rural localities

Municipal structure
  - Municipally incorporated as: Yermishinsky Municipal District
  - Municipal divisions: 1 urban settlements, 5 rural settlements
- Time zone: UTC+3 (MSK)
- OKTMO ID: 61602000
- Website: http://www.admstar.ru/

Yermishinsky District (Russian: Ермиши́нский райо́н) is an administrative and municipal district (raion), one of the twenty-five in Ryazan Oblast, Russia. It is located in the northeast of the oblast. The area of the district is 1,342 square kilometers (518 sq mi). Its administrative center is the urban locality (a work settlement) of Yermish. Population: 8,879 (2010 Census); 10,926 (2002 census); 13,288 (1989 Soviet census). The population of Yermish accounts for 48.9% of the district's total population.

== Notable residents ==
- Ivan Vlasov (1903–1969), politician, nominal head of state of the RSFSR under Stalin, born in Nikolayevka
