= Tsentralny, Ivanovo Oblast =

Tsentralny Центральный
- Village
- Location within Ivanovo Oblast Location within Russia
- Coordinates: 56°44′N 41°22′E
- Country: Russia
- Region: Ivanovo Oblast
- District: Shuysky District
- Time zone: UTC+3:00

Tsentralny (Russian: Центральный) is a rural locality (a selo) in Shuysky District, Ivanovo Oblast, Russia. Population: 515 (2010 census);

== Geography ==
This rural locality is located 12 kilometres (7.5 mi) from Shuya (the district's administrative centre), 37 kilometres (23 mi) from Ivanovo (capital of Ivanovo Oblast) and 254 kilometres (158 mi) from Moscow. Vekino is the nearest rural locality.
