= Kasimovsky District =

Kasimovsky District Касимовский район (Russian)
- District
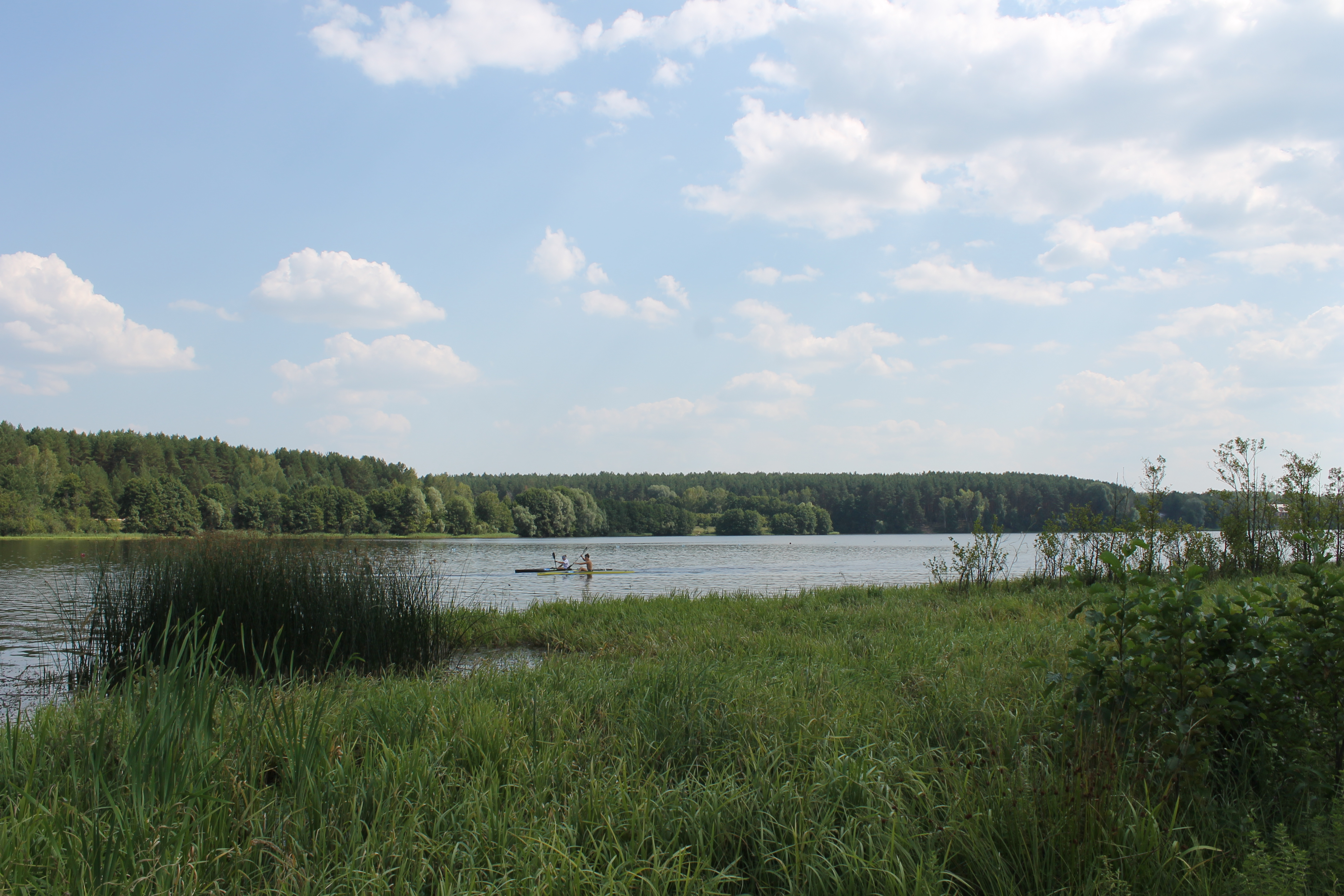
- Lake Syntul, Kasimovsky District

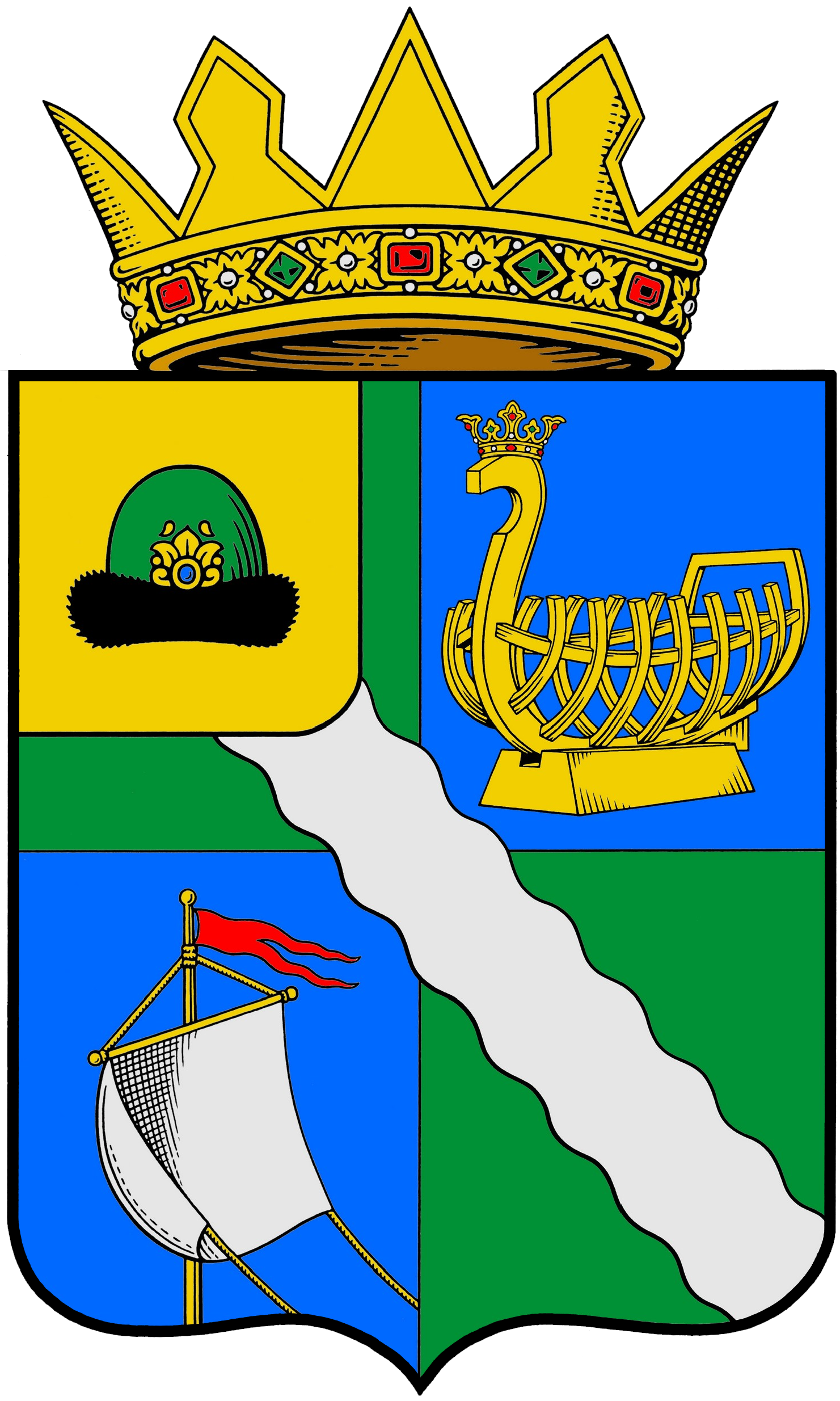
- Flag Coat of arms
- Location of Kasimovsky District in Ryazan Oblast
- Coordinates: 54°56′N 41°24′E
- Country: Russia
- Federal subject: Ryazan Oblast
- Established: 1935
- Administrative center: Kasimov

Area
  - Total: 2,969 km^{2} (1,146 sq mi)

Population (2010 Census)
  - Total: 29,602
  - Density: 9.970/km^{2} (25.82/sq mi)
  - Urban: 30.2%
  - Rural: 69.8%

Administrative structure
  - Administrative divisions: 3 Work settlements, 28 Rural okrugs
  - Inhabited localities: 3 urban-type settlements, 205 rural localities

Municipal structure
  - Municipally incorporated as: Kasimovsky Municipal District
  - Municipal divisions: 3 urban settlements, 22 rural settlements
- Time zone: UTC+3 (MSK)
- OKTMO ID: 61608000
- Website: https://kasimov.ryazangov.ru

Kasimovsky District (Russian: Каси́мовский райо́н) is an administrative and municipal district (raion), one of the twenty-five in Ryazan Oblast, Russia. It is located in the north of the oblast. The area of the district is 2,969 square kilometers (1,146 sq mi). Its administrative center is the town of Kasimov (which is not administratively a part of the district). Population: 29,602 (2010 Census); 35,365 (2002 census); 41,422 (1989 Soviet census).

== Administrative and municipal status ==
Within the framework of administrative divisions, Kasimovsky District is one of the twenty-five in the oblast. The town of Kasimov serves as its administrative center, despite being incorporated separately as a town of oblast significance—an administrative unit with the status equal to that of the districts.

As a municipal division, the district is incorporated as Kasimovsky Municipal District. The town of oblast significance of Kasimov is incorporated separately from the district as Kasimov Urban Okrug.
