= Yermish =

Yermish Ермишь
- Urban-type settlement
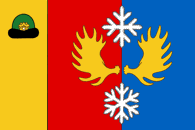
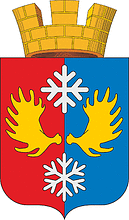
- Flag Coat of arms
- Interactive map of Yermish
- Location of Yermish Yermish (Ryazan Oblast)
- Coordinates: 54.7681°N 42.2756°E
- Country: Russia
- Federal subject: Ryazan Oblast
- Administrative district: Yermishinsky District
- Founded: 1628

Population (2010 Census)
  - Total: 4,345
  - Estimate (2023): 3,342 (−23.1%)
- Time zone: UTC+3 (MSK)
- Postal code: 391660
- OKTMO ID: 61602151051

Yermish (Russian: Е́рмишь) is an urban locality (an urban-type settlement) in Yermishinsky District of Ryazan Oblast, Russia. Population: 4,345 (2010 census); 4,715 (2002 census); 5,061 (1989 Soviet census).
