= Tsentralny, Voronezh Oblast =

Tsentralny Центральный
- Settlement
- Location within Voronezh Oblast Location within Russia
- Coordinates: 51°05′N 40°58′E
- Country: Russia
- Region: Voronezh Oblast
- District: Talovsky District
- Time zone: UTC+3:00

Tsentralny (Russian: Центральный) is a rural locality (a settlement) in Dobrinskoye Rural Settlement, Talovsky District, Voronezh Oblast, Russia. The population was 174 as of 2010. There are 4 streets.
