= Tsentralnyi District =

Tsentralnyi District (Ukrainian: Центральний район) may refer to the following places in Ukraine:

- Tsentralnyi District, Dnipro, an urban district of Dnipro
- Tsentralnyi District, Kherson, an urban district of Kherson
- Tsentralnyi District, Mariupol, an urban district of Mariupol
- Tsentralnyi District, Mykolaiv, an urban district of Mykolaiv
- Tsentralnyi District, Simferopol, an urban district of Simferopol
