= Sarai, Ryazan Oblast =

Sarai Сараи
- Urban-type settlement
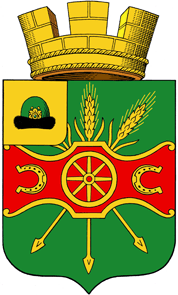
- Coat of arms
- Interactive map of Sarai
- Location of Sarai Sarai (Ryazan Oblast)
- Coordinates: 53.7217°N 40.9975°E
- Country: Russia
- Federal subject: Ryazan Oblast
- Administrative district: Sarayevsky District

Population (2010 Census)
  - Total: 5,802
  - Estimate (2023): 4,902 (−15.5%)
- Time zone: UTC+3 (MSK)
- Postal code: 391870
- OKTMO ID: 61640151051

Sarai (Russian: Сараи) is an urban locality (an urban-type settlement) in Sarayevsky District of Ryazan Oblast, Russia. Population: 5,802 (2010 census); 6,604 (2002 census); 7,996 (1989 Soviet census).
