= Tsentralnoye, Belgorod Oblast =

Tsentralnoye Центральное
- Selo
- Location within Belgorod Oblast Location within Russia
- Coordinates: 50°51′N 35°54′E
- Country: Russia
- Region: Belgorod Oblast
- District: Rakityansky District
- Time zone: UTC+3:00

Tsentralnoye (Russian: Центральное) is a rural locality (a selo) and the administrative center of Tsentralnoye Rural Settlement, Rakityansky District, Belgorod Oblast, Russia. The population was 678 as of 2010. There are 9 streets.

== Geography ==
Tsentralnoye is located 7 km northeast of Rakitnoye (the district's administrative centre) by road. Novozinaidinskoye is the nearest rural locality.
