= Spassk-Ryazansky =

Town in Ryazan Oblast, Russia

Spassk-Ryazansky Спасск-Рязанский
- Town
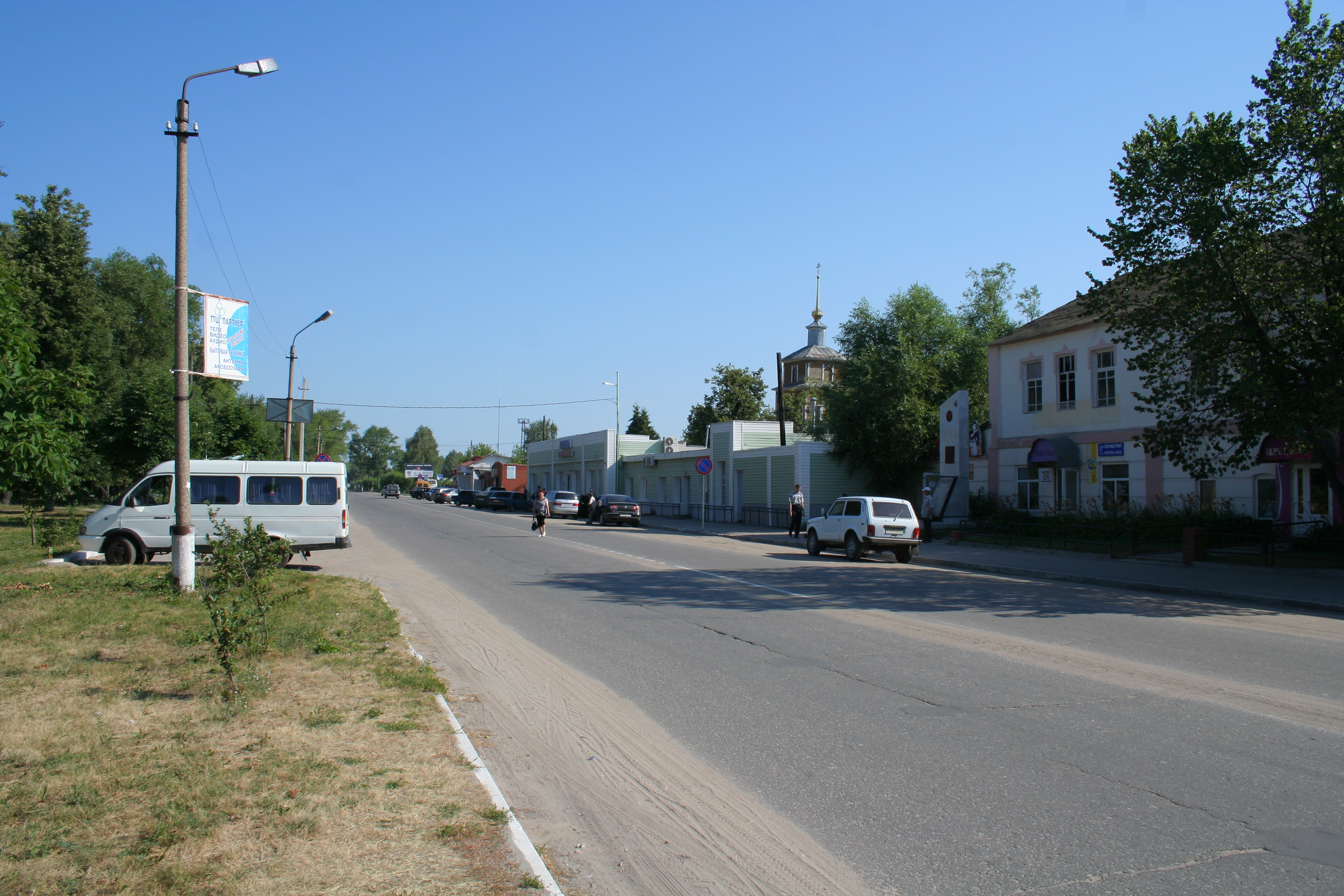
- Spassk-Ryazansky town center

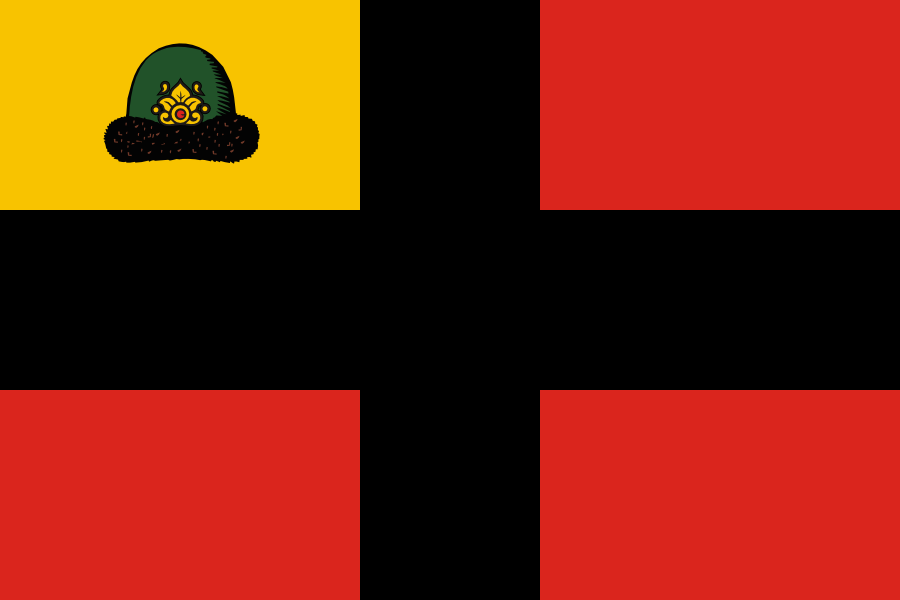
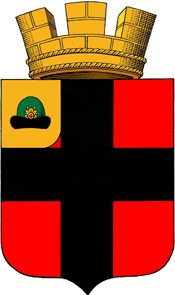
- Flag Coat of arms
- Interactive map of Spassk-Ryazansky
- Location of Spassk-Ryazansky Spassk-Ryazansky (Ryazan Oblast)
- Coordinates: 54°24′N 40°23′E
- Country: Russia
- Federal subject: Ryazan Oblast
- Administrative district: Spassky District
- Town of district significanceSelsoviet: Spassk-Ryazansky
- Founded: 1629
- Town status since: 1778
- Elevation: 100 m (330 ft)

Population (2010 Census)
  - Total: 7,745
  - Estimate (2023): 5,705 (−26.3%)

Administrative status
  - Capital of: Spassky District, town of district significance of Spassk-Ryazansky

Municipal status
  - Municipal district: Spassky Municipal District
  - Urban settlement: Spassk-Ryazanskoye Urban Settlement
  - Capital of: Spassky Municipal District, Spassk-Ryazanskoye Urban Settlement
- Time zone: UTC+3 (MSK)
- Postal codes: 391050, 391099
- OKTMO ID: 61646101001

Spassk-Ryazansky (Russian: Спасск-Ряза́нский) is a town and the administrative center of Spassky District in Ryazan Oblast, Russia, located on the shores of Lake Spasskoye, 55 kilometers (34 mi) southeast of Ryazan, the administrative center of the oblast. Population: 7,745 (2010 census); 8,858 (2002 census); 9,835 (1989 Soviet census).

== History ==
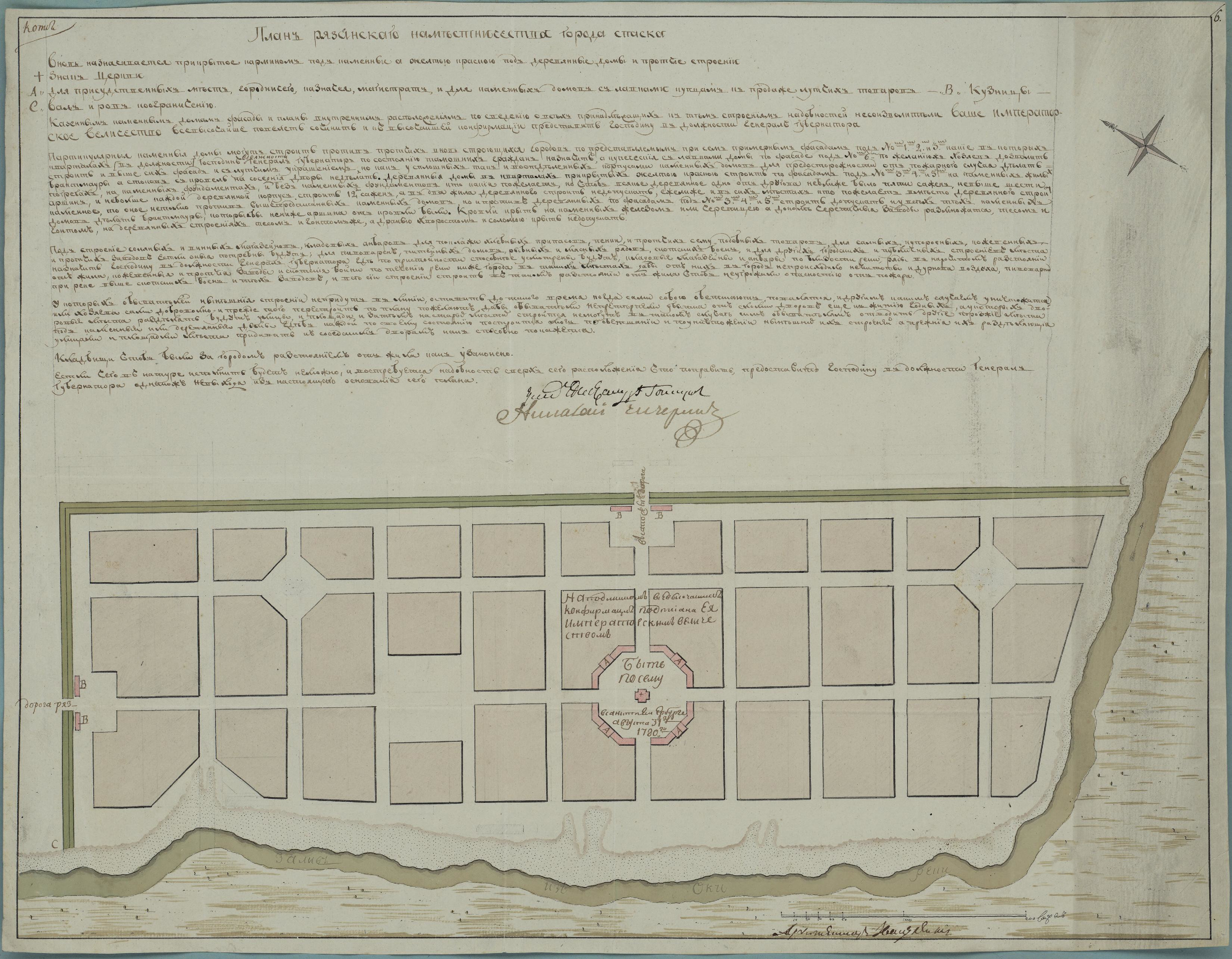
Plan of Spassk (Spassk-Ryazansky), 1780

It was founded in 1629 as the sloboda of Vaskina Polyana (Васькина Поляна). In 1778, it was renamed Spassk (Спасск) and granted town status. In 1929, the town was given its present name.

When the Nazi Germany invaded Soviet Union, the Eastern Front has been started, the Military-Political School of the Western Front was stationed in Spassk-Ryazansky from October 27, 1941 to September 22, 1942.

== Administrative and municipal status ==
Within the framework of administrative divisions, Spassk-Ryazansky serves as the administrative center of Spassky District. As an administrative division, it is incorporated within Spassky District as the town of district significance of Spassk-Ryazansky. As a municipal division, the town of district significance of Spassk-Ryazansky is incorporated within Spassky Municipal District as Spassk-Ryazanskoye Urban Settlement.
