= Tuma, Ryazan Oblast =

Tuma Тума
- Urban-type settlement
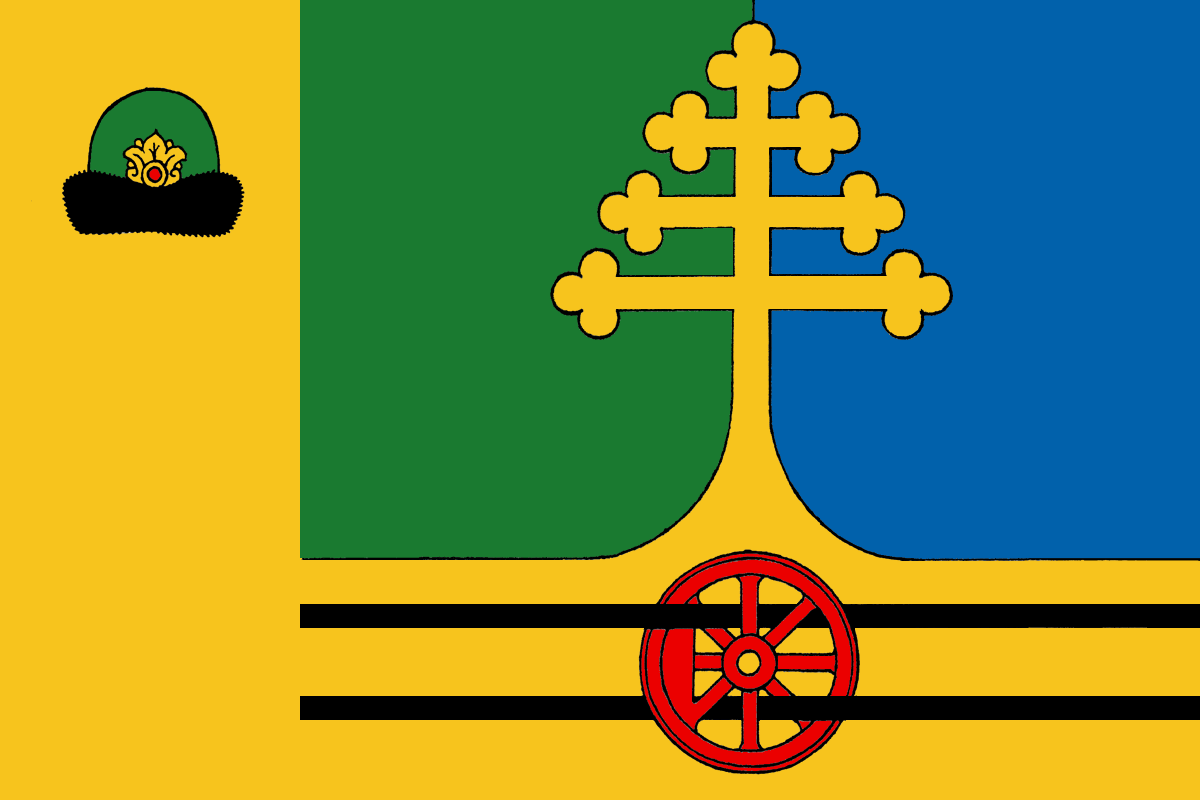
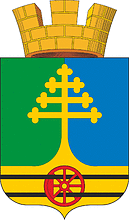
- Flag Coat of arms
- Interactive map of Tuma
- Location of Tuma Tuma (Ryazan Oblast)
- Coordinates: 55.1462°N 40.5514°E
- Country: Russia
- Federal subject: Ryazan Oblast
- Administrative district: Klepikovsky District

Population (2010 Census)
  - Total: 6,163
  - Estimate (2023): 5,350 (−13.2%)
- Time zone: UTC+3 (MSK)
- Postal code: 391001
- OKTMO ID: 61610154051

Tuma (Russian: Ту́ма) is an urban locality (an urban-type settlement) in Klepikovsky District of Ryazan Oblast, Russia. Population: 6,163 (2010 census); 6,596 (2002 census); 7,082 (1989 Soviet census).
