= Nikolay Miloslavsky =

Russian actor (1811–1882)

Nikolai Pavlovich Miloslavsky (c. 1811–1882) was a Russian male actor.

== Career ==
He first joined the army serving in the cavalry. However, he soon abandoned his military career and in 1839 appeared on stage in Saint Petersburg in the vaudeville Thirty years or the life of a gambler, which he had translated from French, without drawing attention. He then played in Moscow, Odesa, Nizhny Novgorod and other cities.

In 1850 in Kaluga, Miloslavsky directed Aleksandr Griboyedov's play Woe from Wit, which was blacklisted in many Russian provincial cities.

He returned to Saint Petersburg in 1859 where, this time, his performance was a great success. However, he was not able to secure a place in the Alexandrinsky Theatre or the Maly Theatre, Saint Petersburg's main theatres, which, at the time, were dominated by Vasily Samoilov.

In 1870 Miloslavsky moved to Odesa, where he created his own theatre company and from 1874 his company was mainly playing at the Odessa Russian Theatre.

== Death ==
Miloslavsky died in Odesa in 1882.

== Theatre roles ==
Among the plays in which he acted were:

- Aleksandr Palm's The Old Landowner as Opolyev,
- Aleksandr Sukhovo-Kobylin's play Krechinsky's Wedding as Krechinsky in
- Trente ans, ou la Vie d’un joueur by Victor Ducange, Jacques-Félix Beudin and Prosper Goubaux as Georges de Germany
- Nikolai Polevoy's "Ugolino" as Nino
- Shakespeare's King Lear in the title role,
- Shakespeare's Hamlet in the title role
- Shakespeare's The Merchant of Venice as Shylock
- Edward Bulwer-Lytton's Richelieu as Cardinal Richelieu
- Friedrich Schiller's "Intrigue and Love" as Ferdinand
- Aleksey Konstantinovich Tolstoy's "The Death of Ivan the Terrible" » as Ivan the Terrible
- Aleksandr Ostrovsky's "The Poor Bride" as Vladimir Vasilyevich Merich
- Aleksandr Ostrovsky's "Enough Stupidity in Every Wise Man" as Ivan Ivanovich Gorodulin
- Aleksandr Ostrovsky's "A Profitable place" as Aristarkh Vladimirych Vyshnevsky
