= Pitelino =

Pitelino Пителино
- Urban-type settlement
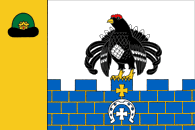
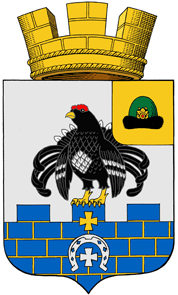
- Flag Coat of arms
- Interactive map of Pitelino
- Location of Pitelino Pitelino (Ryazan Oblast)
- Coordinates: 54.5757°N 41.8150°E
- Country: Russia
- Federal subject: Ryazan Oblast
- Administrative district: Pitelinsky District

Population (2010 Census)
  - Total: 2,257
  - Estimate (2023): 1,907 (−15.5%)
- Time zone: UTC+3 (MSK)
- Postal code: 391630
- OKTMO ID: 61623151051

Pitelino (Russian: Пите́лино) is an urban locality (an urban-type settlement) in Pitelinsky District of Ryazan Oblast, Russia. Population: 2,257 (2010 census); 2,415 (2002 census); 2,742 (1989 Soviet census).
