= Ryazhsky District =

Ryazhsky District Ряжский район (Russian)
- District
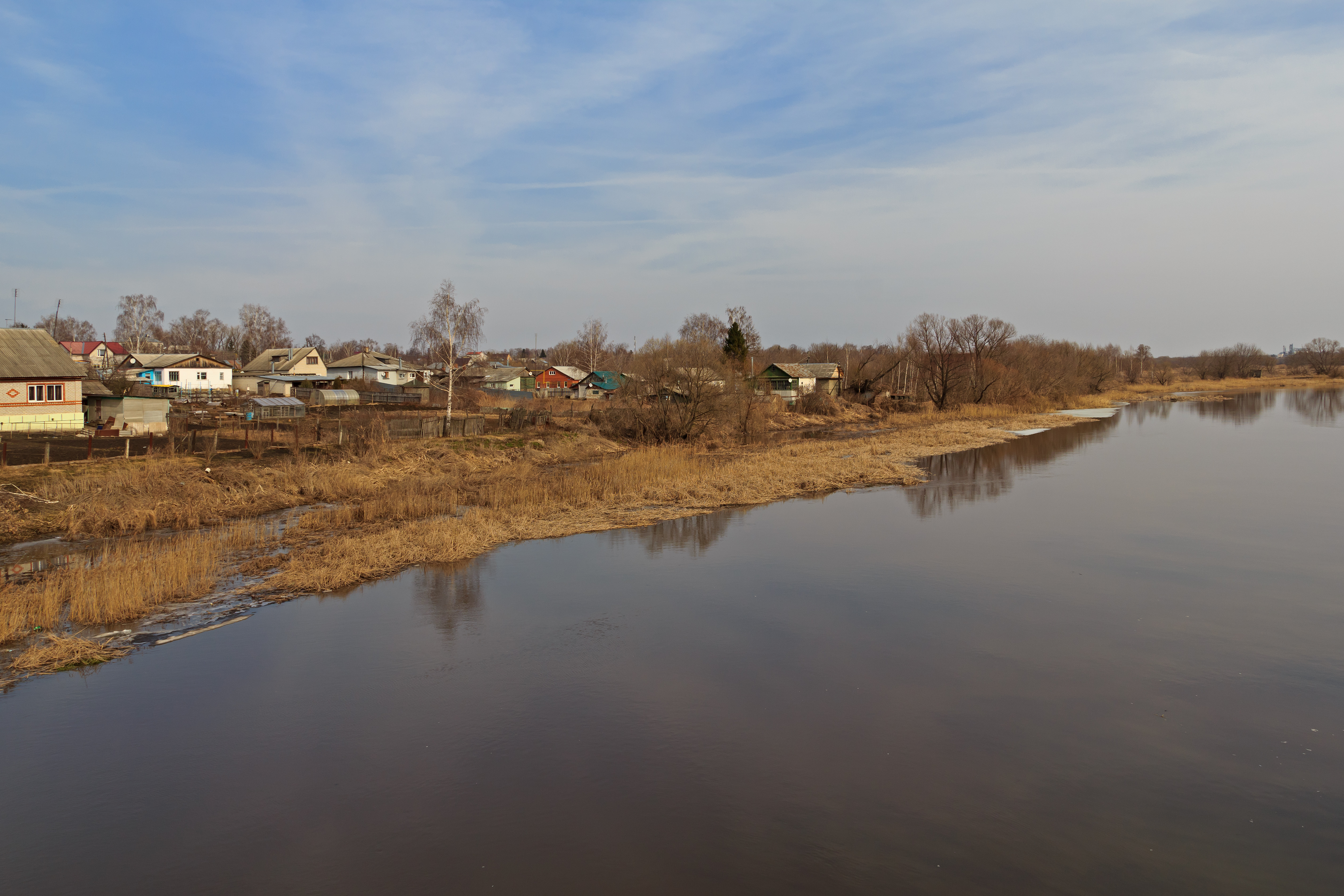
- Khupta River, Ryazhsky District

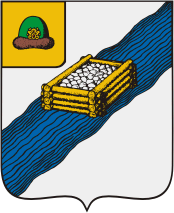
- Flag Coat of arms
- Location of Ryazhsky District in Ryazan Oblast
- Coordinates: 53°42′N 40°04′E
- Country: Russia
- Federal subject: Ryazan Oblast
- Established: 12 July 1929
- Administrative center: Ryazhsk

Area
  - Total: 1,019 km^{2} (393 sq mi)

Population (2010 Census)
  - Total: 29,026
  - Density: 28.48/km^{2} (73.78/sq mi)
  - Urban: 74.7%
  - Rural: 25.3%

Administrative structure
  - Administrative divisions: 1 Towns of district significance, 16 Rural okrugs
  - Inhabited localities: 1 cities/towns, 60 rural localities

Municipal structure
  - Municipally incorporated as: Ryazhsky Municipal District
  - Municipal divisions: 1 urban settlements, 5 rural settlements
- Time zone: UTC+3 (MSK)
- OKTMO ID: 61630000
- Website: http://www.ryajsk.ru/

Ryazhsky District (Russian: Ря́жский райо́н) is an administrative and municipal district (raion), one of the twenty-five in Ryazan Oblast, Russia. It is located in the south of the oblast. The area of the district is 1,019 square kilometers (393 sq mi). Its administrative center is the town of Ryazhsk. Population: 29,026 (2010 Census); 31,097 (2002 census); 37,322 (1989 Soviet census). The population of Ryazhsk accounts for 74.7% of the district's total population.

== Notable residents ==
- Boris Novikov (1925–1997), Soviet stage and film actor, People's Artist of Russia, born in Ryazhsk
