= Oktyabrsky, Ryazan Oblast =

Oktyabrsky Октябрьский
- Urban-type settlement
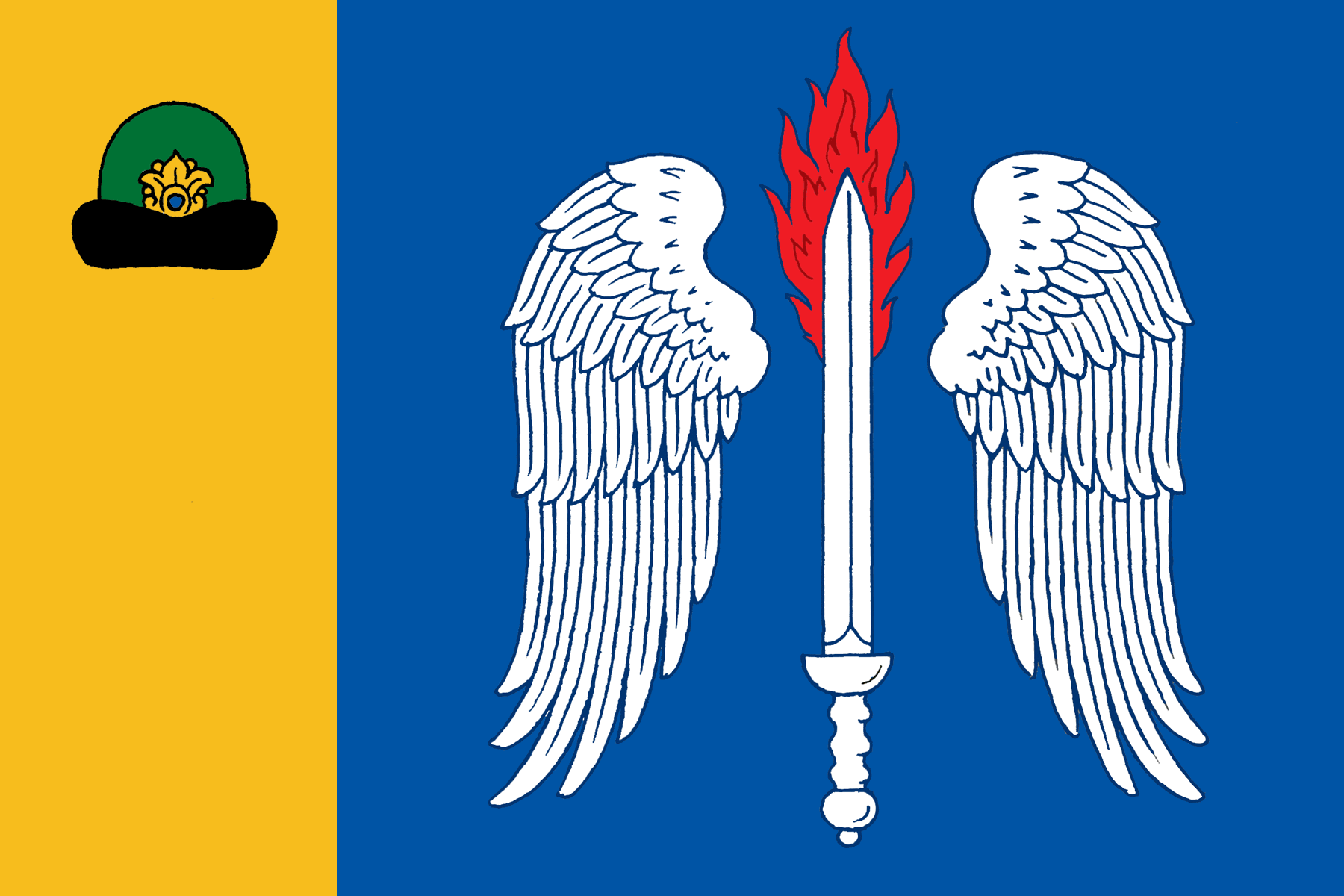
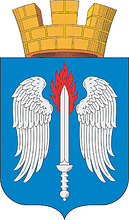
- Flag Coat of arms
- Interactive map of Oktyabrsky
- Location of Oktyabrsky Oktyabrsky (Ryazan Oblast)
- Coordinates: 54.2250°N 38.8976°E
- Country: Russia
- Federal subject: Ryazan Oblast
- Administrative district: Mikhaylovsky District
- Founded: 1927
- Elevation: 147 m (482 ft)

Population (2010 Census)
  - Total: 6,067
  - Estimate (2023): 5,870 (−3.2%)
- Time zone: UTC+3 (MSK)
- Postal codes: 391721, 391720
- OKTMO ID: 61617154051

Oktyabrsky (Russian: Октя́брьский) is an urban locality (an urban-type settlement) in Mikhaylovsky District of Ryazan Oblast, Russia. Population: 6,067 (2010 census); 6,718 (2002 census); 8,526 (1989 Soviet census).
