= Ukholovo =

Ukholovo Ухолово
- Urban-type settlement
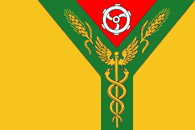
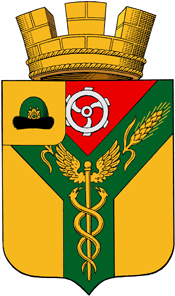
- Flag Coat of arms
- Interactive map of Ukholovo
- Location of Ukholovo Ukholovo (Ryazan Oblast)
- Coordinates: 53.7912°N 40.4885°E
- Country: Russia
- Federal subject: Ryazan Oblast
- Administrative district: Ukholovsky District

Population (2010 Census)
  - Total: 4,965
  - Estimate (2023): 3,859 (−22.3%)
- Time zone: UTC+3 (MSK)
- Postal code: 391920
- OKTMO ID: 61650151051

Ukholovo (Russian: Ухолово) is an urban locality (an urban-type settlement) in Ukholovsky District of Ryazan Oblast, Russia. Population: 4,965 (2010 census); 5,700 (2002 census); 6,223 (1989 Soviet census).
