= Tsentralny, Vladimir Oblast =

Tsentralny Центральный
- Settlement
- Location within Vladimir Oblast Location within Russia
- Coordinates: 56°12′N 42°07′E
- Country: Russia
- Region: Vladimir Oblast
- District: Vyaznikovsky District
- Time zone: UTC+3:00

Tsentralny (Russian: Центральный) is a rural locality (a settlement) in Paustovskoye Rural Settlement, Vyaznikovsky District, Vladimir Oblast, Russia. The population was 1,085 as of 2010. There are 7 streets.

== Geography ==
Tsentralny is located 10 km south of Vyazniki (the district's administrative centre) by road. Sergeyevo is the nearest rural locality.
