= Pobedinka =

Pobedinka Побединка
- Urban-type settlement
- Interactive map of Pobedinka
- Location of Pobedinka Pobedinka (Ryazan Oblast)
- Coordinates: 53.7135°N 39.5620°E
- Country: Russia
- Federal subject: Ryazan Oblast
- Administrative district: Skopinsky District

Population (2010 Census)
  - Total: 1,456
  - Estimate (2023): 1,536 (+5.5%)
- Time zone: UTC+3 (MSK)
- Postal code: 391844
- OKTMO ID: 61644157051

Pobedinka (Russian: Побединка) is an urban locality (an urban-type settlement) in Skopinsky District of Ryazan Oblast, Russia. Population: 1,456 (2010 census);
