= Miloslavskoye, Ryazan Oblast =

Miloslavskoye Милославское
- Urban-type settlement
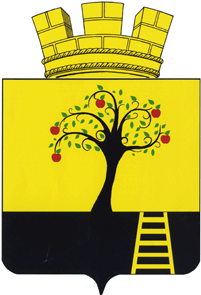
- Coat of arms
- Interactive map of Miloslavskoye
- Location of Miloslavskoye Miloslavskoye (Ryazan Oblast)
- Coordinates: 53.5804°N 39.4446°E
- Country: Russia
- Federal subject: Ryazan Oblast
- Administrative district: Miloslavsky District

Population (2010 Census)
  - Total: 4,478
  - Estimate (2023): 4,180 (−6.7%)
- Time zone: UTC+3 (MSK)
- Postal code: 391770
- OKTMO ID: 61615151051

Miloslavskoye (Russian: Милосла́вское) is an urban locality (an urban-type settlement) in Miloslavsky District of Ryazan Oblast, Russia. Population: 4,478 (2010 census); 4,813 (2002 census); 4,995 (1989 Soviet census).
