= Ryazhsk =

Town in Ryazan Oblast, Russia

Ryazhsk Ряжск
- Town

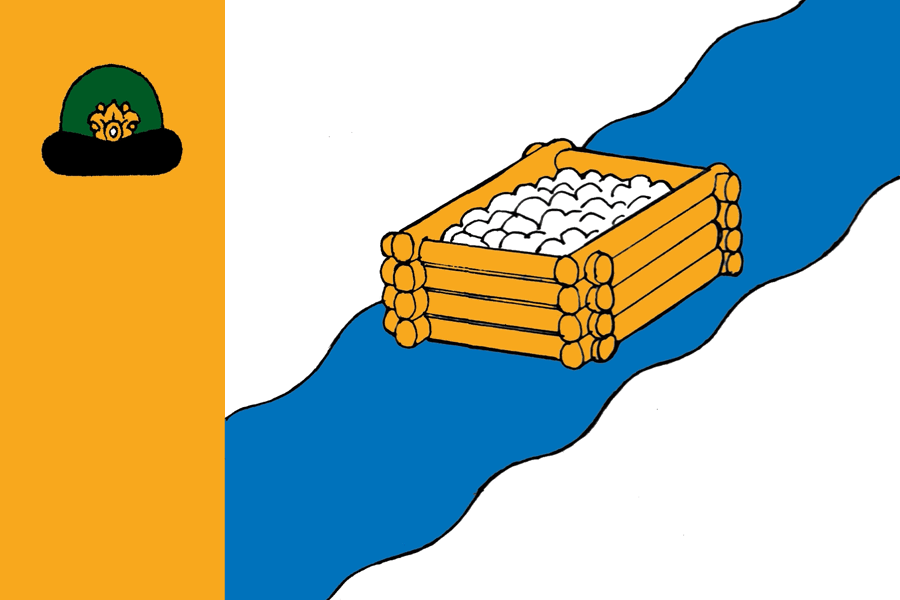
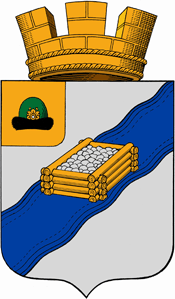
- Flag Coat of arms
- Interactive map of Ryazhsk
- Location of Ryazhsk Ryazhsk (Ryazan Oblast)
- Coordinates: 53°42′N 40°03′E
- Country: Russia
- Federal subject: Ryazan Oblast
- Administrative district: Ryazhsky District
- Town of district significanceSelsoviet: Ryazhsk
- Known since: 1502
- Elevation: 125 m (410 ft)

Population (2010 Census)
  - Total: 21,674
  - Estimate (2025): 19,886 (−8.2%)

Administrative status
  - Capital of: Ryazhsky District, town of district significance of Ryazhsk

Municipal status
  - Municipal district: Ryazhsky Municipal District
  - Urban settlement: Ryazhskoye Urban Settlement
  - Capital of: Ryazhsky Municipal District, Ryazhskoye Urban Settlement
- Time zone: UTC+3 (MSK)
- Postal codes: 391960, 391962–391964, 391999
- OKTMO ID: 61630101001

Ryazhsk (Russian: Ряжск) is a town and the administrative center of Ryazhsky District in Ryazan Oblast, Russia, located 115 kilometers (71 mi) south of Ryazan, the administrative center of the oblast. Population: 21,674 (2010 census); 22,850 (2002 census); 27,217; (1989 Soviet census) 26,000 (1974).

== History ==
It has been known to exist since 1502. In the late 16th century, it was a part of the Great Abatis Border and guarded the Ryazhsk portage from the Don to the Oka River.

== Administrative and municipal status ==
Within the framework of administrative divisions, Ryazhsk serves as the administrative center of Ryazhsky District. As an administrative division, it is incorporated within Ryazhsky District as the town of district significance of Ryazhsk. As a municipal division, the town of district significance of Ryazhsk is incorporated within Ryazhsky Municipal District as Ryazhskoye Urban Settlement.
