= Tsentralny, Ryazan Oblast =

Tsentralny Центральный
- Urban-type settlement
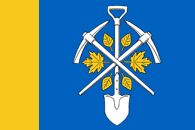
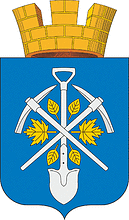
- Flag Coat of arms
- Interactive map of Tsentralny
- Location of Tsentralny Tsentralny (Ryazan Oblast)
- Coordinates: 53.6768°N 39.6296°E
- Country: Russia
- Federal subject: Ryazan Oblast
- Administrative district: Miloslavsky District

Population (2010 Census)
  - Total: 2,159
  - Estimate (2023): 1,121 (−48.1%)
- Time zone: UTC+3 (MSK)
- Postal code: 391793
- OKTMO ID: 61615160051

Tsentralny (Russian: Центральный) is an urban locality (an urban-type settlement) in Miloslavsky District of Ryazan Oblast, Russia. Population: 2,159 (2010 census); 1,960 (2002 census); 2,588 (1989 Soviet census).
