= Tsentralny okrug =

Tsentralny okrug may refer to:

- Central Federal District (Tsentralny federalny okrug), a federal district (okrug) of Russia
- Central Administrative Okrug (Tsentralny administrativny okrug), an administrative okrug of Moscow, Russia
- Tsentralny Administrative okrug, Omsk, a division of the city of Omsk, Russia
- Tsentralny Administrative okrug, Tyumen, a division of the city of Tyumen, Russia
- Tsentralny okrug, Krasnodar, a division of the city of Krasnodar, Russia
- Tsentralny okrug, Kursk, a division of the city of Kursk, Russia
- Tsentralny okrug, Nazran, a division of the city of Nazran, Russia
