= Sarayevsky District =

Sarayevsky District Сараевский район (Russian)
- District
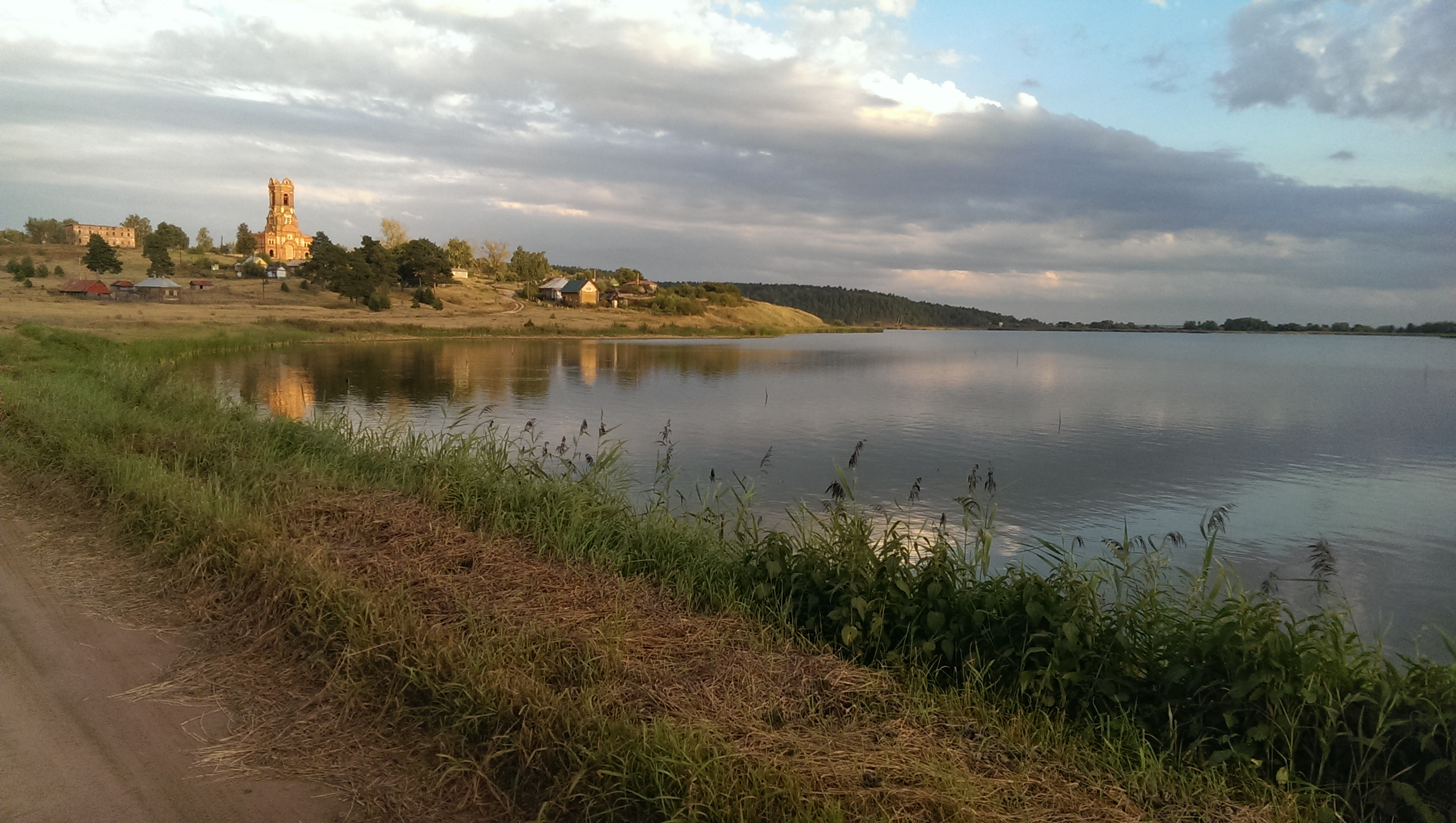
- Baykin Monastery, Sarayevsky District

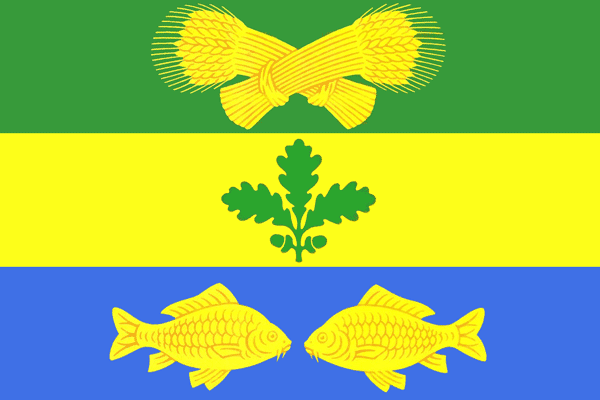
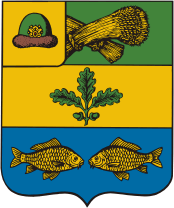
- Flag Coat of arms
- Location of Sarayevsky District in Ryazan Oblast
- Coordinates: 53°43′19″N 40°59′29″E
- Country: Russia
- Federal subject: Ryazan Oblast
- Established: 12 July 1929
- Administrative center: Sarai

Area
  - Total: 2,117 km^{2} (817 sq mi)

Population (2010 Census)
  - Total: 17,810
  - Density: 8.413/km^{2} (21.79/sq mi)
  - Urban: 32.6%
  - Rural: 67.4%

Administrative structure
  - Administrative divisions: 1 Work settlements, 25 Rural okrugs
  - Inhabited localities: 1 urban-type settlements, 153 rural localities

Municipal structure
  - Municipally incorporated as: Sarayevsky Municipal District
  - Municipal divisions: 1 urban settlements, 13 rural settlements
- Time zone: UTC+3 (MSK)
- OKTMO ID: 61640000
- Website: http://xn----7sbabirwicf2blqhff.xn--p1ai/

Sarayevsky District (Russian: Сара́евский райо́н) is an administrative and municipal district (raion), one of the twenty-five in Ryazan Oblast, Russia. It is located in the south of the oblast. The area of the district is 2,117 square kilometers (817 sq mi). Its administrative center is the urban locality (a work settlement) of Sarai. Population: 17,810 (2010 Census); 22,725 (2002 census); 28,819 (1989 Soviet census). The population of Sarai accounts for 32.6% of the district's total population.

== Notable residents ==
- Ivan Khabarov (1888–1960), Soviet Army Commander during World War II
- Sergei Mosyagin (born 1937), Soviet football player and coach, born in what was then Mozharskiy District
