= Korablinsky District =

Korablinsky District Кораблинский район (Russian)
- District
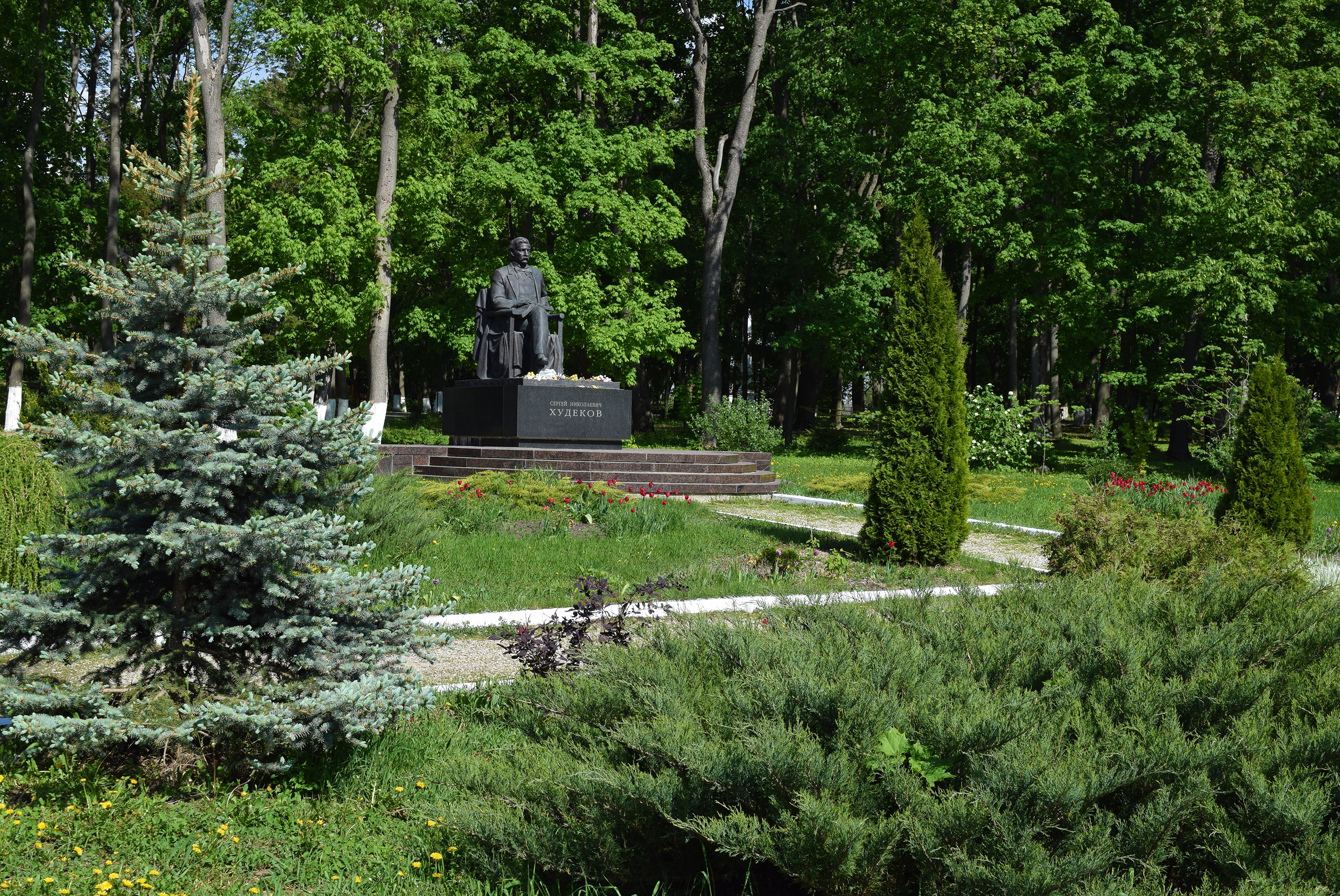
- Arboretum, Selo Erlino, Korablinsky District

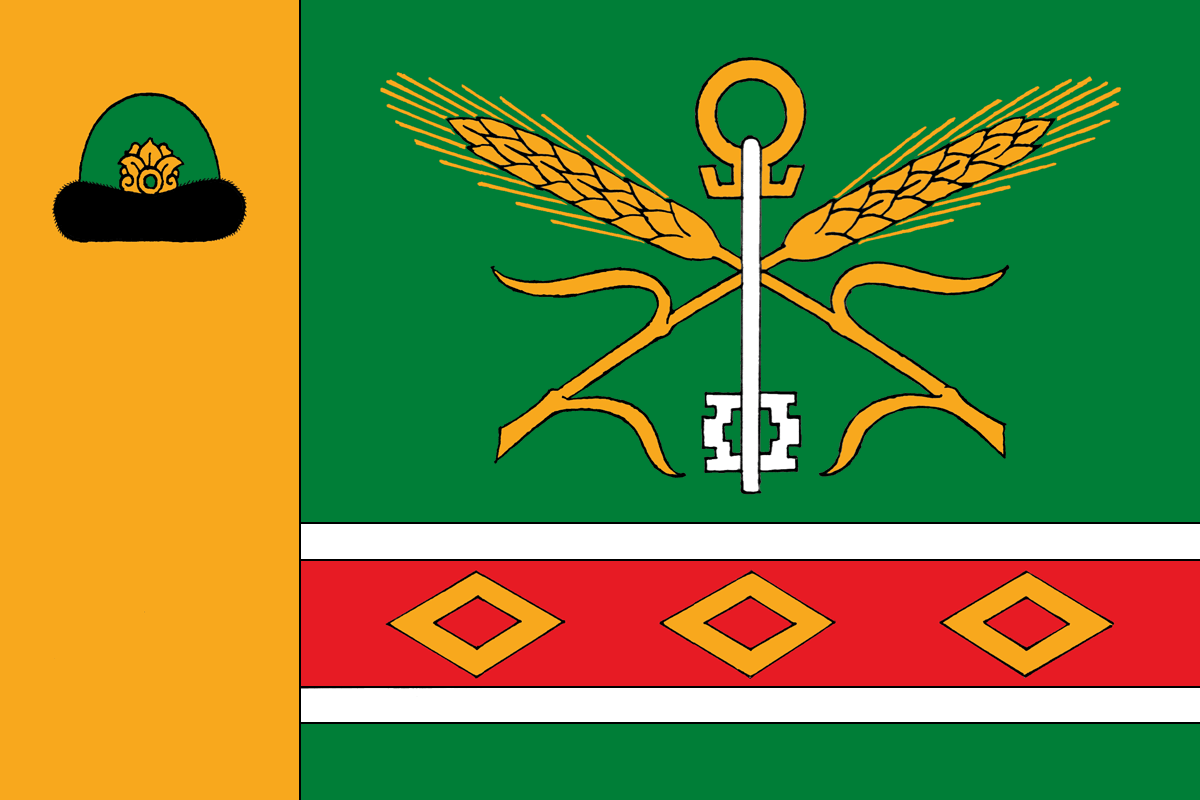
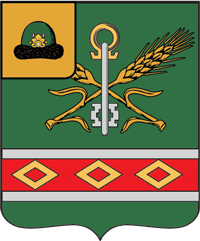
- Flag Coat of arms
- Location of Korablinsky District in Ryazan Oblast
- Coordinates: 53°55′N 40°01′E
- Country: Russia
- Federal subject: Ryazan Oblast
- Established: 12 July 1929
- Administrative center: Korablino

Area
  - Total: 1,171 km^{2} (452 sq mi)

Population (2010 Census)
  - Total: 22,941
  - Density: 19.59/km^{2} (50.74/sq mi)
  - Urban: 55.2%
  - Rural: 44.8%

Administrative structure
  - Administrative divisions: 1 Towns of district significance, 20 Rural okrugs
  - Inhabited localities: 1 cities/towns, 114 rural localities

Municipal structure
  - Municipally incorporated as: Korablinsky Municipal District
  - Municipal divisions: 1 urban settlements, 9 rural settlements
- Time zone: UTC+3 (MSK)
- OKTMO ID: 61612000
- Website: http://www.korablino62.ru/

Korablinsky District (Russian: Корабли́нский райо́н) is an administrative and municipal district (raion), one of the twenty-five in Ryazan Oblast, Russia. It is located in the southwestern central part of the oblast. The area of the district is 1,171 square kilometers (452 sq mi). Its administrative center is the town of Korablino. Population: 22,941 (2010 Census); 26,026 (2002 census); 28,144 (1989 Soviet census). The population of Korablino accounts for 55.2% of the district's total population.
