= Korablino, Korablinsky District, Ryazan Oblast =

Town in Ryazan Oblast, Russia

Korablino Кораблино
- Town
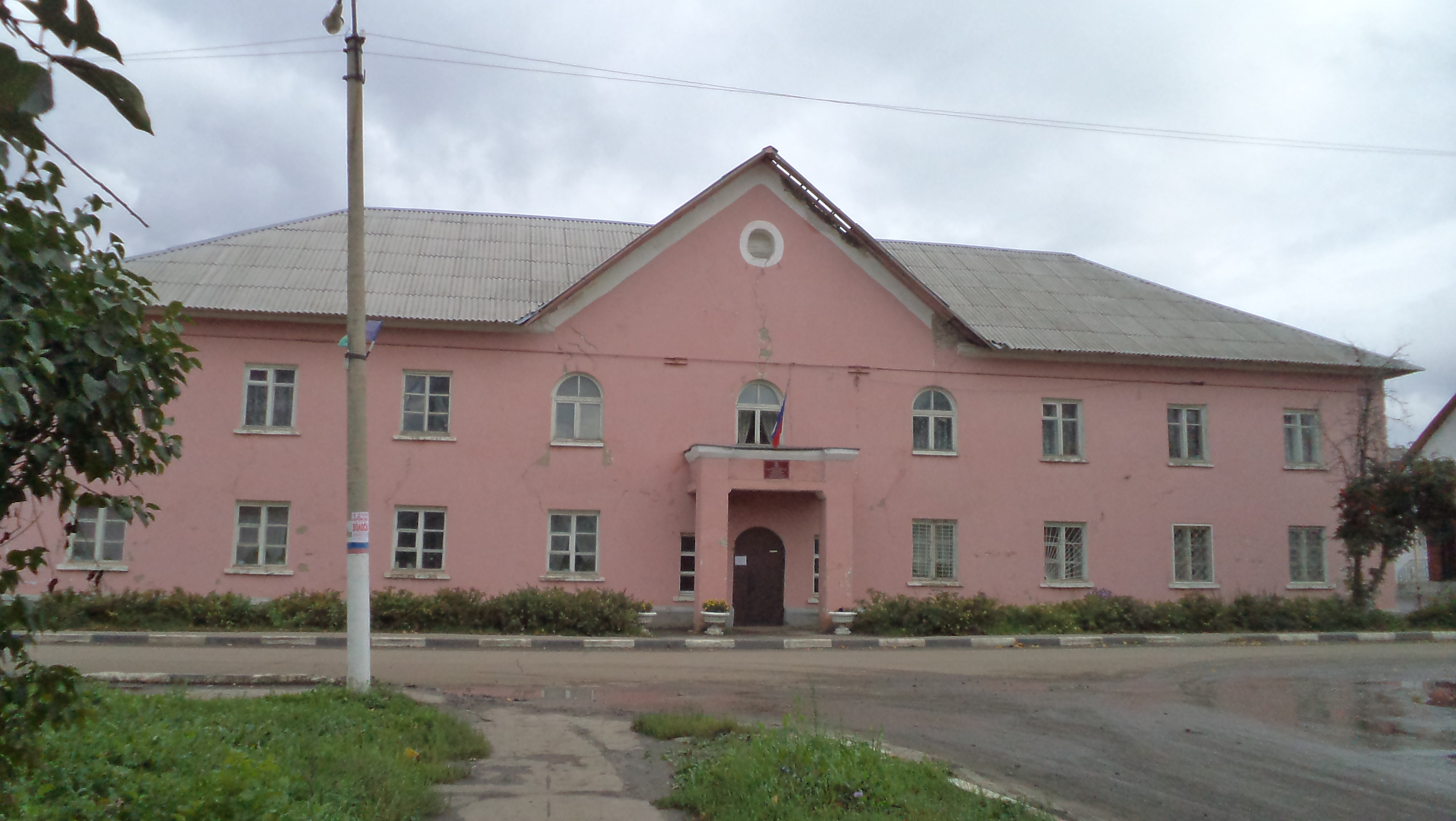
- Korablino Town Administration building

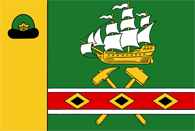
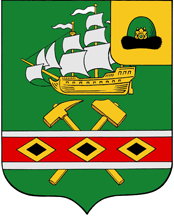
- Flag Coat of arms
- Interactive map of Korablino
- Location of Korablino Korablino (Ryazan Oblast)
- Coordinates: 53°55′N 40°01′E
- Country: Russia
- Federal subject: Ryazan Oblast
- Administrative district: Korablinsky District
- Town of district significanceSelsoviet: Korablino
- Founded: 1676
- Town status since: 1965
- Elevation: 135 m (443 ft)

Population (2010 Census)
  - Total: 12,658
  - Estimate (2023): 10,084 (−20.3%)

Administrative status
  - Capital of: Korablinsky District, town of district significance of Korablino

Municipal status
  - Municipal district: Korablinsky Municipal District
  - Urban settlement: Korablinskoye Urban Settlement
  - Capital of: Korablinsky Municipal District, Korablinskoye Urban Settlement
- Time zone: UTC+3 (MSK)
- Postal codes: 391200, 391201
- OKTMO ID: 61612101001

Korablino (Russian: Кораблино́) is a town and the administrative center of Korablinsky District in Ryazan Oblast, Russia, located 89 kilometers (55 mi) south of Ryazan, the administrative center of the oblast. Population: 12,658 (2010 census); 14,690 (2002 census); 15,349 (1989 Soviet census).

== History ==
It was founded in 1676 and granted town status in 1965.

== Administrative and municipal status ==
Within the framework of administrative divisions, Korablino serves as the administrative center of Korablinsky District. As an administrative division, it is incorporated within Korablinsky District as the town of district significance of Korablino. As a municipal division, the town of district significance of Korablino is incorporated within Korablinsky Municipal District as Korablinskoye Urban Settlement.
