= Starozhilovo, Ryazan Oblast =

Starozhilovo Старожилово
- Urban-type settlement
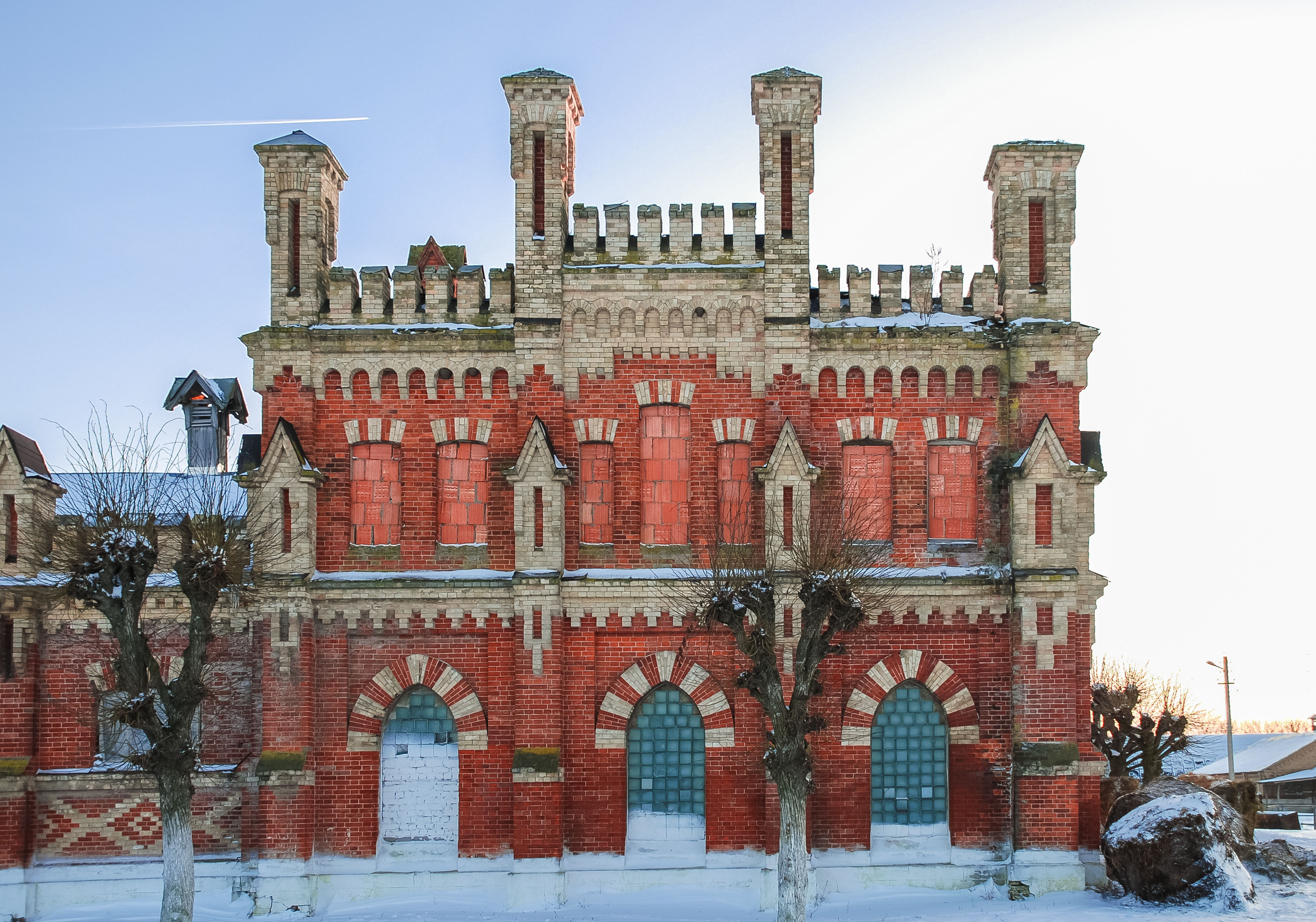
- Starozhilovo horse stud farm

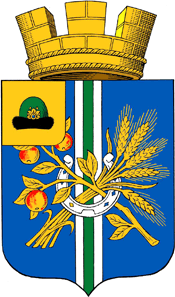
- Coat of arms
- Interactive map of Starozhilovo
- Location of Starozhilovo Starozhilovo (Ryazan Oblast)
- Coordinates: 54.2287°N 39.9107°E
- Country: Russia
- Federal subject: Ryazan Oblast
- Administrative district: Starozhilovsky District

Population (2010 Census)
  - Total: 5,088
  - Estimate (2023): 4,935 (−3%)
- Time zone: UTC+3 (MSK)
- Postal code: 391170
- OKTMO ID: 61648151051

Starozhilovo (Russian: Старожилово) is an urban locality (an urban-type settlement) in Starozhilovsky District of Ryazan Oblast, Russia. Population: 5,088 (2010 census); 5,279 (2002 census); 5,337 (1989 Soviet census).
