= Miloslavsky District =

Miloslavsky District Милославский район (Russian)
- District
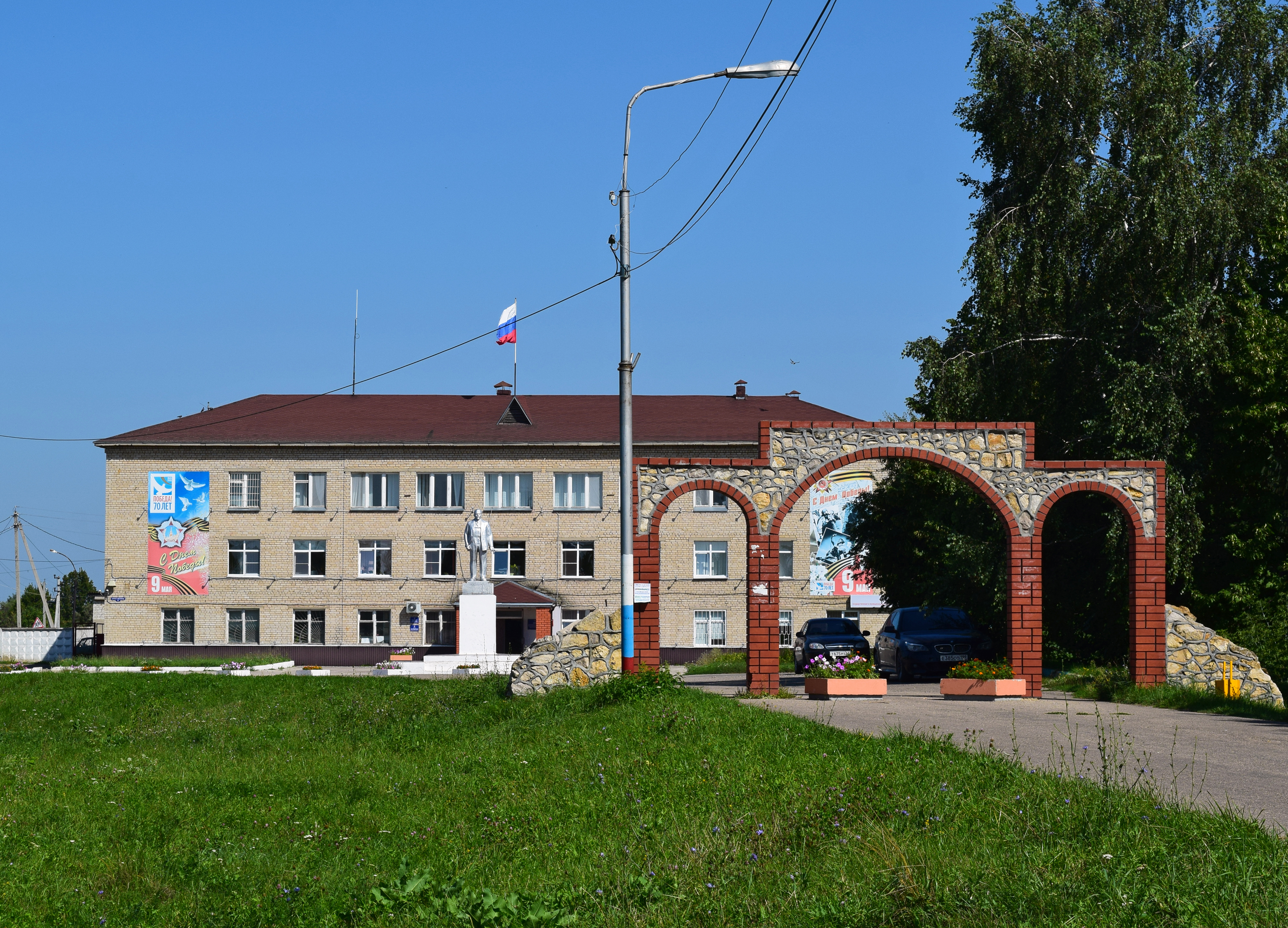
- Administration building in Miloslovkoye, Miloslavsky District

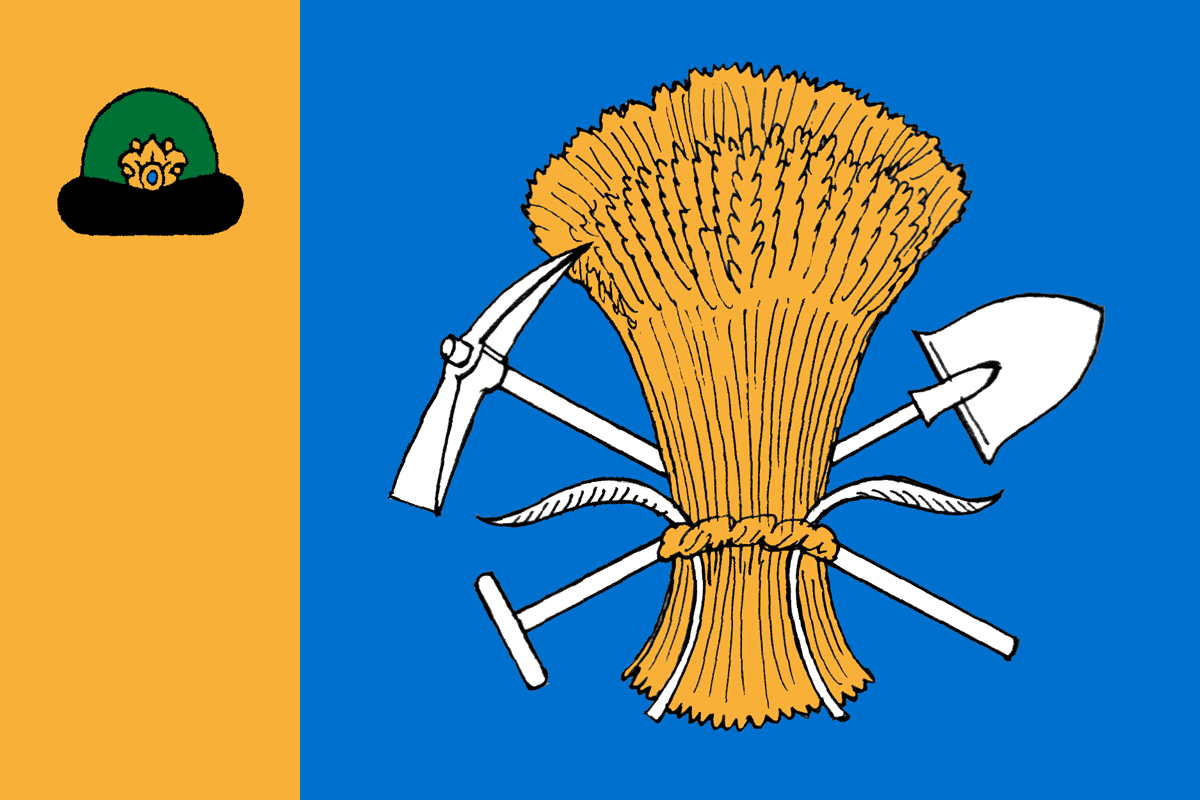
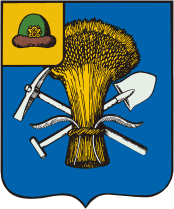
- Flag Coat of arms
- Location of Miloslavsky District in Ryazan Oblast
- Coordinates: 53°34′27″N 39°26′23″E
- Country: Russia
- Federal subject: Ryazan Oblast
- Established: 12 July 1929
- Administrative center: Miloslavskoye

Area
  - Total: 1,397 km^{2} (539 sq mi)

Population (2010 Census)
  - Total: 13,455
  - Density: 9.631/km^{2} (24.95/sq mi)
  - Urban: 49.3%
  - Rural: 50.7%

Administrative structure
  - Administrative divisions: 2 Work settlements, 17 Rural okrugs
  - Inhabited localities: 2 urban-type settlements, 118 rural localities

Municipal structure
  - Municipally incorporated as: Miloslavsky Municipal District
  - Municipal divisions: 2 urban settlements, 8 rural settlements
- Time zone: UTC+3 (MSK)
- OKTMO ID: 61615000
- Website: https://ryazangov.ru/local-government/list/875/

Miloslavsky District (Russian: Милосла́вский райо́н) is an administrative and municipal district (raion), one of the twenty-five in Ryazan Oblast, Russia. It is located in the southwest of the oblast. The area of the district is 1,397 square kilometers (539 sq mi). Its administrative center is the urban locality (a work settlement) of Miloslavskoye. Population: 13,455 (2010 Census); 16,564 (2002 census); 20,808 (1989 Soviet census). The population of Miloslavskoye accounts for 33.3% of the district's total population.

== Notable residents ==
- Vasily Alekseyev (1942–2011), Soviet Olympic weightlifter, born in Pokrovo-Shishkino
