= Nikolayevka, Russia =

Nikolayevka (Russian: Никола́евка) is the name of several inhabited localities in Russia.

== Altai Krai ==
As of 2010, nine rural localities in Altai Krai bear this name:

- Nikolayevka, Blagoveshchensky District, Altai Krai, a selo in Nikolayevsky Selsoviet of Blagoveshchensky District
- Nikolayevka, Loktevsky District, Altai Krai, a selo in Nikolayevsky Selsoviet of Loktevsky District
- Nikolayevka (selo), Nikolayevsky Selsoviet, Mikhaylovsky District, Altai Krai, a selo in Nikolayevsky Selsoviet of Mikhaylovsky District
- Nikolayevka (station), Nikolayevsky Selsoviet, Mikhaylovsky District, Altai Krai, a station in Nikolayevsky Selsoviet of Mikhaylovsky District
- Nikolayevka, Nemetsky National District, Altai Krai, a selo in Nikolayevsky Selsoviet of Nemetsky National District
- Nikolayevka, Petropavlovsky District, Altai Krai, a selo in Nikolayevsky Selsoviet of Petropavlovsky District
- Nikolayevka, Pospelikhinsky District, Altai Krai, a selo in Nikolayevsky Selsoviet of Pospelikhinsky District
- Nikolayevka, Suyetsky District, Altai Krai, a settlement in Boronsky Selsoviet of Suyetsky District
- Nikolayevka, Tabunsky District, Altai Krai, a selo in Belozersky Selsoviet of Tabunsky District

== Amur Oblast ==
As of 2010, four rural localities in Amur Oblast bear this name:

- Nikolayevka, Bureysky District, Amur Oblast, a selo under the administrative jurisdiction of Novobureysky Urban Settlement of Bureysky District
- Nikolayevka, Ivanovsky District, Amur Oblast, a selo in Nikolayevsky Rural Settlement of Ivanovsky District
- Nikolayevka, Tambovsky District, Amur Oblast, a selo in Nikolayevsky Rural Settlement of Tambovsky District
- Nikolayevka, Zeysky District, Amur Oblast, a selo in Nikolayevsky Rural Settlement of Zeysky District

== Arkhangelsk Oblast ==
As of 2010, one rural locality in Arkhangelsk Oblast bears this name:

- Nikolayevka, Arkhangelsk Oblast, a village in Podyuzhsky Selsoviet of Konoshsky District

== Astrakhan Oblast ==
As of 2010, two rural localities in Astrakhan Oblast bear this name:

- Nikolayevka, Narimanovsky District, Astrakhan Oblast, a selo in Nikolayevsky Selsoviet of Narimanovsky District
- Nikolayevka, Yenotayevsky District, Astrakhan Oblast, a selo in Ivanovo-Nikolayevsky Selsoviet of Yenotayevsky District

== Republic of Bashkortostan ==
As of 2010, seventeen rural localities in the Republic of Bashkortostan bear this name:

- Nikolayevka, Alsheyevsky District, Republic of Bashkortostan, a village in Abdrashitovsky Selsoviet of Alsheyevsky District
- Nikolayevka, Arkhangelsky District, Republic of Bashkortostan, a village in Orlovsky Selsoviet of Arkhangelsky District
- Nikolayevka, Aurgazinsky District, Republic of Bashkortostan, a village in Batyrovsky Selsoviet of Aurgazinsky District
- Nikolayevka, Bakalinsky District, Republic of Bashkortostan, a selo in Diyashevsky Selsoviet of Bakalinsky District
- Nikolayevka, Beloretsky District, Republic of Bashkortostan, a selo in Nikolayevsky Selsoviet of Beloretsky District
- Nikolayevka, Birsky District, Republic of Bashkortostan, a selo in Burnovsky Selsoviet of Birsky District
- Nikolayevka, Blagoveshchensky District, Republic of Bashkortostan, a selo in Nikolayevsky Selsoviet of Blagoveshchensky District
- Nikolayevka, Burayevsky District, Republic of Bashkortostan, a village in Teplyakovsky Selsoviet of Burayevsky District
- Nikolayevka, Chekmagushevsky District, Republic of Bashkortostan, a village in Novobaltachevsky Selsoviet of Chekmagushevsky District
- Nikolayevka, Fyodorovsky District, Republic of Bashkortostan, a village in Dedovsky Selsoviet of Fyodorovsky District
- Nikolayevka, Karmaskalinsky District, Republic of Bashkortostan, a selo in Nikolayevsky Selsoviet of Karmaskalinsky District
- Nikolayevka, Mishkinsky District, Republic of Bashkortostan, a village in Kameyevsky Selsoviet of Mishkinsky District
- Nikolayevka, Miyakinsky District, Republic of Bashkortostan, a village in Miyakibashevsky Selsoviet of Miyakinsky District
- Nikolayevka, Alataninsky Selsoviet, Sterlitamaksky District, Republic of Bashkortostan, a village in Alataninsky Selsoviet of Sterlitamaksky District
- Nikolayevka, Nikolayevsky Selsoviet, Sterlitamaksky District, Republic of Bashkortostan, a selo in Nikolayevsky Selsoviet of Sterlitamaksky District
- Nikolayevka, Tuymazinsky District, Republic of Bashkortostan, a selo in Nikolayevsky Selsoviet of Tuymazinsky District
- Nikolayevka, Ufimsky District, Republic of Bashkortostan, a village in Nikolayevsky Selsoviet of Ufimsky District

== Belgorod Oblast ==
As of 2010, seven rural localities in Belgorod Oblast bear this name:

- Nikolayevka (selo), Alexeyevsky District, Belgorod Oblast, a selo in Alexeyevsky District
- Nikolayevka (settlement), Alexeyevsky District, Belgorod Oblast, a settlement in Alexeyevsky District
- Nikolayevka, Belgorodsky District, Belgorod Oblast, a selo in Belgorodsky District
- Nikolayevka, Novooskolsky District, Belgorod Oblast, a selo in Novooskolsky District
- Nikolayevka, Starooskolsky District, Belgorod Oblast, a selo in Starooskolsky District
- Nikolayevka, Starooskolsky District, Belgorod Oblast, a selo in Starooskolsky District
- Nikolayevka, Veydelevsky District, Belgorod Oblast, a selo in Veydelevsky District

== Bryansk Oblast ==
As of 2010, seven rural localities in Bryansk Oblast bear this name:

- Nikolayevka, Bryansky District, Bryansk Oblast, a village in Zhurinichsky Rural Administrative Okrug of Bryansky District
- Nikolayevka, Kletnyansky District, Bryansk Oblast, a village in Muzhinovsky Rural Administrative Okrug of Kletnyansky District
- Nikolayevka, Krasnogorsky District, Bryansk Oblast, a selo in Kolyudovsky Rural Administrative Okrug of Krasnogorsky District
- Nikolayevka, Mglinsky District, Bryansk Oblast, a village in Molodkovsky Rural Administrative Okrug of Mglinsky District
- Nikolayevka, Surazhsky District, Bryansk Oblast, a village in Degtyarevsky Rural Administrative Okrug of Surazhsky District
- Nikolayevka, Vygonichsky District, Bryansk Oblast, a village under the administrative jurisdiction of Vygonichsky Settlement Administrative Okrug of Vygonichsky District
- Nikolayevka, Zhukovsky District, Bryansk Oblast, a village in Khodilovichsky Rural Administrative Okrug of Zhukovsky District

== Chelyabinsk Oblast ==
As of 2010, two rural localities in Chelyabinsk Oblast bear this name:

- Nikolayevka, Varnensky District, Chelyabinsk Oblast, a selo in Nikolayevsky Selsoviet of Varnensky District
- Nikolayevka, Yetkulsky District, Chelyabinsk Oblast, a village in Karatabansky Selsoviet of Yetkulsky District

== Irkutsk Oblast ==
As of 2010, one rural locality in Irkutsk Oblast bears this name:

- Nikolayevka, Irkutsk Oblast, a selo in Tayshetsky District

== Ivanovo Oblast ==
As of 2010, one rural locality in Ivanovo Oblast bears this name:

- Nikolayevka, Ivanovo Oblast, a village in Rodnikovsky District

== Jewish Autonomous Oblast ==
As of 2010, one urban locality in the Jewish Autonomous Oblast bears this name:

- Nikolayevka, Jewish Autonomous Oblast, a settlement in Smidovichsky District

== Kaliningrad Oblast ==
As of 2010, one rural locality in Kaliningrad Oblast bears this name:

- Nikolayevka, Kaliningrad Oblast, a settlement in Novostroyevsky Rural Okrug of Ozyorsky District

== Kaluga Oblast ==
As of 2010, nine rural localities in Kaluga Oblast bear this name:

- Nikolayevka, Borovsky District, Kaluga Oblast, a village in Borovsky District
- Nikolayevka, Duminichsky District, Kaluga Oblast, a village in Duminichsky District
- Nikolayevka, Dzerzhinsky District, Kaluga Oblast, a village in Dzerzhinsky District
- Nikolayevka (Brontsy Rural Settlement), Ferzikovsky District, Kaluga Oblast, a village in Ferzikovsky District; municipally, a part of Brontsy Rural Settlement of that district
- Nikolayevka (Dugna Urban Settlement), Ferzikovsky District, Kaluga Oblast, a village in Ferzikovsky District; municipally, a part of Dugna Urban Settlement of that district
- Nikolayevka, Lyudinovsky District, Kaluga Oblast, a village in Lyudinovsky District
- Nikolayevka, Maloyaroslavetsky District, Kaluga Oblast, a village in Maloyaroslavetsky District
- Nikolayevka, Peremyshlsky District, Kaluga Oblast, a village in Peremyshlsky District
- Nikolayevka, Ulyanovsky District, Kaluga Oblast, a village in Ulyanovsky District

== Kamchatka Krai ==
As of 2010, one rural locality in Kamchatka Krai bears this name:

- Nikolayevka, Kamchatka Krai, a selo in Yelizovsky District

== Kemerovo Oblast ==
As of 2010, two rural localities in Kemerovo Oblast bear this name:

- Nikolayevka, Chebulinsky District, Kemerovo Oblast, a selo in Usmanskaya Rural Territory of Chebulinsky District
- Nikolayevka, Novokuznetsky District, Kemerovo Oblast, a settlement in Kurtukovskaya Rural Territory of Novokuznetsky District

== Republic of Khakassia ==
As of 2010, one rural locality in the Republic of Khakassia bears this name:

- Nikolayevka, Republic of Khakassia, a village in Balyksinsky Selsoviet of Askizsky District

== Kirov Oblast ==
As of 2010, one rural locality in Kirov Oblast bears this name:

- Nikolayevka, Kirov Oblast, a village under the administrative jurisdiction of the urban-type settlement of Nema in Nemsky District

== Krasnodar Krai ==
As of 2010, one rural locality in Krasnodar Krai bears this name:

- Nikolayevka, Krasnodar Krai, a selo in Nikolayevsky Rural Okrug of Shcherbinovsky District

== Krasnoyarsk Krai ==
As of 2010, ten rural localities in Krasnoyarsk Krai bear this name:

- Nikolayevka, Dzerzhinsky District, Krasnoyarsk Krai, a village in Alexandro-Yershinsky Selsoviet of Dzerzhinsky District
- Nikolayevka, Idrinsky District, Krasnoyarsk Krai, a village in Romanovsky Selsoviet of Idrinsky District
- Nikolayevka, Irbeysky District, Krasnoyarsk Krai, a village in Ivanovsky Selsoviet of Irbeysky District
- Nikolayevka, Kansky District, Krasnoyarsk Krai, a village in Mokrushinsky Selsoviet of Kansky District
- Nikolayevka, Krasnoturansky District, Krasnoyarsk Krai, a village in Sayansky Selsoviet of Krasnoturansky District
- Nikolayevka, Kuraginsky District, Krasnoyarsk Krai, a village in Kursky Selsoviet of Kuraginsky District
- Nikolayevka, Novosyolovsky District, Krasnoyarsk Krai, a village in Svetlolobovsky Selsoviet of Novosyolovsky District
- Nikolayevka, Tyukhtetsky District, Krasnoyarsk Krai, a settlement in Leontyevsky Selsoviet of Tyukhtetsky District
- Nikolayevka, Uyarsky District, Krasnoyarsk Krai, a village in Tolstikhinsky Selsoviet of Uyarsky District
- Nikolayevka, Yermakovsky District, Krasnoyarsk Krai, a village in Yermakovsky Selsoviet of Yermakovsky District

== Kurgan Oblast ==
As of 2010, two rural localities in Kurgan Oblast bear this name:

- Nikolayevka, Shchuchansky District, Kurgan Oblast, a selo in Nikolayevsky Selsoviet of Shchuchansky District
- Nikolayevka, Tselinny District, Kurgan Oblast, a village in Kislyansky Selsoviet of Tselinny District

== Kursk Oblast ==
As of 2010, ten rural localities in Kursk Oblast bear this name:

- Nikolayevka, Gorshechensky District, Kursk Oblast, a village in Bykovsky Selsoviet of Gorshechensky District
- Nikolayevka, Kastorensky District, Kursk Oblast, a selo in Krasnoznamensky Selsoviet of Kastorensky District
- Nikolayevka, Kurchatovsky District, Kursk Oblast, a village in Nikolayevsky Selsoviet of Kurchatovsky District
- Nikolayevka, Brezhnevsky Selsoviet, Kursky District, Kursk Oblast, a village in Brezhnevsky Selsoviet of Kursky District
- Nikolayevka, Verkhnekasinovsky Selsoviet, Kursky District, Kursk Oblast, a village in Verkhnekasinovsky Selsoviet of Kursky District
- Nikolayevka, Borisovsky Selsoviet, Lgovsky District, Kursk Oblast, a village in Borisovsky Selsoviet of Lgovsky District
- Nikolayevka, Maritsky Selsoviet, Lgovsky District, Kursk Oblast, a village in Maritsky Selsoviet of Lgovsky District
- Nikolayevka, Medvensky District, Kursk Oblast, a village in Paninsky Selsoviet of Medvensky District
- Nikolayevka, Sudzhansky District, Kursk Oblast, a village in Maloloknyansky Selsoviet of Sudzhansky District
- Nikolayevka, Zolotukhinsky District, Kursk Oblast, a selo in Revolyutsionny Selsoviet of Zolotukhinsky District

== Lipetsk Oblast ==
As of 2010, nine rural localities in Lipetsk Oblast bear this name:

- Nikolayevka, Dankovsky District, Lipetsk Oblast, a village in Voskresensky Selsoviet of Dankovsky District
- Nikolayevka, Dobrinsky District, Lipetsk Oblast, a village in Petrovsky Selsoviet of Dobrinsky District
- Nikolayevka, Dobrovsky District, Lipetsk Oblast, a village in Korenevshchinsky Selsoviet of Dobrovsky District
- Nikolayevka, Dolgorukovsky District, Lipetsk Oblast, a village in Veselovsky Selsoviet of Dolgorukovsky District
- Nikolayevka, Petrovsky Selsoviet, Izmalkovsky District, Lipetsk Oblast, a village in Petrovsky Selsoviet of Izmalkovsky District
- Nikolayevka, Preobrazhensky Selsoviet, Izmalkovsky District, Lipetsk Oblast, a village in Preobrazhensky Selsoviet of Izmalkovsky District
- Nikolayevka, Krasninsky District, Lipetsk Oblast, a village in Alexandrovsky Selsoviet of Krasninsky District
- Nikolayevka, Lev-Tolstovsky District, Lipetsk Oblast, a village in Novochemodanovsky Selsoviet of Lev-Tolstovsky District
- Nikolayevka, Yeletsky District, Lipetsk Oblast, a village in Arkhangelsky Selsoviet of Yeletsky District

== Mari El Republic ==
As of 2010, one rural locality in the Mari El Republic bears this name:

- Nikolayevka, Mari El Republic, a village in Mikhaylovsky Rural Okrug of Sovetsky District

== Republic of Mordovia ==
As of 2010, six inhabited localities in the Republic of Mordovia bear this name:

- Nikolayevka, Saransk, Republic of Mordovia, a work settlement under the administrative jurisdiction of the city of republic significance of Saransk
- Nikolayevka, Bolshebereznikovsky District, Republic of Mordovia, a selo in Bolshebereznikovsky Selsoviet of Bolshebereznikovsky District
- Nikolayevka, Dubyonsky District, Republic of Mordovia, a selo in Nikolayevsky Selsoviet of Dubyonsky District
- Nikolayevka, Lyambirsky District, Republic of Mordovia, a village in Dalny Selsoviet of Lyambirsky District
- Nikolayevka, Staroshaygovsky District, Republic of Mordovia, a selo in Lemdyaysky Selsoviet of Staroshaygovsky District
- Nikolayevka, Temnikovsky District, Republic of Mordovia, a village in Lavrentyevsky Selsoviet of Temnikovsky District

== Moscow Oblast ==
As of 2010, three rural localities in Moscow Oblast bear this name:

- Nikolayevka, Klinsky District, Moscow Oblast, a village in Nudolskoye Rural Settlement of Klinsky District
- Nikolayevka, Mochilskoye Rural Settlement, Serebryano-Prudsky District, Moscow Oblast, a village in Mochilskoye Rural Settlement of Serebryano-Prudsky District
- Nikolayevka, Uzunovskoye Rural Settlement, Serebryano-Prudsky District, Moscow Oblast, a village in Uzunovskoye Rural Settlement of Serebryano-Prudsky District

== Nizhny Novgorod Oblast ==
As of 2010, nine rural localities in Nizhny Novgorod Oblast bear this name:

- Nikolayevka, Semyonov, Nizhny Novgorod Oblast, a village in Bokovskoy Selsoviet of the city of oblast significance of Semyonov
- Nikolayevka, Pervomaysk, Nizhny Novgorod Oblast, a selo under the administrative jurisdiction of the city of oblast significance of Pervomaysk
- Nikolayevka, Bolshemurashkinsky District, Nizhny Novgorod Oblast, a village in Sovetsky Selsoviet of Bolshemurashkinsky District
- Nikolayevka, Knyagininsky District, Nizhny Novgorod Oblast, a village in Vozrozhdensky Selsoviet of Knyagininsky District
- Nikolayevka, Lukoyanovsky District, Nizhny Novgorod Oblast, a village in Shandrovsky Selsoviet of Lukoyanovsky District
- Nikolayevka, Sechenovsky District, Nizhny Novgorod Oblast, a village in Kochetovsky Selsoviet of Sechenovsky District
- Nikolayevka, Sergachsky District, Nizhny Novgorod Oblast, a village in Andreyevsky Selsoviet of Sergachsky District
- Nikolayevka, Sosnovsky District, Nizhny Novgorod Oblast, a selo in Rozhkovsky Selsoviet of Sosnovsky District
- Nikolayevka, Vorotynsky District, Nizhny Novgorod Oblast, a village in Krasnogorsky Selsoviet of Vorotynsky District

== Novgorod Oblast ==
As of 2010, two rural localities in Novgorod Oblast bear this name:

- Nikolayevka, Lyubytinsky District, Novgorod Oblast, a village under the administrative jurisdiction of Lyubytinskoye Settlement of Lyubytinsky District
- Nikolayevka, Shimsky District, Novgorod Oblast, a village in Podgoshchskoye Settlement of Shimsky District

== Novosibirsk Oblast ==
As of 2010, four rural localities in Novosibirsk Oblast bear this name:

- Nikolayevka, Chanovsky District, Novosibirsk Oblast, a village in Chanovsky District
- Nikolayevka, Kuybyshevsky District, Novosibirsk Oblast, a village in Kuybyshevsky District
- Nikolayevka, Kyshtovsky District, Novosibirsk Oblast, a village in Kyshtovsky District
- Nikolayevka, Tatarsky District, Novosibirsk Oblast, a selo in Tatarsky District

== Omsk Oblast ==
As of 2010, seven rural localities in Omsk Oblast bear this name:

- Nikolayevka, Cherlaksky District, Omsk Oblast, a selo in Nikolayevsky Rural Okrug of Cherlaksky District
- Nikolayevka, Gorkovsky District, Omsk Oblast, a village in Sukhovskoy Rural Okrug of Gorkovsky District
- Nikolayevka, Kolosovsky District, Omsk Oblast, a village in Kutyrlinsky Rural Okrug of Kolosovsky District
- Nikolayevka, Moskalensky District, Omsk Oblast, a village in Zvezdinsky Rural Okrug of Moskalensky District
- Nikolayevka, Nizhneomsky District, Omsk Oblast, a village in Staromalinovsky Rural Okrug of Nizhneomsky District
- Nikolayevka, Okoneshnikovsky District, Omsk Oblast, a village in Zolotonivsky Rural Okrug of Okoneshnikovsky District
- Nikolayevka, Sargatsky District, Omsk Oblast, a village in Bazhenovsky Rural Okrug of Sargatsky District

== Orenburg Oblast ==
As of 2010, ten rural localities in Orenburg Oblast bear this name:

- Nikolayevka, Alexandrovsky District, Orenburg Oblast, a selo in Zhdanovsky Selsoviet of Alexandrovsky District
- Nikolayevka, Asekeyevsky District, Orenburg Oblast, a selo in Yakovlevsky Selsoviet of Asekeyevsky District
- Nikolayevka, Polibinsky Selsoviet, Buguruslansky District, Orenburg Oblast, a selo in Polibinsky Selsoviet of Buguruslansky District
- Nikolayevka, Sovetsky Selsoviet, Buguruslansky District, Orenburg Oblast, a settlement in Sovetsky Selsoviet of Buguruslansky District
- Nikolayevka, Kairovsky Selsoviet, Saraktashsky District, Orenburg Oblast, a village in Kairovsky Selsoviet of Saraktashsky District
- Nikolayevka, Nikolayevsky Selsoviet, Saraktashsky District, Orenburg Oblast, a selo in Nikolayevsky Selsoviet of Saraktashsky District
- Nikolayevka, Sharlyksky District, Orenburg Oblast, a selo in Novomusinsky Selsoviet of Sharlyksky District
- Nikolayevka, Sorochinsky District, Orenburg Oblast, a selo in Nikolayevsky Selsoviet of Sorochinsky District
- Nikolayevka, Totsky District, Orenburg Oblast, a selo in Preobrazhensky Selsoviet of Totsky District
- Nikolayevka, Tyulgansky District, Orenburg Oblast, a selo in Troitsky Selsoviet of Tyulgansky District

== Oryol Oblast ==
As of 2010, two rural localities in Oryol Oblast bear this name:

- Nikolayevka, Pokrovsky District, Oryol Oblast, a village in Zhuravetsky Selsoviet of Pokrovsky District
- Nikolayevka, Zalegoshchensky District, Oryol Oblast, a village in Verkhneskvorchensky Selsoviet of Zalegoshchensky District

== Penza Oblast ==
As of 2010, eleven rural localities in Penza Oblast bear this name:

- Nikolayevka, Bashmakovsky District, Penza Oblast, a selo in Kandiyevsky Selsoviet of Bashmakovsky District
- Nikolayevka, Bekovsky District, Penza Oblast, a village in Yakovlevsky Selsoviet of Bekovsky District
- Nikolayevka, Bessonovsky District, Penza Oblast, a settlement in Bessonovsky Selsoviet of Bessonovsky District
- Nikolayevka, Issinsky District, Penza Oblast, a selo in Uvarovsky Selsoviet of Issinsky District
- Nikolayevka, Kamensky District, Penza Oblast, a village in Vladykinsky Selsoviet of Kamensky District
- Nikolayevka, Lopatinsky District, Penza Oblast, a selo in Lopatinsky Selsoviet of Lopatinsky District
- Nikolayevka, Luninsky District, Penza Oblast, a village in Bolotnikovsky Selsoviet of Luninsky District
- Nikolayevka, Maloserdobinsky District, Penza Oblast, a selo in Lipovsky Selsoviet of Maloserdobinsky District
- Nikolayevka, Mokshansky District, Penza Oblast, a village in Plessky Selsoviet of Mokshansky District
- Nikolayevka, Olenevsky Selsoviet, Penzensky District, Penza Oblast, a village in Olenevsky Selsoviet of Penzensky District
- Nikolayevka, Salovsky Selsoviet, Penzensky District, Penza Oblast, a selo in Salovsky Selsoviet of Penzensky District

== Primorsky Krai ==
As of 2010, two rural localities in Primorsky Krai bear this name:

- Nikolayevka, Mikhaylovsky District, Primorsky Krai, a selo in Mikhaylovsky District
- Nikolayevka, Partizansky District, Primorsky Krai, a settlement in Partizansky District

== Rostov Oblast ==
As of 2010, four rural localities in Rostov Oblast bear this name:

- Nikolayevka, Millerovsky District, Rostov Oblast, a khutor in Turilovskoye Rural Settlement of Millerovsky District
- Nikolayevka, Neklinovsky District, Rostov Oblast, a selo in Nikolayevskoye Rural Settlement of Neklinovsky District
- Nikolayevka, Oktyabrsky District, Rostov Oblast, a khutor in Mokrologskoye Rural Settlement of Oktyabrsky District
- Nikolayevka, Peschanokopsky District, Rostov Oblast, a selo in Polivyanskoye Rural Settlement of Peschanokopsky District

== Ryazan Oblast ==
As of 2010, twelve rural localities in Ryazan Oblast bear this name:

- Nikolayevka, Kadomsky District, Ryazan Oblast, a village in Sumersky Rural Okrug of Kadomsky District
- Nikolayevka, Kasimovsky District, Ryazan Oblast, a village in Ardabyevsky Rural Okrug of Kasimovsky District
- Nikolayevka, Korablinsky District, Ryazan Oblast, a village in Nikolayevsky Rural Okrug of Korablinsky District
- Nikolayevka, Ilyichevsky Rural Okrug, Mikhaylovsky District, Ryazan Oblast, a village in Ilyichevsky Rural Okrug of Mikhaylovsky District
- Nikolayevka, Rachatnikovsky Rural Okrug, Mikhaylovsky District, Ryazan Oblast, a selo in Rachatnikovsky Rural Okrug of Mikhaylovsky District
- Nikolayevka, Chernavsky Rural Okrug, Miloslavsky District, Ryazan Oblast, a village in Chernavsky Rural Okrug of Miloslavsky District
- Nikolayevka, Danilovsky Rural Okrug, Miloslavsky District, Ryazan Oblast, a village in Danilovsky Rural Okrug of Miloslavsky District
- Nikolayevka, Alexandro-Nevsky District, Ryazan Oblast, a village in Pavlovsky Rural Okrug of Alexandro-Nevsky District
- Nikolayevka, Sarayevsky District, Ryazan Oblast, a village in Boretsky Rural Okrug of Sarayevsky District
- Nikolayevka, Sasovsky District, Ryazan Oblast, a village in Verkhne-Nikolsky Rural Okrug of Sasovsky District
- Nikolayevka, Shilovsky District, Ryazan Oblast, a village in Mosolovsky Rural Okrug of Shilovsky District
- Nikolayevka, Yermishinsky District, Ryazan Oblast, a village in Nadezhkinsky Rural Okrug of Yermishinsky District

== Samara Oblast ==
As of 2010, three rural localities in Samara Oblast bear this name:

- Nikolayevka, Koshkinsky District, Samara Oblast, a village in Koshkinsky District
- Nikolayevka, Krasnoyarsky District, Samara Oblast, a village in Krasnoyarsky District
- Nikolayevka, Volzhsky District, Samara Oblast, a selo in Volzhsky District

== Saratov Oblast ==
As of 2010, twelve rural localities in Saratov Oblast bear this name:

- Nikolayevka, Atkarsky District, Saratov Oblast, a village in Atkarsky District
- Nikolayevka, Fyodorovsky District, Saratov Oblast, a selo in Fyodorovsky District
- Nikolayevka, Ivanteyevsky District, Saratov Oblast, a selo in Ivanteyevsky District
- Nikolayevka, Kalininsky District, Saratov Oblast, a village in Kalininsky District
- Nikolayevka, Kalininsky District, Saratov Oblast, a village in Kalininsky District
- Nikolayevka, Lysogorsky District, Saratov Oblast, a village in Lysogorsky District
- Nikolayevka, Perelyubsky District, Saratov Oblast, a village in Perelyubsky District
- Nikolayevka, Petrovsky District, Saratov Oblast, a selo in Petrovsky District
- Nikolayevka, Samoylovsky District, Saratov Oblast, a selo in Samoylovsky District
- Nikolayevka, Turkovsky District, Saratov Oblast, a village in Turkovsky District
- Nikolayevka, Volsky District, Saratov Oblast, a selo in Volsky District
- Nikolayevka, Yekaterinovsky District, Saratov Oblast, a village in Yekaterinovsky District

== Smolensk Oblast ==
As of 2010, four rural localities in Smolensk Oblast bear this name:

- Nikolayevka, Khislavichsky District, Smolensk Oblast, a village in Vladimirovskoye Rural Settlement of Khislavichsky District
- Nikolayevka, Krasninsky District, Smolensk Oblast, a village in Oktyabrskoye Rural Settlement of Krasninsky District
- Nikolayevka, Tyomkinsky District, Smolensk Oblast, a village in Kikinskoye Rural Settlement of Tyomkinsky District
- Nikolayevka, Yershichsky District, Smolensk Oblast, a village in Besedkovskoye Rural Settlement of Yershichsky District

== Tambov Oblast ==
As of 2010, eleven rural localities in Tambov Oblast bear this name:

- Nikolayevka, Kirsanovsky District, Tambov Oblast, a village in Sokolovsky Selsoviet of Kirsanovsky District
- Nikolayevka, Mordovsky District, Tambov Oblast, a village in Shulginsky Selsoviet of Mordovsky District
- Nikolayevka, Morshansky District, Tambov Oblast, a selo in Starotomnikovsky Selsoviet of Morshansky District
- Nikolayevka, Petrovsky District, Tambov Oblast, a village in Petrovsky Selsoviet of Petrovsky District
- Nikolayevka, Pichayevsky District, Tambov Oblast, a village in Pokrovo-Vasilyevsky Selsoviet of Pichayevsky District
- Nikolayevka, Rzhaksinsky District, Tambov Oblast, a village in Gavrilovsky Selsoviet of Rzhaksinsky District
- Nikolayevka, Avdeyevsky Selsoviet, Tambovsky District, Tambov Oblast, a village in Avdeyevsky Selsoviet of Tambovsky District
- Nikolayevka, Krasnosvobodnensky Selsoviet, Tambovsky District, Tambov Oblast, a village in Krasnosvobodnensky Selsoviet of Tambovsky District
- Nikolayevka, Alexandrovsky Selsoviet, Tokaryovsky District, Tambov Oblast, a village in Alexandrovsky Selsoviet of Tokaryovsky District
- Nikolayevka, Poletayevsky Selsoviet, Tokaryovsky District, Tambov Oblast, a village in Poletayevsky Selsoviet of Tokaryovsky District
- Nikolayevka, Znamensky District, Tambov Oblast, a village in Pokrovo-Marfinsky Selsoviet of Znamensky District

== Republic of Tatarstan ==
As of 2010, four rural localities in the Republic of Tatarstan bear this name:

- Nikolayevka, Chistopolsky District, Republic of Tatarstan, a settlement in Chistopolsky District
- Nikolayevka, Menzelinsky District, Republic of Tatarstan, a selo in Menzelinsky District
- Nikolayevka, Nizhnekamsky District, Republic of Tatarstan, a village in Nizhnekamsky District
- Nikolayevka, Rybno-Slobodsky District, Republic of Tatarstan, a village in Rybno-Slobodsky District

== Tomsk Oblast ==
As of 2010, two rural localities in Tomsk Oblast bear this name:

- Nikolayevka, Shegarsky District, Tomsk Oblast, a village in Shegarsky District
- Nikolayevka, Tomsky District, Tomsk Oblast, a village in Tomsky District

== Tula Oblast ==
As of 2010, six rural localities in Tula Oblast bear this name:

- Nikolayevka, Belyovsky District, Tula Oblast, a village in Bobrikovsky Rural Okrug of Belyovsky District
- Nikolayevka, Kimovsky District, Tula Oblast, a village in Korablinsky Rural Okrug of Kimovsky District
- Nikolayevka, Karamyshevskaya Rural Administration, Shchyokinsky District, Tula Oblast, a village in Karamyshevskaya Rural Administration of Shchyokinsky District
- Nikolayevka, Selivanovskaya Rural Administration, Shchyokinsky District, Tula Oblast, a village in Selivanovskaya Rural Administration of Shchyokinsky District
- Nikolayevka, Medvedsky Rural Okrug, Yefremovsky District, Tula Oblast, a village in Medvedsky Rural Okrug of Yefremovsky District
- Nikolayevka, Yaroslavsky Rural Okrug, Yefremovsky District, Tula Oblast, a village in Yaroslavsky Rural Okrug of Yefremovsky District

== Tver Oblast ==
As of 2010, two rural localities in Tver Oblast bear this name:

- Nikolayevka, Kalyazinsky District, Tver Oblast, a village in Starobislovskoye Rural Settlement of Kalyazinsky District
- Nikolayevka, Torzhoksky District, Tver Oblast, a village in Vysokovskoye Rural Settlement of Torzhoksky District

== Tyumen Oblast ==
As of 2010, three rural localities in Tyumen Oblast bear this name:

- Nikolayevka, Aromashevsky District, Tyumen Oblast, a village in Slobodchikovsky Rural Okrug of Aromashevsky District
- Nikolayevka, Ishimsky District, Tyumen Oblast, a village in Shablykinsky Rural Okrug of Ishimsky District
- Nikolayevka, Uporovsky District, Tyumen Oblast, a selo in Chernakovsky Rural Okrug of Uporovsky District

== Udmurt Republic ==
As of 2010, one rural locality in the Udmurt Republic bears this name:

- Nikolayevka, Udmurt Republic, a village in Sepsky Selsoviet of Igrinsky District

== Ulyanovsk Oblast ==
As of 2010, two inhabited localities in Ulyanovsk Oblast bear this name:

- Nikolayevka, Nikolayevsky District, Ulyanovsk Oblast, a work settlement in Nikolayevsky Settlement Okrug of Nikolayevsky District
- Nikolayevka, Bazarnosyzgansky District, Ulyanovsk Oblast, a village in Dolzhnikovsky Rural Okrug of Bazarnosyzgansky District

== Vladimir Oblast ==
As of 2010, three rural localities in Vladimir Oblast bear this name:

- Nikolayevka (Krasnoplamenskoye Rural Settlement), Alexandrovsky District, Vladimir Oblast, a village in Alexandrovsky District; municipally, a part of Krasnoplamenskoye Rural Settlement of that district
- Nikolayevka (Andreyevskoye Rural Settlement), Alexandrovsky District, Vladimir Oblast, a village in Alexandrovsky District; municipally, a part of Andreyevskoye Rural Settlement of that district
- Nikolayevka, Kolchuginsky District, Vladimir Oblast, a village in Kolchuginsky District

== Volgograd Oblast ==
As of 2010, one rural locality in Volgograd Oblast bears this name:

- Nikolayevka, Volgograd Oblast, a khutor in Bolshevistsky Selsoviet of Yelansky District

== Voronezh Oblast ==
As of 2010, six rural localities in Voronezh Oblast bear this name:

- Nikolayevka, Nikolayevskoye Rural Settlement, Anninsky District, Voronezh Oblast, a selo in Nikolayevskoye Rural Settlement of Anninsky District
- Nikolayevka, Novozhiznenskoye Rural Settlement, Anninsky District, Voronezh Oblast, a settlement in Novozhiznenskoye Rural Settlement of Anninsky District
- Nikolayevka, Liskinsky District, Voronezh Oblast, a selo in Petropavlovskoye Rural Settlement of Liskinsky District
- Nikolayevka, Pavlovsky District, Voronezh Oblast, a selo in Kazinskoye Rural Settlement of Pavlovsky District
- Nikolayevka, Ternovsky District, Voronezh Oblast, a selo in Nikolayevskoye Rural Settlement of Ternovsky District
- Nikolayevka, Verkhnekhavsky District, Voronezh Oblast, a settlement in Verkhnemazovskoye Rural Settlement of Verkhnekhavsky District

== Zabaykalsky Krai ==
As of 2010, one rural locality in Zabaykalsky Krai bears this name:

- Nikolayevka, Zabaykalsky Krai, a selo in Alexandrovo-Zavodsky District
