= Nikolayevsky (rural locality) =

Nikolayevsky (Russian: Никола́евский; masculine), Nikolayevskaya (Никола́евская; feminine), or Nikolayevskoye (Никола́евское; neuter) is the name of several rural localities in Russia.

== Astrakhan Oblast ==
As of 2010, one rural locality in Astrakhan Oblast bears this name:

- Nikolayevsky, Astrakhan Oblast, a settlement in Karaulinsky Selsoviet of Kamyzyaksky District

== Belgorod Oblast ==
As of 2010, one rural locality in Belgorod Oblast bears this name:

- Nikolayevsky, Belgorod Oblast, a settlement in Krasnogvardeysky District

== Bryansk Oblast ==
As of 2010, two rural localities in Bryansk Oblast bear this name:

- Nikolayevsky, Brasovsky District, Bryansk Oblast, a settlement in Snytkinsky Selsoviet of Brasovsky District
- Nikolayevsky, Pochepsky District, Bryansk Oblast, a settlement in Baklansky Selsoviet of Pochepsky District

== Republic of Buryatia ==
As of 2010, one rural locality in the Republic of Buryatia bears this name:

- Nikolayevsky, Republic of Buryatia, a settlement in Zavodskoy Selsoviet of Tarbagataysky District

== Chuvash Republic ==
As of 2010, one rural locality in the Chuvash Republic bears this name:

- Nikolayevskoye, Chuvash Republic, a selo in Nikolayevskoye Rural Settlement of Yadrinsky District

== Irkutsk Oblast ==
As of 2010, one rural locality in Irkutsk Oblast bears this name:

- Nikolayevsky, Irkutsk Oblast, an area in Zalarinsky District

== Karachay–Cherkess Republic ==
As of 2010, one rural locality in the Karachay–Cherkess Republic bears this name:

- Nikolayevskoye, Karachay–Cherkess Republic, a selo in Prikubansky District

== Kirov Oblast ==
As of 2010, one rural locality in Kirov Oblast bears this name:

- Nikolayevskoye, Kirov Oblast, a selo in Gostovsky Rural Okrug of Shabalinsky District

== Kostroma Oblast ==
As of 2010, one rural locality in Kostroma Oblast bears this name:

- Nikolayevskoye, Kostroma Oblast, a village in Yekaterinkinskoye Settlement of Kadyysky District

== Leningrad Oblast ==
As of 2010, one rural locality in Leningrad Oblast bears this name:

- Nikolayevskoye, Leningrad Oblast, a village in Osminskoye Settlement Municipal Formation of Luzhsky District

== Mari El Republic ==
As of 2010, one rural locality in the Mari El Republic bears this name:

- Nikolayevsky, Mari El Republic, a vyselok in Shelangersky Rural Okrug of Zvenigovsky District

== Nizhny Novgorod Oblast ==
As of 2010, two rural localities in Nizhny Novgorod Oblast bear this name:

- Nikolayevsky, Nizhny Novgorod Oblast, a pochinok in Tumaninsky Selsoviet of Shakhunsky District
- Nikolayevskoye, Nizhny Novgorod Oblast, a village in Vyazovsky Selsoviet of Tonkinsky District

== Republic of North Ossetia–Alania ==
As of 2010, one rural locality in the Republic of North Ossetia–Alania bears this name:

- Nikolayevskaya, Republic of North Ossetia–Alania, a stanitsa in Nikolayevskoye Rural Settlement of Digorsky District

== Novgorod Oblast ==
As of 2010, two rural localities in Novgorod Oblast bear this name:

- Nikolayevskoye, Maryovsky District, Novgorod Oblast, a village in Molvotitskoye Settlement of Maryovsky District
- Nikolayevskoye, Moshenskoy District, Novgorod Oblast, a village in Orekhovskoye Settlement of Moshenskoy District

== Novosibirsk Oblast ==
As of 2010, one rural locality in Novosibirsk Oblast bears this name:

- Nikolayevsky, Novosibirsk Oblast, a settlement in Kochkovsky District

== Oryol Oblast ==
As of 2010, one rural locality in Oryol Oblast bears this name:

- Nikolayevsky, Oryol Oblast, a settlement in Druzhensky Selsoviet of Dmitrovsky District

== Perm Krai ==
As of 2010, one rural locality in Perm Krai bears this name:

- Nikolayevsky, Perm Krai, a settlement in Chernushinsky District

== Rostov Oblast ==
As of 2010, five rural localities in Rostov Oblast bear this name:

- Nikolayevsky, Kagalnitsky District, Rostov Oblast, a khutor in Kirovskoye Rural Settlement of Kagalnitsky District
- Nikolayevsky, Milyutinsky District, Rostov Oblast, a khutor in Nikolo-Berezovskoye Rural Settlement of Milyutinsky District
- Nikolayevsky, Orlovsky District, Rostov Oblast, a khutor in Proletarskoye Rural Settlement of Orlovsky District
- Nikolayevsky, Zimovnikovsky District, Rostov Oblast, a khutor in Leninskoye Rural Settlement of Zimovnikovsky District
- Nikolayevskaya, Rostov Oblast, a stanitsa in Nikolayevskoye Rural Settlement of Konstantinovsky District

== Ryazan Oblast ==
As of 2010, one rural locality in Ryazan Oblast bears this name:

- Nikolayevskoye, Ryazan Oblast, a selo in Krutoyarsky Rural Okrug of Kasimovsky District

== Smolensk Oblast ==
As of 2010, two rural localities in Smolensk Oblast bear this name:

- Nikolayevskoye, Glinkovsky District, Smolensk Oblast, a village in Glinkovskoye Rural Settlement of Glinkovsky District
- Nikolayevskoye, Roslavlsky District, Smolensk Oblast, a village in Syrokorenskoye Rural Settlement of Roslavlsky District

== Stavropol Krai ==
As of 2010, one rural locality in Stavropol Krai bears this name:

- Nikolayevsky, Stavropol Krai, a khutor in Andropovsky District

== Tambov Oblast ==
As of 2010, one rural locality in Tambov Oblast bears this name:

- Nikolayevsky, Tambov Oblast, a settlement in Alexandrovsky Selsoviet of Rzhaksinsky District

== Tver Oblast ==
As of 2010, three rural localities in Tver Oblast bear this name:

- Nikolayevskoye, Maksatikhinsky District, Tver Oblast, a village in Maksatikhinsky District
- Nikolayevskoye, Toropetsky District, Tver Oblast, a village in Toropetsky District
- Nikolayevskoye, Vyshnevolotsky District, Tver Oblast, a village in Vyshnevolotsky District

== Volgograd Oblast ==
As of 2010, one rural locality in Volgograd Oblast bears this name:

- Nikolayevsky, Volgograd Oblast, a khutor in Verkhnekardailsky Selsoviet of Novonikolayevsky District

== Vologda Oblast ==
As of 2010, one rural locality in Vologda Oblast bears this name:

- Nikolayevskaya, Vologda Oblast, a village in Shevdenitsky Selsoviet of Tarnogsky District

== Yaroslavl Oblast ==
As of 2010, one rural locality in Yaroslavl Oblast bears this name:

- Nikolayevskoye, Yaroslavl Oblast, a village in Markovsky Rural Okrug of Bolsheselsky District

== Zabaykalsky Krai ==
As of 2010, one rural locality in Zabaykalsky Krai bears this name:

- Nikolayevskoye, Zabaykalsky Krai, a selo in Ulyotovsky District
