= Vinogradovka =

Vinogradovka may refer to several rural localities in Russia:

- Vinogradovka, Altai Krai, a selo in Kulundinsky District, Altai Krai
- Vinogradovka, Amur Oblast, a selo in Bureysky District, Amur Oblast
- Vinogradovka, Khabarovsky District, a selo in Khabarovsky District, Khabarovsk Krai

== See also ==
- Vynohradivka, Bashtanka Raion, Mykolaiv Oblast, a place in Ukraine sharing the same etymological name root
