= Sibirsky Gigant =

Sibirsky Gigant Сибирский Гигант
- Settlement
- Location within Altai Krai Location within Russia
- Coordinates: 53°14′N 79°49′E
- Country: Russia
- Region: Altai Krai
- District: Suyetsky District
- Time zone: UTC+7:00

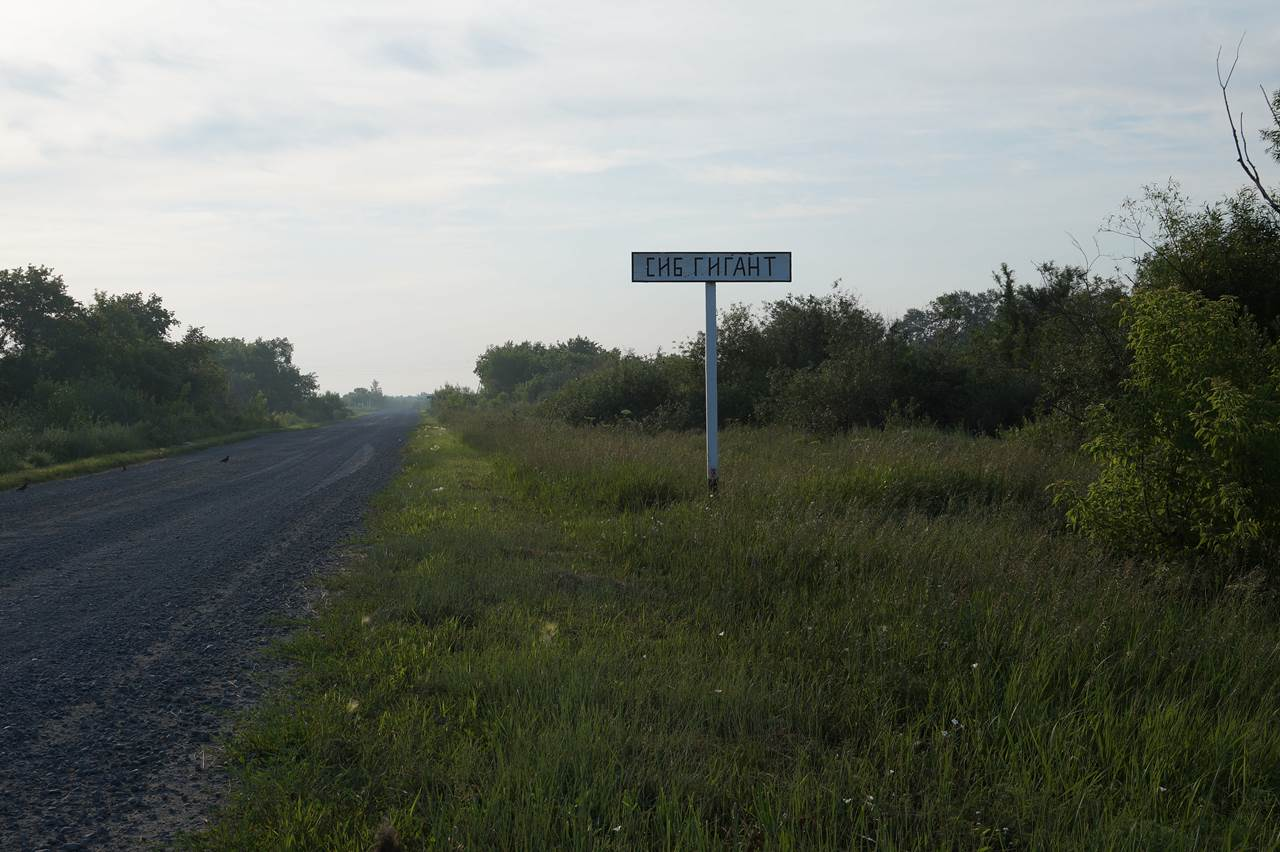
Entry sign on the Slavgorod-Znamenka-Yudikha road marking the beginning of the Siberian Giant settlement

Sibirsky Gigant (Russian: Сибирский Гигант) is a rural locality (a settlement) in Nizhnesuyetsky Selsoviet, Suyetsky District, Altai Krai, Russia. The population was 144 as of 2013. There are 5 streets.

== Geography ==
Sibirsky Gigant is located 20 km southwest of Verkh-Suyetka (the district's administrative centre) by road. Nizhnyaya Suyetka is the nearest rural locality.
