= Nikolayevsky District =

Nikolayevsky District may refer to:

- Nikolayevsky District, Russia, name of several districts in Russia
- Mykolaiv Raion, Lviv Oblast, a former district of Lviv Oblast, Ukraine
- Mykolaiv Raion, Mykolaiv Oblast, a district of Mykolaiv Oblast, Ukraine
- Mykolaivka Raion, a district of Odesa Oblast, Ukraine

== See also ==
- Nikolayevsky (disambiguation)
- Nikolayevsk (disambiguation)
- Nikolayev (disambiguation)
