= Nikolayevskoye Urban Settlement =

Nikolayevskoye Urban Settlement is the name of several municipal formations in Russia.

- Nikolayevskoye Urban Settlement, a municipal formation which the settlement of Nikolayevka and two rural localities in Smidovichsky District of the Jewish Autonomous Oblast are incorporated as
- Nikolayevskoye Urban Settlement, a municipal formation which Nikolayevsky Settlement Okrug in Nikolayevsky District of Ulyanovsk Oblast is incorporated as

== See also ==
- Nikolayevsky
