= Staraya Raychikha =

Staraya Raychikha Старая Райчиха
- Selo
- Location within Amur Oblast Location within Russia
- Coordinates: 49°45′N 129°13′E
- Country: Russia
- Region: Amur Oblast
- District: Bureysky District
- Time zone: UTC+9:00

Staraya Raychikha (Russian: Старая Райчиха) is a rural locality (a selo) in Staroraychikhinsky Selsoviet of Bureysky District, Amur Oblast, Russia. The population was 324 as of 2018. There are 7 streets.

== Geography ==
Staraya Raychikha is located on the right bank of the Raychikha River, 58 km west of Novobureysky (the district's administrative centre) by road. Uspenovka is the nearest rural locality.
