= Sovetsky Put =

Sovetsky Put Советский Путь
- Selo
- Location within Altai Krai Location within Russia
- Coordinates: 51°07′N 81°16′E
- Country: Russia
- Region: Altai Krai
- District: Loktevsky District
- Time zone: UTC+7:00

Sovetsky Put (Russian: Советский Путь) is a rural locality (a selo) and the administrative center of Novomikhaylovsky Selsoviet, Loktevsky District, Altai Krai, Russia. The population was 652 as of 2013. There are 7 streets.

== Geography ==
Sovetsky Put is located 26 km northwest of Gornyak (the district's administrative centre) by road. Removsky is the nearest rural locality.
