= Removsky =

Removsky Ремовский
- Settlement
- Location within Altai Krai Location within Russia
- Coordinates: 51°07′N 81°13′E
- Country: Russia
- Region: Altai Krai
- District: Loktevsky District
- Time zone: UTC+7:00

Removsky (Russian: Ремовский) is a rural locality (a settlement) and the administrative center of Removsky Selsoviet of Loktevsky District, Altai Krai, Russia. The population was 864 as of 2016. There are 9 streets.

== Geography ==
Removsky is located 25 km northwest of Gornyak (the district's administrative centre) by road. Novomikhaylovka is the nearest rural locality.
