= Novenkoye =

Novenkoyeeew Новенькоеwwwwwww
- Village
- Location within Altai Krai Location within Russia
- Coordinates: 51°02′N 81°08′E
- Country: Russia
- Region: Altai Krai
- District: Loktevsky District
- Time zone: UTC+7:00

Novenkoye (Russian: Новенькое) is a rural locality (a selo) and the administrative center of Novonensky Selsoviet of Loktevsky District, Altai Krai, Russia. The population was 412 as of 2016. There are 10 streets.

== Geography ==
Novenkoye is located 39 km northwest of Gornyak (the district's administrative centre) by road. Novomikhaylovka is the nearest rural locality.
