= Boronsky =

Boronsky Боронский
- Settlement
- Location within Altai Krai Location within Russia
- Coordinates: 53°10′N 80°05′E
- Country: Russia
- Region: Altai Krai
- District: Suyetsky District
- Time zone: UTC+7:00

Boronsky (Russian: Боронский) is a rural locality (a settlement) and the administrative center of Boronsky Selsoviet, Suyetsky District, Altai Krai, Russia. The population was 220 as of 2013. There are 4 streets.

== Geography ==
Boronsky is located 26 km south of Verkh-Suyetka (the district's administrative centre) by road. Mikhaylovka is the nearest rural locality.
