= Ukrainsky =

Ukrainsky Украинский
- Settlement
- Location within Altai Krai Location within Russia
- Coordinates: 53°13′N 80°09′E
- Country: Russia
- Region: Altai Krai
- District: Suyetsky District
- Time zone: UTC+7:00

Ukrainsky (Russian: Украинский) is a rural locality (a settlement) in Aleksandrovsky Selsoviet, Suyetsky District, Altai Krai, Russia. The population was 151 as of 2013. There are 3 streets.

== Geography ==
Ukrainsky is located 13 km southeast of Verkh-Suyetka (the district's administrative centre) by road. Aleksandrovka is the nearest rural locality.
