= Gilyovo =

Gilyovo Гилёво
- Village
- Location within Altai Krai Location within Russia
- Coordinates: 51°08′N 81°47′E
- Country: Russia
- Region: Altai Krai
- District: Loktevsky District
- Time zone: UTC+7:00

Gilyovo (Russian: Гилёво) is a rural locality (a selo) and the administrative center of Gilyovsky Selsoviet of Loktevsky District, Altai Krai, Russia. The population was 935 as of 2016. There are 13 streets.

== Geography ==
It is located on the Aley River, 41 km northeast of Gornyak (the district's administrative centre) by road. Mezhdurechye is the nearest rural locality.
