= Doldykan =

Doldykan Долдыкан
- Selo
- Location within Amur Oblast Location within Russia
- Coordinates: 49°53′49″N 129°52′41″E
- Country: Russia
- Region: Amur Oblast
- District: Bureysky District
- Time zone: UTC+9:00

Doldykan (Russian: Долдыкан) is a rural locality (a selo) in Doldykansky Selsoviet of Bureysky District, Amur Oblast, Russia. The population was 369 as of 2018. There are 7 streets.

== Geography ==
Doldykan is located on the R297 highway, 15 km north of Novobureysky (the district's administrative centre) by road. Novobureysky is the nearest rural locality.
