= Posyolok imeni Vladimira Ilyicha =

Posyolok imeni Vladimira Ilyicha Посёлок имени Владимира Ильича
- Settlement
- Location within Altai Krai Location within Russia
- Coordinates: 53°14′N 79°42′E
- Country: Russia
- Region: Altai Krai
- District: Suyetsky District
- Time zone: UTC+7:00

Posyolok imeni Vladimira Ilyicha (Russian: Посёлок имени Владимира Ильича) is a rural locality (a settlement) in Nizhesuetsky Selsoviet of Suyetsky District, Altai Krai, Russia. The population was 128 in 2016. There are 4 streets.

== Geography ==
Posyolok imeni Vladimira Ilyicha is located 32 km southwest of Verkh-Suyetka (the district's administrative centre) by road. Sibirsky Gigant is the nearest rural locality.
