= Masalsky =

Masalsky Масальский
- Settlement
- Location within Altai Krai Location within Russia
- Coordinates: 50°57′N 81°47′E
- Country: Russia
- Region: Altai Krai
- District: Loktevsky District
- Time zone: UTC+7:00

Masalsky (Russian: Масальский) is a rural locality (a settlement) in and the administrative center of Masalsky Selsoviet, Loktevsky District, Altai Krai, Russia. The population was 1,669 as of 2013. There are 22 streets.

== Geography ==
Masalsky is located 30 km east of Gornyak (the district's administrative centre) by road. Stepnoy is the nearest rural locality.
