= Bezozyornoye =

Bezozyornoye Безозёрное
- Selo
- Location within Amur Oblast Location within Russia
- Coordinates: 49°48′N 129°01′E
- Country: Russia
- Region: Amur Oblast
- District: Bureysky District
- Time zone: UTC+9:00

Bezozyornoye (Russian: Безозёрное) is a rural locality (a selo) and the administrative center of Raychikhinsky Selsoviet of Bureysky District, Amur Oblast, Russia. The population was 409 as of 2018. There are 17 streets.

== Geography ==
Bezozyornoye is located on the right bank of the Kupriyanikha River, 74 km west of Novobureysky (the district's administrative centre) by road. Voskresenovka is the nearest rural locality.
