= Dobrovolsky, Altai Krai =

Dobrovolsky Добровольский
- Settlement
- Location within Altai Krai Location within Russia
- Coordinates: 53°12′N 80°09′E
- Country: Russia
- Region: Altai Krai
- District: Suyetsky District
- Time zone: UTC+7:00

Dobrovolsky (Russian: Добровольский) is a rural locality (a settlement) in Aleksandrovsky Selsoviet, Suyetsky District, Altai Krai, Russia. The population was 10 as of 2013. There is 1 street.

== Geography ==
Dobrovolsky is located 19 km southeast of Verkh-Suyetka (the district's administrative centre) by road. Aleksandrovka and Ukrainsky are the nearest rural localities.
