= Nikolayevka =

Nikolayevka may refer to:

- Amrakits or Nikolayevka, Armenia
- Jraber or Nikolayevka, Armenia
- Dzerjinovka or Nikolayevka, Azerbaijan
- Nikolaevka, Bulgaria, a village in Suvorovo Municipality, Bulgaria
- Nikolayevka, Russia, name of several inhabited localities in Russia
- Mykolaivka, name similar in meaning of several populated places in Ukraine

== See also ==
- Nikolayevsk (disambiguation)
- Nikolayev (disambiguation)
- Nikolayevsky (disambiguation)
