= Nikolayevsky =

Nikolayevsky (masculine), Nikolayevskaya (feminine), or Nikolayevskoye (neuter) may refer to:

- Yuri Nikolaevsky (1937–2004), Soviet/Ukrainian chess player
- Mykolaiv Oblast (Nikolayevskaya oblast), an oblast of Ukraine
- Nikolayevsky District (disambiguation), several districts in the countries of the former Soviet Union
- Nikolayevskoye Urban Settlement, several municipal urban settlements in Russia
- Nikolayevsky (rural locality) (Nikolayevskaya, Nikolayevskoye), several rural localities in Russia
- Nikolayevsky Rail Terminal (disambiguation), several rail terminals in Russia

== See also ==
- Nikolayevsk (disambiguation)
- Nikolayev (disambiguation)
- Nikolayevka (disambiguation)
