= Zolotukha, Altai Krai =

Zolotukha Золотуха
- Selo
- Location within Altai Krai Location within Russia
- Coordinates: 50°48′N 81°31′E
- Country: Russia
- Region: Altai Krai
- District: Loktevsky District
- Time zone: UTC+7:00

Zolotukha (Russian: Золотуха) is a rural locality (a selo) and the administrative center of Zolotukhinsky Selsoviet, Loktevsky District, Altai Krai, Russia. The population was 902 as of 2013. There are 6 streets.

== Geography ==
Zolotukha is located 25 km south of Gornyak (the district's administrative centre) by road. Burkotovo is the nearest rural locality.
