= Nikolayevka, Bureysky District, Amur Oblast =

Nikolayevka Николаевка
- Selo
- Location within Amur Oblast Location within Russia
- Coordinates: 49°47′N 129°54′E
- Country: Russia
- Region: Amur Oblast
- District: Bureysky District
- Time zone: UTC+9:00

Nikolayevka (Russian: Николаевка) is a rural locality (a selo) in Rabochy posyolok Novobureysky of Bureysky District, Amur Oblast, Russia. The population was 808 as of 2018. There are 11 streets.

== Geography ==
Nikolayevka is located 4 km east of Novobureysky (the district's administrative centre) by road. Novobureysky is the nearest rural locality.
