= Nizhnyaya Suyetka =

Nizhnyaya Suyetka Нижняя Суетка
- Selo
- Location within Altai Krai Location within Russia
- Coordinates: 53°13′N 79°53′E
- Country: Russia
- Region: Altai Krai
- District: Suyetsky District
- Time zone: UTC+7:00

Nizhnyaya Suyetka (Russian: Нижняя Суетка) is a rural locality (a selo) and the administrative center of Nizhnesuyetsky Selsoviet, Suyetsky District, Altai Krai, Russia. The population was 907 as of 2013. There are 16 streets.

== Geography ==
Nizhnyaya Suyetka is located 14 km southwest of Verkh-Suyetka (the district's administrative centre) by road. Sibirsky Gigant is the nearest rural locality.
