= Nikolayevka, Loktevsky District, Altai Krai =

Nikolayevka Николаевка
- Village
- Location within Altai Krai Location within Russia
- Coordinates: 51°04′N 81°24′E
- Country: Russia
- Region: Altai Krai
- District: Loktevsky District
- Time zone: UTC+7:00

Nikolayevka (Russian: Николаевка) is a rural locality (a selo) and the administrative center of Nikolayevsky Selsoviet of Loktevsky District, Altai Krai, Russia. The population was 458 as of 2016. There are 10 streets.

== Geography ==
Nikolayevka is located 14 km north of Gornyak (the district's administrative centre) by road. Gornyak is the nearest rural locality.
