= Nikolayevsky District, Russia =

Location of Khabarovsk Krai in Russia

Location of Ulyanovsk Oblast in Russia

Location of Volgograd Oblast in Russia

Nikolayevsky District is the name of several administrative and municipal districts in Russia. The districts' name generally comes from the first name Nikolay.

- Nikolayevsky District, Khabarovsk Krai, an administrative and municipal district of Khabarovsk Krai
- Nikolayevsky District, Ulyanovsk Oblast, an administrative and municipal district of Ulyanovsk Oblast
- Nikolayevsky District, Volgograd Oblast, an administrative and municipal district of Volgograd Oblast

== See also ==
- Nikolayevsky (disambiguation)
