= Vinogradovka, Amur Oblast =

Vinogradovka Виноградовка
- Selo
- Location within Amur Oblast Location within Russia
- Coordinates: 49°39′N 129°24′E
- Country: Russia
- Region: Amur Oblast
- District: Bureysky District
- Time zone: UTC+9:00

Vinogradovka (Russian: Виноградовка) is a rural locality (a selo) in Vinogradovsky Selsoviet of Bureysky District, Amur Oblast, Russia. The population was 438 as of 2018. There are 7 streets.

== Geography ==
Vinogradovka is located 52 km southwest of Novobureysky (the district's administrative centre) by road. Zelvino is the nearest rural locality.
