= Nikolayevka, Suyetsky District, Altai Krai =

Nikolayevka Николаевка
- Settlement
- Location within Altai Krai Location within Russia
- Coordinates: 53°11′N 80°05′E
- Country: Russia
- Region: Altai Krai
- District: Suyetsky District
- Time zone: UTC+7:00

Nikolayevka (Russian: Николаевка) is a rural locality (a settlement) in Boronsky Selsoviet, Suyetsky District, Altai Krai, Russia. The population was 27 as of 2013. There is 1 street.

== Geography ==
Nikolayevka is located 25 km south of Verkh-Suyetka (the district's administrative centre) by road. Boronsky is the nearest rural locality.
