= Mykolaiv Raion (disambiguation) =

Mykolaiv Raion (Ukrainian: Миколаївський район, "Mykolaiv District") may refer to:

- Mykolaiv Raion, Lviv Oblast, abolished raion in western Ukraine
- Mykolaiv Raion, Mykolaiv Oblast, southern Ukraine
- Vitovka Raion, known as Mykolaiv Raion between 1939 and 1944, southern Ukraine.

== See also ==
- Mykolaiv (disambiguation)
