= Mykolaiv (disambiguation) =

Mykolaiv is a city and shipbuilding port in southern Ukraine, in the eponymous raion and oblast

Mykolaiv or Mykolayiv can also refer to:

== Places ==
- Mykolaiv Raion, Mykolaiv Oblast, Ukraine; containing the eponymous city
- Mykolaiv Oblast, Ukraine; containing the eponymous raion and city
- Mykolaiv, Lviv Oblast, a small city (town) in western Ukraine, administrative center of the Mykolaiv Raion in the Lviv Oblast
- Mykolaiv Raion, Lviv Oblast, Ukraine; a former raion district
- Mykolaiv, Radekhiv Raion, a village in the Lviv Oblast of western Ukraine
- Mykolaiv, Pustomyty Raion, a village in the Lviv Oblast of western Ukraine
- Mykolaiv, Khmelnytskyi Raion, a village in the Khmelnytskyi Oblast of western Ukraine
- Vitovka Raion, Ukraine; formerly known as Mykolaiv Raion (1939-1944)

=== Facilities and structures ===
- Mykolaiv Airport, Mykolaiv, Mykolaiv Raion, Mykolaiv Oblast, Ukraine
- Mykolaiv Observatory, Mykolaiv, Mykolaiv Raion, Mykolaiv Oblast, Ukraine; an astronomical observatory

== Sports ==
- MBC Mykolaiv, a basketball team in Mykolaiv, Mykolaiv Raion, Mykolaiv Oblast, Ukraine
- MFC Mykolaiv, a soccer team in Mykolaiv, Mykolaiv Raion, Mykolaiv Oblast, Ukraine
- MFC Mykolaiv-2, a soccer team in Mykolaiv, Mykolaiv, Mykolaiv, Ukraine
- FC Mykolaiv, a soccer team in Mykolaiv, Stryi Raion, Lvivska Oblast, Ukraine

== Other uses ==
- Battle of Mykolaiv (2022), during the Russian invasion of Ukraine
- Ukrainian frigate Mykolaiv, a former Soviet and then Ukrainian Navy guard ship
- Mykolaiv Regional Committee of the Communist Party of Ukraine, USSR

== See also ==
- Mykolaiv Raion (disambiguation)
- Mykolaiv Shipyard (disambiguation)
- Mykolaiv offensive (2022), during the Russian invasion of Ukraine
- Mykolayiv State Agrarian University, Mykolaiv, Mykolaiv, Mykolaiv, Ukraine
- Mikołajów (disambiguation)
- Nikolayev (disambiguation)
