= Nikolayevka, Blagoveshchensky District, Republic of Bashkortostan =

Nikolayevka Николаевка
- Selo
- Location within Bashkortostan Location within Russia
- Coordinates: 55°05′N 55°51′E
- Country: Russia
- Region: Bashkortostan
- District: Blagoveshchensky District

Population (2010)
  - Total: 668
- Time zone: UTC+5:00
- Postal code: 453441

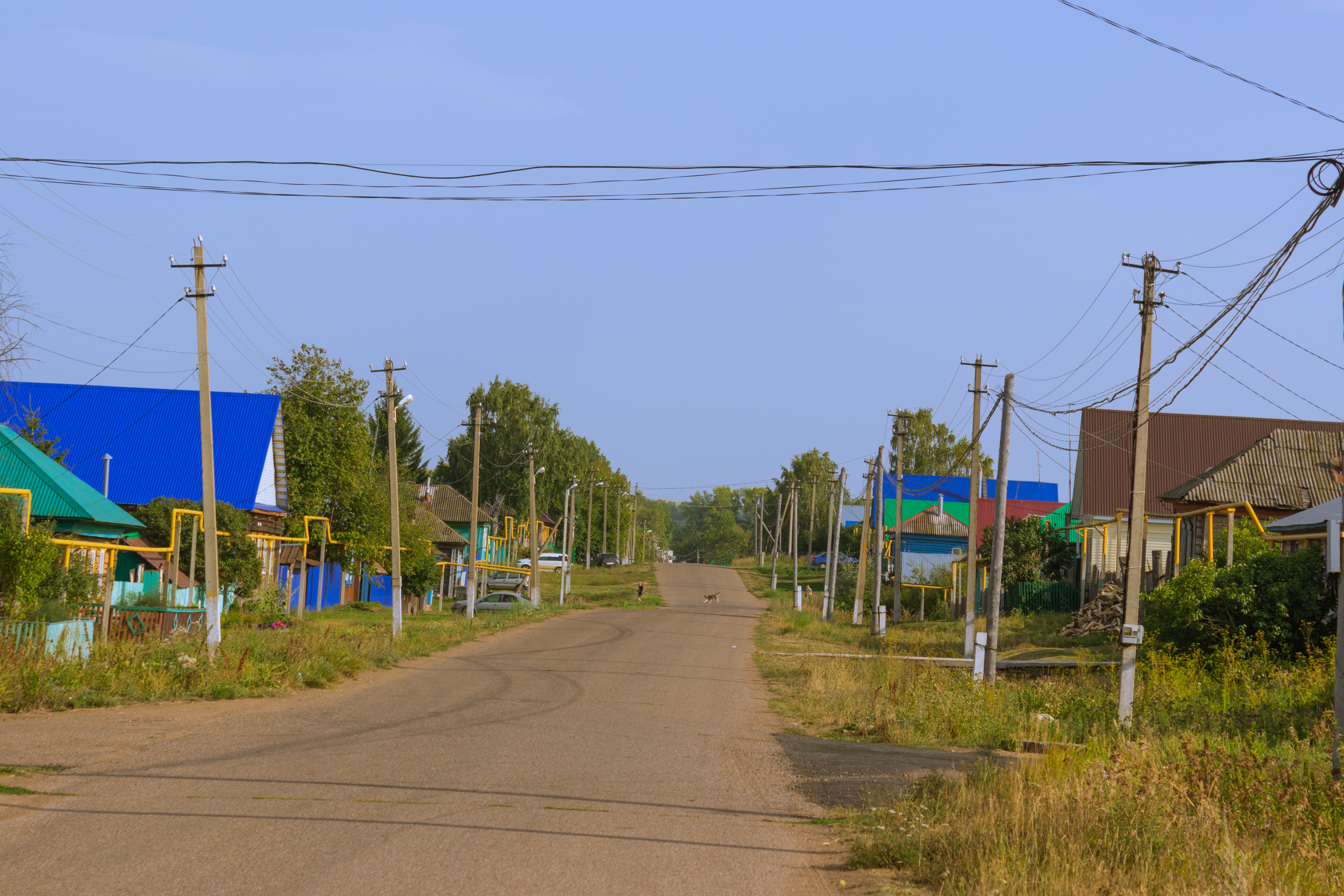
Nikolayevka

Nikolayevka (Russian: Николаевка) is a rural locality (a selo) and the administrative centre of Nikolayevsky Selsoviet, Blagoveshchensky District, Bashkortostan, Russia. The population was 668 as of 2010. There are 2 streets.

== Geography ==
Nikolayevka is located 9 km northwest of Blagoveshchensk (the district's administrative centre) by road. Dmitriyevka is the nearest rural locality.
