= Mikołajów =

Mikołajów may refer to the following places:

- Mikołajów, Lower Silesian Voivodeship (south-west Poland)
- Mikołajów, Piotrków County in Łódź Voivodeship (central Poland)
- Mikołajów, Gmina Rokiciny, Tomaszów County in Łódź Voivodeship (central Poland)
- Mikołajów, Kazimierza County in Świętokrzyskie Voivodeship (south-central Poland)
- Mikołajów, Staszów County in Świętokrzyskie Voivodeship (south-central Poland)

== See also ==
- Mykolaiv (disambiguation), the name of several towns in Ukraine, called Mikołajów in Polish
