= Cabanı =

- Location within Azerbaijan
- Coordinates: 40°39′47″N 48°41′53″E
- Country: Azerbaijan
- Rayon: Shamakhi
- Municipality: İkinci Cabanı
- Time zone: UTC+4 (AZT)
  - Summer (DST): UTC+5 (AZT)

Cabanı (also, Dzhabany) is a village in the Shamakhi Rayon of Azerbaijan. The village forms part of the municipality of İkinci Cabanı.

This was the site of a crucial battle of 1500AD when some 7,000 Qizilbash forces, consisting of the Ustaclu, Shamlu, Rumlu, Tekelu, Zhulkadir, Afshar, Qajar and Varsak tribes, responded to the invitation of Ismail I and marched against the Shirvanshah ruler Farrukh Yassar, setting in motion the eventual establishment of the Safavid state
