= Mykolaiv Shipyard =

Mykolaiv Shipyard may refer to various shipyards in the Ukrainian city of Mykolaiv or Nikolayev:

- Black Sea Shipyard, also known as Nikolayev South Shipyard, Soviet Shipyard No. 444 and Shipyard No. 198
- Mykolayiv Shipyard, also known as Nikolaev North Shipyard and Soviet Shipyard No. 200
- Okean Shipyard, a merchant shipyard
- Nibulon Shipbuilding-Shiprepair Plant, operated by the Nibulon agro-logistics company

== See also ==
- Mykolayiv (disambiguation)
