= Nikolayevka, Miyakinsky District, Republic of Bashkortostan =

Nikolayevka Николаевка
- Village
- Location within Bashkortostan Location within Russia
- Coordinates: 53°42′N 55°05′E
- Country: Russia
- Region: Bashkortostan
- District: Miyakinsky District
- Time zone: UTC+5:00

Nikolayevka (Russian: Николаевка) is a rural locality (a village) in Miyakibashevsky Selsoviet, Miyakinsky District, Bashkortostan, Russia. The population was 13 as of 2010. There is 1 street.

== Geography ==
Nikolayevka is located 25 km northeast of Kirgiz-Miyaki (the district's administrative centre) by road. Maximovka is the nearest rural locality.
