= İkinci Cabanı =

- Village
- Location within Azerbaijan
- Coordinates: 40°40′N 48°42′E
- Country: Azerbaijan
- Rayon: Shamakhi
- Time zone: UTC+4 (AZT)
  - Summer (DST): UTC+5 (AZT)

İkinci Cabanı (known as Nikolayevka and Dzerjinovka until 1999) is a village and municipality in the Shamakhi Rayon of Azerbaijan. It has a population of 834. The municipality consists of the villages of İkinci Cabanı and Cabanı.
