= Nikolayevka, Volgograd Oblast =

Nikolayevka Николаевка
- Khutor
- Location within Volgograd Oblast Location within Russia
- Coordinates: 50°40′N 43°40′E
- Country: Russia
- Region: Volgograd Oblast
- District: Yelansky District
- Time zone: UTC+4:00

Nikolayevka (Russian: Николаевка) is a rural locality (a khutor) in Bolshevistskoye Rural Settlement, Yelansky District, Volgograd Oblast, Russia. The population was 220 as of 2010.

== Geography ==
Nikolayevka is located on Khopyorsko-Buzulukskaya Plain, on the left bank of the Buzuluk River, 62 km south of Yelan (the district's administrative centre) by road. Bolshevik is the nearest rural locality.
