= Nikolayevka, Alsheyevsky District, Republic of Bashkortostan =

Nikolayevka Николаевка
- Selo
- Location within Bashkortostan Location within Russia
- Coordinates: 53°58′N 55°16′E
- Country: Russia
- Region: Bashkortostan
- District: Alsheyevsky District
- Time zone: UTC+5:00

Nikolayevka (Russian: Николаевка) is a rural locality (a selo) in Abdrashitovsky Selsoviet, Alsheyevsky District, Bashkortostan, Russia. The population was 2 as of 2010. There is 1 street.

== Geography ==
Nikolayevka is located 36 km southeast of Rayevsky (the district's administrative centre) by road. Balkan is the nearest rural locality.
