= Nikolayevsky, Astrakhan Oblast =

Nikolayevsky Николаевский
- Settlement
- Location within Astrakhan Oblast Location within Russia
- Coordinates: 45°54′N 48°08′E
- Country: Russia
- Region: Astrakhan Oblast
- District: Kamyzyaksky District
- Time zone: UTC+4:00

Nikolayevsky (Russian: Николаевский) is a rural locality (a settlement) in Karaulinsky Selsoviet, Kamyzyaksky District, Astrakhan Oblast, Russia. The population was 107 as of 2010. There is 1 street.

== Geography ==
Nikolayevsky is located 27 km south of Kamyzyak (the district's administrative centre) by road. Zaton is the nearest rural locality.
