= Nikolayevka, Nikolayevskoye Rural Settlement, Anninsky District, Voronezh Oblast =

Nikolayevka Николаевка
- Selo
- Location within Voronezh Oblast Location within Russia
- Coordinates: 51°31′N 40°16′E
- Country: Russia
- Region: Voronezh Oblast
- District: Anninsky District
- Time zone: UTC+3:00

Nikolayevka (Russian: Николаевка) is a rural locality (a selo) and the administrative center of Nikolayevskoye Rural Settlement, Anninsky District, Voronezh Oblast, Russia. The population was 1,188 as of 2010. There are 9 streets.

== Geography ==
Nikolayevka is located 12 km northwest of Anna (the district's administrative centre) by road. Sofyinka is the nearest rural locality.
