= Nikolayevka, Birsky District, Republic of Bashkortostan =

Nikolayevka Николаевка
- Selo
- Location within Bashkortostan Location within Russia
- Coordinates: 55°23′N 55°36′E
- Country: Russia
- Region: Bashkortostan
- District: Birsky District
- Time zone: UTC+5:00

Nikolayevka (Russian: Николаевка) is a rural locality (a selo) in Burnovsky Selsoviet, Birsky District, Bashkortostan, Russia. The population was 505 as of 2010. There are 7 streets.

== Geography ==
Nikolayevka is located 9 km southeast of Birsk (the district's administrative centre) by road. Birsk is the nearest rural locality.
