= Nikolayevsky, Volgograd Oblast =

Nikolayevsky Николаевский
- Khutor
- Location within Volgograd Oblast Location within Russia
- Coordinates: 51°08′N 42°40′E
- Country: Russia
- Region: Volgograd Oblast
- District: Novonikolayevsky District
- Time zone: UTC+4:00

Nikolayevsky (Russian: Николаевский) is a rural locality (a khutor) in Verkhnekardailskoye Rural Settlement, Novonikolayevsky District, Volgograd Oblast, Russia. The population was 154 as of 2010. There are 7 streets.

== Geography ==
Nikolayevsky is located in steppe, on the Khopyorsko-Buzulukskaya Plain, on the bank of the Kardail River, 38 km northeast of Novonikolayevsky (the district's administrative centre) by road. Verkhnekardailsky is the nearest rural locality.
