= Nikolayevka, Tabunsky District, Altai Krai =

Nikolayevka Николаевка
- Selo
- Location within Altai Krai Location within Russia
- Coordinates: 52°56′N 79°07′E
- Country: Russia
- Region: Altai Krai
- District: Tabunsky District
- Time zone: UTC+7:00

Nikolayevka (Russian: Николаевка) is a rural locality (a selo) in Serebropolsky Selsoviet, Tabunsky District, Altai Krai, Russia. The population was 182 as of 2013. There are 2 streets.

== Geography ==
Nikolayevka lies in the Kulunda Steppe, 7 kilometers (4.3 mi) to the south of lake Maloye Yarovoye and 10 kilometers (6.2 mi) to the ESE of lake Belenkoye. It is located 38 km northeast of Tabuny (the district's administrative centre) by road. Khorosheye is the nearest rural locality.
