= Vinogradovka, Altai Krai =

Vinogradovka Виноградовка
- Selo
- Location within Altai Krai Location within Russia
- Coordinates: 52°27′N 79°05′E
- Country: Russia
- Region: Altai Krai
- District: Kulundinsky District
- Time zone: UTC+7:00

Vinogradovka (Russian: Виноградовка) is a rural locality (a selo) in Kursky Selsoviet, Kulundinsky District, Altai Krai, Russia. The population was 236 in 2013. There are three streets.

== Geography ==
Vinogradovka is located 20 km southeast of Kulunda (the district's administrative centre) by road. Mirny is the nearest rural locality.
