= Nikolayevka, Pospelikhinsky District, Altai Krai =

Nikolayevka Николаевка
- Selo
- Location within Altai Krai Location within Russia
- Coordinates: 51°52′N 82°03′E
- Country: Russia
- Region: Altai Krai
- District: Pospelikhinsky District
- Time zone: UTC+7:00

Nikolayevka (Russian: Николаевка) is a rural locality (a selo) and the administrative center of Nikolayevsky Selsoviet, Pospelikhinsky District, Altai Krai, Russia. The population was 1,336 as of 2013. There are 12 streets.

== Geography ==
Nikolayevka is located 21 km southeast of Pospelikha (the district's administrative centre) by road. Gavrilovsky is the nearest rural locality.
