= Nikolayevka (selo), Alexeyevsky District, Belgorod Oblast =

Nikolayevka Николаевка
- Selo
- Location within Belgorod Oblast Location within Russia
- Coordinates: 50°21′N 38°53′E
- Country: Russia
- Region: Belgorod Oblast
- District: Alexeyevsky District
- Time zone: UTC+3:00

Nikolayevka (Russian: Николаевка) is a rural locality (a selo) in Alexeyevsky District, Belgorod Oblast, Russia. The population was 119 as of 2010. There is 1 street.
