= Nikolayevskoye, Zabaykalsky Krai =

Nikolayevskoye Николаевское
- Selo
- Location within Zabaykalsky Krai Location within Russia
- Coordinates: 51°03′N 111°46′E
- Country: Russia
- Region: Zabaykalsky Krai
- District: Ulyotovsky District
- Time zone: UTC+9:00

Nikolayevskoye (Russian: Николаевское) is a rural locality (a selo) in Ulyotovsky District, Zabaykalsky Krai, Russia. Population: 1,138 (2021 census); 1,282 (2010 census); There are 11 streets in this selo.

== Geography ==
This rural locality is located 60 km from Ulyoty (the district's administrative centre), 163 km from Chita (capital of Zabaykalsky Krai) and 5,210 km from Moscow. Starye Klyuchi is the nearest rural locality.
