= Nikolayevka, Tuymazinsky District, Republic of Bashkortostan =

Nikolayevka Николаевка
- Selo
- Location within Bashkortostan Location within Russia
- Coordinates: 54°26′N 53°58′E
- Country: Russia
- Region: Bashkortostan
- District: Tuymazinsky District
- Time zone: UTC+5:00

Nikolayevka (Russian: Николаевка) is a rural locality (a selo) and the administrative centre of Nikolayevsky Selsoviet, Tuymazinsky District, Bashkortostan, Russia. The population was 724 as of 2010. There are 10 streets.

== Geography ==
Nikolayevka is located 28 km southeast of Tuymazy (the district's administrative centre) by road. Aytaktamak is the nearest rural locality.
