= Nikolayevka, Chekmagushevsky District, Republic of Bashkortostan =

Nikolayevka Николаевка
- Village
- Location within Bashkortostan Location within Russia
- Coordinates: 55°07′N 54°31′E
- Country: Russia
- Region: Bashkortostan
- District: Chekmagushevsky District
- Time zone: UTC+5:00

Nikolayevka (Russian: Николаевка) is a rural locality (a village) in Chekmagushevsky District, Bashkortostan, Russia. The population was 59 as of 2010. There are 2 streets.

== Geography ==
Nikolayevka is located 10 km west of Chekmagush (the district's administrative centre) by road. Tukayevo is the nearest rural locality.
