= Nikolayevka, Narimanovsky District, Astrakhan Oblast =

Nikolayevka Николаевка
- Selo
- Location within Astrakhan Oblast Location within Russia
- Coordinates: 46°19′N 47°43′E
- Country: Russia
- Region: Astrakhan Oblast
- District: Narimanovsky District
- Time zone: UTC+4:00

Nikolayevka (Russian: Николаевка) is a rural locality (a selo) and the administrative center of Nikolayevsky Selsoviet, Narimanovsky District, Astrakhan Oblast, Russia. The population was 1,598 as of 2010. There are 6 streets.

== Geography ==
Nikolayevka is located 56 km southwest of Narimanov (the district's administrative centre) by road. Polynny and Razyezd-2 are the nearest rural localities.
