= Nikolayevka, Veydelevsky District, Belgorod Oblast =

Nikolayevka Николаевка
- Selo
- Location within Belgorod Oblast Location within Russia
- Coordinates: 50°12′N 38°43′E
- Country: Russia
- Region: Belgorod Oblast
- District: Veydelevsky District
- Time zone: UTC+3:00

Nikolayevka (Russian: Николаевка) is a rural locality (a selo) and the administrative center of Nikolayevskoye Rural Settlement, Veydelevsky District, Belgorod Oblast, Russia. The population was 1,000 as of 2010. There are 21 streets.

== Geography ==
Nikolayevka is located 30 km northeast of Veydelevka (the district's administrative centre) by road. Nogin is the nearest rural locality.
