= Nikolayevka, Burayevsky District, Republic of Bashkortostan =

Nikolayevka Николаевка
- Village
- Location within Bashkortostan Location within Russia
- Coordinates: 56°00′N 55°34′E
- Country: Russia
- Region: Bashkortostan
- District: Burayevsky District
- Time zone: UTC+5:00

Nikolayevka (Russian: Николаевка) is a rural locality (a village) in Teplyakovsky Selsoviet, Burayevsky District, Bashkortostan, Russia. The population was 4 as of 2010. There is 1 street.

== Geography ==
Nikolayevka is located 26 km northeast of Burayevo (the district's administrative centre) by road. Arnyashevo is the nearest rural locality.
