= Nikolayevskaya, Vologda Oblast =

Nikolayevskaya Николаевская
- Village
- Location within Vologda Oblast Location within Russia
- Coordinates: 60°29′N 43°33′E
- Country: Russia
- Region: Vologda Oblast
- District: Tarnogsky District
- Time zone: UTC+3:00

Nikolayevskaya (Russian: Николаевская) is a rural locality (a village) in Tarnogskoye Rural Settlement, Tarnogsky District, Vologda Oblast, Russia. The population was 111 as of 2002. There are five streets.

== Geography ==
Nikolayevskaya is located 3 km southwest of Tarnogsky Gorodok (the district's administrative centre) by road. Tarnogsky Gorodok is the nearest rural locality.
