= Nikolayevka, Liskinsky District, Voronezh Oblast =

Nikolayevka Николаевка
- Selo
- Location within Voronezh Oblast Location within Russia
- Coordinates: 50°54′N 39°48′E
- Country: Russia
- Region: Voronezh Oblast
- District: Liskinsky District
- Time zone: UTC+3:00

Nikolayevka (Russian: Николаевка) is a rural locality (a selo) in Petropavlovskoye Rural Settlement, Liskinsky District, Voronezh Oblast, Russia. The population was 80 as of 2010. There are 2 streets.

== Geography ==
Nikolayevka is located 38 km southeast of Liski (the district's administrative centre) by road. Pereyezheye is the nearest rural locality.
