= Nikolayevka, Beloretsky District, Republic of Bashkortostan =

Nikolayevka Николаевка
- Selo
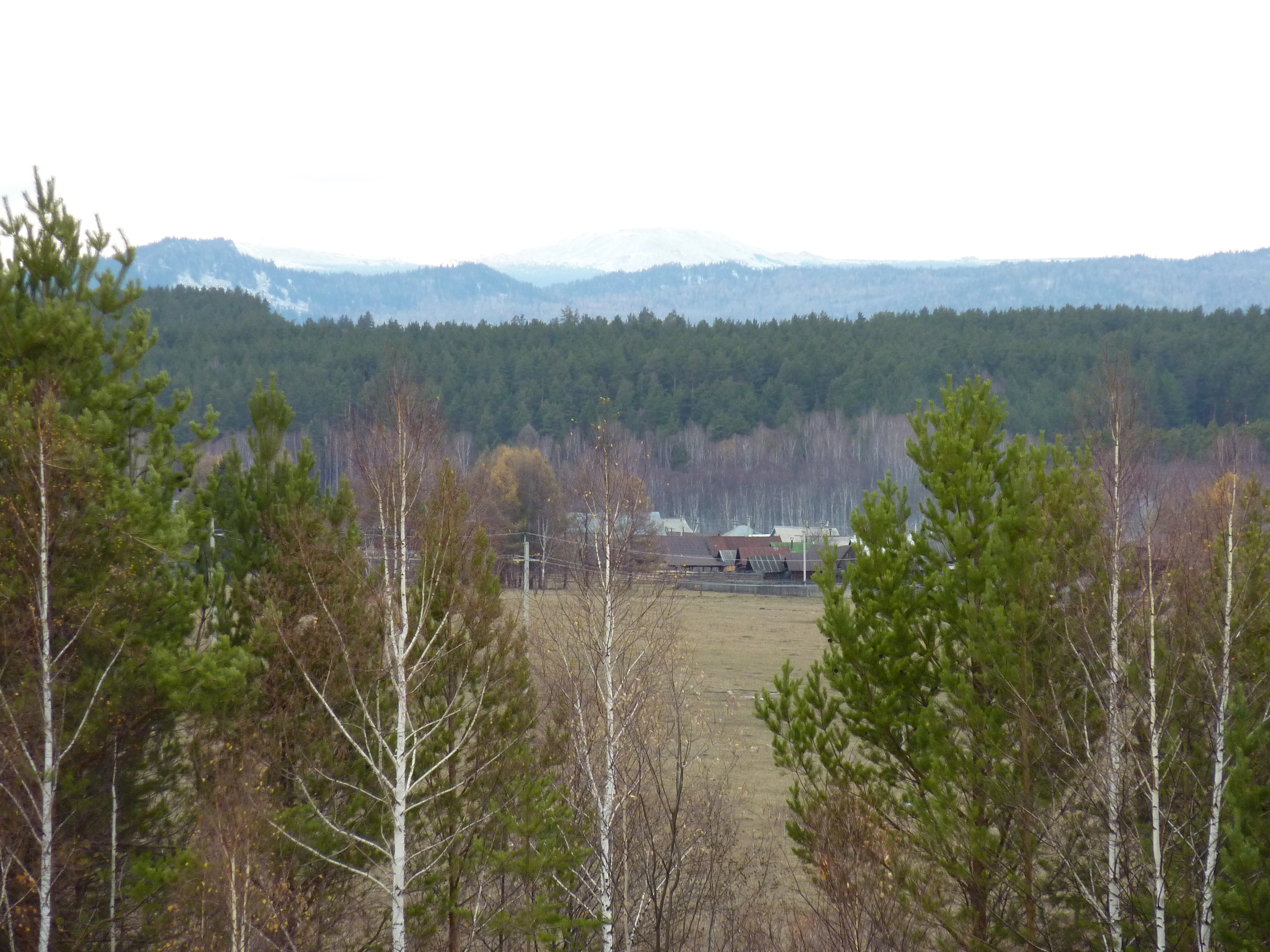
- Nikolaevka village, Beloretsky District

- Location within Bashkortostan Location within Russia
- Coordinates: 54°22′N 58°44′E
- Country: Russia
- Region: Bashkortostan
- District: Beloretsky District
- Time zone: UTC+5:00

Nikolayevka (Russian: Николаевка) is a rural locality (a selo) and the administrative centre of Nikolayevsky Selsoviet, Beloretsky District, Bashkortostan, Russia. The population was 113 as of 2010. There are 3 streets.

== Geography ==
Nikolayevka is located 55 km northeast of Beloretsk (the district's administrative centre) by road. Makhmutovo is the nearest rural locality.
