= Vinogradovka, Khabarovsky District =

Vinogradovka, Khabarovsky District Виноградовка
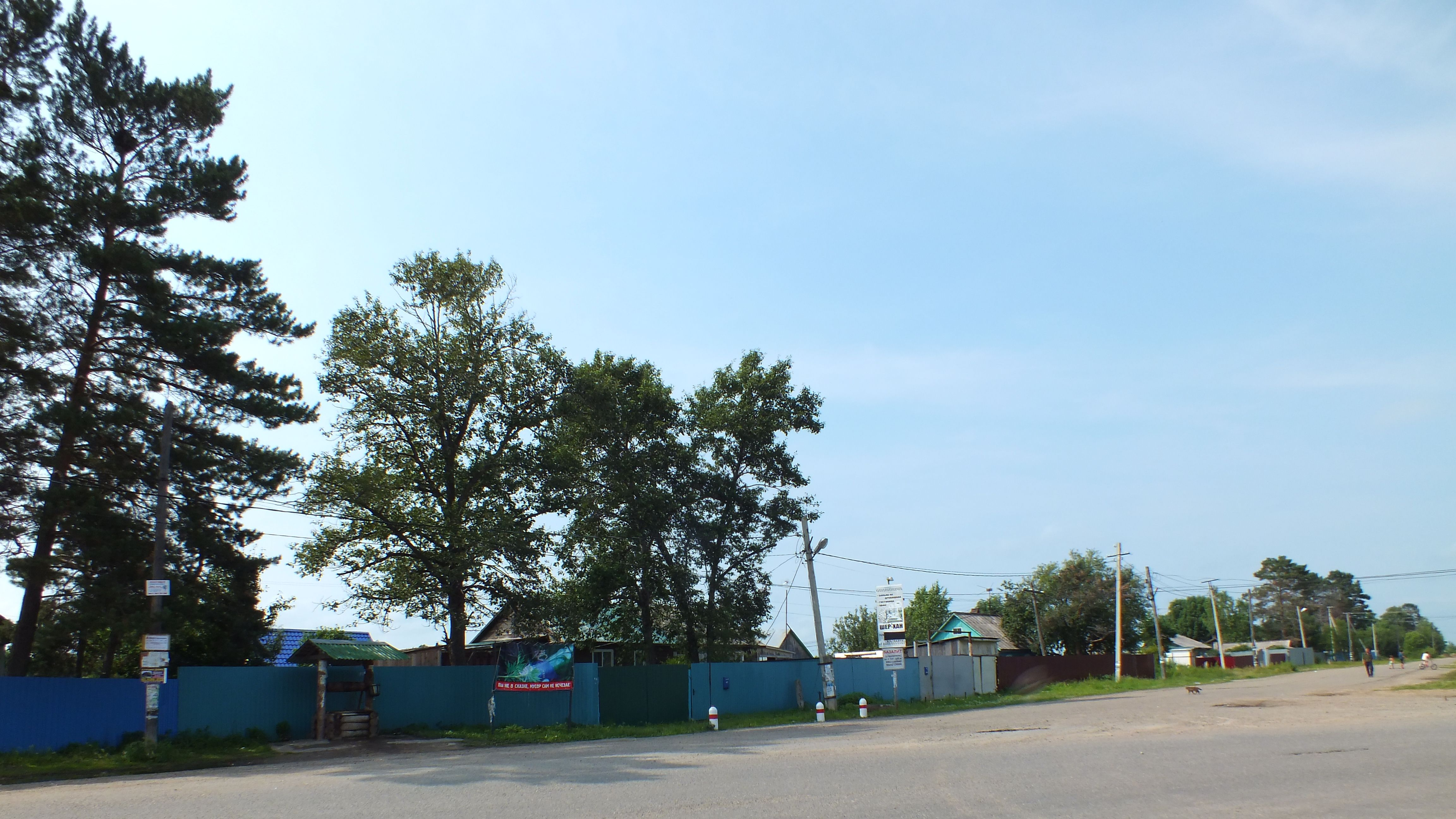
- Entrance street view of Vinogradovka village
- Interactive map of Vinogradovka, Khabarovsky District
- Location of Vinogradovka, Khabarovsky District Vinogradovka, Khabarovsky District (Khabarovsk Krai)
- Coordinates: 48°36′49″N 135°07′22″E
- Country: Russia
- Federal subject: Khabarovsk Krai

Population
  - Estimate (2021): 1,178 )
- Time zone: UTC+10 (MSK+7)
- Postal code: 680547
- OKTMO ID: 08655443121

Vinogradovka (Russian: Виноградовка) is a rural locality (a selo) in the Khabarovsky District of Khabarovsk Krai, Russia. It is administratively incorporated as part of the Michurinskoye Rural Settlement.

== Geography ==
Vinogradovka is located just north of the regional capital city of Khabarovsk, positioned on the right bank of the Amur River along the Voronezhskaya-3 channel system. It lies directly adjacent to the sister village of Michurinskoye. The village is accessible via local roads branching off the main regional highway network.

== History ==
The modern settlement structure was formally recognized during early 20th-century agricultural expansion programs. In 1973, the locality was unified into the newly formed Michurinsky Village Council. In 2018, Vinogradovka became part of a regional telecommunications infrastructure development initiative launched by the Ministry of Information Technologies and Communications of Khabarovsk Krai to deploy high-speed fiber-optic lines throughout the municipality.

== Demographics ==
Unlike many remote rural localities in eastern Russia, Vinogradovka has experienced steady positive population growth due to its proximity to the suburban perimeter of Khabarovsk city:

- 2010 Census: 814 inhabitants
- 2021 Census: 1,178 inhabitants
