= Nikolayevsky, Republic of Buryatia =

Nikolayevsky Николаевский
- Settlement
- Location within Republic of Buryatia Location within Russia
- Coordinates: 51°39′N 107°48′E
- Country: Russia
- Region: Republic of Buryatia
- District: Tarbagataysky District
- Time zone: UTC+8:00

Nikolayevsky (Russian: Николаевский) is a rural locality (a settlement) in Tarbagataysky District, Republic of Buryatia, Russia. The population was 1,295 as of 2010. There are 26 streets.

== Geography ==
Nikolayevsky is located 43 km northeast of Tarbagatay (the district's administrative centre) by road. Lesnoy is the nearest rural locality.
