= Dmitriyevka, Blagoveshchensky District, Republic of Bashkortostan =

Dmitriyevka Дмитриевка
- Village
- Location within Bashkortostan Location within Russia
- Coordinates: 55°04′N 55°51′E
- Country: Russia
- Region: Bashkortostan
- District: Blagoveshchensky District
- Time zone: UTC+5:00

Dmitriyevka (Russian: Дмитриевка) is a rural locality (a village) in Nikolayevsky Selsoviet, Blagoveshchensky District, Bashkortostan, Russia. The population was 343 as of 2010. There are 34 streets.

== Geography ==
Dmitriyevka is located 9 km northwest of Blagoveshchensk (the district's administrative centre) by road. Nikolayevka is the nearest rural locality.
