= Nikolayevsk (disambiguation) =

Nikolayevsk is a town in Volgograd Oblast, Russia.

Nikolayevsk or Nikolaevsk may also refer to:

- Nikolayevsk Urban Settlement, a municipal formation which the town of district significance of Nikolayevsk in Nikolayevsky District of Volgograd Oblast, Russia is incorporated as
- Nikolaevsk, Alaska, a town in Alaska, United States
- Nikolayevsk-on-Amur, a town in Khabarovsk Krai, Russia
- A former name of Pugachyov, Saratov Oblast, Russia

== See also ==
- Nikolayevsky (disambiguation)
- Nikolayev (disambiguation)
- Nikolayevka (disambiguation)
