= Nikolayevka, Blagoveshchensky District, Altai Krai =

Nikolayevka Николаевка
- Selo
- Location within Altai Krai Location within Russia
- Coordinates: 52°57′N 80°10′E
- Country: Russia
- Region: Altai Krai
- District: Blagoveshchensky District
- Time zone: UTC+7:00

Nikolayevka (Russian: Николаевка) is a rural locality (a selo) and the administrative center of Nikolayevsky Selsoviet, Blagoveshchensky District, Altai Krai, Russia. The population was 618 as of 2013. There are 5 streets.

== Geography ==
Nikolayevka is located 28 km northeast of Blagoveshchenka (the district's administrative centre) by road. Tatyanovka is the nearest rural locality.
