= Nikolayevka (Krasnoplamenskoye Rural Settlement), Alexandrovsky District, Vladimir Oblast =

Nikolayevka Николаевка
- Village
- Location within Vladimir Oblast Location within Russia
- Coordinates: 56°31′N 38°38′E
- Country: Russia
- Region: Vladimir Oblast
- District: Alexandrovsky District
- Time zone: UTC+3:00

Nikolayevka (Russian: Николаевка) is a rural locality (a village) in Krasnoplamenskoye Rural Settlement, Alexandrovsky District, Vladimir Oblast, Russia. The population was 3 as of 2010.

== Geography ==
The village is located 15 km south-east from Krasnoye Plamya, 16 km north-west from Alexandrov.
