= Nikolayevka, Zeysky District, Amur Oblast =

Nikolayevka Николаевка
- Selo
- Location within Amur Oblast Location within Russia
- Coordinates: 53°34′N 127°00′E
- Country: Russia
- Region: Amur Oblast
- District: Zeysky District
- Time zone: UTC+9:00

Nikolayevka (Russian: Николаевка) is a rural locality (a selo) and the administrative center of Nikolayevsky Selsoviet of Zeysky District, Amur Oblast, Russia. The population was 269 as of 2018.

== Geography ==
Nikolayevka is located 35 km southwest of Zeya (the district's administrative centre) by road. Nikolayevka-2 is the nearest rural locality.
