= Nikolayevka (station), Nikolayevsky Selsoviet, Mikhaylovsky District, Altai Krai =

Nikolayevka Николаевка
- Station
- Location within Altai Krai Location within Russia
- Coordinates: 51°56′N 79°28′E
- Country: Russia
- Region: Altai Krai
- District: Mikhaylovsky District
- Time zone: UTC+7:00

Nikolayevka (Russian: Николаевка) is a rural locality (a station) in Mikhaylovsky District, Altai Krai, Russia. The population was 5 as of 2013. There are 2 streets.
