= Nikolayevka, Arkhangelsky District, Republic of Bashkortostan =

Nikolayevka Николаевка
- Village
- Location within Bashkortostan Location within Russia
- Coordinates: 54°20′N 56°31′E
- Country: Russia
- Region: Bashkortostan
- District: Arkhangelsky District
- Time zone: UTC+5:00

Nikolayevka (Russian: Николаевка) is a rural locality (a village) in Orlovsky Selsoviet, Arkhangelsky District, Bashkortostan, Russia. The population was 2 as of 2010. There is 1 street.

== Geography ==
Nikolayevka is located 29 km southwest of Arkhangelskoye (the district's administrative centre) by road. Orlovka is the nearest rural locality.
