= Nikolayev =

Nikolayev/Nikolaev (masculine) or Nikolayeva/Nikolaeva (feminine) may refer to:

- Nikolayev (surname) (includes Nikolayeva and Nikolaeva)
- Nikolayev/Nikolaev, Russian spellings of Mykolaiv (disambiguation), several places in Ukraine
- Nikolayev (crater), a Moon crater

== See also ==
- Mykolaiv, a city in Ukraine also known as Nikolayev
- Nikolaevo, a town in Stara Zagora Province, Bulgaria
- Nikolayevka (disambiguation)
- Nikolayevsk (disambiguation)
- Nikolayevsky (disambiguation)
