= Nikolayevka, Nemetsky National District, Altai Krai =

Nikolayevka Николаевка
- Village
- Location within Altai Krai Location within Russia
- Coordinates: 53°13′N 78°43′E
- Country: Russia
- Region: Altai Krai
- District: Nemetsky National District
- Time zone: UTC+7:00

Nikolayevka (Russian: Николаевка) is a rural locality (a selo) and the administrative center of Nikolayevsky Selsoviet of Nemetsky National District, Altai Krai, Russia. The population was 1077 as of 2016. There are 5 streets.

== Geography ==
Nikolayevka is located within the Kulunda Plain, 24 km west of Galbshtadt (the district's administrative centre) by road. Grishkovka is the nearest rural locality.

== Ethnicity ==
The village is inhabited by Russians, Germans and others.
