= Nikolayevka, Yenotayevsky District, Astrakhan Oblast =

Nikolayevka Николаевка
- Selo
- Location within Astrakhan Oblast Location within Russia
- Coordinates: 47°17′N 47°01′E
- Country: Russia
- Region: Astrakhan Oblast
- District: Yenotayevsky District
- Time zone: UTC+4:00

Nikolayevka (Russian: Николаевка) is a rural locality (a selo) in Ivanovo-Nikolayvsky Selsoviet of Yenotayevsky District, Astrakhan Oblast, Russia. The population was 418 as of 2010. There are 5 streets.

== Geography ==
Nikolayevka is located 6 km north of Yenotayevka (the district's administrative centre) by road. Ivanovka is the nearest rural locality.
