= Nikolayevka, Karmaskalinsky District, Republic of Bashkortostan =

Nikolayevka Николаевка
- Selo
- Location within Bashkortostan Location within Russia
- Coordinates: 54°27′N 56°08′E
- Country: Russia
- Region: Bashkortostan
- District: Karmaskalinsky District
- Time zone: UTC+5:00

Nikolayevka (Russian: Николаевка) is a rural locality (a selo) in Nikolayevsky Selsoviet, Karmaskalinsky District, Bashkortostan, Russia. The population was 854 as of 2010. There are 10 streets.

== Geography ==
Nikolayevka is located 13 km north of Karmaskaly (the district's administrative centre) by road. Ulyanovka is the nearest rural locality.
