= Nikolayevka, Nikolayevsky Selsoviet, Sterlitamaksky District, Republic of Bashkortostan =

Nikolayevka Николаевка
- Selo
- Location within Bashkortostan Location within Russia
- Coordinates: 53°31′N 55°34′E
- Country: Russia
- Region: Bashkortostan
- District: Sterlitamaksky District
- Time zone: UTC+5:00

Nikolayevka (Russian: Николаевка) is a rural locality (a selo) and the administrative centre of Nikolayevsky Selsoviet, Sterlitamaksky District, Bashkortostan, Russia. The population was 830 as of 2010.

== Geography ==
It is located 30 km from Sterlitamak.
