= Nikolayevka, Bakalinsky District, Republic of Bashkortostan =

Nikolayevka Николаевка
- Selo
- Location within Bashkortostan Location within Russia
- Coordinates: 55°02′N 54°12′E
- Country: Russia
- Region: Bashkortostan
- District: Bakalinsky District
- Time zone: UTC+5:00

Nikolayevka (Russian: Николаевка) is a rural locality (a selo) in Diyashevsky Selsoviet, Bakalinsky District, Bashkortostan, Russia. The population was 15 as of 2010. There is 1 street.

== Geography ==
Nikolayevka is located 35 km southeast of Bakaly (the district's administrative centre) by road.
