= Nikolayevka, Fyodorovsky District, Republic of Bashkortostan =

Nikolayevka Николаевка
- Village
- Location within Bashkortostan Location within Russia
- Coordinates: 53°07′N 55°07′E
- Country: Russia
- Region: Bashkortostan
- District: Fyodorovsky District
- Time zone: UTC+5:00

Nikolayevka (Russian: Николаевка) is a rural locality (a village) in Dedovsky Selsoviet, Fyodorovsky District, Bashkortostan, Russia. The population was 18 as of 2010. There is 1 street.

== Geography ==
Nikolayevka is located 8 km southwest of Fyodorovka (the district's administrative centre) by road. Akbulatovo is the nearest rural locality.
