= Nikolayevka, Aurgazinsky District, Republic of Bashkortostan =

Nikolayevka Николаевка
- Village
- Location within Bashkortostan Location within Russia
- Coordinates: 54°01′N 56°05′E
- Country: Russia
- Region: Bashkortostan
- District: Aurgazinsky District
- Time zone: UTC+5:00

Nikolayevka (Russian: Николаевка) is a rural locality (a village) in Batyrovsky Selsoviet, Aurgazinsky District, Bashkortostan, Russia. The population was 25 as of 2010. There is 1 street.

== Geography ==
Nikolayevka is located 16 km east of Tolbazy (the district's administrative centre) by road. Knyazevka is the nearest rural locality.
