= Nikolayevsky, Perm Krai =

Nikolayevsky Николаевский
- Settlement
- St. Nicholas Church, Nikolayevsky, Chernushinsky District, Perm Krai

- Location within Perm Krai Location within Russia
- Coordinates: 56°22′N 56°06′E
- Country: Russia
- Region: Perm Krai
- District: Chernushinsky District
- Time zone: UTC+5:00

Nikolayevsky (Russian: Николаевский) is a rural locality (a settlement) in Chernushinsky District, Perm Krai, Russia. The population was 11 as of 2010. There is 1 street.

== Geography ==
Nikolayevsky is located 20 km south of Chernushka (the district's administrative centre) by road. Tanypskiye Klyuchi is the nearest rural locality.
