= Nikolayevsky railway station =

Nikolayevsky railway station may refer to:

- Nikolayevsky station, other name of Leningradsky railway station, a rail terminal in Moscow
- Nikolayevsky station, other name of Moskovsky Rail Terminal, a rail terminal in St. Petersburg
