= Nikolayevka, Nikolayevsky District, Ulyanovsk Oblast =

Nikolayevka Николаевка
- Urban-type settlement
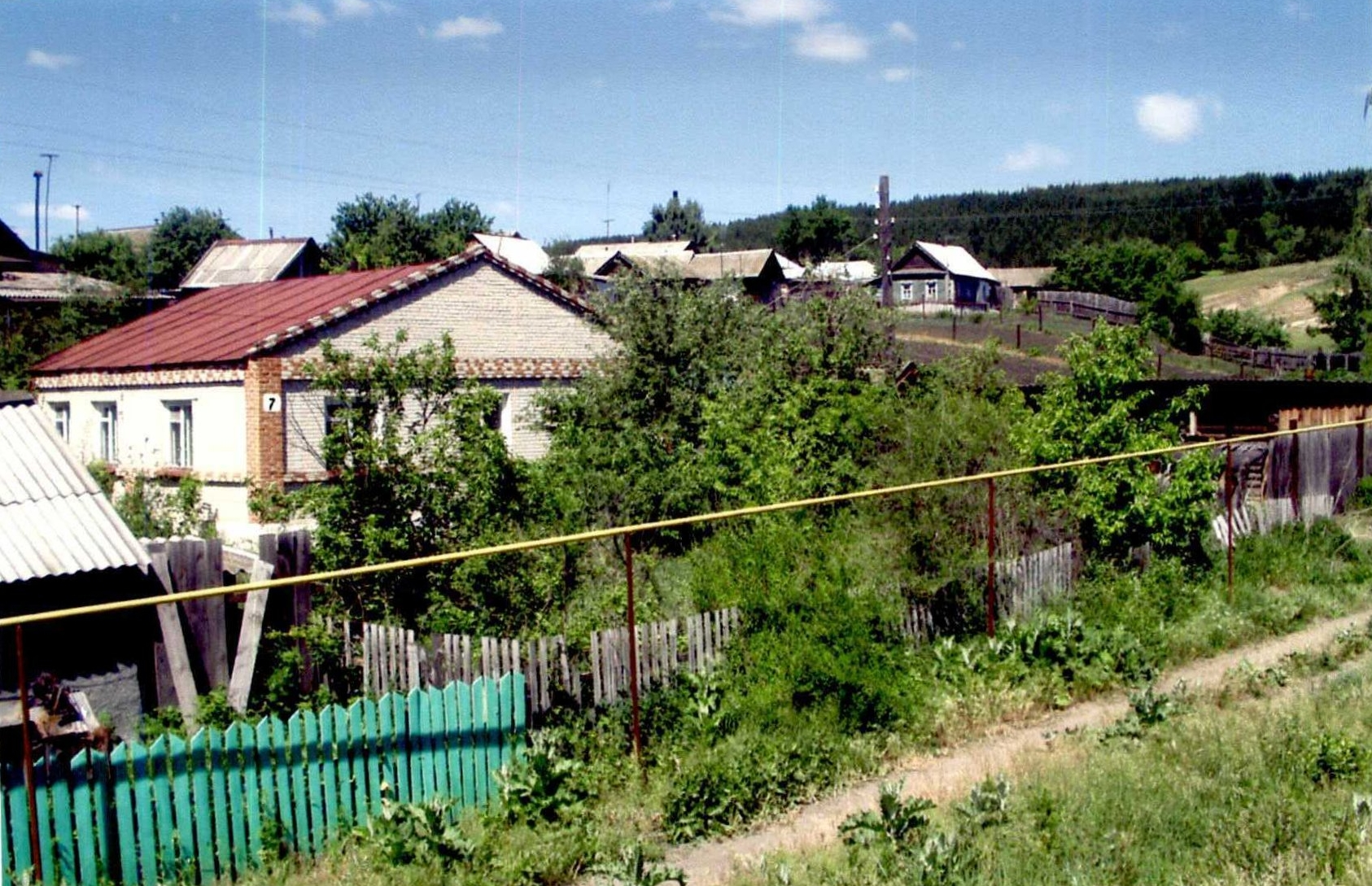

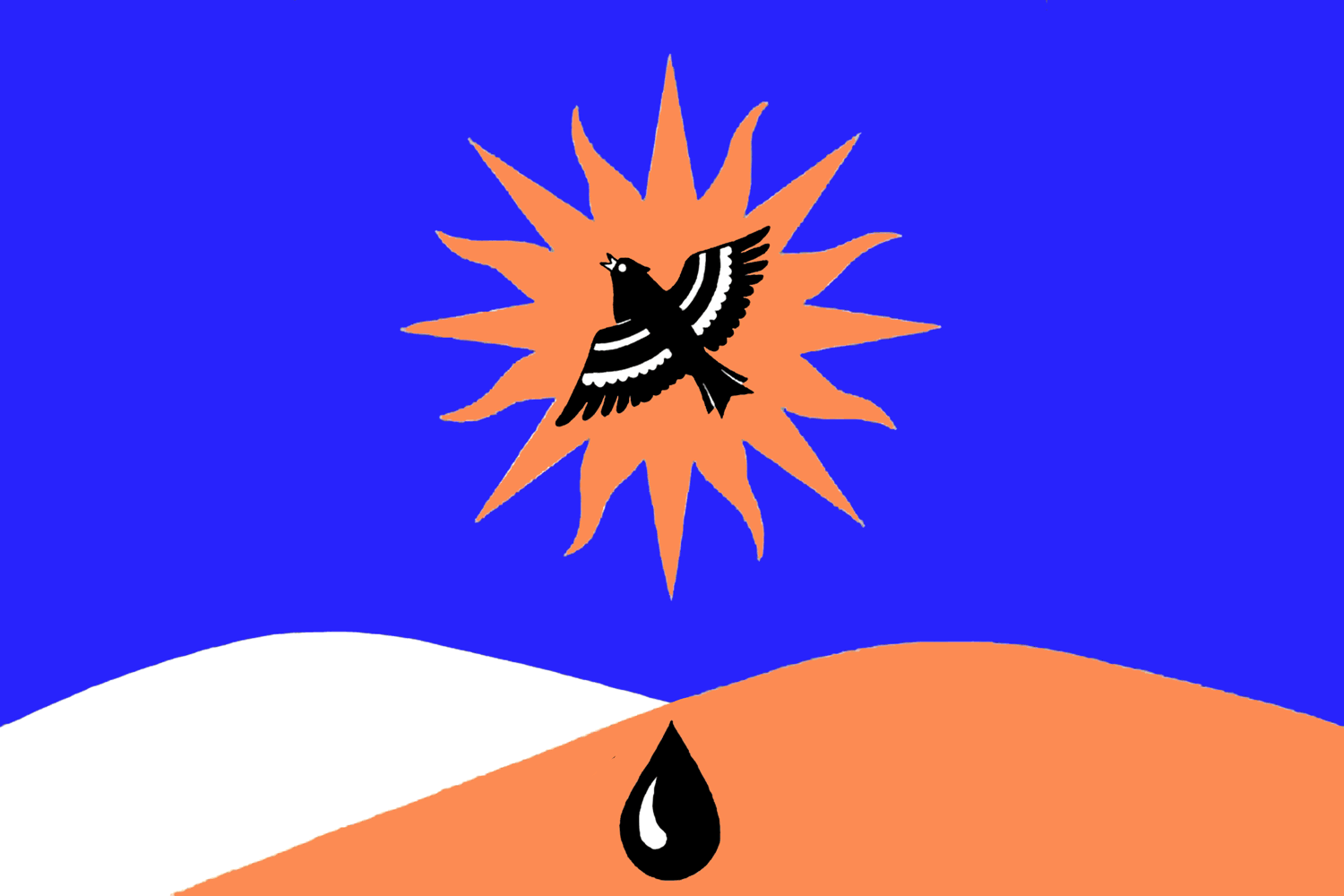
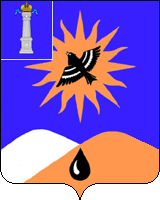
- Flag Coat of arms
- Interactive map of Nikolayevka
- Location of Nikolayevka Nikolayevka (Ulyanovsk Oblast)
- Coordinates: 53.1299°N 47.2171°E
- Country: Russia
- Federal subject: Ulyanovsk Oblast
- Administrative district: Nikolayevsky District
- Elevation: 173 m (568 ft)

Population (2010 Census)
  - Total: 6,389
  - Estimate (2021): 5,697 (−10.8%)
- Time zone: UTC+4 (UTC+04:00)
- Postal code: 433810
- OKTMO ID: 73625151051

Nikolayevka (Russian: Николаевка) is an urban locality (an urban-type settlement) in Nikolayevsky District of Ulyanovsk Oblast, Russia. Population: 6,389 (2010 census); 6,476 (2002 census); 6,434 (1989 Soviet census).
