= Nikolayevsky District, Ulyanovsk Oblast =

Nikolayevsky District Николаевский район (Russian)
- District
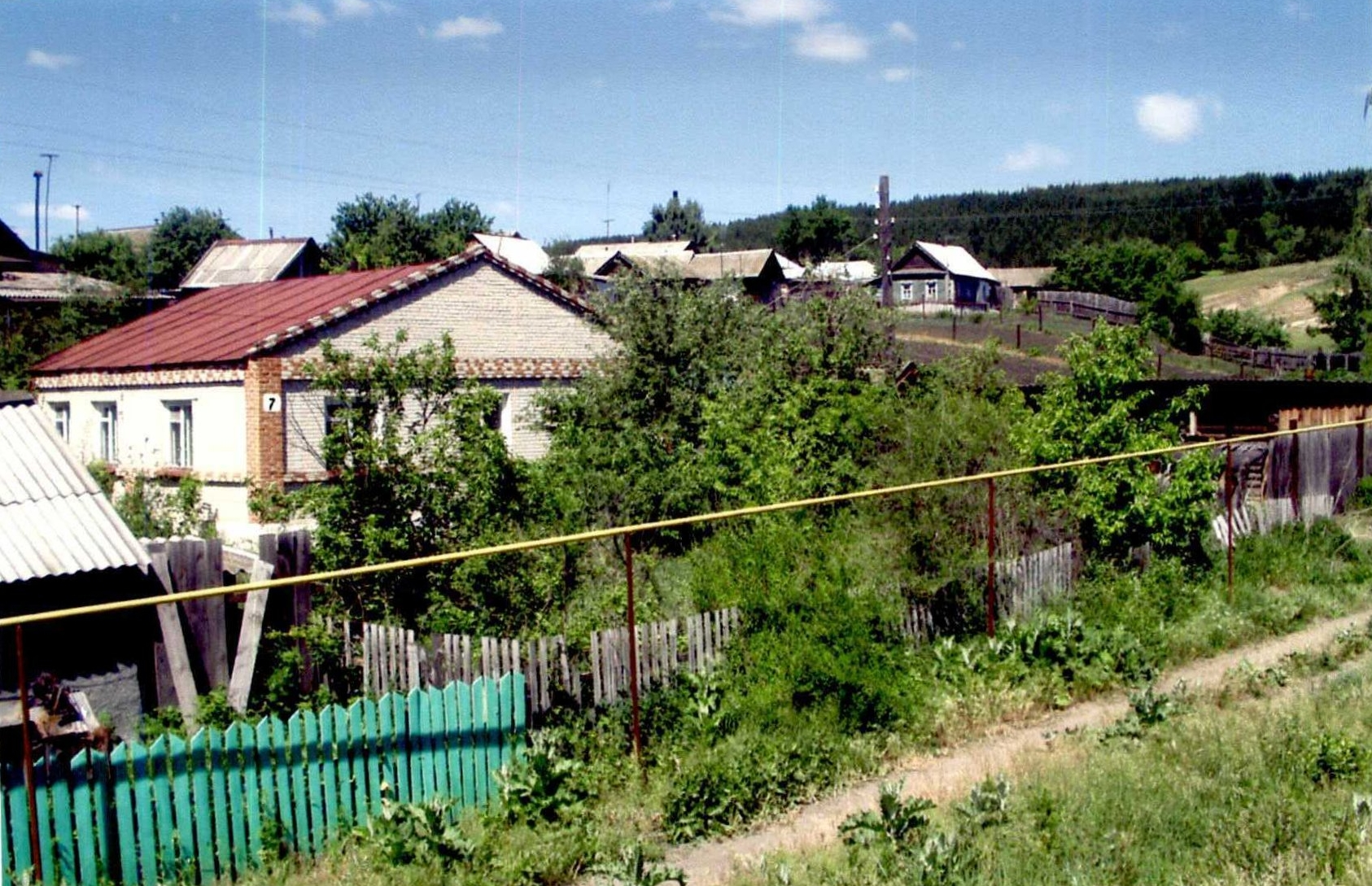
- Nikolaevka, Nikolayevsky District

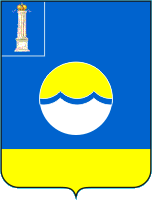
- Flag Coat of arms
- Location of Nikolayevsky District in Ulyanovsk Oblast
- Coordinates: 53°07′32″N 47°12′21″E
- Country: Russia
- Federal subject: Ulyanovsk Oblast
- Established: 16 July 1928
- Administrative center: Nikolayevka

Area
  - Total: 2,084.27 km^{2} (804.74 sq mi)

Population (2010 Census)
  - Total: 27,211
  - Density: 13.055/km^{2} (33.813/sq mi)
  - Urban: 23.5%
  - Rural: 76.5%

Administrative structure
  - Administrative divisions: 1 Settlement okrugs, 8 Rural okrugs
  - Inhabited localities: 1 urban-type settlements, 58 rural localities

Municipal structure
  - Municipally incorporated as: Nikolayevsky Municipal District
  - Municipal divisions: 1 urban settlements, 8 rural settlements
- Time zone: UTC+4 (UTC+04:00)
- OKTMO ID: 73625000
- Website: http://nikolaevka.ulregion.ru/

Nikolayevsky District (Russian: Никола́евский райо́н) is an administrative and municipal district (raion), one of the twenty-one in Ulyanovsk Oblast, Russia. It is located in the southwest of the oblast. The area of the district is 2,084.27 square kilometers (804.74 sq mi). Its administrative center is the urban locality (a work settlement) of Nikolayevka. Population: 27,211 (2010 Census); 30,333 (2002 census); 34,413 (1989 Soviet census). The population of Nikolayevka accounts for 23.5% of the district's total population.
