= Novobureysky =

Novobureysky Новобурейский
- work settlement
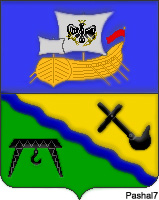
- Coat of arms
- Interactive map of Novobureysky
- Location of Novobureysky Novobureysky (Amur Oblast)
- Coordinates: 49°47′37″N 129°52′01″E
- Country: Russia
- Federal subject: Amur Oblast
- Administrative district: Bureysky District

Population (2010 Census)
  - Total: 8,344
  - Estimate (2023): 6,676 (−20%)

Administrative status
  - Capital of: Bureysky District

Municipal status
  - Municipal district: Bureysky Municipal District
  - Urban settlement: Work Settlement Novobureysky Urban Settlement
  - Capital of: Bureysky Municipal District, Work Settlement Novobureysky Urban Settlement
- Time zone: UTC+9 (MSK+6)
- Postal code: 676700–676799
- OKTMO ID: 10615151051

Novobureysky (Russian: Новобурейский) is an urban locality (a work settlement) and the administrative center of Bureysky District of Amur Oblast, Russia. Population: 8,344 (2010 census); 8,892 (2002 census); 8,988 (1989 Soviet census).
