= Bureysky District =

Bureysky District Бурейский район (Russian)
- District
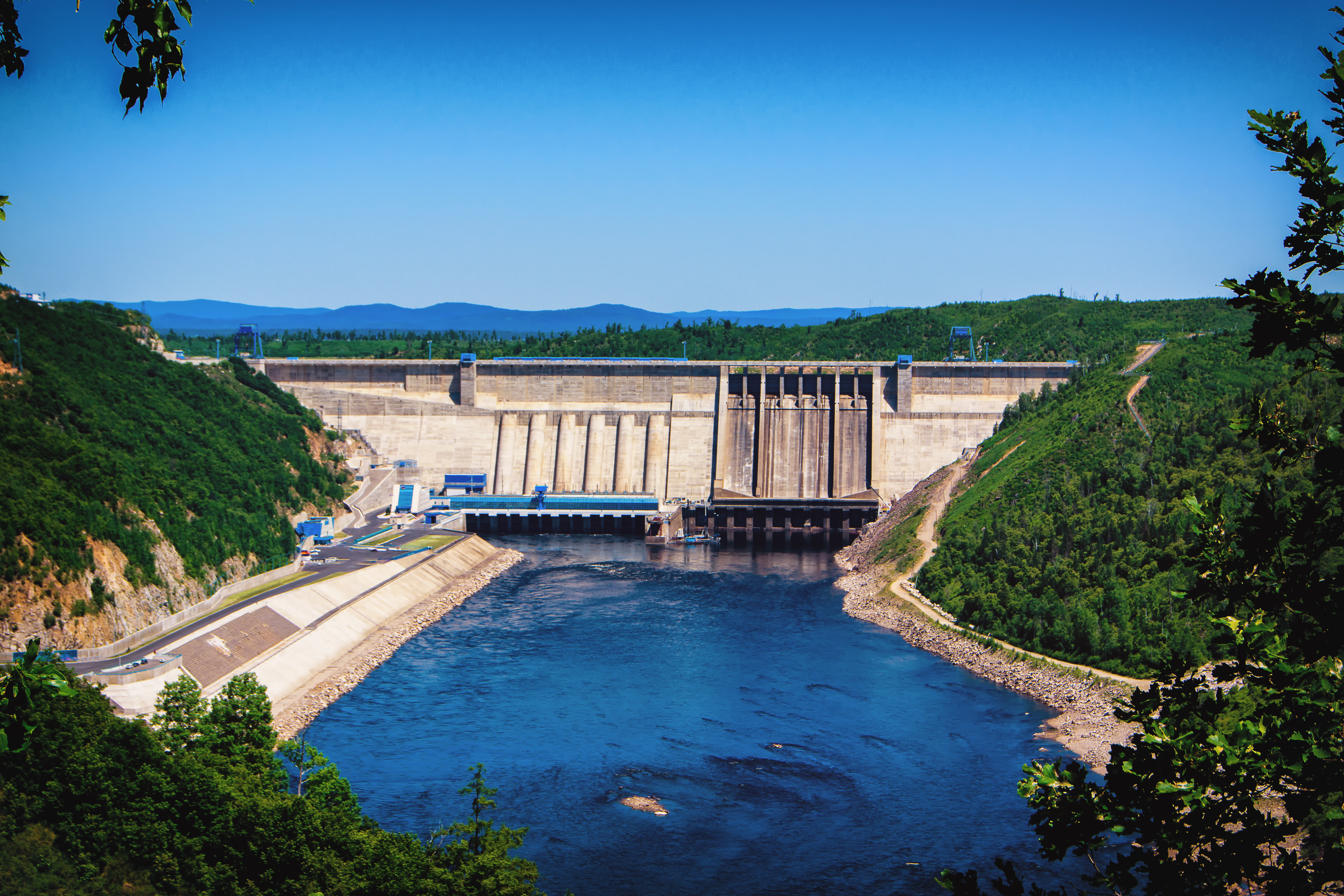
- Talakan Dam, Bureyskoe Reservoir

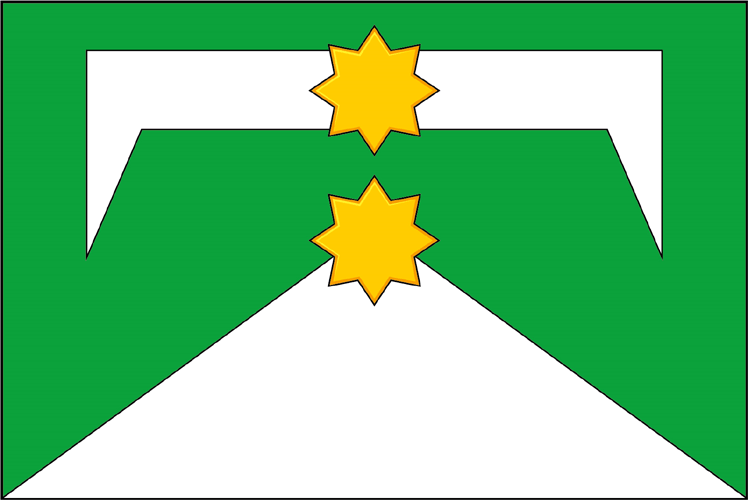
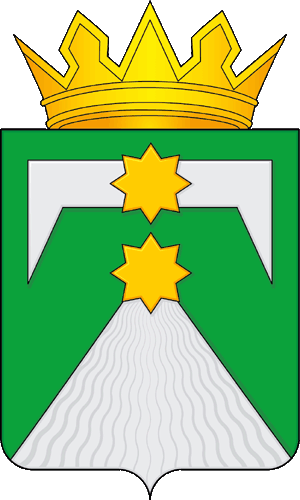
- Flag Coat of arms
- Location of Bureysky District in Amur Oblast
- Coordinates: 49°48′07″N 129°52′16″E
- Country: Russia
- Federal subject: Amur Oblast
- Established: 1935
- Administrative center: Novobureysky

Area
  - Total: 7,095 km^{2} (2,739 sq mi)

Population (2010 Census)
  - Total: 24,021
  - Density: 3.386/km^{2} (8.769/sq mi)
  - Urban: 76.4%
  - Rural: 23.6%

Administrative structure
  - Administrative divisions: 3 Urban settlements, 8 Rural settlements
  - Inhabited localities: 3 urban-type settlements, 19 rural localities

Municipal structure
  - Municipally incorporated as: Bureysky Municipal District
  - Municipal divisions: 3 urban settlements, 8 rural settlements
- Time zone: UTC+9 (MSK+6)
- OKTMO ID: 10615000
- Website: http://admbur.ru/

Bureysky District (Russian: Буре́йский райо́н) is an administrative and municipal district (raion), one of the twenty in Amur Oblast, Russia. The area of the district is 7,095 square kilometers (2,739 sq mi). Its administrative center is the urban locality (a work settlement) of Novobureysky. Population: 24,021 (2010 census); 28,211 (2002 Census); 29,651 (1989 Soviet census). The population of Novobureysky accounts for 34.7% of the district's total population.
