= Gornyak, Altai Krai =

Town in Altai Krai, Russia

Gornyak Горняк
- Town
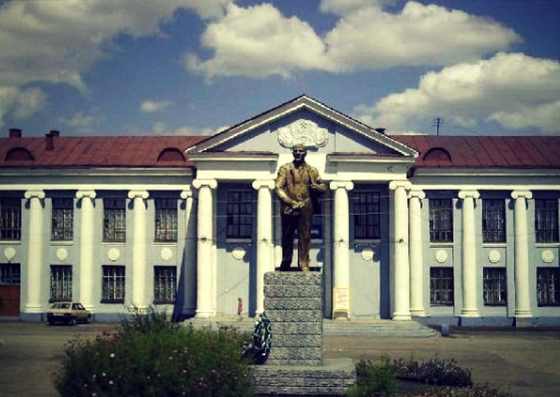

- Coat of arms
- Interactive map of Gornyak
- Location of Gornyak Gornyak (Altai Krai)
- Coordinates: 50°59′N 81°28′E
- Country: Russia
- Federal subject: Altai Krai
- Administrative district: Loktevsky District
- Town of district significanceSelsoviet: Gornyak
- Founded: 1751
- Town status since: 1969
- Elevation: 270 m (890 ft)

Population (2010 Census)
  - Total: 13,918
  - Estimate (2021): 10,112 (−27.3%)

Administrative status
  - Capital of: Loktevsky District, town of district significance of Gornyak

Municipal status
  - Municipal district: Loktevsky Municipal District
  - Urban settlement: Gornyak Urban Settlement
  - Capital of: Loktevsky Municipal District, Gornyak Urban Settlement
- Time zone: UTC+7 (MSK+4)
- Postal code: 658420
- Dialing code: +7 38586
- OKTMO ID: 01625101001

Gornyak (Russian: Горня́к) is a town and the administrative center of Loktevsky District of Altai Krai, Russia, located 360 kilometers (220 mi) southwest of Barnaul, the administrative center of the krai. Population: 13,918 (2010 census); 15,779 (2002 census); 15,833 (1989 Soviet census). It was previously known as Zolotukha (until 1942). It lies adjacent to the Kazakhstan–Russia border.

== History ==
It was founded in 1751 as the selo of Zolotukha (Золоту́ха). In 1942, a miners' settlement was established in place of the old Zolotukha, named Gornyak. It was granted urban-type settlement status in 1946 and town status in 1969.

== Administrative and municipal status ==
Within the framework of administrative divisions, Gornyak serves as the administrative center of Loktevsky District. As an administrative division, it is incorporated within Loktevsky District as the town of district significance of Gornyak. As a municipal division, the town of district significance of Gornyak is incorporated within Loktevsky Municipal District as Gornyak Urban Settlement.
