= Verkh-Suyetka =

Rural locality in Suyetsky District, Russia

Coordinates: 53.302°N 80.044°E

Verkh-Suyetka (Russian: Верх-Суетка) is a rural locality (a selo) and the administrative center of Suyetsky District of Altai Krai, Russia. Population: 2,224 (2010 census); 2,666 (2002 census);
