= Suyetsky District =

Suyetsky District Суетский район (Russian)
- District
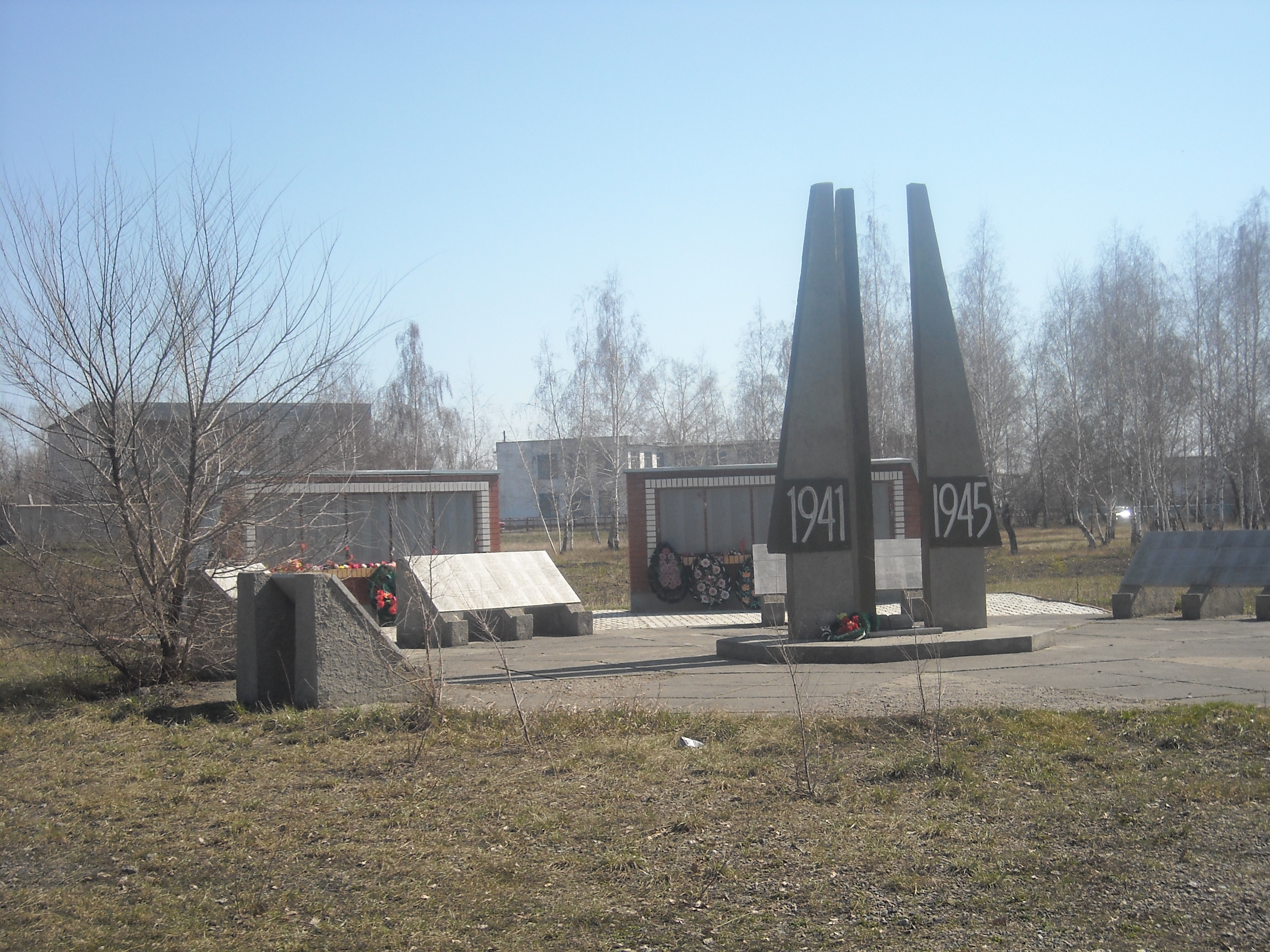
- War Memorial in Suetsky District

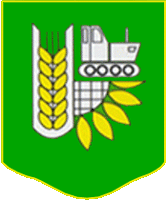
- Coat of arms
- Location of Suyetsky District in Altai Krai
- Coordinates: 53°22′N 80°07′E
- Country: Russia
- Federal subject: Altai Krai
- Established: January 15, 1944 (first), 1989 (second)
- Administrative center: Verkh-Suyetka

Area
  - Total: 1,108 km^{2} (428 sq mi)

Population (2010 Census)
  - Total: 5,120
  - Density: 4.62/km^{2} (12.0/sq mi)
  - Urban: 0%
  - Rural: 100%

Administrative structure
  - Administrative divisions: 4 Selsoviets
  - Inhabited localities: 14 rural localities

Municipal structure
  - Municipally incorporated as: Suyetsky Municipal District
  - Municipal divisions: 0 urban settlements, 14 rural settlements
- Time zone: UTC+7 (MSK+4)
- OKTMO ID: 01641000
- Website: http://admin-suet.ru

Population of Suyetsky District
- 2010 Census: 5,120
- 2002 Census: 6,760

Suyetsky District (Russian: Суетский райо́н) is an administrative and municipal district (raion), one of the fifty-nine districts in Altai Krai, Russia. It is located in the northwest of the krai. The area of the district is 1,108 square kilometers (428 sq mi). Its administrative center is the rural locality (a selo) of Verkh-Suyetka. As of the 2010 Census, the total population of the district was 5,120, with the population of Verkh-Suyetka accounting for 43.4% of that number.

== History ==
The district was established on January 15, 1944 when Altai Krai was divided into districts. It was abolished in 1962 and re-established in 1989.
