= Loktevsky District =

Loktevsky District Локтевский район (Russian)
- District
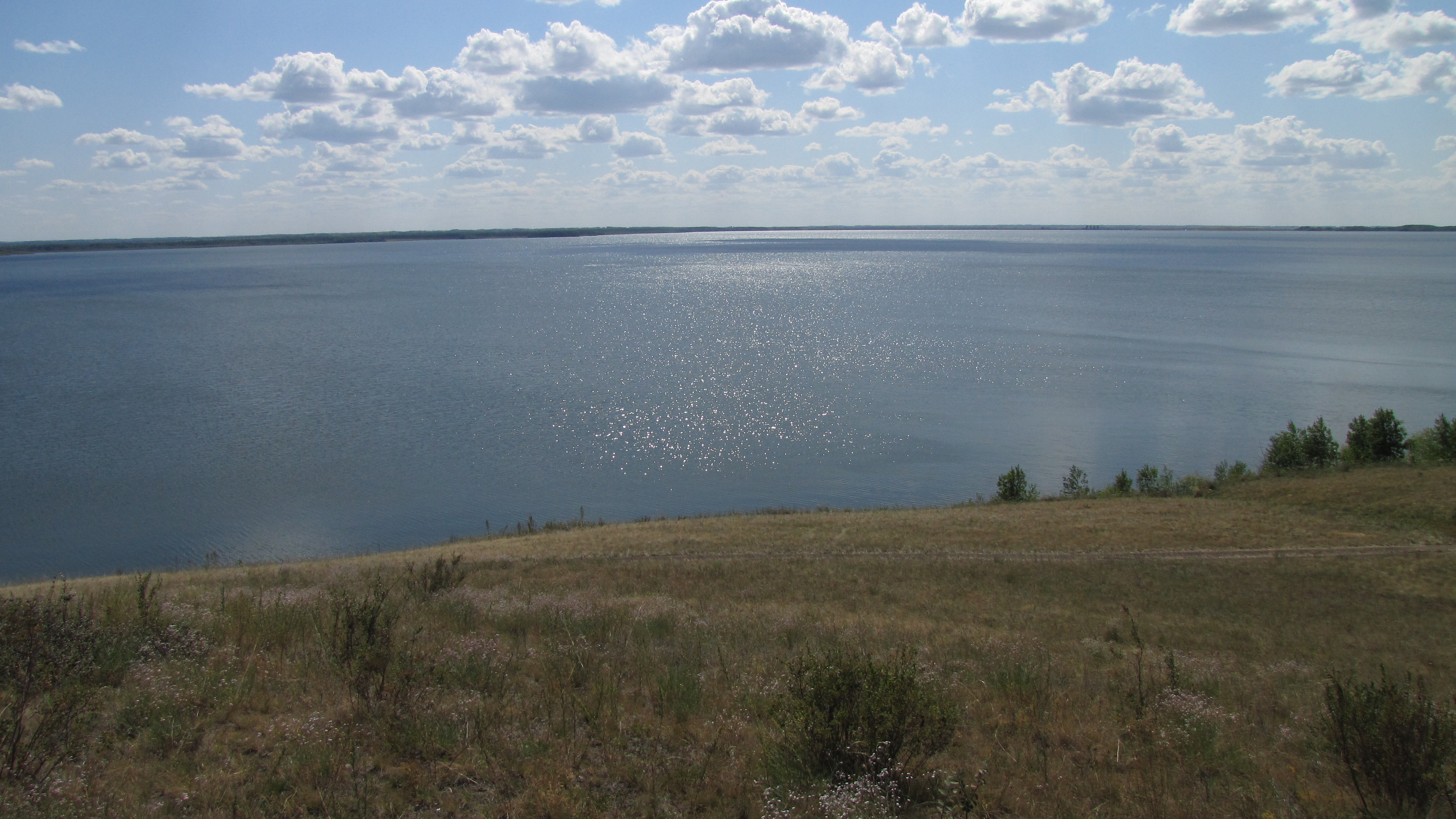
- Gilyov Reservoir, in Loktevsky District

- Coat of arms
- Location of Loktevsky District in Altai Krai
- Coordinates: 51°00′N 81°28′E
- Country: Russia
- Federal subject: Altai Krai
- Established: 1924
- Administrative center: Gornyak

Area
  - Total: 2,340 km^{2} (900 sq mi)

Population (2010 Census)
  - Total: 29,658
  - Density: 12.7/km^{2} (32.8/sq mi)
  - Urban: 46.9%
  - Rural: 53.1%

Administrative structure
  - Administrative divisions: 1 Towns of district significance, 17 Selsoviets
  - Inhabited localities: 1 cities/towns, 25 rural localities

Municipal structure
  - Municipally incorporated as: Loktevsky Municipal District
  - Municipal divisions: 1 urban settlements, 17 rural settlements
- Time zone: UTC+7 (MSK+4)
- OKTMO ID: 01625000
- Website: http://www.loktevskiy-rn.ru/

Loktevsky District (Russian: Ло́ктевский райо́н) is an administrative and municipal district (raion), one of the fifty-nine in Altai Krai, Russia. It is located in the southwest of the krai. The area of the district is 2,340 square kilometers (900 sq mi). Its administrative center is the town of Gornyak. Population: 29,658 (2010 census); 33,984 (2002 census); 34,562 (1989 Soviet census). The population of Gornyak accounts for 46.9% of the district's total population.
