= German exonyms (Kaliningrad Oblast) =

This is a list of German names for inhabited localities in Kaliningrad Oblast, Russia.

| Russian name Inhabited locations with a population of over 5,000 are in bold | German name |
|---|---|
| Alexeyevka | Klein Kackschen (Kleinbirkenhain) |
| Aprelevka | Wargienen |
| Arkhangelskoye | Ebenhausen |
| Artemovka | Argenhof |
| Babushkino | Groß Degesen |
| **Bagrationovsk** | **Preußisch Eylau** |
| **Baltiysk** | **Pillau** |
| Bayevka | Klukeim |
| Belabino | Schiedelau |
| Belkino | Langenfelde |
| Belomorskoye | Hindenburg |
| Bereskovskoye | Waldhausen |
| Beresovka | Groß Sausgarten |
| Beresovo | Schönbaum |
| Biserovo | Tawellningken |
| Bobrovo | Ellernthal |
| Bobrovo | Groß Rudminnen (Wietzheim) |
| Bogatovo | Elchenrode |
| Bogatovo | Rositten |
| Bolgorukovo | Domtau |
| Bolshakovo | Kreuzingen (Groß Skaisgirren) |
| Bolshaya Polyana | Paterswalde |
| Bolshie Berski | Rauterskirch |
| Borkoye | Schiewenau |
| Borodino | Georgenhain |
| Brusovo | Brassen |
| Chalovo | Rödebach |
| Cherkhovo | Uderwangen |
| **Chernyakhovsk** | **Insterburg** |
| Chernyshevskoye | Eydtkau [Eydtkuhnen] |
| Christye Prudy | Tollmingen |
| Chpayevo | Wabbeln |
| Dalneye | Wittenrode-Bitterfelde |
| Dersavino | Laschnicken |
| Divnoye | Neuendorf |
| Dobrino | Nautzken |
| Dobrovolsk | Schloßberg (Pillkallen) |
| Dolgoye | Beinigkehmen (Beinicken) |
| Domovo | Domnau |
| Donskoye | Groß Dirschkeim |
| Dovatorovka | Zwion |
| Druzhba | Allenburg |
| Dsiersinskoye | Gowarten |
| Dubrava | Schulzenwalde |
| Dubrovsky | Duben |
| Fedotovo | Groß Plauen |
| Fevralskoje | Spullen |
| Fillippovka | Dommelkeim |
| Fruzenkoye | Bokellen |
| Furmanovo | Zweilinden |
| Gastellovo | Groß Friedrichsdorf |
| Gavrilovo | Herzogsrode |
| Glushkovo | Plibischken |
| Golovkino | Elchwerder |
| Gordoye | Bürgersdorf |
| Gorodkovo | Skören |
| Gratshevka | Craam |
| Griematshye | Birken |
| Gromovo | Königgrätz |
| **Guryevsk** | **Neuhausen** |
| **Gusev** | **Gumbinnen** |
| Gusevo | Groß Gnie |
| **Gvardeysk** | **Tapiau** |
| Gvardeyskoye | Mühlhausen |
| Ilyinskoye | Kassuben |
| Ilyitshevka | Lank |
| Ilyushino | Mühlengarten |
| Ivanovka | Klein Bärwalde |
| Kalacheyevas | Klein Schillehlen (Kleinschollen) |
| **KALININGRAD** | **KÖNIGSBERG** |
| Kalinino | Bickenmühle |
| Kalininskoye | Hochfließ |
| Kalusskoye | Grünheide |
| Kamezkoye | Saalau |
| Kanash | Königskirch |
| Karamishevo | Schardingen |
| Karlinovka | Aulenbach |
| Kashirskoye | Schaakswitte |
| Khrabovo | Powunden |
| Kladimka | Eschingen |
| Klincovka | Wosegau |
| Komosomolsk | Löwenhagen |
| Konstantinovka | Konradswalde |
| Kornevo | Zinthen |
| Kostromino | Kortmedien |
| Kostrovo | Caspershöfen |
| Krasnoborskoye | Starkenberg |
| Krasnogorskoye | Martinshof |
| Krasnolesnye | Groß Rominten |
| Krasnooktrabrskoye | Groß Ponnau |
| Krasnopolyanskoye | Großgauden |
| Krasnoselje | Hardteck |
| Krasnotorovka | Heiligencreutz |
| Krasnovka | Birkenfeld |
| Krasnoyarskoye | Sodehnen |
| Krasnoye Selo | Hohensalzburg |
| Krasnoye | Lindicken (bei Kreuzingen) |
| Krasnoznamensk | Haselberg |
| Krasnoznamenskoye | Dollstädt |
| Krasny Bor | Krakau |
| Krasnoye | Haffwerder (bei Labiau) |
| Krilovo | Nordenburg |
| Kruglovka | Neuendorf |
| Kruglovo | Polehnen |
| Kubanovka | Roßlinde |
| Kumachevo | Kuhmehnen |
| Kurortnoye | Wohmsdorf |
| Kutusovo | Kleschauen |
| Ladushkin | Ludwigsort |
| Laskino | Godrienen |
| Lasovskoye | Trömpau |
| Leninskoye | Weidenau |
| Lesistoye | Nassawen |
| Lesnoy | Ludwigswalde (bei Königsberg) |
| Lesnoy | Sarkau (Kuhrische Nehrung) |
| Lesnoy | Eichenberg |
| Lesnoya | Großlenkau |
| Lesnoye | Metgethen |
| Levoberesnoye | Schakendorf |
| Lipnyaki | Trausen |
| Lipovo | Ohldorf |
| Livenskoye | Galbrasten (Dreifurt) |
| Livenskoye | Kragelischken (Kragelingen) |
| Logvino | Medenau |
| Lugovoye | Gutenfeld |
| Lushki | Uhlenhorst |
| L'vovskoye | Gudwallen |
| Lyublino | Seerappen (?Schorschenen) |
| Malcevo | Kleinkarpau |
| Malinovka | Podewitten |
| Malinovka | Sprakten |
| **Mamonovo** | **Heiligenbeil** |
| Marshalskoye | Gallgarben |
| Maryskoye | Ackerau |
| Matrozovo | Gilge (am Kuhrischen Haff) |
| Matrozovo | Uggehnen (bei Königsberg) |
| Mayak | Brüsterort |
| Mayakovskoye | Nemmersdorf |
| Mayovka | Georgenburg |
| Mayskoye | Mallwen |
| Medovoye | Sollnicken |
| Melnikovo | Rudau |
| Mezdurechye | Kallenfeld (bei Gumbinnen) |
| Mezdurechye | Norkitten (bei Insterburg) |
| Michaylovo | Hagelsberg |
| Mordovskoye | Groß Legitten |
| Morskoy | Pillkoppen |
| Mostovoye | Sköpen |
| Kazyr | Klein Gnie |
| Muromskoye | Laptau |
| Mysovka | Karkeln |
| Nadesdino | Lampasch |
| Nakhimovo | Groß Scharlack |
| **Neman** | **Ragnit** |
| Nemanskoye | Trappen |
| Nesterov | Ebenrode [Stallupöhnen] |
| Nevskoye | Schloßbach [Pillupoehnen] |
| Nikolskoye | Giewerlauken (Hirschflur) |
| Nivenskoye | Wittenberg |
| Novaya Derevnya | Alt Gertlauken |
| Novgorodskoye | Mettkelm |
| Novo Bobruysk | Ilmsdorf |
| Novo Moskovskoye | Popitten |
| Novokolkhosnoye | Argenbrück |
| Novoselovo | Groß Rödersdorf |
| Novostroyevo | Trempen |
| Novozelky | Neuendorf |
| Okhotnoye | Gerhardsweide |
| Oktabrskoye | Klein Schönau |
| Okunevo | Nodems-Rothenen |
| Olkhovka | Köllmisch-Damerau |
| Otradnoye | Stroppau |
| Ovarasnaya Novaya | Blumental |
| Ozerki | Groß Lindenau |
| Ozinovka | Stampelken |
| **Ozyorsk** | **Angerapp** |
| Panfilovo | Dreimühl |
| Partizankoye | Schönmohr |
| Parusnoye | Neuendorf |
| Perelesnoye | Pagelienen |
| Pereslawkoye | Drugehnen |
| Perevalovo | Mulden |
| Petropavlovskoje | Groß Schillehlischken (Großschollen) |
| Petropavlovskoje | Neu Eggleningken |
| Petropavlovskoje | Pötkallen (Pötken) |
| Petrovo | Zielkeim |
| **Pionerskiy** | **Neu Kuhren** |
| Plavno | Plauendorf |
| Pobedino | Schillfelde |
| Pogranichny | Hermsdorf |
| Pogranitchnoye | Groß Ilmen |
| Pokryshkino | Grundhausen |
| **Polessk** | **Labiau** |
| Poltavskoye | Mühlenhöhe |
| Poretshye | Allenau |
| Povarovka | Germau |
| Pravdino | Grumbkowsfelde |
| Pravdinsk | Friedland in Ostpreußen |
| Prazolovo | Schönefeld |
| Priboi | Rosehnen |
| Pribreshny | Heidewaldburg |
| Prichaly | Inse |
| Prigorodny | Trykrehnen |
| **Primorsk** | **Fischhausen** |
| Primorye | Groß Kuhren |
| Priodrosnoye | Seßlacken |
| Priozerye | Argendorf |
| Privolnoye | Neunassau |
| Prokhadnoye | Herdenau |
| Prudy | Kadgiehnen |
| Pskovskoye | Friedrichsberg |
| Pushkino | Göritten |
| Pyatridorosnoye | Baldiau |
| Radusnoye | Jagdhaus Rominten |
| Rasino | Mövenort |
| Romanovo | Pobetten |
| Roshchino | Georgenau |
| Rovnoye | Heinrichsdorf |
| Rsevskoye | Schwedenfeld |
| Rudakovo | Ruddecken |
| Ryabinovka | Schmoditten |
| Ryba | Loye |
| Rybachy | Rositten |
| Shepetovka | Auerfließ |
| Shipovka | Groß Blumenau |
| Shirokoye | Schönbruch |
| Shoseynoye | Kalgen |
| Shuvalovo | Ulrichsdorf |
| Sinyavino | Groß Hubnicken |
| Slavanskoye | Pronitten |
| Slavinsk | Goldbach |
| **Slavsk** | **Heinrichswalde** |
| Slavskoye | Kreuzburg |
| Sadovo | Groß-Kackschen (Gross Kackschen) (Birkenhein) |
| Soldatovo | Friedrichsthal |
| Sopkino | Rosenberg |
| Sosnovka | Groß Baum (bei Labiau) |
| Sosnovska | Fritzen (bei Königsberg) |
| **Sovetsk** | **Tilsit** |
| Sovkhoshnoye | Packerau |
| Stepnoye | Gaiden |
| **Svetlogorsk** | **Rauschen** |
| Svetloye | Kobbelbude |
| **Svetly** | **Zimmerbude** |
| Svoboda | Jänichen |
| Talpaki | Mattenau |
| Tarazovka | Wilhelmsrode |
| Timiryasevo | Neukirch |
| Timofeyevo | Sandkirchen |
| Tishino | Abschwagen |
| Tretyakovo | Sodargen |
| Tushino | Dammfelde |
| Ugrumovo-Novoye | Mattenau |
| Ulyanovo | Breitenstein |
| Ushakovo | Brandenburg |
| Uzlovoye | Neuendorf |
| Vatutino | Ellenbruch |
| Veselovka | Mittenfelde |
| Veseloye | Balga |
| Vetrovo | Wodehnen |
| Veznovo | Kussen |
| Vishnevoye | Werfen (bei Schillen) |
| Vizokoye | Hainau |
| Vladimirovo | Tharau |
| Volodarovka | Schwalbental |
| Vzmorye | Groß & Klein Heidekrug |
| Yablonevka | Lichtenhagen |
| **Yantarny** | **Palmnicken** |
| Yasnaya Polyana | Trakehnen |
| Yasnoye | Kuckerneese |
| Yelniki | Weidlacken |
| Yelovoye | Tannsee |
| Yermakovo | Deutsch Wilten |
| Yershovo | Grünlinde |
| Yudino | Jürgenfelde |
| Yushny | Jesau |
| Zadovoye | Ellern |
| Zadowoye | Ballethen |
| Zagorodnoye | Neuendorf |
| Zagorskoye | Strigengrund |
| Zalesye | Kornfelde |
| Zalivino | Rinderort |
| Zalivino | Tawe |
| Zalivnoye | Jägertal |
| Zamenka-Novaya | Groß Hoppenbruch |
| Zaozornoye | Kleinfriedeck |
| Zapovednoye | Waldburg |
| Zaranskoye | Laukischken |
| Zaratovskoye | Adlerswalde |
| Zarechnoye | Memelwalde |
| Zarechye | Kaimen (bei Labiau) |
| Zarechye | Pregelswalde (bei Tapiau) |
| Zarucheynoye | Groß Schirrau |
| Zelencovo | Schulzenhof |
| **Zelenogradsk** | **Cranz** |
| Zeleznodorozny | Gerdauen |
| Zemenovo | Fuchsberg |
| Zevernoye | Kleinblecken |
| Zevskoye | Böttchersdorf |
| Zilino | Schillen |
| Zinyavino | Angereck (bei Gumbinnen) |
| Zinyavino | Groß Hubnicken (bei Palmnicken) |
| Znamensk | Wehlau |
| Zurvorov | Zohpen |

== See also ==
- List of cities and towns in East Prussia
- German exonyms
- List of European exonyms
