= Zarechye =

Set index of articles associated with the same name

Zarechye (Russian: Заречье) is the name of several inhabited localities in Russia.

== Belgorod Oblast ==
As of 2010, two rural localities in Belgorod Oblast bear this name:

- Zarechye, Korochansky District, Belgorod Oblast, a khutor in Korochansky District
- Zarechye, Shebekinsky District, Belgorod Oblast, a khutor in Shebekinsky District

== Bryansk Oblast ==
As of 2010, fourteen rural localities in Bryansk Oblast bear this name:

- Zarechye, Lopatensky Selsoviet, Klintsovsky District, Bryansk Oblast, a village in Lopatensky Selsoviet of Klintsovsky District
- Zarechye, Turosnyansky Selsoviet, Klintsovsky District, Bryansk Oblast, a settlement in Turosnyansky Selsoviet of Klintsovsky District
- Zarechye, Komarichsky District, Bryansk Oblast, a settlement in Yevdokimovsky Selsoviet of Komarichsky District
- Zarechye, Krasnogorsky District, Bryansk Oblast, a settlement in Kibirshchinsky Selsoviet of Krasnogorsky District
- Zarechye, Oskolkovsky Selsoviet, Mglinsky District, Bryansk Oblast, a settlement in Oskolkovsky Selsoviet of Mglinsky District
- Zarechye, Velikodubrovsky Selsoviet, Mglinsky District, Bryansk Oblast, a settlement in Velikodubrovsky Selsoviet of Mglinsky District
- Zarechye, Vetlevsky Selsoviet, Mglinsky District, Bryansk Oblast, a settlement in Vetlevsky Selsoviet of Mglinsky District
- Zarechye, Gushchinsky Selsoviet, Pochepsky District, Bryansk Oblast, a village in Gushchinsky Selsoviet of Pochepsky District
- Zarechye, Krasnorogsky Selsoviet, Pochepsky District, Bryansk Oblast, a settlement in Krasnorogsky Selsoviet of Pochepsky District
- Zarechye, Shumorovsky Selsoviet, Pochepsky District, Bryansk Oblast, a settlement in Shumorovsky Selsoviet of Pochepsky District
- Zarechye, Supryaginsky Selsoviet, Pochepsky District, Bryansk Oblast, a village in Supryaginsky Selsoviet of Pochepsky District
- Zarechye, Valuyetsky Selsoviet, Pochepsky District, Bryansk Oblast, a village in Valuyetsky Selsoviet of Pochepsky District
- Zarechye, Gorodetsky Selsoviet, Vygonichsky District, Bryansk Oblast, a settlement in Gorodetsky Selsoviet of Vygonichsky District
- Zarechye, Khmelevsky Selsoviet, Vygonichsky District, Bryansk Oblast, a settlement in Khmelevsky Selsoviet of Vygonichsky District

== Republic of Buryatia ==
As of 2010, one rural locality in the Republic of Buryatia bears this name:

- Zarechye, Republic of Buryatia, a selo in Sukhinsky Selsoviet of Kabansky District

== Chelyabinsk Oblast ==
As of 2010, one rural locality in Chelyabinsk Oblast bears this name:

- Zarechye, Chelyabinsk Oblast, a settlement in Pokrovsky Selsoviet of Varnensky District

== Irkutsk Oblast ==
As of 2010, one rural locality in Irkutsk Oblast bears this name:

- Zarechye, Irkutsk Oblast, a village in Nizhneudinsky District

== Ivanovo Oblast ==
As of 2010, two rural localities in Ivanovo Oblast bear this name:

- Zarechye, Ivanovsky District, Ivanovo Oblast, a village in Ivanovsky District
- Zarechye, Komsomolsky District, Ivanovo Oblast, a village in Komsomolsky District

== Kaliningrad Oblast ==
As of 2010, four rural localities in Kaliningrad Oblast bear this name:

- Zarechye, Chernyakhovsky District, Kaliningrad Oblast, a settlement in Svobodnensky Rural Okrug of Chernyakhovsky District
- Zarechye, Guryevsky District, Kaliningrad Oblast, a settlement in Dobrinsky Rural Okrug of Guryevsky District
- Zarechye, Gvardeysky District, Kaliningrad Oblast, a settlement in Ozerkovsky Rural Okrug of Gvardeysky District
- Zarechye, Polessky District, Kaliningrad Oblast, a settlement in Zalesovsky Rural Okrug of Polessky District

== Kaluga Oblast ==
As of 2010, six rural localities in Kaluga Oblast bear this name:

- Zarechye, Kaluga, Kaluga Oblast, a village under the administrative jurisdiction of the city of Kaluga
- Zarechye, Baryatinsky District, Kaluga Oblast, a selo in Baryatinsky District
- Zarechye, Borovsky District, Kaluga Oblast, a village in Borovsky District
- Zarechye (selo), Kozelsky District, Kaluga Oblast, a selo in Kozelsky District
- Zarechye (village), Kozelsky District, Kaluga Oblast, a village in Kozelsky District
- Zarechye, Ulyanovsky District, Kaluga Oblast, a selo in Ulyanovsky District

== Republic of Karelia ==
As of 2010, two rural localities in the Republic of Karelia bear this name:

- Zarechye, Sortavala, Republic of Karelia, a settlement under the administrative jurisdiction of the city of republic significance of Sortavala
- Zarechye, Medvezhyegorsky District, Republic of Karelia, a village in Medvezhyegorsky District

== Kirov Oblast ==
As of 2010, one rural locality in Kirov Oblast bears this name:

- Zarechye, Kirov Oblast, a selo in Zarechensky Rural Okrug of Podosinovsky District

== Komi Republic ==
As of 2010, one rural locality in the Komi Republic bears this name:

- Zarechye, Komi Republic, a village in Kozhmudor selo Administrative Territory of Ust-Vymsky District

== Kostroma Oblast ==
As of 2010, six rural localities in Kostroma Oblast bear this name:

- Zarechye, Galichsky District, Kostroma Oblast, a village in Dmitriyevskoye Settlement of Galichsky District
- Zarechye, Kostromskoy District, Kostroma Oblast, a village in Baksheyevskoye Settlement of Kostromskoy District
- Zarechye, Krasnoselsky District, Kostroma Oblast, a village in Chapayevskoye Settlement of Krasnoselsky District
- Zarechye, Makaryevsky District, Kostroma Oblast, a village in Yurkinskoye Settlement of Makaryevsky District
- Zarechye, Nerekhtsky District, Kostroma Oblast, a village in Volzhskoye Settlement of Nerekhtsky District
- Zarechye, Vokhomsky District, Kostroma Oblast, a village in Tikhonovskoye Settlement of Vokhomsky District

== Kurgan Oblast ==
As of 2010, two rural localities in Kurgan Oblast bear this name:

- Zarechye, Kargapolsky District, Kurgan Oblast, a village in Maysky Selsoviet of Kargapolsky District
- Zarechye, Kataysky District, Kurgan Oblast, a settlement in Ilyinsky Selsoviet of Kataysky District

== Kursk Oblast ==
As of 2010, nine rural localities in Kursk Oblast bear this name:

- Zarechye, Cheremisinovsky District, Kursk Oblast, a village in Stakanovsky Selsoviet of Cheremisinovsky District
- Zarechye, Fatezhsky District, Kursk Oblast, a khutor in Rusanovsky Selsoviet of Fatezhsky District
- Zarechye, Khomutovsky District, Kursk Oblast, a settlement in Romanovsky Selsoviet of Khomutovsky District
- Zarechye, Manturovsky District, Kursk Oblast, a selo in Zarechensky Selsoviet of Manturovsky District
- Zarechye, Oktyabrsky District, Kursk Oblast, a khutor in Starkovsky Selsoviet of Oktyabrsky District
- Zarechye, Shchigrovsky District, Kursk Oblast, a village in Bolshezmeinsky Selsoviet of Shchigrovsky District
- Zarechye, Sovetsky District, Kursk Oblast, a village in Krasnodolinsky Selsoviet of Sovetsky District
- Zarechye, Timsky District, Kursk Oblast, a village in Zarechensky Selsoviet of Timsky District
- Zarechye, Zheleznogorsky District, Kursk Oblast, a khutor in Nizhnezhdanovsky Selsoviet of Zheleznogorsky District

== Leningrad Oblast ==
As of 2010, seven rural localities in Leningrad Oblast bear this name:

- Zarechye, Boksitogorsky District, Leningrad Oblast, a village in Bolshedvorskoye Settlement Municipal Formation of Boksitogorsky District
- Zarechye, Kingiseppsky District, Leningrad Oblast, a village in Bolshelutskoye Settlement Municipal Formation of Kingiseppsky District
- Zarechye, Luzhsky District, Leningrad Oblast, a village in Skreblovskoye Settlement Municipal Formation of Luzhsky District
- Zarechye, Tikhvinsky District, Leningrad Oblast, a village in Shugozerskoye Settlement Municipal Formation of Tikhvinsky District
- Zarechye, Berezhkovskoye Settlement Municipal Formation, Volkhovsky District, Leningrad Oblast, a village in Berezhkovskoye Settlement Municipal Formation of Volkhovsky District
- Zarechye, Selivanovskoye Settlement Municipal Formation, Volkhovsky District, Leningrad Oblast, a village in Selivanovskoye Settlement Municipal Formation of Volkhovsky District
- Zarechye, Vyborgsky District, Leningrad Oblast, a logging depot settlement under the administrative jurisdiction of Primorskoye Settlement Municipal Formation of Vyborgsky District

== Lipetsk Oblast ==
As of 2010, one rural locality in Lipetsk Oblast bears this name:

- Zarechye, Lipetsk Oblast, a settlement in Preobrazhensky Selsoviet of Izmalkovsky District

== Moscow Oblast ==
As of 2010, four inhabited localities in Moscow Oblast bear this name:

- Zarechye, Zarechye Work Settlement, Odintsovsky District, Moscow Oblast, an urban locality (a work settlement) in Odintsovsky District
- Zarechye, Mozhaysky District, Moscow Oblast, a rural locality (a village) in Borisovskoye Rural Settlement of Mozhaysky District, Moscow Oblast
- Zarechye, Uspenskoye Rural Settlement, Odintsovsky District, Moscow Oblast, a rural locality (a settlement) in Uspenskoye Rural Settlement of Odintsovsky District
- Zarechye, Yegoryevsky District, Moscow Oblast, a rural locality (a village) in Savvinskoye Rural Settlement of Yegoryevsky District

== Novgorod Oblast ==
As of 2010, fifteen rural localities in Novgorod Oblast bear this name:

- Zarechye, Khvoyninsky District, Novgorod Oblast, a village in Ostakhnovskoye Settlement of Khvoyninsky District
- Zarechye, Novorakhinskoye Settlement, Krestetsky District, Novgorod Oblast, a village in Novorakhinskoye Settlement of Krestetsky District
- Zarechye, Ruchyevskoye Settlement, Krestetsky District, Novgorod Oblast, a village in Ruchyevskoye Settlement of Krestetsky District
- Zarechye, Lyubytinsky District, Novgorod Oblast, a village under the administrative jurisdiction of Nebolchskoye Settlement of Lyubytinsky District
- Zarechye, Malovishersky District, Novgorod Oblast, a village in Verebyinskoye Settlement of Malovishersky District
- Zarechye, Maryovsky District, Novgorod Oblast, a village in Velilskoye Settlement of Maryovsky District
- Zarechye, Novgorodsky District, Novgorod Oblast, a village under the administrative jurisdiction of Proletarskoye Settlement of Novgorodsky District
- Zarechye, Okulovsky District, Novgorod Oblast, a village in Berezovikskoye Settlement of Okulovsky District
- Zarechye, Pestovsky District, Novgorod Oblast, a village in Bogoslovskoye Settlement of Pestovsky District
- Zarechye, Poddorsky District, Novgorod Oblast, a village in Seleyevskoye Settlement of Poddorsky District
- Zarechye, Shimsky District, Novgorod Oblast, a village in Medvedskoye Settlement of Shimsky District
- Zarechye, Soletsky District, Novgorod Oblast, a village in Gorskoye Settlement of Soletsky District
- Zarechye, Starorussky District, Novgorod Oblast, a village in Velikoselskoye Settlement of Starorussky District
- Zarechye, Gorskoye Settlement, Volotovsky District, Novgorod Oblast, a village in Gorskoye Settlement of Volotovsky District
- Zarechye, Slavitinskoye Settlement, Volotovsky District, Novgorod Oblast, a village in Slavitinskoye Settlement of Volotovsky District

== Novosibirsk Oblast ==
As of 2010, one rural locality in Novosibirsk Oblast bears this name:

- Zarechye, Novosibirsk Oblast, a selo in Vengerovsky District

== Oryol Oblast ==
As of 2010, six rural localities in Oryol Oblast bear this name:

- Zarechye, Korsakovsky District, Oryol Oblast, a village in Korsakovsky Selsoviet of Korsakovsky District
- Zarechye, Kromskoy District, Oryol Oblast, a village in Koroskovsky Selsoviet of Kromskoy District
- Zarechye, Mtsensky District, Oryol Oblast, a settlement in Spassko-Lutovinovsky Selsoviet of Mtsensky District
- Zarechye, Novosilsky District, Oryol Oblast, a selo in Zarechensky Selsoviet of Novosilsky District
- Zarechye, Orlovsky District, Oryol Oblast, a settlement in Troitsky Selsoviet of Orlovsky District
- Zarechye, Sverdlovsky District, Oryol Oblast, a settlement in Nikolsky Selsoviet of Sverdlovsky District

== Pskov Oblast ==
As of 2010, seventeen rural localities in Pskov Oblast bear this name:

- Zarechye, Bezhanitsky District, Pskov Oblast, a village in Bezhanitsky District
- Zarechye, Dedovichsky District, Pskov Oblast, a village in Dedovichsky District
- Zarechye, Krasnogorodsky District, Pskov Oblast, a village in Krasnogorodsky District
- Zarechye, Loknyansky District, Pskov Oblast, a village in Loknyansky District
- Zarechye, Nevelsky District, Pskov Oblast, a village in Nevelsky District
- Zarechye, Novorzhevsky District, Pskov Oblast, a village in Novorzhevsky District
- Zarechye (Okniyskaya Rural Settlement), Novosokolnichesky District, Pskov Oblast, a village in Novosokolnichesky District; municipally, a part of Okniyskaya Rural Settlement of that district
- Zarechye (Nasvinskaya Rural Settlement), Novosokolnichesky District, Pskov Oblast, a village in Novosokolnichesky District; municipally, a part of Nasvinskaya Rural Settlement of that district
- Zarechye, Plyussky District, Pskov Oblast, a village in Plyussky District
- Zarechye (Tugotinskaya Rural Settlement), Porkhovsky District, Pskov Oblast, a village in Porkhovsky District; municipally, a part of Tugotinskaya Rural Settlement of that district
- Zarechye (Pavskaya Rural Settlement), Porkhovsky District, Pskov Oblast, a village in Porkhovsky District; municipally, a part of Pavskaya Rural Settlement of that district
- Zarechye (Dubrovenskaya Rural Settlement), Porkhovsky District, Pskov Oblast, a village in Porkhovsky District; municipally, a part of Dubrovenskaya Rural Settlement of that district
- Zarechye, Pskovsky District, Pskov Oblast, a village in Pskovsky District
- Zarechye (Alolskaya Rural Settlement), Pustoshkinsky District, Pskov Oblast, a village in Pustoshkinsky District; municipally, a part of Alolskaya Rural Settlement of that district
- Zarechye (Gultyayevskaya Rural Settlement), Pustoshkinsky District, Pskov Oblast, a village in Pustoshkinsky District; municipally, a part of Gultyayevskaya Rural Settlement of that district
- Zarechye (Gultyayevskaya Rural Settlement), Pustoshkinsky District, Pskov Oblast, a village in Pustoshkinsky District; municipally, a part of Gultyayevskaya Rural Settlement of that district
- Zarechye, Strugo-Krasnensky District, Pskov Oblast, a village in Strugo-Krasnensky District

== Ryazan Oblast ==
As of 2010, six rural localities in Ryazan Oblast bear this name:

- Zarechye, Korablinsky District, Ryazan Oblast, a settlement in Klyuchansky Rural Okrug of Korablinsky District
- Zarechye, Mikhaylovsky District, Ryazan Oblast, a settlement in Ilyichevsky Rural Okrug of Mikhaylovsky District
- Zarechye, Alexandro-Nevsky District, Ryazan Oblast, a settlement in Mikhalkovsky Rural Okrug of Alexandro-Nevsky District
- Zarechye, Sarayevsky District, Ryazan Oblast, a settlement in Krivsky Rural Okrug of Sarayevsky District
- Zarechye, Spassky District, Ryazan Oblast, a selo in Zarechinsky Rural Okrug of Spassky District
- Zarechye, Ukholovsky District, Ryazan Oblast, a selo in Konoplinsky Rural Okrug of Ukholovsky District

== Samara Oblast ==
As of 2010, two rural localities in Samara Oblast bear this name:

- Zarechye, Kinelsky District, Samara Oblast, a settlement in Kinelsky District
- Zarechye, Koshkinsky District, Samara Oblast, a settlement in Koshkinsky District

== Smolensk Oblast ==
As of 2010, seven rural localities in Smolensk Oblast bear this name:

- Zarechye, Gagarinsky District, Smolensk Oblast, a village in Akatovskoye Rural Settlement of Gagarinsky District
- Zarechye, Khislavichsky District, Smolensk Oblast, a village in Kozhukhovichskoye Rural Settlement of Khislavichsky District
- Zarechye, Pochinkovsky District, Smolensk Oblast, a village in Lysovskoye Rural Settlement of Pochinkovsky District
- Zarechye, Prigoryevskoye Rural Settlement, Roslavlsky District, Smolensk Oblast, a village in Prigoryevskoye Rural Settlement of Roslavlsky District
- Zarechye, Yepishevskoye Rural Settlement, Roslavlsky District, Smolensk Oblast, a village in Yepishevskoye Rural Settlement of Roslavlsky District
- Zarechye, Rudnyansky District, Smolensk Oblast, a village in Lyubavichskoye Rural Settlement of Rudnyansky District
- Zarechye, Ugransky District, Smolensk Oblast, a village in Velikopolyevskoye Rural Settlement of Ugransky District

== Tambov Oblast ==
As of 2010, four rural localities in Tambov Oblast bear this name:

- Zarechye, Bondarsky District, Tambov Oblast, a settlement in Kershinsky Selsoviet of Bondarsky District
- Zarechye, Pichayevsky District, Tambov Oblast, a selo in Yegorovsky Selsoviet of Pichayevsky District
- Zarechye, Sosnovsky District, Tambov Oblast, a village in Perkinsky Selsoviet of Sosnovsky District
- Zarechye, Tambovsky District, Tambov Oblast, a settlement in Tatanovsky Selsoviet of Tambovsky District

== Republic of Tatarstan ==
As of 2010, one rural locality in the Republic of Tatarstan bears this name:

- Zarechye, Republic of Tatarstan, a settlement in Aznakayevsky District

== Tver Oblast ==
As of 2010, twenty-three rural localities in Tver Oblast bear this name:

- Zarechye, Bezhetsky District, Tver Oblast, a village in Bezhetsky District
- Zarechye, Firovsky District, Tver Oblast, a village in Firovsky District
- Zarechye (Kulitskoye Rural Settlement), Kalininsky District, Tver Oblast, a village in Kalininsky District; municipally, a part of Kulitskoye Rural Settlement of that district
- Zarechye (Turginovskoye Rural Settlement), Kalininsky District, Tver Oblast, a village in Kalininsky District; municipally, a part of Turginovskoye Rural Settlement of that district
- Zarechye, Kalyazinsky District, Tver Oblast, a village in Kalyazinsky District
- Zarechye, Kashinsky District, Tver Oblast, a village in Kashinsky District
- Zarechye, Konakovsky District, Tver Oblast, a village in Konakovsky District
- Zarechye, Lesnoy District, Tver Oblast, a village in Lesnoy District
- Zarechye, Maksatikhinsky District, Tver Oblast, a khutor in Maksatikhinsky District
- Zarechye, Molokovsky District, Tver Oblast, a village in Molokovsky District
- Zarechye, Ostashkovsky District, Tver Oblast, a village in Ostashkovsky District
- Zarechye, Ostashkovsky District, Tver Oblast, a village in Ostashkovsky District
- Zarechye, Penovsky District, Tver Oblast, a village in Penovsky District
- Zarechye, Rameshkovsky District, Tver Oblast, a village in Rameshkovsky District
- Zarechye, Sandovsky District, Tver Oblast, a village in Sandovsky District
- Zarechye, Selizharovsky District, Tver Oblast, a village in Selizharovsky District
- Zarechye, Sonkovsky District, Tver Oblast, a village in Sonkovsky District
- Zarechye, Staritsky District, Tver Oblast, a village in Staritsky District
- Zarechye (Ploskoshskoye Rural Settlement), Toropetsky District, Tver Oblast, a village in Toropetsky District; municipally, a part of Ploskoshskoye Rural Settlement of that district
- Zarechye (Vasilevskoye Rural Settlement), Toropetsky District, Tver Oblast, a village in Toropetsky District; municipally, a part of Vasilevskoye Rural Settlement of that district
- Zarechye, Torzhoksky District, Tver Oblast, a village in Torzhoksky District
- Zarechye, Vyshnevolotsky District, Tver Oblast, a village in Vyshnevolotsky District
- Zarechye, Zapadnodvinsky District, Tver Oblast, a village in Zapadnodvinsky District

== Vladimir Oblast ==
As of 2010, two rural localities in Vladimir Oblast bear this name:

- Zarechye, Kirzhachsky District, Vladimir Oblast, a selo in Kirzhachsky District
- Zarechye, Selivanovsky District, Vladimir Oblast, a village in Selivanovsky District

== Vologda Oblast ==
As of 2010, nineteen rural localities in Vologda Oblast bear this name:

- Zarechye, Babayevsky District, Vologda Oblast, a village in Pyazhozersky Selsoviet of Babayevsky District
- Zarechye, Korotovsky Selsoviet, Cherepovetsky District, Vologda Oblast, a village in Korotovsky Selsoviet of Cherepovetsky District
- Zarechye, Nikolo-Ramensky Selsoviet, Cherepovetsky District, Vologda Oblast, a village in Nikolo-Ramensky Selsoviet of Cherepovetsky District
- Zarechye, Minkinsky Selsoviet, Gryazovetsky District, Vologda Oblast, a village in Minkinsky Selsoviet of Gryazovetsky District
- Zarechye, Pokrovsky Selsoviet, Gryazovetsky District, Vologda Oblast, a village in Pokrovsky Selsoviet of Gryazovetsky District
- Zarechye, Vederkovsky Selsoviet, Gryazovetsky District, Vologda Oblast, a village in Vederkovsky Selsoviet of Gryazovetsky District
- Zarechye, Vederkovsky Selsoviet, Gryazovetsky District, Vologda Oblast, a village in Vederkovsky Selsoviet of Gryazovetsky District
- Zarechye, Kichmengsko-Gorodetsky District, Vologda Oblast, a village in Trofimovsky Selsoviet of Kichmengsko-Gorodetsky District
- Zarechye, Charozersky Selsoviet, Kirillovsky District, Vologda Oblast, a village in Charozersky Selsoviet of Kirillovsky District
- Zarechye, Goritsky Selsoviet, Kirillovsky District, Vologda Oblast, a village in Goritsky Selsoviet of Kirillovsky District
- Zarechye, Nikolo-Torzhsky Selsoviet, Kirillovsky District, Vologda Oblast, a village in Nikolo-Torzhsky Selsoviet of Kirillovsky District
- Zarechye, Mezhdurechensky District, Vologda Oblast, a village in Nozemsky Selsoviet of Mezhdurechensky District
- Zarechye, Nyuksensky District, Vologda Oblast, a village in Bobrovsky Selsoviet of Nyuksensky District
- Zarechye, Sheksninsky District, Vologda Oblast, a village in Charomsky Selsoviet of Sheksninsky District
- Zarechye, Dvinitsky Selsoviet, Sokolsky District, Vologda Oblast, a village in Dvinitsky Selsoviet of Sokolsky District
- Zarechye, Zamoshsky Selsoviet, Sokolsky District, Vologda Oblast, a village in Zamoshsky Selsoviet of Sokolsky District
- Zarechye, Ilezsky Selsoviet, Tarnogsky District, Vologda Oblast, a village in Ilezsky Selsoviet of Tarnogsky District
- Zarechye, Markushevsky Selsoviet, Tarnogsky District, Vologda Oblast, a village in Markushevsky Selsoviet of Tarnogsky District
- Zarechye, Ust-Kubinsky District, Vologda Oblast, a village in Bogorodsky Selsoviet of Ust-Kubinsky District

== Voronezh Oblast ==
As of 2010, three rural localities in Voronezh Oblast bear this name:

- Zarechye, Khokholsky District, Voronezh Oblast, a khutor in Yablochenskoye Rural Settlement of Khokholsky District
- Zarechye, Repyovsky District, Voronezh Oblast, a khutor in Skoritskoye Rural Settlement of Repyovsky District
- Zarechye, Ternovsky District, Voronezh Oblast, a settlement in Kostino-Otdelskoye Rural Settlement of Ternovsky District

== Yaroslavl Oblast ==
As of 2010, nine rural localities in Yaroslavl Oblast bear this name:

- Zarechye, Borisoglebsky District, Yaroslavl Oblast, a village in Demyanovsky Rural Okrug of Borisoglebsky District
- Zarechye, Danilovsky District, Yaroslavl Oblast, a village in Trofimovsky Rural Okrug of Danilovsky District
- Zarechye, Gavrilov-Yamsky District, Yaroslavl Oblast, a selo in Ilyinsky Rural Okrug of Gavrilov-Yamsky District
- Zarechye, Fatyanovsky Rural Okrug, Rostovsky District, Yaroslavl Oblast, a village in Fatyanovsky Rural Okrug of Rostovsky District
- Zarechye, Novo-Nikolsky Rural Okrug, Rostovsky District, Yaroslavl Oblast, a village in Novo-Nikolsky Rural Okrug of Rostovsky District
- Zarechye, Perovsky Rural Okrug, Rostovsky District, Yaroslavl Oblast, a village in Perovsky Rural Okrug of Rostovsky District
- Zarechye, Ugodichsky Rural Okrug, Rostovsky District, Yaroslavl Oblast, a village in Ugodichsky Rural Okrug of Rostovsky District
- Zarechye, Rybinsky District, Yaroslavl Oblast, a village in Pogorelsky Rural Okrug of Rybinsky District
- Zarechye, Uglichsky District, Yaroslavl Oblast, a village in Ploskinsky Rural Okrug of Uglichsky District
