= Malinovka, Russia =

Malinovka (Russian: Малиновка) is the name of several rural localities in Russia:

- Malinovka, Aleysky District, Altai Krai, a selo in Malinovsky Selsoviet of Aleysky District
- Malinovka, Bureysky District, Amur Oblast, a selo in Malinovsky Selsoviet of Bureysky District

== See also ==
- Malinovka River (disambiguation)
- Malinovka (disambiguation)
