= Mostovoye =

Mostovoye may refer to:

- Mostovoye (Amur Oblast), a village in Belogorsky District, Amur Oblast
- Mostovoye (Crimea), a village in Bakhchisaray District, Crimea
- Mostovoye, Kaliningrad Oblast, a village in Slavsky District, Kaliningrad Oblast
- Former name of Mostovskoy, Krasnodar Krai
- Mostovoye (lake), a lake in Altai Krai
