= List of shipwrecks in October 1879 =

The list of shipwrecks in October 1879 includes ships sunk, foundered, grounded, or otherwise lost during October 1879.

== 1 October ==
List of shipwrecks: 1 October 1879
Ship	State	Description
Despatch	United Kingdom	The Mersey Flat was holed by her anchor and sank at Liverpool, Lancashire. She was refloated.
Gothland	United Kingdom	The steamship was driven ashore on Vlieland, Friesland, Netherlands. She was on a voyage from Hamburg, Germany to Liverpool, Lancashire. She was later refloated and resumed her voyage.
Primrose	United Kingdom	The schooner was driven ashore and wrecked in the Larne Lough.
Telford	United Kingdom	The steamship departed from New York, United States for the River Tyne. No further trace, presumed foundered with the loss of all 80 people on board.
Zampa	United Kingdom	The ship departed from Cherbourg, Manche, France for Bari, Italy. No further trace, reported overdue.

== 2 October ==
For the loss of the Swedish tug Gävle on this date, see the entry for 30 September 1879.

List of shipwrecks: 2 October 1879
Ship	State	Description
Ann and Sarah	United Kingdom	The schooner collided with the steamship Blenheim (United Kingdom) and sank in the English Channel off Hastings, Sussex. Her crew were rescued by Blenheim. Ann and Sarah was on a voyage from Ryde, Isle of Wight to Hartlepool, County Durham.
Condor	Germany	The barque ran aground at Gothenburg, Sweden and became waterlogged. She was later refloated and taken in to Gothenburg.
Florence Nightingale	United Kingdom	The ship ran aground on the North Bank, in the Irish Sea off the coast of County Dublin.
Gyds	United Kingdom	The ship was driven ashore at Stornoway, Isle of Lewis. She was on a voyage from Arkhangelsk, Russia to Bridgwater, Somerset. She was refloated and beached.
Kestrel	United Kingdom	The steamship was driven ashore on Vlieland, Friesland, Netherlands. She was refloated with assistance and resumed her voyage.
Walrus	United Kingdom	The steam yacht struck a sunken rock off Jersey, Channel Islands and was holed. She put in to Cherbourg, Manche, France.
Sir Sidney	United Kingdom	The Mersey Flat was wrecked in Kirkcudbright Bay. Her crew were rescued. She was on a voyage from Liverpool to Peel, Isle of Man.

== 3 October ==
List of shipwrecks: 3 October 1879
Ship	State	Description
Alert	Norway	The barque foundered in the Atlantic Ocean.
Alfred the Great	United Kingdom	The ship ran aground in the Belfast Lough. She was refloated the next day and taken in to Belfast, County Antrim.
Alice	Norway	The ship was discovered 7 nautical miles (13 km) south east of Cape San Antonio, Cuba by Tutu (Flag unknown). Alice was on a voyage from Liverpool, Lancashire, United Kingdom to Havana, Cuba. She was taken in to Belize City, British Honduras on 10 October.
Carrie F. Butler	United States	The schooner was wrecked at North Rustico, Prince Edward Island, Canada. Her crew were rescued, along with 300 barrels of Mackerel.
Queen	United Kingdom	The barque ran aground in the Clyde at Greenock, Renfrewshire.

== 4 October ==
List of shipwrecks: 4 October 1879
Ship	State	Description
HMS Achilles	Royal Navy	The frigate collided with HMS Alexandra (Royal Navy) at Cyprus and was damaged.
Alfred et Marguerite	France	The ship was driven ashore at Saint-Malo, Ille-et-Vilaine. She was on a voyage from Saint-Malo to Liverpool, Lancashire, United Kingdom.
Celtic Monarch	United Kingdom	The steamship ran aground at Singapore, Straits Settlements. She was on a voyage from Yokohama, Japan to London. She was refloated and resumed her voyavge.
Centurion	United Kingdom	The ship ran aground at Alicante, Spain. She was on a voyage from Cardiff, Glamorgan to Alicante. She was refloated.
Dawdon	United Kingdom	The steamship ran aground in the Sulina branch of the Danube. She was refloated.
Wesselina	Germany	The schooner was abandoned at sea. Her crew were rescued by the steamship Kingmoor (United Kingdom). Wesselina was on a voyage from Härnösand, Sweden to Bremen.

== 5 October ==
List of shipwrecks: 5 October 1879
Ship	State	Description
Alma	United Kingdom	The ship was driven ashore on Bogskär, Grand Duchy of Finland. She was later refloated and put in to Turku, Grand Duchy of Finland, where she arrived on 8 October in a leaky condition.
Brodick Castle	United Kingdom	The steamship was driven ashore at Corrygill, Isle of Arran. She was refloated and resumed her voyage.
Czar	United Kingdom	The steamship ran aground at Souter Point, County Durham. She was on a voyage from Hull, Yorkshire to Sunderland, County Durham. She was refloated on 7 October and towed in to Sunderland.
Joseph Pease	United Kingdom	The steamship departed from New York for the River Tyne. No further trace, reported missing.

== 6 October ==
List of shipwrecks: 6 October 1879
Ship	State	Description
Betje Bronck	Germany	The schooner foundered in the Baltic Sea off Domesnes, Courland Governorate. Her crew survived.
Cesaria	United Kingdom	The ship ran aground in the Hooghly River. She was on a voyage from Calcutta, India to Dundee, Forfarshire. She was refloated and resumed her voyage.
Intrepid	United Kingdom	The schooner was driven ashore and wrecked near the Corsewall Lighthouse, Wigtownshire. Her crew survived. She was on a voyage from Ayr to Wexford.
Inventor	United Kingdom	The ship caught fire at Liverpool, Lancashire. The fire was extinguished.
Kersland	United Kingdom	The schooner departed from Seville, Spain for Antwerp, Belgium. No further trace, presumed foundered with the loss of all hands.
Pepa	Spain	The ship struck a submerged object at Maranhão, Brazil and was beached. She was on a voyage from Málaga to Montevideo, Uruguay.
Rival	(United Kingdom of Great Britain and Ireland) Jersey	The sloop struck the Willows Rock, in Mounts Bay and sank. Her crew survived. She was on a voyage from Newport, Monmouthshire to Jersey.

== 7 October ==
List of shipwrecks: 7 October 1879
Ship	State	Description
Arabian	United Kingdom	The steamship ran ashore in Bull Bay, Anglesey. She was on a voyage from Liverpool, Lancashire to Genoa, Italy. She was refloated the next day and resumed her voyage.
Black Diamond	United Kingdom	The steamship ran aground off Garmoyle, County Antrim. She was refloated.
Heiress	United Kingdom	The steamship ran aground at Villareal, Spain. She was on a voyage from Villareal to Brazil. She was refloated.
Helvetia	United Kingdom	The ship was abandoned in a sinking condition 7 nautical miles (13 km) off the Norwegian coast. Her crew were rescued. She was on a voyage from Portsoy, Banffshire to Leith, Lothian.
Hermod	United Kingdom	The ship was driven ashore in Silloth Bay, Cumberland. She was on a voyage from New York, United States to Maryport, Cumberland. She was refloated.
Integrity	United Kingdom	The tug was run into by the steamship John Sterling (United Kingdom) and sank in the Firth of Forth. Her seven crew were rescued by John Sterling.
Kate	United Kingdom	The schooner was run into by the tug Stormcock (United Kingdom) and sank in the Irish Sea 10 nautical miles (19 km) west of the South Stack, Anglesey. Her five crew were rescued.

== 8 October ==
List of shipwrecks: 8 October 1879
Ship	State	Description
De Beurs	Netherlands	The ship was driven ashore at "Swolferoet", Norway. Her crew were rescued. She was on a voyage from Riga, Russia to the Nieuwe Diep.
Halswell	United Kingdom	The schooner was driven ashore at Cemlyn, Anglesey. She was refloated and resumed her voyage.
Italia	United Kingdom	The steamship ran aground off Garmoyle, County Antrim.
Martha	United Kingdom	The Mersey Flat collided with the steamship Times (United Kingdom) and sank in the River Mersey at Liverpool.
North-Eastern	United Kingdom	The steamship ran aground off Garmoyle.
Princess Alexandra	United Kingdom	The ship was driven ashore in the Belfast Lough. She was on a voyage from the Clyde to Belfast, County Antrim.
Racoon	United Kingdom	The steamship ran aground off Garmoyle.
Ravenscraig	United Kingdom	The whaler, a steamship, was lost in the Davis Strait off Cape Aston, North West Territory, Canada. Her crew were rescued.
Ruperra	United Kingdom	The steamship ran aground in the River Lee.
Richard Anning	United Kingdom	The steamship ran aground in the Bute Channel. She was on a voyage from Cardiff, Glamorgan to Palermo, Sicily, Italy.
W. N. H. Clements	Canada	The ship ran aground at New York, United States. She was on a voyage from New York to Porto, Portugal. She was refloated and put back to Porto in a leaky condition.

== 9 October ==
List of shipwrecks: 9 October 1879
Ship	State	Description
Afton	United Kingdom	The steamship was driven ashore at Grey Point, County Antrim. She was on a voyage from Garston, Lancashire to Belfast, County Antrim.
Elpe	United Kingdom	The ship ran aground on the Porter Shoal. She was ohn a voyage from Odesa, Russia to Venice, Italy.
Emerald	United Kingdom	The barquentine was driven ashore on Puffin Island, Anglesey. She was on a voyage from Whitehaven, Cumberland to Liverpool, Lancashire.
Emilie	France	The steamship ran aground in the Loire. She was on a voyage from Nantes, Loire-Inférieure to Bristol, Gloucestershire, United Kingdom. She was refloated and put back to Nantes for repairs.
Marguerite	France	The barque was run into by the steamship Hutton (United Kingdom) and sank at Havre de Grâce, Seine-Inférieure.
Vater Gerhard	Germany	The barque collided with the schooner Hans Fode (Norway) in the Elbe and was severely damaged. Vater Gerhard was on a voyage from Hamburg to Philadelphia, Pennsylvania, United States. She put back to Hamburg.

== 10 October ==
List of shipwrecks: 10 October 1879
Ship	State	Description
Edendale	United Kingdom	The steamship ran aground off Brook, Isle of Wight. She was on a voyage from Almería, Spain to London. Edendale was refloated the next day with assistance from the steam lighters Admiralty and Lightning (both United Kingdom) and taken in to West Cowes, Isle of Wight.
Hugh Sleigh	United Kingdom	The steamship ran aground in the Danube downstream of Tulcea, United Principalities. She was refloated on 12 October and resumed her voyage.
Mount Wollaston	United States	The 325-ton whaling bark was lost with all hands at Herald Island in the Chukchi Sea off the coast of Siberia.
Vigilant	United States	Carrying a crew of about 30, the 215-ton whaling bark was lost with all hands when ice stove in her hull in the Chukchi Sea off the coast of Siberia about 25 nautical miles (46 km; 29 mi) southwest of Herald Island.

== 11 October ==
List of shipwrecks: 11 October 1879
Ship	State	Description
Amcott	United Kingdom	The steamship ran aground at Gislöv, Sweden. She was on a voyage from South Shields, County Durham to Kronstadt, Russia. She was refloated and resumed her voyage.
Dart	United Kingdom	The ketch ran aground at West Cowes, Isle of Wight. She was on a voyage from South Shields to West Cowes.

== 12 October ==
List of shipwrecks: 12 October 1879
Ship	State	Description
Ayton	United Kingdom	The steamship was driven ashore in the Bahamas. She was on a voyage from New Orleans, Louisiana, United States to Rouen, Seine-Inférieure, France. She was refloated and resumed her voyage.
Coral Queen	United Kingdom	The steamship was driven ashore at Redcar, Yorkshire. She was on a voyage from Gothenburg, Sweden to West Hartlepool, County Durham. She was refloated with the assistance of three tugs and taken in to West Hartlepool.
Maria	(Russian Empire) Grand Duchy of Finland	The ship was driven ashore on the Swedish coast and sank.
Mount Stewart	United Kingdom	The steamship ran aground near Landskrona, Sweden. She was refloated and taken in to Malmö, Sweden for repairs.
Olive Branch	United Kingdom	The schooner was wrecked in the Bahamas. She was on a voyage from Nassau, Bahamas to New York, United States.

== 13 October ==
List of shipwrecks: 13 October 1879
Ship	State	Description
Elsie Ker	United Kingdom	The steamship collided with North Devon (United Kingdom) and was beached between Quillebeuf-sur-Seine, Manche and Villequier, Seine-Inférieure, France. She was on a voyage from New York, United States to Rouen, Seine-Inférieure. She was refloated and taken in to Rouen.
Memling	Norway	The schooner ran aground at Libava, Courland Governorate. She was refloated and found to be leaky.
Pohono	Canada	The barque was wrecked on Grand Bahama, Bahamas. Her crew were rescued.
Royalist	United Kingdom	The ship, a floating police station, was run into by the steamship Palmyra (United Kingdom) at the Isle of Dogs, Middlesex and was damaged.

== 14 October ==
List of shipwrecks: 14 October 1879
Ship	State	Description
Anna	Sweden	The barque was driven ashore at "Hanero". She was on a voyage from Sundsvall to Rouen, Seine-Inférieure, France.
Carl	Sweden	The brig was driven ashore and capsized at Pori, Grand Duchy of Finland.
Clifford	United Kingdom	The whaler, a brig, was wrecked on Graciosa, Azores.
Flower of Yarrow	United Kingdom	The ship ran aground and was wrecked 9 nautical miles (17 km) from Toli-Toli, Netherlands East Indies. Her crew survived. She was on a voyage from Singapore, Straits Settlements to Toli-Toli.
Hebe	United Kingdom	The coal hulk sprang a leak and sank in the North Sea, Both crew were rescued by the tug Ganges (United Kingdom), which was towing her from Hartlepool, County Durham to Whitby, Yorkshire.
Lidskjolf	Norway	The barque struck the Patterson Rock and was wrecked. Her crew were rescued. She was on a voyage from Dublin, United Kingdom to Copenhagen, Denmark.
Nepthis	United Kingdom	The steamship was damaged by fire at Alexandria, Egypt.
Princessen Louisa	Germany	The ship was wrecked at "Norra Quakin", Sweden.
Rival	United Kingdom	The schooner was wrecked at Bolderāja, Russia with some loss of life.
Solide	Sweden	The ship was driven ashore in Åland, Grand Duchy of Finland. She was on a voyage from Sundsvall to Grimsby, Lincolnshire, United Kingdom.
Souter Johnny	United Kingdom	The lighter foundered off West Hartlepool, County Durham. All four people on board were rescued by the tug William (United Kingdom). Souter Johnny was on a voyage from West Hartlepool to Stockton-on-Tees, County Durham.
Villa Franca	Spain	The ship was driven ashore at Cromer, Norfolk, United Kingdom. She was on a voyage from the River Tyne to Cartagena. She became a wreck the next day and was abandoned by her crew.
Witch of the Teign	United Kingdom	The ship ran aground at Stromness, Orkney Islands. She was on a voyage from Arkhangelsk, Russia to Sharpness, Gloucestershire. She was refloated the next day and found to be leaky.
349, 466, and 549	Russia	The lighters sank at Kronstadt.

== 15 October ==
List of shipwrecks: 15 October 1879
Ship	State	Description
Ann Goodhalgh	United Kingdom	The ketch collided with the steamship Balmoral Castle (United Kingdom) and sank off Cromer, Norfolk. Her crew were rescued by Balmoral Castle. Ann Goodhalgh was on a voyage from Chichester, Sussex to Hartlepool, County Durham.
August	United Kingdom	The sloop was driven ashore at Lydd, Kent.
Constance	United Kingdom	The schooner ran aground on the Doom Bar. She was on a voyage from Demerara, British Guiana to Porthcawl, Glamorgan. She was refloated and towed in to Padstow, Cornwall.
Lively Lass	United Kingdom	The ship ran aground at the mouth of the River Mersey and sprang a leak. She was on a voyage from Fécamp, Seine-Inférieure, France to Liverpool, Lancashire.
Messenger	United Kingdom	The ship struck a rock and sank off Ramsey, Isle of Man. Her five crew were rescued. She was on a voyage from Teignmouth, Devon to Runcorn, Cheshire.
Oscar	Norway	The brig was driven ashore at Cap Arcona, Germany. She was refloated with the assistance of the steamship Seguens (Germany) and towed in to Swinemünde in a waterlogged condition.
Santa Maria	Spain	The steamship struck Bales Rock, Vitória, Brazil off and was wrecked. All on board were rescued.

== 16 October ==
List of shipwrecks: 16 October 1879
Ship	State	Description
Augusta	Germany	The ship caught fire and sank 2 nautical miles (3.7 km) off Ystad, Sweden. Her crew were rescued. She was on a voyage from Saint Petersburg, Russia to Copenhagen, Denmark.
Betty Allan	United Kingdom	The fishing trawler was driven ashore and sank at Aberdeen.
Cito	Denmark	The brigantine ran aground at the mouth of the Rio Grande. She was on a voyage from Liverpool, Lancashire, United Kingdom to the Rio Grande.
Devonia	United Kingdom	The steamship ran aground in the Clyde. She was on a voyage from the Clyde to New York, United States.
Ella Mary	United Kingdom	The schooner was run into by the steamship Electric (United Kingdom) and sank in Liverpool Bay off the Formby Lightship ( Trinity House) with the loss of one of her four crew. Survivors were rescued by Electric. Ella Mary was on a voyage from Rouen, Seine-Inférieure, France to Runcorn, Cheshire.
Gleaner	United Kingdom	The pilot boat ran aground off the mouth of the River Usk and was severely damaged.
Louis	France	The barque was driven ashore at Indramayu, Netherlands East Indies. She was on a voyage from Cheribon, Java, Netherlands East Indies to the English Channel. She was refloated on 24 October.
Nereid	United Kingdom	The schooner was driven ashore at "Aushuwell". She was on a voyage from Antwerp, Belgium to London.
Presto	United Kingdom	The ship ran aground in the Nieuwe Diep. She was on a voyage from the River Tyne to the Nieuwe Diep.
Sparkling Foam	United Kingdom	The brigantine was driven ashore at Whitstable, Kent. She was refloated with assistance on 18 October.
T. C. Jones	United States	The barque was wrecked at Villaricos, Spain. Her crew were rescued. She was on a voyage from Barcelona, Spain to New York.
Tom Williams	United States	The ship ran aground in the Pará River. She was on a voyage from New York to Pará, Brazil. She was refloated and taken in to Pará.

== 17 October ==
List of shipwrecks: 17 October 1879
Ship	State	Description
Alarm	United Kingdom	The luggage boat was run into by HMS Britomart (Royal Navy) at Portsmouth, Hampshire and was severely damaged. She was on a voyage from Portsmouth to Ryde, Isle of Wight.
Ardanach	United Kingdom	The ship steamship ran aground in the River Thames at Blackwall, Middlesex whilst avoiding a collision with another vessel. She was refloated.
Aurora	Sweden	The ship foundered in the Baltic Sea off Saaremaa, Russia. Her crew were rescued. She was on a voyage from Copenhagen, Denmark to Vyborg, Grand Duchy of Finland.
Carnsew	United Kingdom	The schooner foundered off the Isle of Arran. Her crew were rescued by the tug Flying Sylph (United Kingdom). Carnsew was on a voyage from Castlehill to Greenock, Renfrewshire.
Cutelin dell'Orso	Italy	The barque ran aground on the Brigantine Shoals, near Life Saving Station No. 28, 4th District on the New Jersey coast. She was refloated on 22 October.
Dryad	United Kingdom	The ship was run into by Ocean Star (United Kingdom) in Bangor Bay and was severely damaged.
Faith	United Kingdom	The ketch was driven ashore and wrecked at Eyemouth, Berwickshire. Her crew were rescued. She was on a voyage from the Firth of Forth to Burnmouth, Berwickshire.
Lady Elsa	United Kingdom	The steam yacht was driven ashore at Applecross, Ross-shire.
Leila	United Kingdom	The brigantine was driven ashore at Orbost, Isle of Skye, Outer Hebrides.
Midas	United States	The ship was driven ashore and wrecked at San Antonio, Chile, She was on a voyage from Boston, Massachusetts to Valparaíso, Chile.
Roland	Germany	The steamship ran aground at Maassluis, South Holland, Netherlands. She was on a voyage from Liepāja, Russia to Maassluis. She was refloated and taken in to Maassluis.
Sarah	United Kingdom	The Mersey Flat was beached at Rhyl, Denbighshire. She was on a voyage from Holyhead, Anglesey to Widnes, Cheshire. She was a total loss.
Sarah Burnyeat	Western Australia	The ship was driven ashore at Vasse.
Solafide	Norway	The barque ran aground off Seaton Point. She was on a voyage from Queenstown, County Cork to Liverpool, Lancashire, United Kingdom.

== 18 October ==
List of shipwrecks: 18 October 1879
Ship	State	Description
Alfonso	United Kingdom	The steamship foundered 19 nautical miles (35 km) north east by east of Great Yarmouth, Norfolk. Her eleven crew were rescued by the smack Princess (United Kingdom). Alfonso was on a voyage from Aarhus, Denmark to Ipswich, Suffolk.
Ane Catherine	Denmark	The brig collided with the troopship HMS Himalaya (Royal Navy) and was severely damaged. Ane Catherine was on a voyage from Lagos, Lagos Colony to Marseille, Bouches-du-Rhône, France. She was towed in to Gibraltar by HMS Himalaya.
Antoinetta Costa	Italy	The ship ran aground on the Brigantine Shoals. She was on a voyage from Genoa to New York. She was refloated with assistance.
Aura	(Russian Empire) Grand Duchy of Finland	The brig collided with the steamship Bride (United Kingdom) in the Baltic Sea. Aura was on a voyage from a Baltic port to Hull, Yorkshire, United Kingdom. She put in to Gothenburg, Sweden in a waterlogged condition.
Bayard	United Kingdom	The barque was driven ashore at Tacumshane, County Wexford, United Kingdom. Her crew were rescued by rocket apparatus. She was on a voyage from New York, United States to Greenore, County Wexford. She had become a wreck by 20 October.
Fanny	United Kingdom	The brig struck the pier at Ayr and was damaged. She was on a voyage form Belfast, County Antrim to Ayr.
Garibaldi	United Kingdom	The Mersey Flat was holed by her anchor and sank in the River Mersey.
Gican	United Kingdom	The schooner ran aground in the Larne Lough.
Leone	Austria-Hungary	The barque was destroyed by fire at Alexandria, Egypt.
Nuevo Pajano del Oceano	(Spain) Cuba	The steamship caught fire while en route from Havana to Nuevitas and sank in the Old Bahama Channel. Seventeen people were rescued by the steamship Louise H. (United Kingdom), but 42 people died.
Superb	United Kingdom	The paddle tug was driven ashore and wrecked at Cairnbulg, Aberdeenshire. Her six crew were rescued by Rubie (United Kingdom). Superb was on a voyage from Liverpool, Lancashire to Sunderland, County Durham.

== 19 October ==
List of shipwrecks: 19 October 1879
Ship	State	Description
Alton Tower	United Kingdom	The steamship was driven ashore and wrecked at Lydd, Kent. Her crew were rescued by the Coastguard using rocket apparatus. She was on a voyage from Madras, India to London.
Annie	United Kingdom	The steamship ran aground in the Saint Lawrence River. She was on a voyage from Montreal, Quebec, Canada to Liverpool, Lancashire. She was refloated and taken in to Quebec City.
Fra Francesco	Italy	The barque was driven ashore and severely damaged at Carloforte, Sardinia. She was on a voyage from Genoa to Swansea, Glamorgan, United Kingdom.
Frederick William	(United Kingdom of Great Britain and Ireland) Guernsey	The brig was run into by the steamship Thetis and sank in the River Thames at Tilbury, Essex. Her crew were rescued. Frederick William was on a voyage from Guernsey to London. She was refloated, repaired and taken in to London, where she arrived on 23 October.
Speedwell	United Kingdom	The schooner ran aground on the Newcombe Sand, in the North Sea off the coast o Norfolk. She was on a voyage from Goole, Yorkshire to London. She was refloated and resumed her voyage.
Vibilia	(United Kingdom of Great Britain and Ireland) Guernsey	The brigantine ran aground on The Shingles, off Margate, Kent. She was refloated with the assistance of two tugs and taken in tow for London.
Vitul, and an Unnamed vessel	United Kingdom; France	The schooner Vitula was run into by the steamship Hutton (United Kingdom) at Dunkirk, Nord, France and was severely damaged. Hutton collided with several fishing smacks, sinking one of them.
William C. Webb	United Kingdom	The pilot cutter was driven ashore at the mouth of the River Usk.

== 20 October ==
List of shipwrecks: 20 October 1879
Ship	State	Description
Almina	Sweden	The schooner was driven ashore and wrecked on Skagen, Denmark. Her crew were rescued. She was on a voyage from Blyth, Northumberland, United Kingdom to Nakskov, Denmark.
Carl August	Sweden	The schooner collided with Roska (Russia) and sank off Jylland, Denmark with the loss of a crew member. Survivors were rescued by Roska. Carl August was on a voyage from Middlesbrough, Yorkshire, United Kingdom to Stockholm, Sweden.
P. Caland	Netherlands	The steamship ran aground at Maassluis, South Holland. She was on a voyage from Rotterdam, South Holland to New York, United States. She was refloated and resumed her voyage.
Unnamed	United Kingdom	The fishing smack foundered in the English Channel off Sandsfoot Castle, Dorset with the loss of both crew.

== 21 October ==
List of shipwrecks: 21 October 1879
Ship	State	Description
Andrew Leighton	United States	The fishing schooner departed for the LaHave Bank. No further trace, presumed foundered with the loss of all fourteen or fifteen crew.
Hindostan	United Kingdom	The steamship was driven ashore at Sadras, India. Her passengers were taken off. She was on a voyage from London to Calcutta, India.
Julie	France	The ship was driven ashore on Terschelling, Friesland, Netherland. She was on a voyage from Christiania, Norway to Calais.
S. and Jan	Germany	The barque was wrecked in the Nieuwe Diep. Her crew were rescued. She was on a voyage from London, United Kingdom to Danzig.
Sir Robert	United Kingdom	The ship was driven ashore at Weston Point.

== 22 October ==
List of shipwrecks: 22 October 1879
Ship	State	Description
Antagonist	United Kingdom	The smack caught fire and sank in the North Sea 20 nautical miles (37 km) east by north of Grimsby, Lincolnshire.
Ariadne	Netherlands	The steamship ran aground at Maassluis, South Holland. She was on a voyage from Kronstadt, Russia to Rotterdam, South Holland. She was refloated.
Beech	United Kingdom	The steamship was wrecked on the Tistarne Rock, in the Kattegat. Her crew were rescued. She was on a voyage from Sunderland, County Durham to Kronstadt.
Cato	Netherlands	The brig was abandoned in the North Sea. Her crew were rescued by Germania (Germany). Cato was on a voyage from Riga, Russia to Amsterdam, North Holland. She was towed in to Cuxhaven, Germany on 29 October by the steamship Norden (Sweden).

== 23 October ==
List of shipwrecks: 23 October 1879
Ship	State	Description
Alaska	United Kingdom	The ship departed from New York, United States for Sligo. No further trace, reported severely overdue.
Cicero	United Kingdom	The steamship ran aground between "Kamu Bourbon" and "Takli". She was refloated on 25 October.
Eliza Gerlach	United States	The schooner lost her tow and drifted onto the breakwater at Buffalo, New York near Life Saving Station No. 5, 9th District on the Lake Erie coast. She was scuttled to prevent additional damage. Probably refloated.
Henry Goodling	United Kingdom	The Thames barge was severely damaged by fire at Lowestoft, Suffolk.
Juliet et Cecilia	France	The smack foundered between Ailsa Craig and Pladda. She was on a voyage from Ardrossan, Ayrshire, United Kingdom to Nantes, Loire-Inferieure.
Lena	Germany	The kuff ran aground near Dragør, Denmark. She was on a voyage from Bayonne, Basses-Pyrénées, France to Riga, Russia.
Mathilde	Sweden	The ship was driven ashore near Stockholm.

== 24 October ==
List of shipwrecks: 24 October 1879
Ship	State	Description
Anna Pizzorno	Italy	The ship struck the Tuskar Rock. She was on a voyage from Quebec City, Canada to Liverpool, Lancashire, United Kingdom She was refloated the next day and completed her voyage in a waterlogged condition.
Catarina	Italy	The ship departed from Baltimore, Maryland for Queenstown, County Cork, United Kingdom. No further trace,. reported severely overdue.
Henry Rony	Canada	The schooner sank in 50 feet (15 m) of water off Charlotte, New York, five miles (8.0 km) east of Life Saving Station No. 4, 9th District after springing a leak the day before in wind and a heavy sea. Eight of her crew made it to shore in her yawl, but the female cook, who was asleep in a cabin, was forgotten in the panic to get off and was left to die.
Hermo	United Kingdom	The ship ran aground on the Goodwin Sands, Kent. She was on a voyage from a Baltic port to Gloucester. She was refloated and resumed her voyage.
La Souveraine	France	The steamship was wrecked on the Le Bœuf Rock, off Chausey, Manche.
Lebanon	United Kingdom	The steamship ran aground on the Cross Sands, in the North Sea off the coast of Norfolk. She was on a voyage from Huelva, Spain to the Sunderland, County Durham. She was refloated with the assistance of tugs and boats and resumed her voyage.
Mercury	United States	The 311-ton whaling bark was frozen in the ice and abandoned in the Chukchi Sea near Herald Island off Siberia. All 38 people aboard – 37 crew members and the captain's wife – were rescued by the bark Helen Mar (United States).
Star of Peace	United Kingdom	The full-rigged ship was driven ashore at IJmuiden, North Holland, Netherlands. She was on a voyage from London to Zaandam, North Holland. She was refloated on 25 October.
St. Louis	Canada	The brigantine was driven ashore in Ballycotton Bay. Her crew were rescued. She was on a voyage from Glasgow, Renfrewshire, United Kingdom to Trinidad. She subsequently sank.
445	Russia	The lighter sank at Kronstadt.

== 25 October ==
List of shipwrecks: 25 October 1879
Ship	State	Description
Almuth Catherina	Germany	The ship sank at Varberg, Sweden. Her crew were rescued. She was on a voyage from Leer to Danzig.
Anna and Sophia	Netherlands	The ship was driven ashore on "Karangkoh", Netherlands East Indies. She was refloated and taken in to Passoerang.
Liberator	United Kingdom	The schooner was driven ashore at Pollacheeny, County Sligo. She was on a voyage from Pollacheeny to Glasgow, Renfrewshire.
Louise Marie	Sweden	The ship was driven ashore at Ahr, Gotland. She was on a voyage from Stockholm to an English port.
Pride of the Wear	United Kingdom	The barque ran aground near Sandhamn, Sweden.
Sandsend	United Kingdom	The steamship ran aground off Sprogø, Denmark. She was on a voyage from Hartlepool, County Durham to Wismar, Germany and was damaged. She was refloated and taken in to Copenhagen for repairs.
Trafalgar	United Kingdom	The steamship collided with City of Perth (United Kingdom) and ran aground in the River Mersey. Trafalgar was on a voyage from Savannah, Georgia, United States to Liverpool, Lancashire. She was refloated.
Unnamed	Flag unknown	The steamship was driven ashore at the Point of Carne, County Wexford, United Kingdom. She was refloated and resumed her voyage.
Unnamed	Norway	The barque was driven ashore on Gotland.

== 26 October ==
List of shipwrecks: 26 October 1879
Ship	State	Description
County of Denbigh	United Kingdom	The ship departed from a port in Oregon, United States for the Clyde. No further trace, presumed foundered with the loss of all 30 crew.
Luneburg	Sweden	The ship ran aground at Sunderland, County Durham, United Kingdom. She was on a voyage from Uddevalla to Sunderland. She was refloated.
Magnet	United Kingdom	The ship ran aground off the Mumbles, Glamorgan. She was on a voyage from Swansea, Glamorgan to Porto, Portugal. She was refloated and put back to Swansea in a leaky condition.
Sea Spray	United Kingdom	The barque caught fire and sank in the Atlantic Ocean approximately 240 miles (390 km) from São Vicente, Cape Verde Islands. The crew took to the boats and arrived at São Vicente two days later. She was on a voyage from London to East London, Cape Colony.
Zarioca	Norway	The steamship was driven ashore near "Swygebak", Denmark. She was refloated with assistance.

== 27 October ==
List of shipwrecks: 27 October 1879
Ship	State	Description
Anna Maria	United Kingdom	The ship was driven ashore and sank at Vargö, Sweden.
Atlantic King	United Kingdom	The ship foundered in the Indian Ocean in a cyclone. She was on a voyage from Rangoon, Burma to Negapatam, India.
Bergitte	Denmark	The schooner ran aground at Trekroner. She was on a voyage from Porvoo, Grand Duchy of Finland to Southampton, Hampshire, United Kingdom. She was refloated.
Bernard	United Kingdom	The ship collided with another vessel and sank off Skagen, Denmark.
Fram	Norway	The schooner ran aground near Kastrup, Denmark. She was on a voyage from Stockholm, Sweden to Porto, Portugal. She was refloated and resumed her voyage.
Hauthandel	Germany	The ship was abandoned in the North Sea. Her crew were rescued.
Idalia	United Kingdom	The ship departed from the River Tyne for Stralsund, Germany. No further trace, reported overdue.
Laaland	Norway	The schooner was abandoned off Lista. Her crew were rescued. She was on a voyage from Kragerø to Leith, Lothian, United Kingdom.
Saga	Sweden	The steamship was driven ashore at "Segerstad", Öland, Sweden. She was on a voyage from "Brevig" to Rouen, seine-Inférieure, France. She was refloated on 29 October and taken in to Copenhagen.
Sally	United States	The barque capsized during a gale in the Gulf of Mexico with the loss of six of the eight people on board. Survivors were rescued by the steamer Enrique (Spain) and landed at New Orleans, Louisiana.
Zaritza	Norway	The steamship was driven ashore at Snogebæk. She was on a voyage from Reval, Russia to Stettin, Germany.
Unnamed	United Kingdom	The brigantine ran aground on the Memory Rock, in the Copeland Islands, County Antrim.

== 28 October ==
List of shipwrecks: 28 October 1879
Ship	State	Description
Amazon	United States	The steamship ran aground at Grand Haven, Michigan in a gale, broke in two and was wrecked. Her 32 crew and 36 passengers were rescued by the United States Life Saving Service.
Anna Margaretha	Flag unknown	The ship was driven ashore and wrecked on the Swedish coast.
Bessie Whineray	United Kingdom	The brigantine ran aground on the Deputy Reef. She was on a voyage from Swansea, Glamorgan to Belfast, County Antrim. She was refloated with assistance from the tug Protector (United Kingdom) and taken in to Belfast.
Degeraad de Jonge	Netherlands	The ship was abandoned in the North Sea. Her crew survived. She came ashore on Langeoog, Germany.
Doctor	United Kingdom	The ship ran aground on the Aigue Rock. She was on a voyage from Ayr to Swansea, Glamorgan. She was refloated and taken in to Portaferry, County Down in a leaky condition.
George Bartram	United Kingdom	The brig was driven ashore and wrecked near Mariehamn, Sweden. She was on a voyage from Stockholm to Söderhamn.
Gustav Telberg	Sweden	The steamship was driven ashore at "Port Philippe", Belgium. She was on a voyage from Stockholm to Antwerp, Belgium.
John Paxton	United Kingdom	The ship was driven ashore at Blakeney, Norfolk. She was on a voyage from Sunderland, County Durham to Rotterdam, South Holland, Netherlands. She was refloated and resumed her voyage.
John Pollins	United Kingdom	The schooner ran aground on the Banjaard Sand, in the North Sea off the coast of Zeeland, Netherlands. Her crew were rescued by a Dutch fishing vessel.
Kate	United Kingdom	The ship sprang a leak and was abandoned. Her crew were rescued by a Norwegian brigantine. She was on a voyage from Lisbon, Portugal to Cardiff, Glamorgan.
Lady Stewart	United Kingdom	The ship sprang a leak and was beached at Gravesend, Kent. She was on a voyage from Antwerp, Belgium to London.
Marion	United Kingdom	The steamship ran aground at "Ismail Chatal", United Principalities. She was on a voyage from Brăila, United Principalities to Marseille, Bouches-du-Rhône, France. She was refloated the next day and taken in to Sulina, United Principalities.
Regina	Norway	The barque ran aground on the Potato Garth. She was on a voyage from Fredrikstadt to Sunderland, County Durham, United Kingdom. She was refloated.

== 29 October ==
List of shipwrecks: 29 October 1879
Ship	State	Description
Harvey C. Mackay	United States	The fishing schooner probably sank in a gale on the Georges Bank, she was last seen a few hours before the storm arrived. Lost with all 10 hands.
N. H. Phillips	United States	The fishing schooner was lost on the Bank Qurerau in a gale. Last seen the day before and not seen since. Lost with all 14 crewmen.
Petrel	United States	The whaler, a schooner capsized with the loss of fifteen of her 21 crew. Survivors were rescued on 3 November by the barque Rebus (Austria-Hungary).
Shooting Star	United Kingdom	The barque was abandoned at sea. Her crew were rescued by the barque Longfellow (United Kingdom). Shooting Star was on a voyage from Baltimore, Maryland, United States to a British port.
Syria	France	The steamship ran aground in the Suez Canal.
About 100 unnamed vessels	Flags unknown	The ships were driven ashore on the coasts of New Brunswick, Nova Scotia and Prince Edward Island, Canada, including 70 in the Strait of Canso. Many vessels were wrecked and several lives were lost.

== 30 October ==
List of shipwrecks: 30 October 1879
Ship	State	Description
Annie Marie	United Kingdom	The barque was driven ashore and wrecked at Tamatave, Merina Kingdom with the loss of one life.
Cameroon, and Houssa	United Kingdom	The steamship collided at Freetown, Sierra Leone and were both severely damaged. They were both placed under repair.
Edward	United Kingdom	The Thames barge sank in the Thames Estuary off the Isle of Grain, Kent with the loss of all four people on board. She was on a voyage from Sittingbourne, Kent to London.
Marie Thérèse	France	The schooner was lost off the Île de Sein, Finistère with the loss of eight of the nine people on boatd. The survivor was rescued by Deux Frères. Marie Thérèse was on a voyage from Santander, Spain to Newport, Monmouthshire, United Kingdom.
Nelly	United Kingdom	The schooner was driven ashore and wrecked at "Little Pobo". The wreck was plundered by the local inhabitants.
Royal Charter	Canada	The barque was abandoned at sea. Her crew were rescued by Hermes (Flag unknown). Royal Charter was on a voyage from New York, United States to Antwerp, Belgium. She was subsequently discovered by Glenaros (United Kingdom) which placed some of her crew aboard. Also reported to have been discovered on 6 November by Marie (Norway), which took charge of Royal Charter.
St. Jacques	France	The ship ran aground off Bryher, Isles of Scilly, United Kingdom. She was on a voyage from Havre de Grâce, Seine-Inférieure to Swansea, Glamorgan, United Kingdom. She was refloated and taken in to St. Mary's, Isles of Scilly in a waterlogged condition.
Theoder Reimer	Flag unknown	The ship ran aground at Blyth, Northumberland, United Kingdom. She was refloated.
W. H. Wood	United States	The schooner was driven ashore and wrecked near Unga, Department of Alaska.

== 31 October ==
List of shipwrecks: 31 October 1879
Ship	State	Description
Dannebrog	Denmark	The schooner ran aground in Kalkbrander Bay. She was on a voyage from Oulu, Grand Duchy of Finland to London, United Kingdom.
Nieman	France	The steamship ran aground at the mouth of the Danube.
Unnamed	France	The lighter sank in the Gironde.

== Unknown date ==
List of shipwrecks: Unknown date in October 1879
Ship	State	Description
Adelina & Marianne	Germany	The ship was wrecked at Taiwanfu, Taiwan, China.
Adler	Germany	The brig ran aground off Gjedser, Denmark and sank.
Albert	Norway	The barque sprang a leak and sank in the Atlantic Ocean (41°54′N 36°50′W). Her crew were rescued by Devretti Dubrovachi (Austria-Hungary). Albert was on a voyage from Martinique to Saint-Nazaire, Loire-Inférieure, France.
Amella	Netherlands	The ship was wrecked at Havana, Cuba. Her crew were rescued. She was on a voyage from Cuxhaven, Germany to Mexico.
Andover	United Kingdom	The brigantine was driven ashore on Bere Island, County Cork. She was on a voyage from Liverpool, Lancashire to Limerick. She was refloated and taken in to Castletown, Isle of Man.
Anna	Norway	The barque was driven ashore on Terschelling, Friesland, Netherlands. She was on a voyage from Sweden to Antwerp, Belgium, She was refloated on 25 October and found to be waterlogged.
Anna and Olga	United Kingdom	The schooner was driven ashore on Saltholm, Denmark. She was on a voyage from Hull, Yorkshire, United Kingdom to Riga, Russia. She was refloated on 20 October and resumed her voyage.
Anna Christina	Netherlands	The ship sank in the Zuyder Zee. Her crew were rescued.
Ariadne	Germany	The brig was abandoned off Hirtshals, Denmark. Her crew were rescued by the steamship Jupiter (Flag unknown). Ariadne was on a voyage form Riga to Hartlepool, County Durham, United Kingdom.
A. R. Weeks	United Kingdom	The schooner collided with the steamship Farnley (United Kingdom) and sank at Baltimore, Maryland. She was refloated.
Astopogon	United Kingdom	The ship ran aground on the Hare Island Reef, in the Saint Lawrence River. She was on a voyage from Montreal, Quebec, Canada to Queenstown, County Cork. She was refloated and resumed her voyage.
Augusta	United States	The ship ran aground on the Gangway Rock. She was on a voyage from New York to Lisbon, Portugal. She was refloated and resumed her voyage.
Auguste	Flag unknown	The ship foundered in the Baltic Sea off Ystad, Sweden. She was on a voyage from Saint Petersburg, Russia to Copenhagen, Denmark.
Balmoral	United Kingdom	The steamship was wrecked 11 nautical miles (20 km) north of "N'Diago", Senegal. Her crew were rescued. She was on a voyage from Liverpool to Saint-Louis, Senegal.
Ben McDui	United Kingdom	The steamship ran aground at Tre Kroner, near Copenhagen. She was on a voyage from Danzig, Germany to London. She was refloated and resumed her voyage.
Breeze	United Kingdom	The brig struck the pier at Bridport, Dorset and was damaged. She was on a voyage from Newcastle upon Tyne, Northumberland to Bridport. She was taken in to Bridport in a leaky condition.
Brodick Castle	United Kingdom	The steamship ran ashore at Corriegill, Isle of Arran. She was refloated and taken in to Lamlash.
Christian Agathon	Norway	The brig was driven ashore and wrecked at Rysten, Gräsön, Sweden. She was on a voyage from Gothenburg to Hudiksvall, Sweden.
Confidenza	Italy	The barque was driven ashore. She was on a voyage from Baltimore to Dunkirk, Nord, France. She was refloated and put back to Baltimore.
Devonia	United Kingdom	The steamship ran aground in the Clyde at Garvel Point. She was on a voyage from Glasgow, Renfrewshire to New York.
Diligente	Sweden	The ship was driven ashore and wrecked at Mobile, Alabama, United States. She was on a voyage from Havana to Mobile.
Eleonore von Flotow	Germany	The ship was taken in to Lerwick, Shetland Island, United Kingdom in a waterlogged condition. She was on a voyage from Arkhangelsk, Russia to Bordeaux, Gironde, France.
Ester	Norway	The brig was driven ashore on Skagen, Denmark. Her crew were rescued. She was on a voyage from Great Yarmouth to Sandefjord.
Eugenie Maria	France	The ship was holed by her anchor and sank in the River Towy. She was on a voyage from Nantes, Loire-Inférieure to Carmarthen, United Kingdom.
Garland	United Kingdom	The ship was driven ashore at Leven, Fife.
Gertch Banker	United States	The ship ran aground in the Rio Grande. She was refloated.
Gladiolus	United Kingdom	The barque was wrecked at "Yallaha", Jamaica. Her crew were rescued.
Glencoe	United Kingdom	The steamship was driven ashore at Shanghai, China. She was on a voyage from Japan to Shanghai. She was refloated and taken in to Shanghai.
Harmine	Germany	The schooner was severely damaged by fire in Aalbek Bay. She was on a voyage from Saint Petersburg to Dundee, Forfarshire, United Kingdom. She was taken in to Fredrikshavn, Denmark.
Harriet Brewster	United States	The ship was abandoned in the Atlantic Ocean before 3 October. She was on a voyage from Bordeaux to New York.
Ida	Sweden	The barque ran aground in the Gulf of Bothnia. She was on a voyage from Umeå to Dover, Kent, United Kingdom. She was refloated and put in to Malmö for repairs.
Ida	Russia	The barque was driven ashore at Sangatte, Pas-de-Calais, France.
Ivanhoe	United Kingdom	The ship was wrecked on the coast of Tasmania. Her crew were rescued. She was on a voyage from Melbourne, Melbourne to San Francisco, California, United States.
Julia et Celine	France	The smack foundered in the Firth of Clyde between Ailsa Craig and Pladda. She was on a voyage from Ardrossan, Ayrshire, United Kingdom to Nantes, Loire-Inférieure.
Kong Karl	Norway	The schooner foundered in the North Sea off Schiermonnikoog, Germany between 1 and 14 October. She was on a voyage from Hamburg, Germany to Buenos Aires, Argentina.
Laura	United Kingdom	The brig was wrecked on the Isla de Aves, Venezuela.
Laurence et Melanie	France	The brig was wrecked at the mouth of the Tonalá River before 6 October.
Leopoldine Fraude	Germany	The barque ran aground on the Bredegrunden. She was on a voyage from London to Vyborg, Grand Duchy of Finland.
Lepreaux	United Kingdom	The ship ran aground at Bordeaux. She was on a voyage from New York to Bordeaux. She was refloated.
Luna	United Kingdom	The steamship ran aground and was wrecked at Maassluis, South Holland, Netherlands. Her crew were rescued by the Maassluis Lifeboat. She was on a voyage from Danzig, Germany to Rotterdam, South Holland.
Magnus	Sweden	The schooner ran aground at Mörbylånga, Öland.
Malabar	France	The schooner was driven ashore at Dymchurch, Kent. She was refloated on 24 October.
Margaret Powles	United Kingdom	The smack ran aground on the Maplin Sand, in the North Sea off the coast of Essex.
Marie Amelie	France	The ship was driven ashore and wrecked at "Mananzary", Merina Kingdom.
Marina	United Kingdom	The steamship was driven ashore at New Orleans, Louisiana, United States. She was on a voyage from New Orleans to Liverpool. She was refloated.
Marion	United Kingdom	The schooner was abandoned in the North Sea off the Lemon and Owers Sandbank. Her crew were rescued by the smack Amateur (United Kingdom). Marion was on a voyage from Wisbech, Cambridgeshire to Skellefteå, Sweden.
Marion	United Kingdom	The ship ran aground at "Ismail Chalat".
Martha	Norway	The ship ran aground at "Kinstra", Sweden. She was on a voyage from Skellefteå, Sweden to Dunkirk.
Mathilde Octavie, and an Unnamed vessel	(Canada)	The barque Mathilde Octavie and a tug ran aground in the Saint Lawrence River. Mathilde Octavie was on a voyage from Montreal, Quebec to Buenos Aires, Argentina. She was refloated and resumed her voyage.
Max	United Kingdom	The ship was driven ashore at "Knaehager". She was on a voyage from London to Riga. She was refloated and taken in to Helsingør, Denmark.
Meta	Germany	The ship was driven ashore at Sarkau with the presumed loss of all hands.
Mildred	United Kingdom	The ship was driven ashore at "Cape La Roche", Quebec. She was on a voyage from Montreal to London.
Neva	United Kingdom	The brig was driven ashore on Nexø, Denmark. She was on a voyage from Riga to Dundee, Forfarshire. She was refloated and taken in to Rønne, Denmark for repairs.
Ocean	Norway	The ship was abandoned in the Atlantic Ocean before 31 October.
Orion	Netherlands	The schooner was driven ashore on Skagen, Denmark. Her crew were rescued. She was on a voyage from Riga to Burntisland, Fife.
Paquebot de Quimper	France	The schooner was driven ashore near Étaples, Pas-de-Calais. She was on a voyage from Nantes, Loire-Inferieure to Shoreham-by-Sea, Sussex, United Kingdom.
Paraguay	France	The steamship ran aground at the mouth of the Paraná River.
Peru	Belgium	The ship was driven ashore and wrecked on "Kafcalida Island" with the loss of four of her crew. She was on a voyage from Smyrna, Ottoman Empire to Lisbon.
Prince of Wales	United Kingdom	The ship was driven ashore at Donaghadee, County Down. She was on a voyage from Troon, Ayrshire to Wicklow. She was refloated and taken in to Belfast, County Antrim in a leaky condition.
Rathkenny	United Kingdom	The steamship ran aground on the Ship Rock, off Ballyferris, County Down.
Said	Austria-Hungary	The schooner was driven ashore on Dragør, Denmark. She was refloated and taken in to Copenhagen in a leaky condition.
Sofia	Flag unknown	The ship was driven ashore on "Huidvridskar" and was severely damaged.
Sparrow Hawk	United Kingdom	The ship was wrecked "at Freshwater", "in the Straits". Her crew were rescued. She was on a voyage from Punta Arena, Chile to Montevideo, Uruguay.
Swalan	Sweden	The schooner was driven ashore on "Svenska Born". She was on a voyage from Sundsvall to Aarhus, Denmark.
Urania	United Kingdom	The ship caught fire at sea and was abandoned. Her crew were rescued. She was on a voyage from Quebec City, Canada to London.
Viatka	United Kingdom	The ship was driven ashore on "Kullagrunden". She was on a voyage from Saint Petersburg to London. She was refloated and taken in to Copenhagen in a severely leaky condition. She was placed under repair.
Vesta	Germany	The schooner was driven ashore on Seskar, Russia. She was on a voyage from Messina, Sicily, Italy to Saint Petersburg.
Vulcan	Germany	The steamship ran aground at Yenikale, Russia. She was on a voyage from Hamburg to Taganrog, Russia. She was refloated the next day.
Westminster	United Kingdom	The ship ran aground at "Traverse". She was on a voyage from Quebec City to Bristol, Gloucestershire. She was refloated with assistance.
Willemseck Passthe de Vrouw Marie	Netherlands	The tjalk was run down and sunk in the Scheldt by the steamship Archimedes (United Kingdom). Willemseck Passthe de Vrouw Marie was on a voyage from Zierikzee, Zeeland to Baasrode, East Flanders, Belgium.
Xenia	United Kingdom	The ship was wrecked at Foul Point, Merina Kingdom before 22 October. All on board were rescued She was on a voyage from London to the Merina Kingdom.
Zeevaart	Netherlands	The galiot was wrecked at Oostmahorn, Friesland. Her crew were rescued. She was on a voyage from Fredrikstad to Groningen.
Unnamed	France	The fishing sloop was driven ashore at Wells-next-the-Sea, Norfolk.
Unnamed	United Kingdom	The dandy collided with another vessel and sank off Sandgate, Kent.
Ten unnamed vessels	Flags unknown	The ships were lost at "Santa Anna".
