= Rovny (inhabited locality) =

Rovny (Russian: Ро́вный; masculine), Rovnaya (Ро́вная; feminine), or Rovnoye (Ро́вное; neuter) is the name of several inhabited localities in Russia.

== Amur Oblast ==
As of 2022, one rural locality in Amur Oblast bears this name:

- Rovnoye, Amur Oblast, a selo in Volkovsky Rural Settlement of Blagoveshchensky District

== Belgorod Oblast ==
As of 2022, one rural locality in Belgorod Oblast bears this name:

- Rovnoye, Belgorod Oblast, a settlement in Nasonovsky Rural Okrug of Valuysky District

== Kaliningrad Oblast ==
As of 2022, two rural localities in Kaliningrad Oblast bear this name:

- Rovnoye, Gvardeysky District, Kaliningrad Oblast, a settlement in Znamensky Rural Okrug of Gvardeysky District
- Rovnoye, Pravdinsky District, Kaliningrad Oblast, a settlement under the administrative jurisdiction of Pravdinsk Town of District Significance of Pravdinsky District

== Khabarovsk Krai ==
As of 2022, one rural locality in Khabarovsk Krai bears this name:

- Rovnoye, Khabarovsk Krai, a selo in Khabarovsky District

== Krasnodar Krai ==
As of 2022, one rural locality in Krasnodar Krai bears this name:

- Rovny, Krasnodar Krai, a settlement in Stepnyansky Rural Okrug of Kushchyovsky District

== Krasnoyarsk Krai ==
As of 2022, one rural locality in Krasnoyarsk Krai bears this name:

- Rovnoye, Krasnoyarsk Krai, a selo in Rovnensky Selsoviet of Balakhtinsky District

== Kurgan Oblast ==
As of 2022, one rural locality in Kurgan Oblast bears this name:

- Rovnaya, a selo in Rovnensky Selsoviet of Ketovsky District

== Kursk Oblast ==
As of 2022, two rural localities in Kursk Oblast bear this name:

- Rovnoye, Gorshechensky District, Kursk Oblast, a selo in Bykovsky Selsoviet of Gorshechensky District
- Rovnoye, Khomutovsky District, Kursk Oblast, a settlement in Bolshealeshnyansky Selsoviet of Khomutovsky District

== Leningrad Oblast ==
As of 2022, one rural locality in Leningrad Oblast bears this name:

- Rovnoye, Leningrad Oblast, a logging depot settlement in Krasnoselskoye Settlement Municipal Formation of Vyborgsky District

== Republic of Mordovia ==
As of 2022, one rural locality in the Republic of Mordovia bears this name:

- Rovny, Republic of Mordovia, a settlement in Ryazanovsky Selsoviet of Staroshaygovsky District

== Nizhny Novgorod Oblast ==
As of 2022, one rural locality in Nizhny Novgorod Oblast bears this name:

- Rovny, Nizhny Novgorod Oblast, a settlement in Strelsky Selsoviet of Vadsky District

== Novgorod Oblast ==
As of 2022, two rural localities in Novgorod Oblast bear this name:

- Rovnoye, Yegolskoye Settlement, Borovichsky District, Novgorod Oblast, a village in Yegolskoye Settlement of Borovichsky District
- Rovnoye, Zhelezkovskoye Settlement, Borovichsky District, Novgorod Oblast, a village in Zhelezkovskoye Settlement of Borovichsky District

== Orenburg Oblast ==
As of 2022, one rural locality in Orenburg Oblast bears this name:

- Rovny, Orenburg Oblast, a settlement in Uralsky Selsoviet of Kuvandyksky District

== Perm Krai ==
As of 2022, one rural locality in Perm Krai bears this name:

- Rovny, Perm Krai, a khutor in Vereshchaginsky District

== Pskov Oblast ==
As of 2022, seven rural localities in Pskov Oblast bear this name:

- Rovnoye, Dedovichsky District, Pskov Oblast, a village in Dedovichsky District
- Rovnoye (Ivanovskaya Rural Settlement), Nevelsky District, Pskov Oblast, a village in Nevelsky District; municipally, a part of Ivanovskaya Rural Settlement of that district
- Rovnoye (Plisskaya Rural Settlement), Nevelsky District, Pskov Oblast, a village in Nevelsky District; municipally, a part of Plisskaya Rural Settlement of that district
- Rovnoye (Ust-Dolysskaya Rural Settlement), Nevelsky District, Pskov Oblast, a village in Nevelsky District; municipally, a part of Ust-Dolysskaya Rural Settlement of that district
- Rovnoye, Novorzhevsky District, Pskov Oblast, a village in Novorzhevsky District
- Rovnoye, Ostrovsky District, Pskov Oblast, a village in Ostrovsky District
- Rovnoye, Strugo-Krasnensky District, Pskov Oblast, a village in Strugo-Krasnensky District

== Ryazan Oblast ==
As of 2022, one rural locality in Ryazan Oblast bears this name:

- Rovnoye, Ryazan Oblast, a village in Rovnovsky Rural Okrug of Ryazansky District

== Samara Oblast ==
As of 2022, one rural locality in Samara Oblast bears this name:

- Rovny, Samara Oblast, a settlement in Sergiyevsky District

== Saratov Oblast ==
As of 2022, two inhabited localities in Saratov Oblast bear this name.

Urban localities

- Rovnoye, Saratov Oblast, a work settlement in Rovensky District

Rural localities

- Rovny, Saratov Oblast, a settlement in Novouzensky District

== Stavropol Krai ==
As of 2022, two rural localities in Stavropol Krai bear this name:

- Rovny, Kursky District, Stavropol Krai, a settlement in Kursky Selsoviet of Kursky District
- Rovny, Stepnovsky District, Stavropol Krai, a khutor in Verkhnestepnovsky Selsoviet of Stepnovsky District

== Tver Oblast ==
As of 2022, two rural localities in Tver Oblast bear this name:

- Rovnoye, Rameshkovsky District, Tver Oblast, a village in Rameshkovsky District
- Rovnoye, Zubtsovsky District, Tver Oblast, a village in Zubtsovsky District
