= Rovny =

Rovny (masculine), Rovnaya (feminine), or Rovnoye (neuter) may refer to:

- Ivan Rovny (b. 1987), Russian road bicycle racer
- Rovny (inhabited locality) (Rovnaya, Rovnoye), name of several inhabited localities in Russia
