= Svetloye =

Svetloye (Russian: Светлое) is the name of several rural localities in Russia:

- Svetloye, Altai Krai, a selo in Zavyalovsky District, Altai Krai
- Svetloye, Astrakhan Oblast, a village in Ikryaninsky District, Astrakhan Oblast
