= Malinovka, Aleysky District, Altai Krai =

Malinovka Малиновка
- Selo
- Location within Altai Krai Location within Russia
- Coordinates: 52°28′N 82°14′E
- Country: Russia
- Region: Altai Krai
- District: Aleysky District
- Time zone: UTC+7:00

Malinovka (Russian: Малиновка) is a rural locality (a selo) and the administrative center of Malinovsky Selsoviet of Aleysky District, Altai Krai, Russia. The population was 262 as of 2016. There are 6 streets.

== Geography ==
Malinovka is located 47 km west of Aleysk (the district's administrative centre) by road. Bobrovka is the nearest rural locality.

== Ethnicity ==
The village is inhabited by Russians, and other ethnicities.
