= Yermakovo =

Yermakovo Ермаково
- Settlement
- Location within Vologda Oblast Location within Russia
- Coordinates: 59°11′N 39°42′E
- Country: Russia
- Region: Vologda Oblast
- District: Vologodsky District
- Time zone: UTC+3:00

Yermakovo (Russian: Ермаково) is a rural locality (a settlement) in Leskovskoye Rural Settlement, Vologodsky District, Vologda Oblast, Russia. The population was 1,517 as of 2002. There are 29 streets.

== Geography ==
Yermakovo is located 14 km southwest of Vologda (the district's administrative centre) by road. Skorbezhevo is the nearest rural locality.
