= Brusovo =

Brusovo (Russian: Брусово) is the name of several rural localities in Russia:

- Brusovo, Irkutsk Oblast, a settlement in Tayshetsky District of Irkutsk Oblast
- Brusovo, Tver Oblast, a settlement in Brusovskoye Rural Settlement of Udomelsky District in Tver Oblast
