= Zarechye, Nyuksensky District, Vologda Oblast =

Zarechye Заречье
- Village
- Location within Vologda Oblast Location within Russia
- Coordinates: 60°28′N 44°45′E
- Country: Russia
- Region: Vologda Oblast
- District: Nyuksensky District
- Time zone: UTC+3:00

Zarechye (Russian: Заречье) is a rural locality (a village) in Nyuksenskoye Rural Settlement, Nyuksensky District, Vologda Oblast, Russia. The population was 27 as of 2002.

== Geography ==
Zarechye is located 61 km northeast of Nyuksenitsa (the district's administrative centre) by road. Bobrovskoye is the nearest rural locality.
