= Kostromino =

Kostromino Костромино
- Village
- Location within Vologda Oblast Location within Russia
- Coordinates: 59°32′N 39°07′E
- Country: Russia
- Region: Vologda Oblast
- District: Vologodsky District
- Time zone: UTC+3:00

Kostromino (Russian: Костромино) is a rural locality (a village) in Novlenskoye Rural Settlement, Vologodsky District, Vologda Oblast, Russia. The population was 46 as of 2002.

== Geography ==
Kostromino is located 74 km (46 mi) northwest of Vologda (the district's administrative centre) by road. Ignachevo is the nearest rural locality.
