= Svetloye, Astrakhan Oblast =

Svetloye Светлое
- Selo
- Location within Astrakhan Oblast Location within Russia
- Coordinates: 45°53′N 47°37′E
- Country: Russia
- Region: Astrakhan Oblast
- District: Ikryaninsky District
- Time zone: UTC+4:00

Svetloye (Russian: Светлое) is a rural locality (a selo) in Ikryaninsky District, Astrakhan Oblast, Russia. The population was 254 as of 2010. There are 3 streets.

== Geography ==
Svetloye is located 27 km south of Ikryanoye (the district's administrative centre) by road. Ninovka is the nearest rural locality.
