= Zarechye, Republic of Buryatia =

Zarechye Заречье
- Selo
- Location within Republic of Buryatia Location within Russia
- Coordinates: 52°32′N 107°09′E
- Country: Russia
- Region: Republic of Buryatia
- District: Kabansky District
- Time zone: UTC+8:00

Zarechye (Russian: Заречье) is a rural locality (a selo) in Kabansky District, Republic of Buryatia, Russia. The population was 335 as of 2010. There are 10 streets.

== Geography ==
Zarechye is located 98 km northeast of Kabansk (the district's administrative centre) by road. Sukhaya is the nearest rural locality.
