= Malinovka =

Malinovka can refer to:

- Malinovka, Belgorod Oblast, a village in western Russia
- Malinovka (Perm Krai), a tributary of the Mulyanka river
- Malinovka (Primorsky Krai), a tributary of the Bolshaya Ussurka river
- Maļinovka, Latvia
- Malynivka, Kharkiv Oblast, a settlement in eastern Ukraine
- Akmol, formerly named Malīnovka, Kazakhstan
