= Zarechye, Ternovsky District, Voronezh Oblast =

Zarechye Заречье
- Settlement
- Location within Voronezh Oblast Location within Russia
- Coordinates: 51°31′N 41°29′E
- Country: Russia
- Region: Voronezh Oblast
- District: Ternovsky District
- Time zone: UTC+3:00

Zarechye (Russian: Заречье) is a rural locality (a settlement) in Kostino-Otdelskoye Rural Settlement, Ternovsky District, Voronezh Oblast, Russia. The population was 167 as of 2010.

== Geography ==
Zarechye is located 26 southwest km of Ternovka (the district's administrative centre) by road. Kostino-Otdelets is the nearest rural locality.
