= Ryabinovka =

Ryabinovka Рябиновка
- Selo
- Location within Belgorod Oblast Location within Russia
- Coordinates: 51°07′N 37°40′E
- Country: Russia
- Region: Belgorod Oblast
- District: Gubkinsky District
- Time zone: UTC+3:00

Ryabinovka (Russian: Рябиновка) is a rural locality (a selo) in Gubkinsky District, Belgorod Oblast, Russia. The population was 65 as of 2010. There are four streets.

== Geography ==
Ryabinovka is located 33 km southeast of Gubkin (the district's administrative centre) by road. Uspenka is the nearest rural locality.
