= Okunevo =

Okunevo (Russian: Окунево) is the name of several rural localities in Russia:

- Okunevo, Republic of Buryatia, a settlement in Tsipikansky Selsoviet of Bauntovsky District of the Republic of Buryatia
- Okunevo, Chelyabinsk Oblast, a village in Kocherdyksky Selsoviet of Oktyabrsky District of Chelyabinsk Oblast
- Okunevo, Kaliningrad Oblast, a settlement in Kamensky Rural Okrug of Chernyakhovsky District of Kaliningrad Oblast
- Okunevo, Kemerovo Oblast, a selo in Okunevskaya Rural Territory of Promyshlennovsky District of Kemerovo Oblast
- Okunevo, Kirov Oblast, a settlement in Mikheyevsky Rural Okrug of Lebyazhsky District of Kirov Oblast
- Okunevo, Nizhny Novgorod Oblast, a village in Vyazovsky Selsoviet of Tonkinsky District of Nizhny Novgorod Oblast
- Okunevo, Omsk Oblast, a village in Bergamaksky Rural Okrug of Muromtsevsky District of Omsk Oblast
- Okunevo, Pskov Oblast, a village in Pushkinogorsky District of Pskov Oblast
- Okunevo, Sverdlovsk Oblast, a settlement in Turinsky District of Sverdlovsk Oblast
- Okunevo, Tyumen Oblast, a selo in Okunevsky Rural Okrug of Berdyuzhsky District of Tyumen Oblast
- Okunevo, Kirillovsky District, Vologda Oblast, a village in Talitsky Selsoviet of Kirillovsky District of Vologda Oblast
- Okunevo, Vologodsky District, Vologda Oblast, a village in Semenkovsky Selsoviet of Vologodsky District of Vologda Oblast
- Okunevo, Danilovsky District, Yaroslavl Oblast, a village in Seredskoy Rural Okrug of Danilovsky District of Yaroslavl Oblast
- Okunevo, Nekrasovsky District, Yaroslavl Oblast, a village in Rodyukinsky Rural Okrug of Nekrasovsky District of Yaroslavl Oblast
