= Zarechye, Kirzhachsky District, Vladimir Oblast =

Zarechye Заречье
- Selo
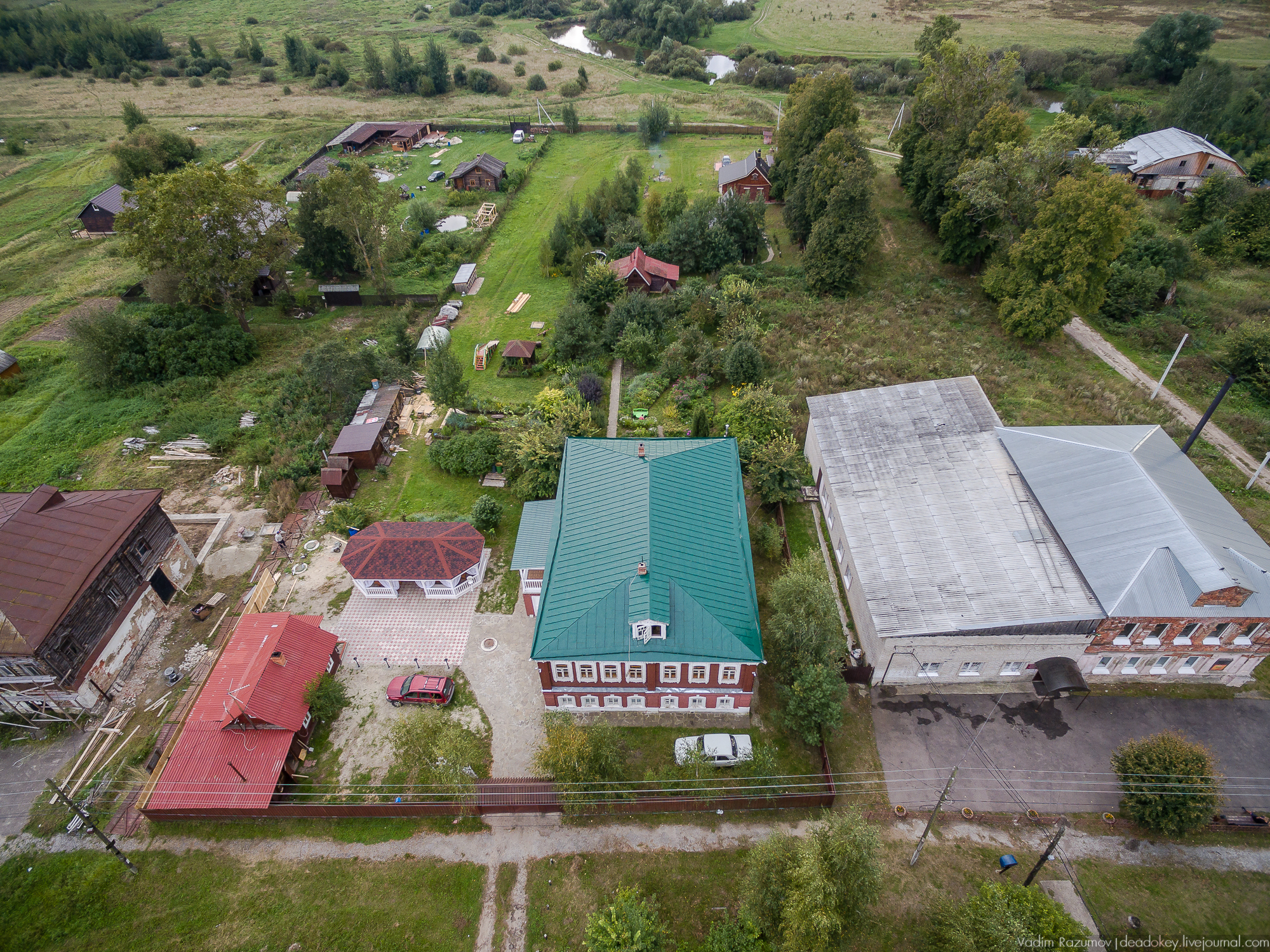

- Location within Vladimir Oblast Location within Russia
- Coordinates: 55°59′N 38°36′E
- Country: Russia
- Region: Vladimir Oblast
- District: Kirzhachsky District
- Time zone: UTC+3:00

Zarechye (Russian: Заречье) is a rural locality (a selo) in Filippovskoye Rural Settlement, Kirzhachsky District, Vladimir Oblast, Russia. The population was 292 as of 2010. There are 13 streets.

== Geography ==
Zarechye is located on the left bank of the Sherna River, 39 km southwest of Kirzhach (the district's administrative centre) by road. Ratkovo is the nearest rural locality.
