= Rovnoye, Amur Oblast =

Rovnoye Ровное
- Selo
- Location within Amur Oblast Location within Russia
- Coordinates: 50°17′N 127°46′E
- Country: Russia
- Region: Amur Oblast
- District: Blagoveshchensky District
- Time zone: UTC+9:00

Rovnoye (Russian: Ровное) is a rural locality (a selo) in Volkovsky Selsoviet of Blagoveshchensky District, Amur Oblast, Russia. The population was 420 as of 2018. There are 6 streets.

== Geography ==
Rovnoye is located 23 km east of Blagoveshchensk (the district's administrative centre) by road. Ust-Ivanovka is the nearest rural locality.
