= Rovnoye, Saratov Oblast =

Rovnoye Ровное
- Urban-type settlement
- Interactive map of Rovnoye
- Location of Rovnoye Rovnoye (Saratov Oblast)
- Coordinates: 50.7758°N 46.0583°E
- Country: Russia
- Federal subject: Saratov Oblast
- Administrative district: Rovensky District
- Founded: 1785

Population (2010 Census)
  - Total: 5,438
  - Estimate (2021): 4,550 (−16.3%)
- Time zone: UTC+4 (MSK+1)
- Postal code: 413277
- OKTMO ID: 63639151051

Rovnoye (Russian: Ровное) is an urban locality (an urban-type settlement) in Rovensky District of Saratov Oblast, Russia. Population: 4,538 (2010 census); 5,267 (2002 census); 5,559 (1989 Soviet census).
