= Malinovka, Belgorod Oblast =

Malinovka Малиновка
- Settlement
- Location within Belgorod Oblast Location within Russia
- Coordinates: 50°23′N 36°19′E
- Country: Russia
- Region: Belgorod Oblast
- District: Belgorodsky District
- Time zone: UTC+3:00

Malinovka (Russian: Малиновка) is a rural locality (a settlement) and the administrative center of Belovskoye Rural Settlement, Belgorodsky District, Belgorod Oblast, Russia. The population was 556 as of 2010. There are 11 streets.
