= Malinovka, Bureysky District, Amur Oblast =

Malinovka Малиновка
- Selo
- Location within Amur Oblast Location within Russia
- Coordinates: 49°46′N 129°50′E
- Country: Russia
- Region: Amur Oblast
- District: Bureysky District
- Time zone: UTC+9:00

Malinovka (Russian: Малиновка) is a rural locality (a selo) and the administrative center of Malinovsky Selsoviet of Bureysky District, Amur Oblast, Russia. The population was 1,126 as of 2018. There are 25 streets.

== Geography ==
Malinovka is located on the right bank of the Bureya River, 4 km southwest of Novobureysky (the district's administrative centre) by road. Novobureysky is the nearest rural locality.
