= Primorye, Kaliningrad Oblast =

Settlement in Kaliningrad Oblast, Russia

Coordinates: 54°56′30″N 20°2′0″E

Primorye (Russian: Примо́рье) before 1946 known as Groß Kuhren (Lithuanian: Didieji Kuršiai) is an urban locality (an urban-type settlement) in Svetlogorsky District of Kaliningrad Oblast, Russia. Population: 954 (2010 census); 848 (2002 census); 705 (1989 Soviet census).
