= Livensky =

Livensky (Russian: Ливенский; masculine), Livenskaya (Ливенская; feminine), or Livenskoye (Ливенское; neuter) is the name of several rural localities in Russia:

- Livenskoye, Kaliningrad Oblast, a settlement in Alexeyevsky Rural Okrug of Krasnoznamensky District of Kaliningrad Oblast
- Livenskoye, Tula Oblast, a village in Prilepsky Rural Okrug of Leninsky District of Tula Oblast
- Livenskaya, a village in Bolkhovskoy Selsoviet of Zadonsky District of Lipetsk Oblast
