= Novosyolovo =

Rural locality name

Novosyolovo or Novoselovo (Russian: Новосёлово) is the name of several rural localities in Russia:

- Novosyolovo, Krasnoyarsk Krai, a selo in Novosyolovsky District of Krasnoyarsk Krai
- Novosyolovo, Kirzhachsky District, Vladimir Oblast, the place of Yuri Gagarin's death
- Novosyolovo, Nizhny Novgorod Oblast, a village in Sharangsky District of Nizhny Novgorod Oblast
