= Cape Aston =

Peninsula on eastern Baffin Island, Canada

Coordinates: 69.991°N 67.297°W

Cape Aston (Inuktitut: Niaqonaujang) is a large peninsula on eastern Baffin Island, Qikiqtaaluk Region, Nunavut, Canada. Located on Baffin Bay just south of Clyde Inlet, the closest settlement is Clyde River. The cape includes an ice-derived delta.

Cape Aston has the smallest distance to Greenland in the Baffin Bay, some 340 km, and is most likely the first location on the North American Continent, sighted by a European, namely Norse Leiv Eirikson in about year 1003.
