= Rovnoye, Belgorod Oblast =

Rovnoye Ровное
- Settlement
- Location within Belgorod Oblast Location within Russia
- Coordinates: 50°10′N 38°15′E
- Country: Russia
- Region: Belgorod Oblast
- District: Valuysky District
- Time zone: UTC+3:00

Rovnoye (Russian: Ровное) is a rural locality (a settlement) in Valuysky District, Belgorod Oblast, Russia. The population was 212 as of 2010. There are 6 streets.

== Geography ==
Rovnoye is located 15 km southeast of Valuyki (the district's administrative centre) by road. Zenino is the nearest rural locality.
