= Zarechye, Mezhdurechensky District, Vologda Oblast =

Zarechye Заречье
- Village
- Location within Vologda Oblast Location within Russia
- Coordinates: 59°19′N 40°47′E
- Country: Russia
- Region: Vologda Oblast
- District: Mezhdurechensky District
- Time zone: UTC+3:00

Zarechye (Russian: Заречье) is a rural locality (a village) in Staroselskoye Rural Settlement, Mezhdurechensky District, Vologda Oblast, Russia. The population was 2 as of 2002.

== Geography ==
Zarechye is located 19 km southwest of Shuyskoye (the district's administrative centre) by road. Obroshino is the nearest rural locality.
