= Bobrovka, Shipunovsky District, Altai Krai =

Bobrovka Бобровка
- Selo
- Location within Altai Krai Location within Russia
- Coordinates: 52°24′N 82°07′E
- Country: Russia
- Region: Altai Krai
- District: Shipunovsky District
- Time zone: UTC+7:00

Bobrovka (Russian: Бобровка) is a rural locality (a selo) and the administrative center of Bobrovsky Selsoviet, Shipunovsky District, Altai Krai, Russia. The population was 850 as of 2013. There are 17 streets.

== Geography ==
Bobrovka is located 27 km north of Shipunovo (the district's administrative centre) by road. Beryozovka is the nearest rural locality.
