= Furmanovo =

Furmanovo (Russian: Фурманово) is the name of several inhabited localities in Russia.

Rural localities

- Furmanovo, Bagrationovsky District, an abandoned settlement in Bagrationovsky District of Kaliningrad Oblast
- Furmanovo, Gusevsky District, a settlement in Gusevskoye Urban Settlement of Gusevsky District of Kaliningrad Oblast
- Furmanovo, Primorsky Krai, a settlement in Mikhaylovka Rural Settlement of Olginsky District of Primorsky Krai
- Furmanovo, Saratov Oblast, a settlement in Kirovskoye Rural Settlement of Marksovsky District of Saratov Oblast
