= Mostovoye (Amur Oblast) =

Mostovoye Мостовое
- Selo
- Location within Amur Oblast Location within Russia
- Coordinates: 50°45′N 128°56′E
- Country: Russia
- Region: Amur Oblast
- District: Belogorsky District
- Time zone: UTC+9:00

Mostovoye (Russian: Мостовое) is a rural locality (a selo) in Novinsky Selsoviet of Belogorsky District, Amur Oblast, Russia. The population was 14 as of 2018. There are 3 streets.

== Geography ==
Mostovoye is located 46 km southeast of Belogorsk (the district's administrative centre) by road. Lugovoye is the nearest rural locality.
