= Tretyakovo =

Tretyakovo Третьяково
- Station
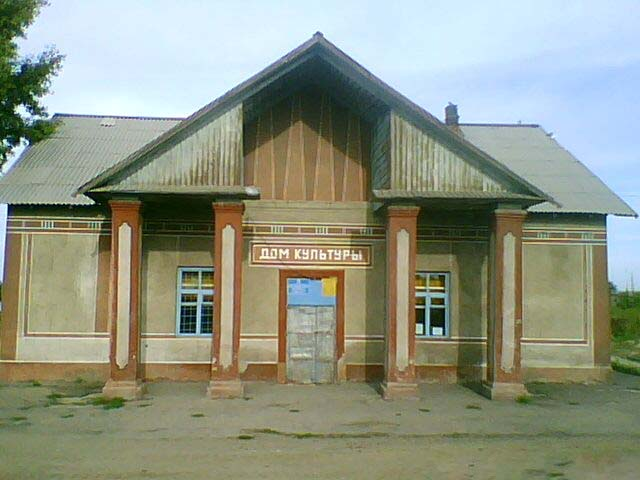
- House of culture

- Location within Altai Krai Location within Russia
- Coordinates: 50°51′N 81°53′E
- Country: Russia
- Region: Altai Krai
- District: Tretyakovsky District
- Time zone: UTC+7:00

Tretyakovo (Russian: Третьяково) is a rural locality (a station) and the administrative center of Tretyakovsky Selsoviet, Tretyakovsky District, Altai Krai, Russia. The population was 796 as of 2013. There are 17 streets.

== Geography ==
It is located 18 km south from Staroaleyskoye.
