= Zarechye, Selivanovsky District, Vladimir Oblast =

Zarechye Заречье
- Village
- Location within Vladimir Oblast Location within Russia
- Coordinates: 55°52′N 41°47′E
- Country: Russia
- Region: Vladimir Oblast
- District: Selivanovsky District
- Time zone: UTC+3:00

Zarechye (Russian: Заречье) is a rural locality (a village) in Chertkovskoye Rural Settlement, Selivanovsky District, Vladimir Oblast, Russia. The population was 27 as of 2010.

== Geography ==
Zarechye is located on the Kestromka River, 4 km northeast of Krasnaya Gorbatka (the district's administrative centre) by road. Krasnaya Gorbatka is the nearest rural locality.
