= Rovensky District, Saratov Oblast =

Rovensky District Ровенский район
- District
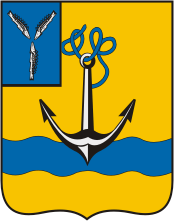
- Coat of arms
- Location of Rovensky District in Saratov Oblast
- Coordinates: 50°46′20″N 46°03′34″E
- Country: Russia
- Federal subject: Saratov Oblast
- Established: 7 September 1941
- Administrative center: Rovnoye

Area
  - Total: 2,100 km^{2} (810 sq mi)

Population (2010 Census)
  - Total: 16,654
  - Density: 7.9/km^{2} (21/sq mi)
  - Urban: 27.2%
  - Rural: 72.8%

Administrative structure
  - Inhabited localities: 1 urban-type settlements, 25 rural localities

Municipal structure
  - Municipally incorporated as: Rovensky Municipal District
  - Municipal divisions: 1 urban settlements, 12 rural settlements
- Time zone: UTC+4 (MSK+1)
- OKTMO ID: 63639000
- Website: http://rovnoe.sarmo.ru/

Rovensky District (Russian: Ровенский райо́н) is an administrative and municipal district (raion), one of the thirty-eight in Saratov Oblast, Russia. It is located in the south of the oblast. The area of the district is 2,100 square kilometers (810 sq mi). Its administrative center is the urban locality (a work settlement) of Rovnoye. Population: 16,654 (2010 Census); 18,329 (2002 Census); 18,275 (1989 Soviet census). The population of Rovnoye accounts for 27.2% of the district's total population.
