= Babushkino =

Babushkino Бабушкино
- Village
- Location within Vologda Oblast Location within Russia
- Coordinates: 58°52′N 35°16′E
- Country: Russia
- Region: Vologda Oblast
- District: Chagodoshchensky District
- Time zone: UTC+3:00

Babushkino (Russian: Бабушкино) is a rural locality (a village) in Lukinskoye Rural Settlement, Chagodoshchensky District, Vologda Oblast, Russia. The population was 31 as of 2002.

== Geography ==
Babushkino is located 43 km (27 mi) south of Chagoda (the district's administrative centre) by road. Rusino is the nearest rural locality.
