= Kostrovo =

Kostrovo Кострово
- Village
- Location within Vladimir Oblast Location within Russia
- Coordinates: 55°58′N 40°37′E
- Country: Russia
- Region: Vladimir Oblast
- District: Sudogodsky District
- Time zone: UTC+3:00

Kostrovo (Russian: Кострово) is a rural locality (a village) in Golovinskoye Rural Settlement, Sudogodsky District, Vladimir Oblast, Russia. The population was 3 as of 2010.

== Geography ==
Kostrovo is located 16 km west of Sudogda (the district's administrative centre) by road. Mitkino is the nearest rural locality.
