= Soldatovo =

Soldatovo Солдатово
- Selo
- Location within Altai Krai Location within Russia
- Coordinates: 52°20′N 84°04′E
- Country: Russia
- Region: Altai Krai
- District: Bystroistoksky District
- Time zone: UTC+7:00

Soldatovo (Russian: Солдатово) is a rural locality (a selo) in Akutikhinsky Selsoviet, Bystroistoksky District, Altai Krai, Russia. The population was 116 as of 2013. There are 6 streets.

== Geography ==
Soldatovo is located 176 km SSW of Bystry Istok (the district's administrative centre) by road, on the Ob River. Verkh-Ozyornoye is the nearest rural locality.
