= Zarechye, Ivanovsky District, Ivanovo Oblast =

Zarechye Заречье
- Village
- Location within Ivanovo Oblast Location within Russia
- Coordinates: 57°01′N 40°53′E
- Country: Russia
- Region: Ivanovo Oblast
- District: Ivanovsky District
- Time zone: UTC+3:00

Zarechye (Russian: Заречье) is a rural locality (a village) in Ivanovsky District, Ivanovo Oblast, Russia. Population: 8 (2010 census);

== Geography ==
This rural locality is located 7 km from Ivanovo (the district's administrative centre and capital of Ivanovo Oblast) and 243 km from Moscow. Govyadovo is the nearest rural locality.
