= Bogatovo =

- Village
- Location within Bulgaria
- Coordinates: 43°02′N 25°10′E
- Country: Bulgaria
- Province: Gabrovo Province
- Municipality: Sevlievo

Population (2011)
  - Total: 420
- Time zone: UTC+2 (EET)
  - Summer (DST): UTC+3 (EEST)

Bogatovo is a village in the municipality of Sevlievo, in Gabrovo Province, in northern central Bulgaria. In 2011, it was home to 420 people.

Ethnicity of Population (2011 Census)
Ethnic Group	Population	%
Bulgarian	360	85.71
Turks	44	10.47
Didn't Answer	14	3.33
