= Zagorskoye, Bashkortostan =

Zagorskoye: Загорское (Russian); Загорский (Bashkir)
- Village
- Location within Bashkortostan Location within European Russia Location within Russia
- Coordinates: 54°46′N 56°37′E
- Country: Russia
- Region: Bashkortostan
- District: Iglinsky District
- Time zone: UTC+5:00

Zagorskoye (Russian: Загорское, Bashkir: Загорский) is a rural locality (a village) in Baltiysky Selsoviet, Iglinsky District, Bashkortostan, Russia. The population was 48 as of 2010. There are 4 streets.

== Geography ==
Zagorskoye is located 25 km southeast of Iglino (the district's administrative centre) by road. Zavety Ilyicha is the nearest rural locality.
