= Lesnoy, Kaliningrad Oblast =

Lesnoy Лесно́й
- Rural locality
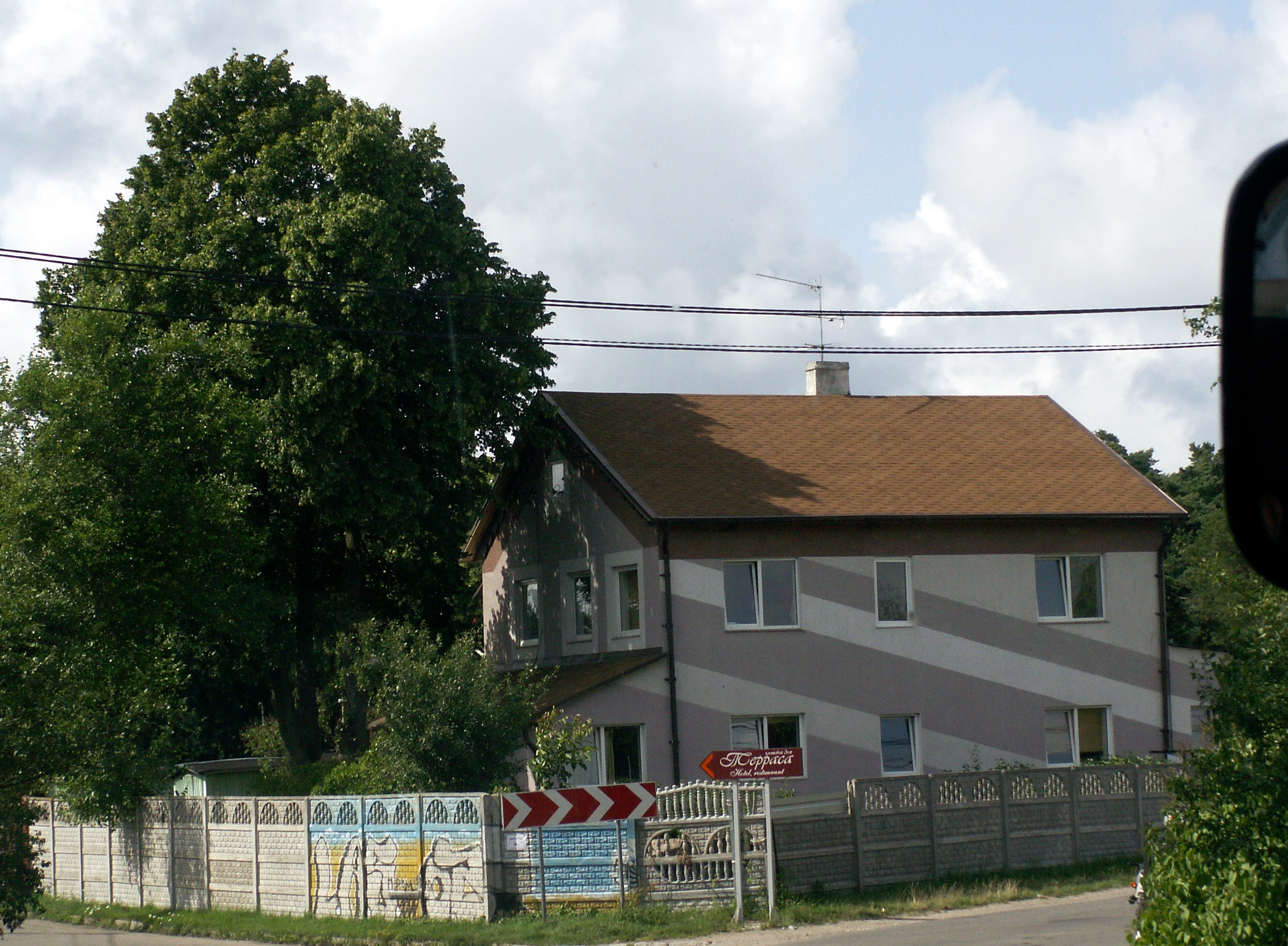
- Interactive map of Lesnoy
- Location of Lesnoy Lesnoy (European Russia) Lesnoy (Russia)
- Coordinates: 55°00′43″N 20°37′05″E
- Country: Russia
- Federal subject: Kaliningrad Oblast
- Administrative district: Zelenogradsky District
- First mentioned: 1382
- Elevation: 5 m (16 ft)

Population (2010 Census)
  - Total: 344
  - Estimate (2010): 344 (0%)
- Time zone: UTC+2 (MSK–1)
- Postal code: 238534
- OKTMO ID: 27710000551

Lesnoy (Russian: Лесно́й; Polish: Sarkowo; German: Sarkau; Lithuanian: Šarkuva) is a rural locality (a settlement) in Kurshsky Rural Okrug of Zelenogradsky District of Kaliningrad Oblast, Russia. Population: 425 (2011 est.). It is located on the Curonian Spit.

== History ==
The German name of the town was derived from the Prussian word Szarka, meaning magpie or falcon, which suggests that birds were trained there for hunting.

In the 14th century, the German settlement of Sarkau emerged on the site of an ancient Curonian settlement; the first documented references to it date back to 1362, and in 1408, an inn is mentioned. In 1531, 35 fishermen and 12 farmhands lived in Sarkau. In 1568–69, a second inn was established. By 1569, there were two inns, and the population consisted of 32 fishermen and 19 farmhands.

Drifting sand resulting from unchecked deforestation threatened the settlement, which had to be relocated 1.5 km further south in 1715 by order of the authorities. However, deforestation and the spread of drifting sand persisted, leading to a impoverishment of the residents. This was so severe that the authorities permitted the Sarkau fishermen to fish throughout the entire lagoon in 1792.

An economic boom began with the rise of tourism around 1870, which also had a positive impact on the town’s development. Sarkau was known for its flounder, which was smoked with pine cones and thus had a distinctive flavor.

In 1939, Sarkau had a population of 705.

The village was renamed Lesnoy in 1946.

== Economy ==
After World War II, in 1947–1948, following the arrival of families of fishermen from Astrakhan and Arkhangelsk on the Curonian Spit, fishermen from the villages of Morskoy, Lesnoy, and Rybachye founded the fishing collective farms “Путь к коммунизму ,” “Труженик моря ,” and “Заря Кубани .” Subsequently, these three collective farms were merged into one “Труженик моря ”, which expanded its operations from coastal waters into the open ocean, acquired and developed a large ocean-going fleet, built its own fish-processing complex, and supplied fish to the entire country. The collective is still functioning as of the writing.

== Attractions ==
- In 1901 a new church was built after the old church, from the early 14th century, had fallen to disrepair. The new church used materials from the old church. The church burned down during World War Two. After the war, the remaining nave of the church was used as a warehouse. Later the church was demolished and parts of its walls and foundation were used to build a house of culture.
- Villa "Elise", built in 1903, is in use as a guesthouse.
- Church of the Great Martyr Panteleimon.
