= Zhaltyr (Pavlodar Region) =

Lake in Pavlodar Region, Kazakhstan

- Жалтыр
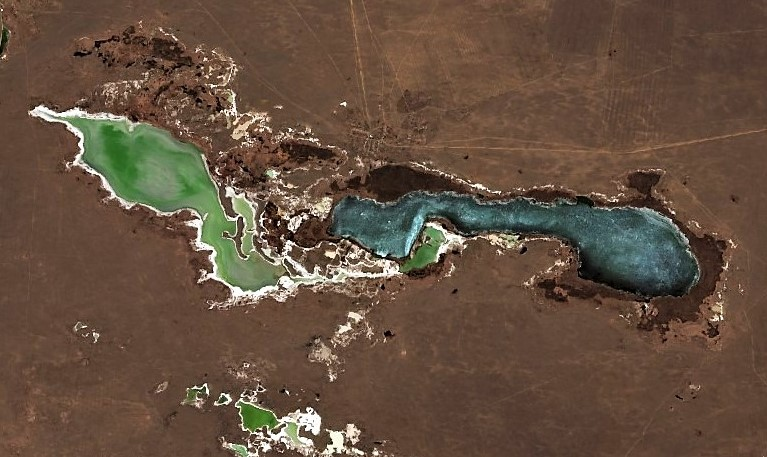
- Lakes Zhaltyr (left) and Malybay (right) Sentinel-2 image; Malybay village can be seen at the top.

- Location within Kazakhstan
- Location: Kulunda Plain
- Coordinates: 51°37′43″N 78°15′39″E
- Type: Endorheic lake
- Basin countries: Kazakhstan
- Max. length: 8.7 kilometers (5.4 mi)
- Max. width: 1.8 kilometers (1.1 mi)
- Surface area: 9.6 square kilometers (3.7 sq mi)
- Residence time: UTC+5
- Shore length^{1}: 22.8 kilometers (14.2 mi)
- Surface elevation: 139 meters (456 ft)
- Islands: none
- Settlements: Malybay
- ^{1} Shore length is not a well-defined measure.

Zhaltyr (Kazakh: Жалтыр) is an endorheic lake in Akkuly District, Pavlodar Region, Kazakhstan.

Zhaltyr lake is near the southern end of Malybay village and about 66 kilometers (41 mi) west of the Russia-Kazakhstan border. Akkuly, the district capital, is 41 kilometers (25 mi) to the southwest.

== Geography ==
Zhaltyr is part of the Irtysh basin. It lies in a tectonic depression of the Kulunda Plain. Lake Malybay lies close to its northeastern side and red lake Kyzyltuz close to the west. Sharbakty lies 24 kilometers (15 mi) to the south, Borli 28 kilometers (17 mi) to the northwest, Bargana 37 kilometers (23 mi) to the ENE, and Tuz 35 kilometers (22 mi) to the SSE.

The lake has an elongated shape, stretching roughly from southeast to northwest for less than 9 kilometers (5.6 mi). The lake is shallower than its eastern neighbor and its water is harder and has a higher salinity. The shores are flat and marshy. The lake fills mainly with rainfall and groundwater. It freezes at the end of November and thaws in April.

== Flora and fauna ==
Lake Zhaltyr is surrounded by steppe vegetation. The areas near the shore are used as pasture for local cattle.

== See also ==
- List of lakes of Kazakhstan
