= Shoktal =

Village in Akkuly District, Kazakhstan

Shoktal Шоқтал
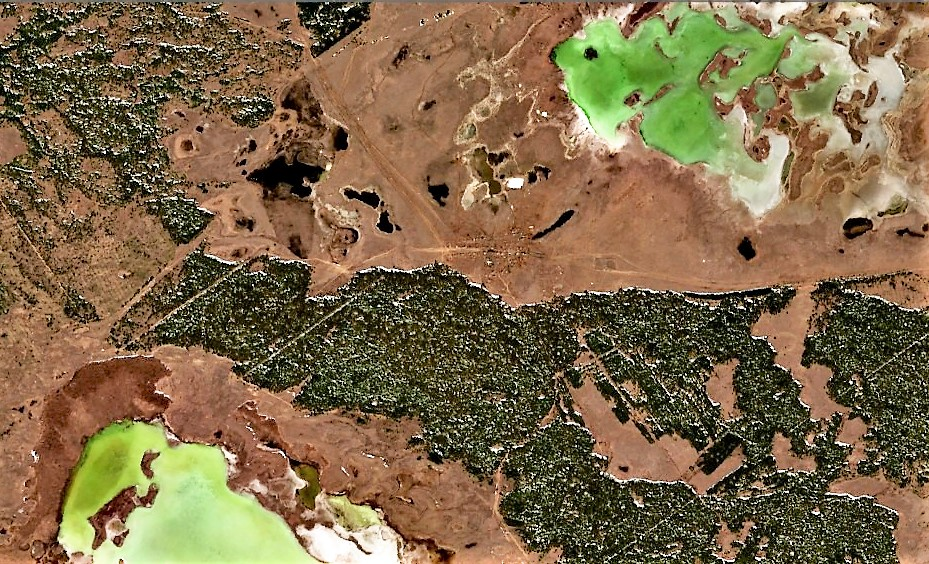
- Sentinel-2 image

- Location in Kazakhstan
- Coordinates: 51°47′52″N 78°59′17″E
- Country: Kazakhstan
- Region: Pavlodar Region
- District: Akkuly District
- Rural District: Shaka Rural District

Population (2009)
  - Total: 223
- Time zone: UTC+5

Shoktal (Kazakh: Шоқтал; Russian: Шоктал) is a settlement in Akkuly District, Pavlodar Region, Kazakhstan. It is part of the Shaka Rural District (KATO code — 555257500). Population: 223 (2009 census results); 348 (1999 census results).

== Geography ==
Shoktal is located in the Kulunda Steppe, 3 kilometers (1.9 mi) to the northeast of Bargana lake. There is also a large sor 2 kilometers (1.2 mi) to the ENE of the village. Akkuly town, the district capital, lies 90 kilometers (56 mi) to the southwest, and Maykaragay village 12 kilometers (7.5 mi) to the WSW. The Russia-Kazakhstan border and lake Gornostalevo lie 20 kilometers (12 mi) to the northeast.
