= Shoshkaly (Abai Region) =

Lake in Kazakhstan

- Шошқалы
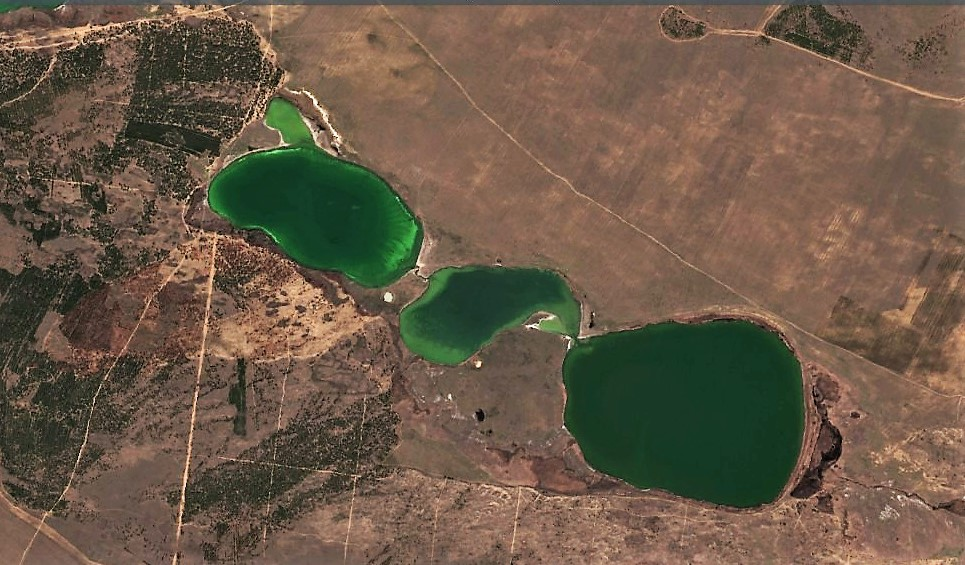
- Sentinel-2 picture of the lake.

- Location within Kazakhstan
- Location: Kulunda Plain
- Coordinates: 51°15′13″N 78°45′56″E
- Type: Salt lake
- Basin countries: Kazakhstan
- Max. length: 7.5 kilometers (4.7 mi)
- Max. width: 2.2 kilometers (1.4 mi)
- Surface area: 11.5 square kilometers (4.4 sq mi)
- Residence time: UTC+6
- Surface elevation: 135 meters (443 ft)
- Islands: none
- Settlements: Tosagash

Shoshkaly (Kazakh: Шошқалы; Russian: Шошкалы) is a salt lake in Beskaragay District, Abai Region, Kazakhstan.

The lake is about 55 kilometers (34 mi) west of the Russia-Kazakhstan border. Tosagash village is 3 kilometers (1.9 mi) to the north, Begen 18 kilometers (11 mi) to the ESE and Beskaragay, the district capital, 62 kilometers (39 mi) to the southeast. The border of Pavlodar Region stretches close to the northern lakeshore.

== Geography ==
Shoshkaly is an endorheic lake part of the Irtysh basin. It lies in a tectonic depression at the southern end of the Kulunda Plain. Lake Tuz stretches 2.6 kilometers (1.6 mi) to the northwest, Uyaly 28 kilometers (17 mi) to the WNW, Sormoildy 30 kilometers (19 mi) to the northeast, and lake Tengizsor 10 kilometers (6.2 mi) to the southwest. River Irtysh flows 40 kilometers (25 mi) to the WSW.

Shoshkaly consists in three connected lakes, of which the southern is the largest one. The lakes are oriented in a roughly southeast–northwest direction. Shoshkaly doesn't dry out in the summer and doesn't freeze in the winter. The M38 Highway from the Border of Russia to Pavlodar and Semey (Semipalatinsk), passes 6 kilometers (3.7 mi) to the southwest of the lake.

== Flora and fauna ==
Lake Shoshkaly is surrounded by steppe vegetation.

== See also ==
- List of lakes of Kazakhstan
