= Kazy (village) =

Village in Akkuly District, Kazakhstan

Kazy Қазы
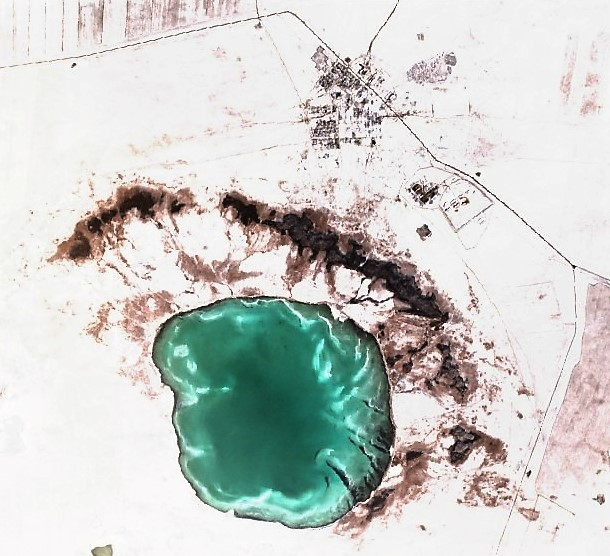
- Kazy to the north of the lake Sentinel-2 image

- Location in Kazakhstan
- Coordinates: 51°44′03″N 78°04′21″E
- Country: Kazakhstan
- Region: Pavlodar Region
- District: Akkuly District
- Rural District: Kazy Rural District

Population (2009)
  - Total: 696
- Time zone: UTC+6
- Postcode: 140704

Kazy (Kazakh: Қазы; Russian: Казы) is a settlement in Akkuly District, Pavlodar Region, Kazakhstan. It is the administrative center of Kazy Rural District (KATO code — 555255100). Population: 696 (2009 census results); 814 (1999 census results).

== Geography ==
Kazy is located in the Kulunda Steppe 1.5 kilometers (0.93 mi) to the north of Kazy lake. Akkuly town, the district capital, lies 32 kilometers (20 mi) to the southwest, and Malybay village 25 kilometers (16 mi) to the southeast.
