= Sormoildy =

Lake in Kazakhstan

- Сормойылды
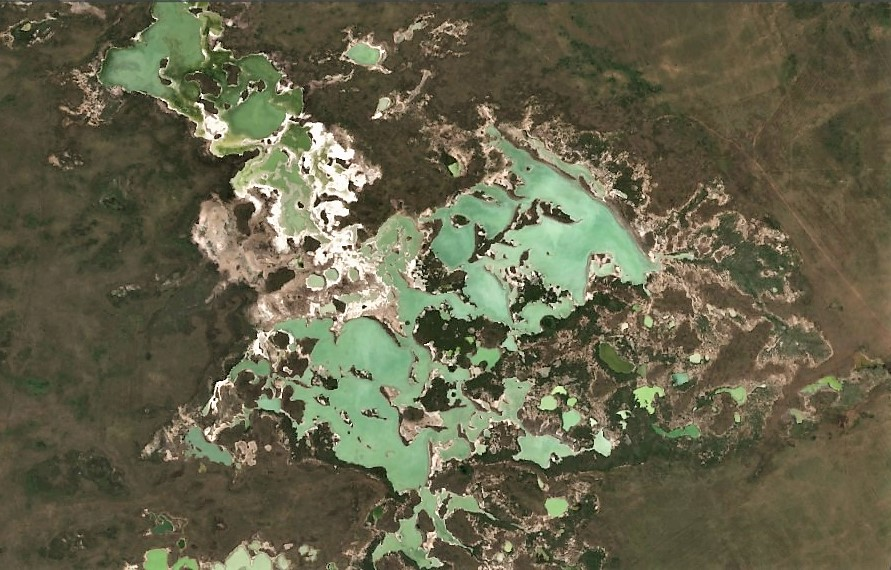
- Sentinel-2 picture of the center of the lake cluster.

- Location within Kazakhstan
- Location: Kulunda Plain
- Coordinates: 51°25′34″N 79°11′39″E
- Type: Salt lake
- Basin countries: Kazakhstan
- Max. length: 7 kilometers (4.3 mi)
- Max. width: 3.5 kilometers (2.2 mi)
- Surface area: 12.7 square kilometers (4.9 sq mi)
- Residence time: UTC+6
- Shore length^{1}: 44.5 kilometers (27.7 mi)
- Surface elevation: 160 meters (520 ft)
- Settlements: Koyanbay
- ^{1} Shore length is not a well-defined measure.

Sormoildy or Sormoiyldy (Kazakh: Сормойылды; Russian: Сормойылды) is a salt lake group in Beskaragay District, Abai Region, Kazakhstan.

Sormoildy is 18 kilometers (11 mi) west of the Russia-Kazakhstan border. Koyanbay village is 18 kilometers (11 mi) to the northeast, Begen 25 kilometers (16 mi) to the southwest and Beskaragay, the district capital, 60 kilometers (37 mi) to the SSE. Malinovoye Ozero town is 45 kilometers (28 mi) to the northeast, on the other side of the Russian border.

== Geography ==
Sormoildy is an endorheic lake cluster part of the Irtysh basin. It lies in a tectonic depression at the southern end of the Kulunda Plain. Lakes Tuz and Shoshkaly stretch roughly 30 kilometers (19 mi) to the southwest, and lake Bargana 32 kilometers (20 mi) to the NNW. Lake Malinovoye lies 44 kilometers (27 mi) to the northeast, on the other side of the border. The Irtysh river flows 75 kilometers (47 mi) to the WSW.

The lakes of the group are spread out in the flat basin and, except for the smaller ones on the periphery, they are connected following the melting of the steppe snow in the spring. By the summer most of the lakes are dry. The central part of the cluster has an approximate length of 7 kilometers (4.3 mi) and a width of 3.5 kilometers (2.2 mi), but its shoreline is not well defined, with numerous indentations and islands. In years of drought Sormoildy dries out completely.

== Flora and fauna ==
Sormoildy is surrounded by steppe vegetation.

== See also ==
- Sor (geomorphology)
