= Bargana =

Lake in Pavlodar Region, Kazakhstan

- Барғана
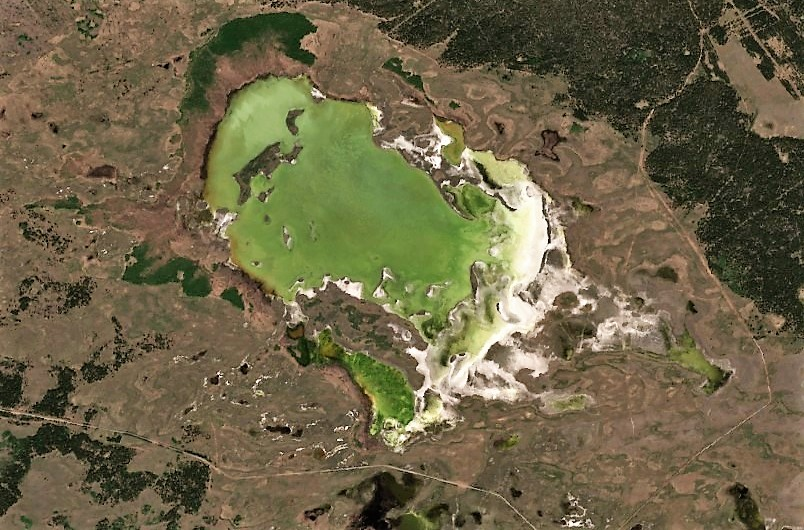
- Lake Bargana Sentinel-2 image.

- Location within Kazakhstan
- Location: Kulunda Plain
- Coordinates: 51°45′36″N 78°57′32″E
- Type: Endorheic
- Basin countries: Kazakhstan
- Max. length: 4.5 kilometers (2.8 mi)
- Max. width: 2.7 kilometers (1.7 mi)
- Surface area: 9.4 square kilometers (3.6 sq mi)
- Residence time: UTC+5
- Shore length^{1}: 13.2 kilometers (8.2 mi)
- Surface elevation: 148 meters (486 ft)
- Islands: numerous
- Settlements: Shoktal
- ^{1} Shore length is not a well-defined measure.

Bargana (Kazakh: Барғана; Russian: Баргана) is a salt lake in Akkuly District, Pavlodar Region, Kazakhstan.

Bargana lake is 19 kilometers (12 mi) west of the Russia-Kazakhstan border, 3.5 kilometers (2.2 mi) southwest of Shoktal village and 10 kilometers (6.2 mi) east of Maykaragay. Akkuly, the district capital, is roughly 83 kilometers (52 mi) to the southwest.

== Geography ==
Bargana is part of the Irtysh basin. It lies in a tectonic depression of the Kulunda Plain. Lake Malybay 36 kilometers (22 mi) is located to the southwest and red lake Kyzyltuz 3.5 kilometers (2.2 mi) further to the west. Seiten lies 55 kilometers (34 mi) to the WNW, Borli 62 kilometers (39 mi) to the west, and Sormoildy 32 kilometers (20 mi) to the SSE. Lake Gornostalevo lies 23 kilometers (14 mi) to the northeast and Malinovoye 49 kilometers (30 mi) to the east, both on the other side of the border. The Irtysh river flows 82 kilometers (51 mi) to the southwest.

The lake has an elongated, irregular shape, stretching roughly from southeast to northwest for about 5 kilometers (3.1 mi). The eastern and northern coastlines are rocky. The remaining lakeshore sections are flat and swampy, fringed by salt marshes.

== Flora and fauna ==
Lake Bargana is surrounded by steppe vegetation. Its waters are used for watering local livestock until autumn, when the salinity increases and they become unsuitable for the purpose.

== See also ==
- List of lakes of Kazakhstan
