= Sharbakty (Akkuly District) =

Village in Akkuly District, Kazakhstan

Sharbakty Шарбақты
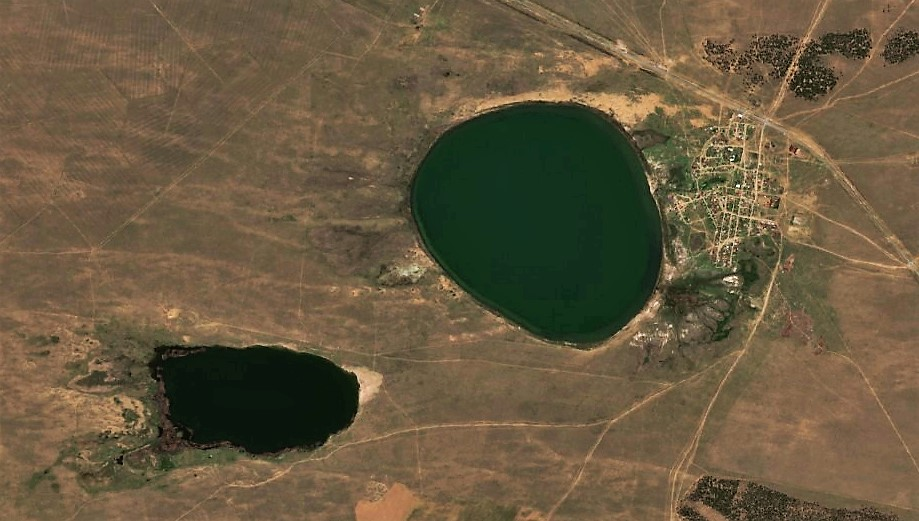

- Location in Kazakhstan
- Coordinates: 51°23′23″N 78°17′24″E
- Country: Kazakhstan
- Region: Pavlodar Region
- District: Akkuly District
- Rural District: Sharbakty Rural District

Population (2009)
  - Total: 1,089
- Time zone: UTC+6
- Postcode: 140709

Sharbakty (Kazakh: Шарбақты) is a settlement in Akkuly District, Pavlodar Region, Kazakhstan. It is the capital and the administrative center of Sharbakty Rural District (KATO code — 555259100). Population: 1,089 (2009 census results); 1,461 (1999 census results).

== Geography ==
Sharbakty lies by the eastern shore of salt lake Sharbakty, 4 kilometers (2.5 mi) to the northeast of lake Toleuberdy and 6 kilometers (3.7 mi) to the north of soda lake Uyaly. Akkuly town, the district capital lies 36 kilometers (22 mi) to the WNW.
