= Malybay =

Malybay may refer to:

- Malybay (Almaty Region), a village in Enbekshikazakh District, Kazakhstan
- Malybay (Pavlodar Region), a village in Akkuly District, Kazakhstan
- Malybay (lake), a lake in the Kulunda Plain, Kazakhstan
