= Kazy =

Lake in Kazakhstan

- Қазы
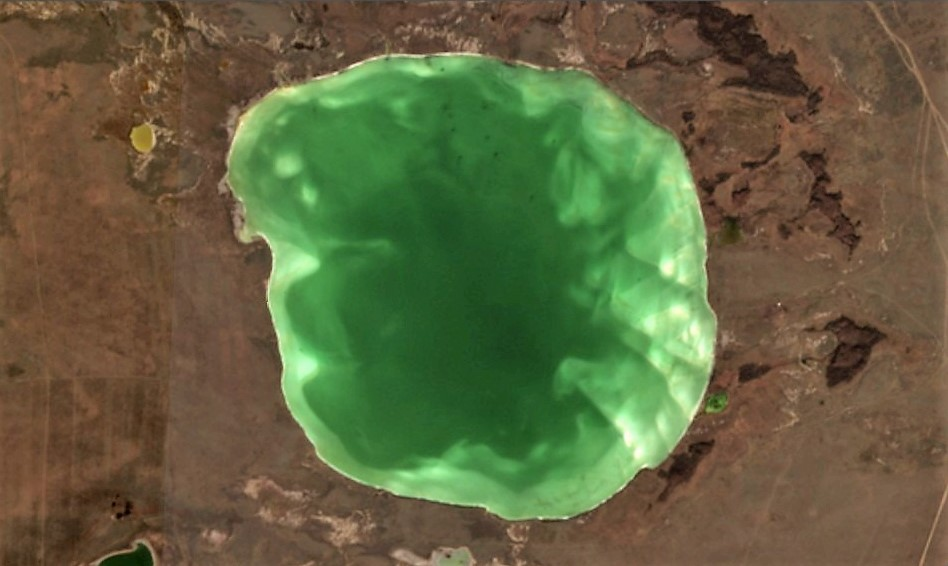
- Sentinel-2 picture of the lake

- Location within Kazakhstan
- Location: Kulunda Plain
- Coordinates: 51°42′09″N 78°03′33″E
- Type: Salt lake
- Catchment area: 106 square kilometers (41 sq mi)
- Basin countries: Kazakhstan
- Max. length: 3 kilometers (1.9 mi)
- Max. width: 2.7 kilometers (1.7 mi)
- Surface area: 6 square kilometers (2.3 sq mi)
- Average depth: 1.6 meters (5 ft 3 in)
- Water volume: 0.005 cubic kilometers (0.0012 cu mi)
- Residence time: UTC+5
- Shore length^{1}: 8.9 kilometers (5.5 mi)
- Surface elevation: 119 meters (390 ft)
- Islands: none
- Settlements: Kazy
- ^{1} Shore length is not a well-defined measure.

Kazy (Kazakh: Қазы; Russian: Казы) is a salt lake in Akkuly District, Pavlodar Region, Kazakhstan.

== Location ==
The lake is located 1.5 kilometers (0.93 mi) to the south of Kazy village, 25 kilometers (16 mi) to the northwest of Malybay, about 70 kilometers (43 mi) west of the Russia-Kazakhstan border. Akkuly, the district capital, lies 30 kilometers (19 mi) to the southwest.

== Geography ==
Kazy is part of the Irtysh basin. It lies in a tectonic depression of the Kulunda Plain. Lake Borli is located 11 kilometers (6.8 mi) to the northwest, Kyzyltuz 6 kilometers (3.7 mi) to the ESE, and Seiten 22 kilometers (14 mi) to the north.

The shape of the lake is roughly oval. Compared to neighboring lakes it is relatively deep and displays a bluish-green hue. The eastern and northwestern shores are flat and swampy, but the southern coast is rocky.

== Flora and fauna ==
Lake Kazy is surrounded by steppe vegetation. The water is salty and has a high mineralization. It is not suitable for watering livestock.

== See also ==
- List of lakes of Kazakhstan
