= Tosagash =

Village in Akkuly District, Kazakhstan

Tosagash Төсағаш
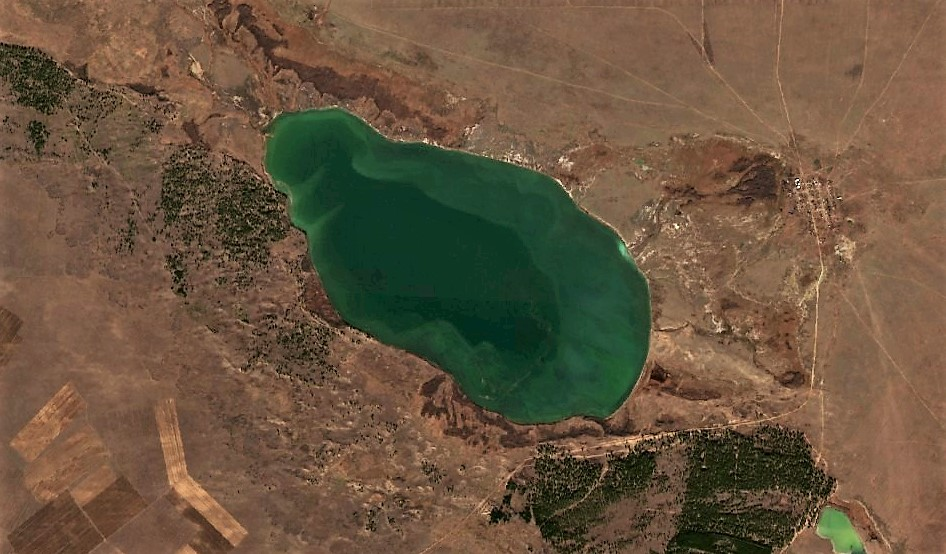

- Location in Kazakhstan
- Coordinates: 51°19′06″N 78°41′49″E
- Country: Kazakhstan
- Region: Pavlodar Region
- District: Akkuly District
- Rural District: Sharbakty Rural District

Population (2021)
  - Total: 291
- Time zone: UTC+6

Tosagash (Kazakh: Төсағаш), formerly known as Zori Oktyabrya, is a settlement in Akkuly District, Pavlodar Region, Kazakhstan. It is part of the Sharbakty Rural District (KATO code — 555259200). Population: 341 (2009 census results); 362 (1999 census results).

== Geography ==
Tosagash lies at the southeastern end of the district, close to the eastern shore of Tuz lake and 3 kilometers (1.9 mi) to the north of Shoshkaly. Akkuly town, the district capital lies 65 kilometers (40 mi) to the northwest.
