= Malybay (lake) =

Lake in Pavlodar Region, Kazakhstan

- Малыбай
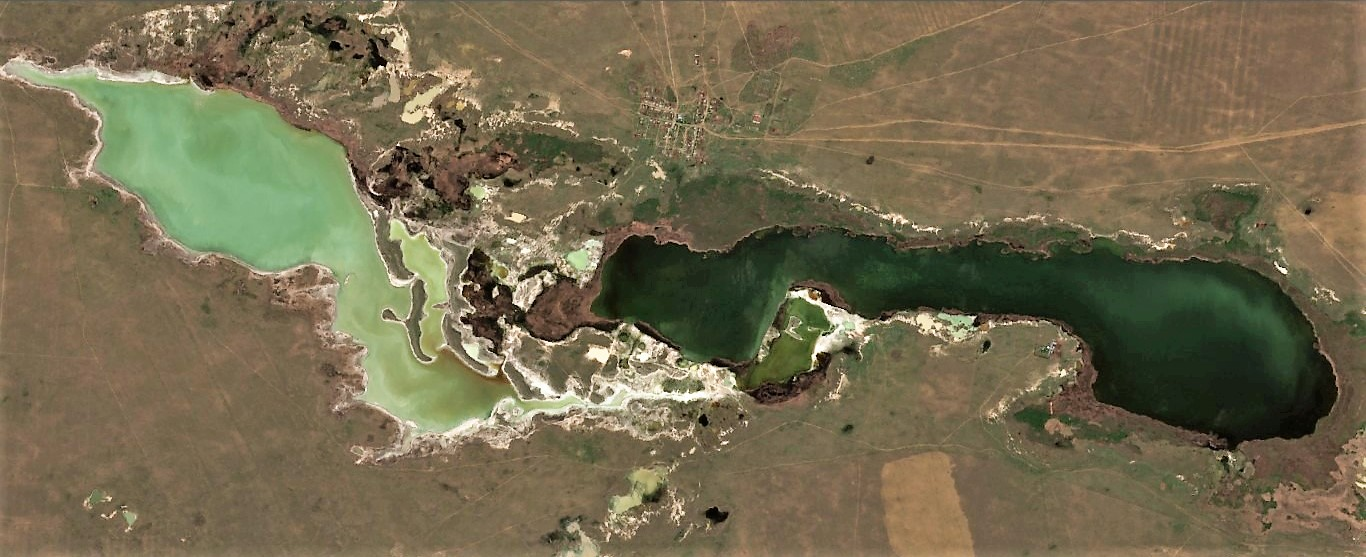
- Lakes Zhaltyr (left) and Malybay (right) Sentinel-2 image; Malybay village can be seen at the top.

- Location within Kazakhstan
- Location: Kulunda Plain
- Coordinates: 51°37′07″N 78°23′01″E
- Type: Endorheic lake
- Catchment area: 142 square kilometers (55 sq mi)
- Basin countries: Kazakhstan
- Max. length: 9.5 kilometers (5.9 mi)
- Max. width: 2.2 kilometers (1.4 mi)
- Surface area: 12.2 square kilometers (4.7 sq mi)
- Average depth: 5 meters (16 ft)
- Residence time: UTC+6
- Shore length^{1}: 23.4 kilometers (14.5 mi)
- Surface elevation: 143 meters (469 ft)
- Islands: none
- Settlements: Malybay
- ^{1} Shore length is not a well-defined measure.

Malybay (Kazakh: Малыбай) is an endorheic lake in Akkuly District, Pavlodar Region, Kazakhstan.

Malybay lake is near the southern end of Malybay village and about 60 kilometers (37 mi) west of the Russia-Kazakhstan border. Akkuly, the district capital, is 42 kilometers (26 mi) to the southwest.

== Geography ==
Malybay is part of the Irtysh basin. It lies in a tectonic depression of the Kulunda Plain. Lake Zhaltyr lies close to its western end and red lake Kyzyltuz 1.5 kilometers (0.93 mi) further to the west. Sharbakty lies 24 kilometers (15 mi) to the south, Borli 30 kilometers (19 mi) to the northwest, Bargana 36 kilometers (22 mi) to the ENE, and Tuz 34 kilometers (21 mi) to the SSE.

The lake has an elongated shape, stretching from east to west for about 9 kilometers (5.6 mi). The eastern end and the western end are wider than the middle part. Malybay is fairly deeper than other lakes in the area and its waters have a darker hue. The shores are flat and marshy. The lake freezes in the winter and doesn't dry out in the summer.

== Flora and fauna ==
Lake Malybay is surrounded by steppe vegetation. Reeds grow in most stretches of the lakeshore providing a habitat for aquatic birds and muskrats. Its waters are rich in fish.

== See also ==
- List of lakes of Kazakhstan
