= Tuz (Akkuly District) =

Lake in Kazakhstan

- Тұз
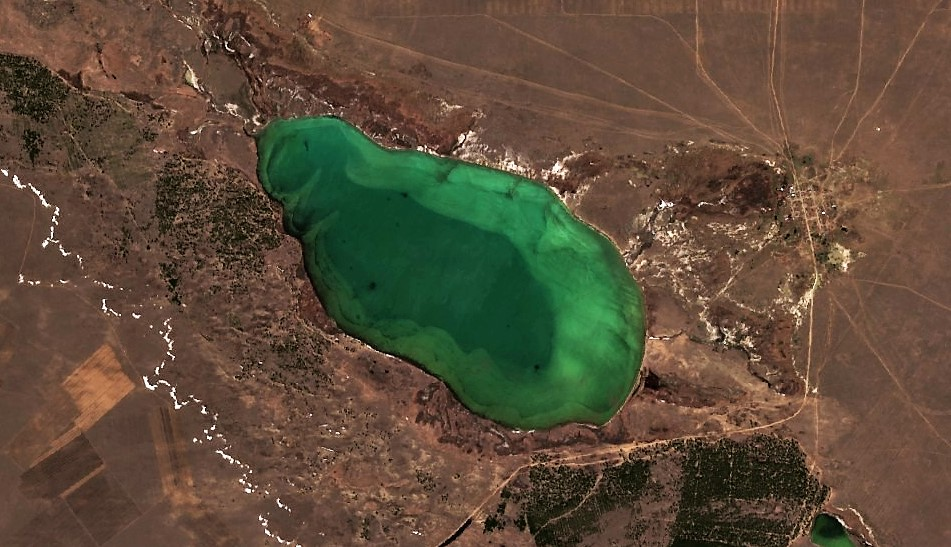
- Sentinel-2 picture of lake Tuz and Tosagash village (right).

- Location within Kazakhstan
- Location: Kulunda Plain
- Coordinates: 51°18′39″N 78°38′29″E
- Type: Salt lake
- Basin countries: Kazakhstan
- Max. length: 5.4 kilometers (3.4 mi)
- Max. width: 2.7 kilometers (1.7 mi)
- Surface area: 10.2 square kilometers (3.9 sq mi)
- Residence time: UTC+6
- Surface elevation: 133 meters (436 ft)
- Islands: none
- Settlements: Tosagash

Tuz (Kazakh: Тұз; Russian: Туз) is a salt lake in Akkuly District, Pavlodar Region, Kazakhstan.

The lake is located about 60 kilometers (37 mi) west of the Russia-Kazakhstan border. Akkuly, the district capital, lies 60 kilometers (37 mi) to the WNW. The border of Abai Region stretches close to the southern lakeshore.

== Geography ==
Tuz is an endorheic lake part of the Irtysh basin. It lies in a tectonic depression at the southern end of the Kulunda Plain. Lake Shoshkaly stretches 2.6 kilometers (1.6 mi) to the southeast, Sharbakty 24 kilometers (15 mi) to the WNW, Malybay 34 kilometers (21 mi) to the NNW, Sormoildy 35 kilometers (22 mi) to the ENE, and lake Tengizsor 10 kilometers (6.2 mi) to the south. River Irtysh flows 40 kilometers (25 mi) to the west.

The lake has a slightly elongated shape oriented in a roughly southeast–northwest direction. It doesn't dry out in the summer and doesn't freeze in the winter. Tosagash village lies 1 kilometer (0.62 mi) from the eastern lakeshore. The M38 Highway from the Border of Russia to Pavlodar and Semey (Semipalatinsk), passes 6 kilometers (3.7 mi) to the southwest of the lake.

== Flora and fauna ==
Lake Tuz is surrounded by steppe vegetation.

== See also ==
- List of lakes of Kazakhstan
