= Uyaly =

Lake in Kazakhstan

- Уялы
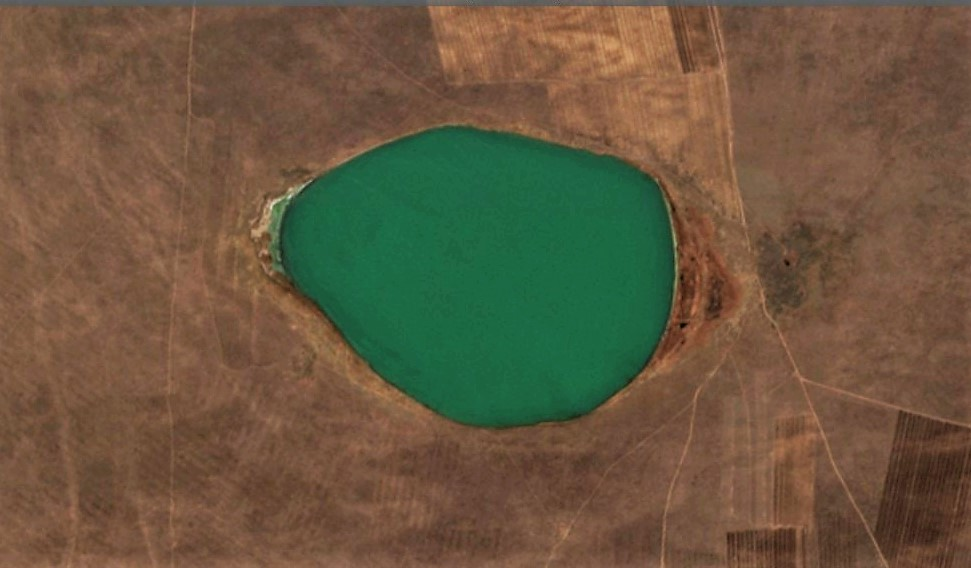
- Sentinel-2 picture of lake Uyaly

- Location within Kazakhstan
- Location: Kulunda Plain
- Coordinates: 51°45′36″N 78°57′32″E
- Type: Alkaline lake
- Basin countries: Kazakhstan
- Max. length: 2.6 kilometers (1.6 mi)
- Max. width: 1.8 kilometers (1.1 mi)
- Surface area: 3.8 square kilometers (1.5 sq mi)
- Residence time: UTC+6
- Surface elevation: 159 meters (522 ft)
- Islands: none

Uyaly (Kazakh: Уялы) is an alkaline lake in Akkuly District, Pavlodar Region, Kazakhstan.

The lake is located about 85 kilometers (53 mi) west of the Russia-Kazakhstan border. The nearest village is Sharbakty 6 kilometers (3.7 mi) to the north. Akkuly, the district capital, lies 36 kilometers (22 mi) to the northwest.

== Geography ==
Uyaly is an endorheic lake part of the Irtysh basin. It lies in a tectonic depression of the Kulunda Plain. Lake Sharbakty lies 5 kilometers (3.1 mi) to the north, Tuz 22 kilometers (14 mi) to the east and Tengizsor 23 kilometers (14 mi) to the southeast. River Irtysh flows 16 kilometers (9.9 mi) to the southwest. The M38 Highway from the Border of Russia to Pavlodar and Semey (Semipalatinsk), passes 6.5 kilometers (4.0 mi) to the northeast of the eastern end of the lake.

The lake has an oval shape roughly oriented in an east–west direction. It doesn't dry out in the summer and always freezes in the winter. Unlike the other lakes in the area, Uyaly's waters are only slightly saline, with a low mineralization of 27 grams per liter (4.3 oz/imp gal), carbonate and bicarbonate being the predominant ions. The pH of the waters is 9.5 and among the lakes of the region only lake Borli further north has an almost as high alkalinity.

== Flora and fauna ==
Lake Uyaly is surrounded by steppe vegetation.

== See also ==
- List of soda lakes
