= Maykaragay =

Village in Akkuly District, Kazakhstan

Maykaragay Майқарағай
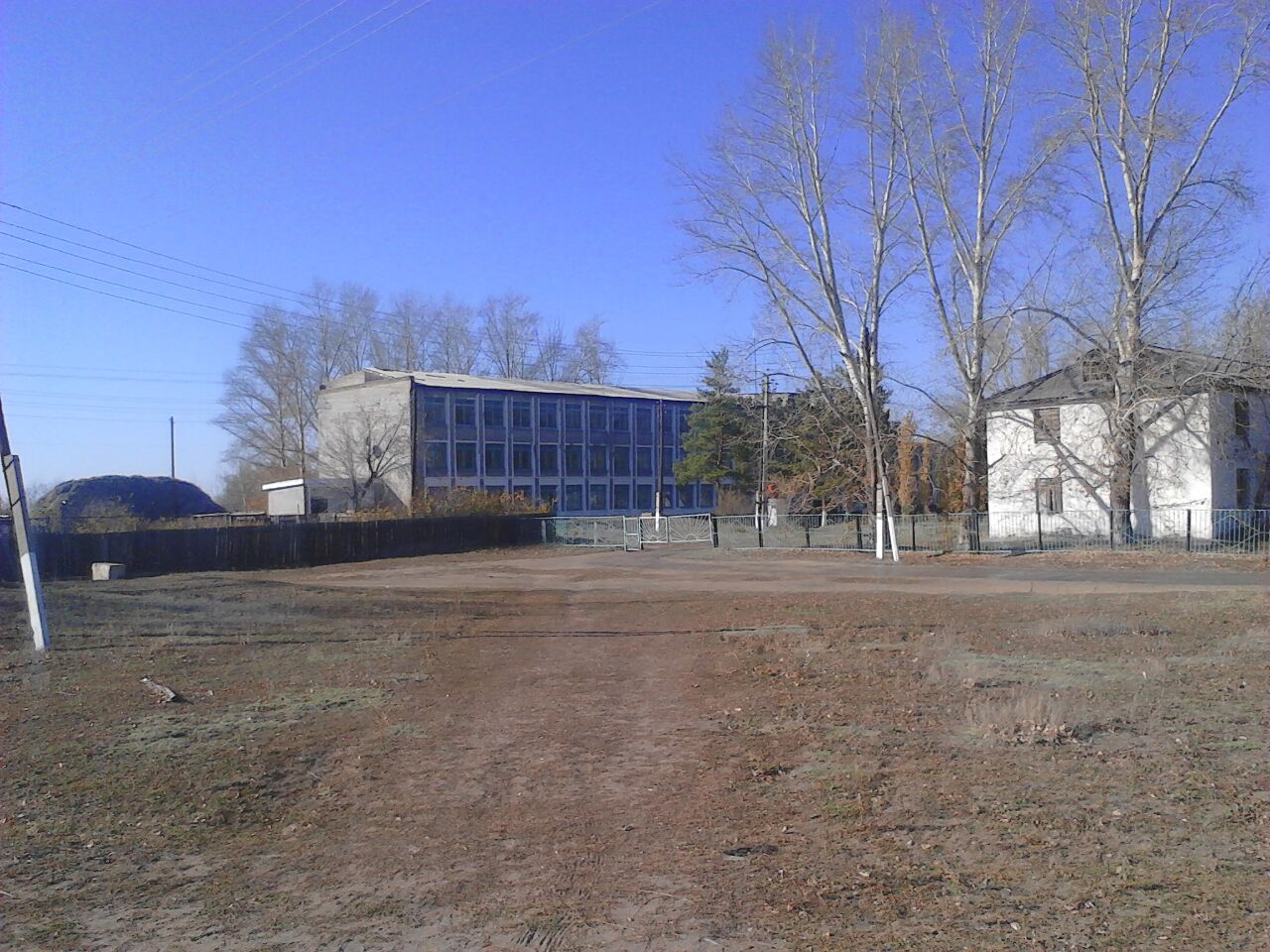
- Maykaragay School

- Location in Kazakhstan
- Coordinates: 51°44′12″N 78°45′00″E
- Country: Kazakhstan
- Region: Pavlodar Region
- District: Akkuly District
- Rural District: Maykaragay Rural District

Population (2009)
  - Total: 423
- Time zone: UTC+5
- Postcode: 140706

Maykaragay (Kazakh: Майқарағай; Russian: Майкарагай) is a settlement in Akkuly District, Pavlodar Region, Kazakhstan. It is the administrative center of Maykaragay Rural District (KATO code — 555253100). Population: 423 (2009 census results); 607 (1999 census results).

== Geography ==
Maykaragay is located in the Kulunda Steppe 16 kilometers (9.9 mi) to the west of Bargana lake. Akkuly town, the district capital, lies 72 kilometers (45 mi) to the southwest, and Malybay village 28 kilometers (17 mi) to the WSW.
