= Begen =

Begen Беген
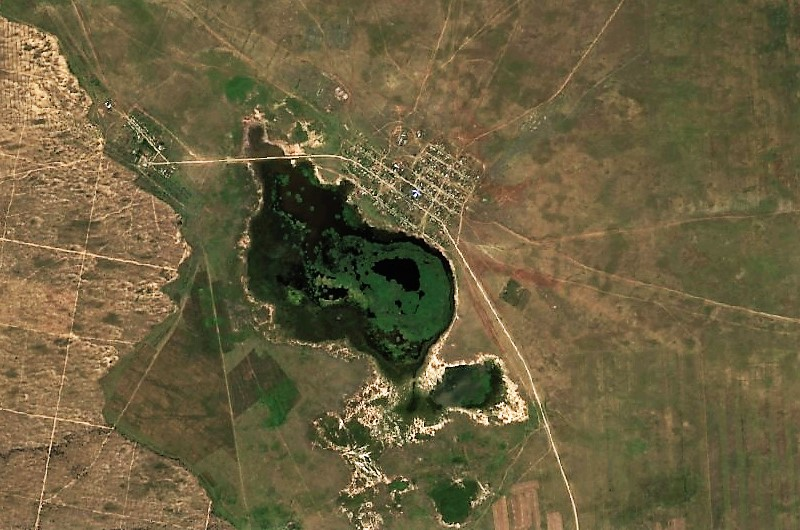
- Begen and its lake

- Location in Kazakhstan
- Coordinates: 51°11′02″N 79°02′42″E
- Country: Kazakhstan
- Region: Abai Region
- District: Beskaragay District
- Rural District: Begen Rural District

Population (2021)
  - Total: 1,133
- Time zone: UTC+6

Begen (Kazakh: Беген; Russian: Бегень) is a settlement in Beskaragay District, Abai Region, Kazakhstan. It is the administrative center of the Begen Rural District (KATO code — 633635100). Population: 1,507 (2009 census results); 1,740 (1999 census results).

== Geography ==
Begen lies 42 kilometers (26 mi) to the west of the Russia-Kazakhstan border, and 45 kilometers (28 mi) to the northwest of Beskaragay, the district capital. There is a shallow salt lake on the southwestern side of the village. Lake Shoshkaly lies 30 kilometers (19 mi) to the northwest and Sormoildy 25 kilometers (16 mi) to the NNE.
