= Kalatuz =

Lake in Kazakhstan

- Қалатұз
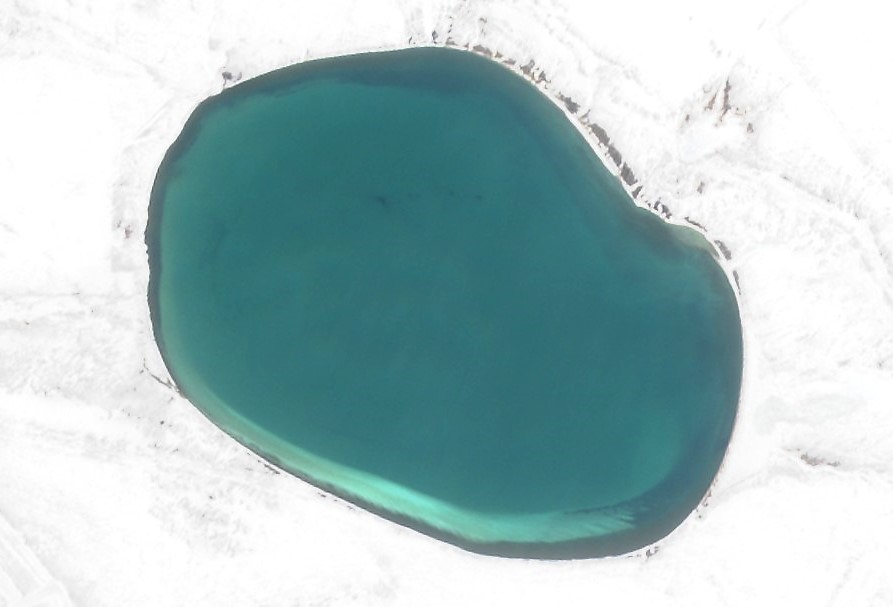
- Sentinel-2 picture of the lake in March

- Location within Kazakhstan
- Location: Kulunda Plain
- Coordinates: 51°52′37″N 77°29′24″E
- Type: Salt lake
- Catchment area: 85 square kilometers (33 sq mi)
- Basin countries: Kazakhstan
- Max. length: 3.9 kilometers (2.4 mi)
- Max. width: 2.4 kilometers (1.5 mi)
- Surface area: 8.2 square kilometers (3.2 sq mi)
- Average depth: 2.7 meters (8 ft 10 in)
- Water volume: 0.0138 cubic kilometers (0.0033 cu mi)
- Residence time: UTC+6
- Shore length^{1}: 12.2 meters (40 ft)
- Surface elevation: 102 meters (335 ft)
- Islands: none
- ^{1} Shore length is not a well-defined measure.

Kalatuz (Kazakh: Қалатұз) is a salt lake in Akkuly District, Pavlodar Region, Kazakhstan.

The lake lies 47 kilometers (29 mi) to the NNW of Akkuly, the district capital, and about 55 kilometers (34 mi) southeast of Pavlodar, the regional capital. The lake water is not suitable for watering livestock.

== Name ==
The lake was originally called Lake Yamysh by the Kalmyks, being derived from the Turkic word yam, while the Russians called it Yamyshev. After the dissolution of the Soviet Union, it was renamed Lake Kalatuz, meaning "much salt" in Kazakh.

== History ==
The lake was likely a station in the Mongols' yam postal system. After the founding of the Russian city of Tobolsk, the lake was used to supply salt to the city.

== Geography ==
Kalatuz is part of the Irtysh basin. It lies in a tectonic depression of the Kulunda Plain close to the Irtysh, only 4 kilometers (2.5 mi) northeast from its channel. It is located about 46 kilometers (29 mi) to the SSW of lake Maraldy and 30 kilometers (19 mi) to the WNW of lake Borly.

The shores are mostly sloping and on the northern and southern sides there are sections with up to 6 meters (20 ft) high cliffs. Several small rivulets flow into the lake, but there is no outflow. The lake does not freeze in winter owing to high salinity.

== Flora and fauna ==
Lake Kalatuz is surrounded by sandy soil with steppe vegetation.

== See also ==
- List of lakes of Kazakhstan
