= Kyzyltuz (Akkuly District) =

Lake in Kazakhstan

- Қызылтұз
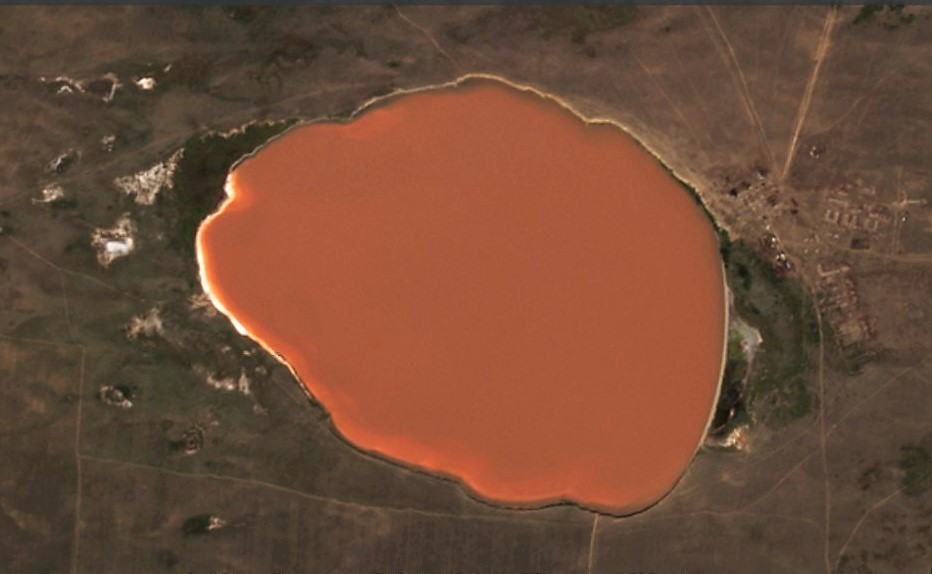
- Sentinel-2 picture of the lake

- Location within Kazakhstan
- Location: Kulunda Plain
- Coordinates: 51°40′00″N 78°11′07″E
- Type: Salt lake
- Catchment area: 186 square kilometers (72 sq mi)
- Basin countries: Kazakhstan
- Max. length: 3.2 kilometers (2.0 mi)
- Max. width: 2.4 kilometers (1.5 mi)
- Surface area: 5.7 square kilometers (2.2 sq mi)
- Average depth: 0.7 meters (2 ft 4 in)
- Water volume: 0.0022 cubic kilometers (0.00053 cu mi)
- Residence time: UTC+6
- Shore length^{1}: 8.8 kilometers (5.5 mi)
- Surface elevation: 136 meters (446 ft)
- Islands: none
- ^{1} Shore length is not a well-defined measure.

Kyzyltuz (Kazakh: Қызылтұз; Russian: Кызылтуз) is a salt lake in Akkuly District, Pavlodar Region, Kazakhstan.

== Location ==
The lake is located 17 kilometers (11 mi) to the west of Malybay village, about 60 kilometers (37 mi) west of the Russia-Kazakhstan border. Akkuly, the district capital, lies 34 kilometers (21 mi) to the southwest.

== Geography ==
Kyzyltuz is part of the Irtysh basin. It lies in a tectonic depression of the Kulunda Plain. Lake Borli lies 20 kilometers (12 mi) to the northwest, Kazy 6 kilometers (3.7 mi) to the WNW, Zhaltyr and Malybay 1.5 kilometers (0.93 mi) to the ESE, Sharbakty 28 kilometers (17 mi) to the south, and Seiten 27 kilometers (17 mi) to the NNW.

The lake has a striking red color. This is in clear contrast with the other lakes in the area which display blue or green hues. The northern shore of Kyzyltuz is rocky.

== Flora and fauna ==
Lake Kyzyltuz is surrounded by steppe vegetation. Reeds grow in some stretches of the lakeshore.

== See also ==
- List of lakes of Kazakhstan
