= Seiten =

Lake in Kazakhstan

- Сейтен
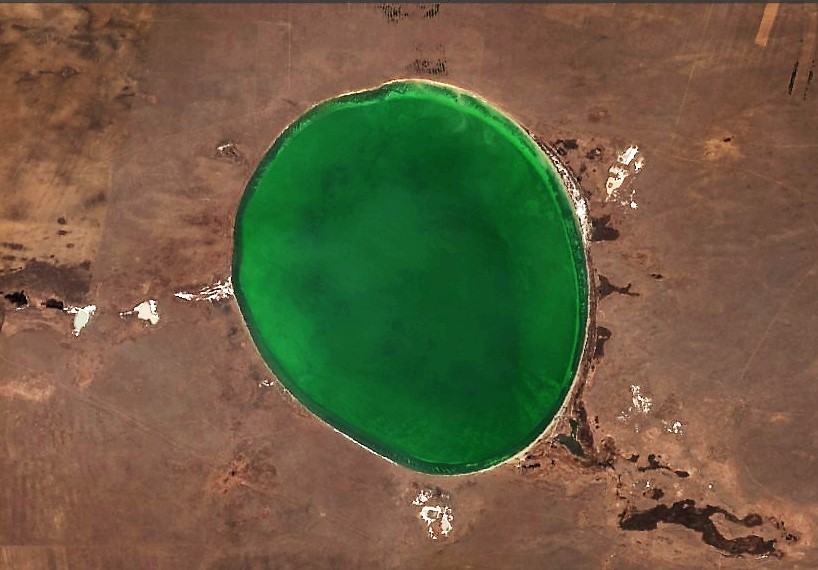
- Sentinel-2 picture of the lake

- Location within Kazakhstan
- Location: Kulunda Plain
- Coordinates: 51°56′12″N 78°07′04″E
- Type: Salt lake
- Catchment area: 773 square kilometers (298 sq mi)
- Basin countries: Kazakhstan
- Max. length: 5.4 kilometers (3.4 mi)
- Max. width: 4.4 kilometers (2.7 mi)
- Surface area: 15.8 square kilometers (6.1 sq mi)
- Average depth: 2 meters (6 ft 7 in)
- Shore length^{1}: 19.2 kilometers (11.9 mi)
- Surface elevation: 138 meters (453 ft)
- Islands: none
- ^{1} Shore length is not a well-defined measure.

Seiten or Seyten (Kazakh: Сейтен) is a salt lake in Sharbakty District, Pavlodar Region, Kazakhstan.

The lake lies 14 kilometers (8.7 mi) to the southwest of Chigirinovka village, about 60 kilometers (37 mi) west of the Russia-Kazakhstan border.

== Geography ==
Seiten is part of the Irtysh basin. It lies in a tectonic depression of the Kulunda Plain, about 50 kilometers (31 mi) to the SSE of lake Maraldy. Lake Borli lies 10 kilometers (6.2 mi) to the southwest, Kazy 22 kilometers (14 mi) to the south, Kyzyltuz 26 kilometers (16 mi) to the SSE, and Bargana 55 kilometers (34 mi) to the ESE.

The shape of the lake is almost round and its shore is steep all around, with cliffs rising to heights between 3 meters (9.8 ft) and 13 meters (43 ft). The water of the lake is bitter, not suitable for agricultural purposes. Seiten does not dry out in the summer and does not freeze in the winter.

== Flora and fauna ==
Lake Seiten is surrounded by steppe vegetation.

== See also ==
- List of lakes of Kazakhstan
