= Sharbakty (lake) =

Lake in Kazakhstan

- Шарбақты
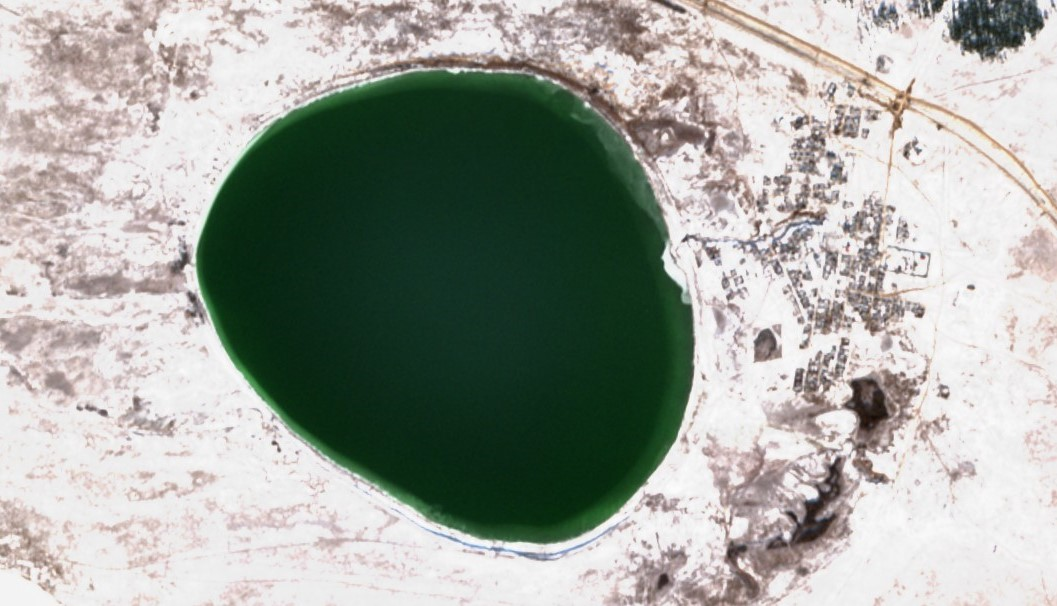
- Sentinel-2 picture of lake Sharbakty and the lakeshore village (right).

- Location within Kazakhstan
- Location: Kulunda Plain
- Coordinates: 51°23′16″N 78°15′41″E
- Type: Salt lake
- Basin countries: Kazakhstan
- Max. length: 3.1 kilometers (1.9 mi)
- Max. width: 2.7 kilometers (1.7 mi)
- Surface area: 6.8 square kilometers (2.6 sq mi)
- Residence time: UTC+6
- Surface elevation: 129 meters (423 ft)
- Islands: none
- Settlements: Sharbakty

Sharbakty (Kazakh: Шарбақты; Russian: Щербакты) is a salt lake in Akkuly District, Pavlodar Region, Kazakhstan.

The lake is about 80 kilometers (50 mi) west of the Russia-Kazakhstan border. Akkuly, the district capital, is 32 kilometers (20 mi) to the WNW.

== Geography ==
Sharbakty is an endorheic lake part of the Irtysh basin. It lies in a tectonic depression of the Kulunda Plain. Toleuberdy (Толеуберды), a small lake, is located 1.6 kilometers (0.99 mi) from the southwestern shore. Lake Uyaly lies 5 kilometers (3.1 mi) to the south, Malybay 24 kilometers (15 mi) to the north and red lake Kyzyltuz 28 kilometers (17 mi) to the NNW. River Irtysh flows 18 kilometers (11 mi) to the southwest.

The lake has a regular, almost round, shape. It doesn't dry out in the summer and doesn't freeze in the winter. Sharbakty village lies by the eastern lakeshore. The M38 Highway from the Border of Russia to Pavlodar and Semey (Semipalatinsk), passes near the northern end of the lake.

== Flora and fauna ==
Lake Sharbakty is surrounded by steppe vegetation.

== See also ==
- List of lakes of Kazakhstan
