= Borli =

Lake in Kazakhstan

- Борли
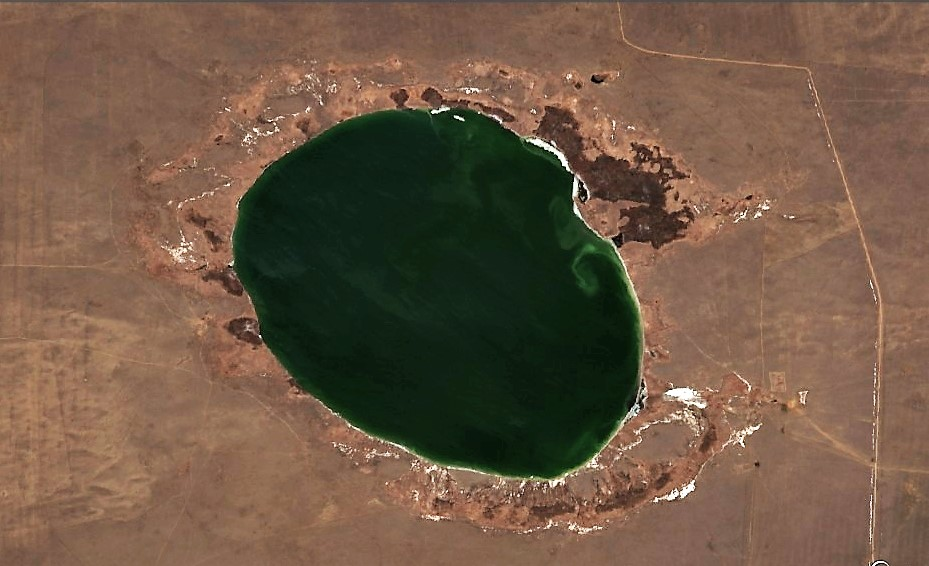
- Sentinel-2 picture of the lake

- Location within Kazakhstan
- Location: Kulunda Plain
- Coordinates: 51°49′34″N 77°58′58″E
- Type: Alkaline lake
- Basin countries: Kazakhstan
- Max. length: 5.3 kilometers (3.3 mi)
- Max. width: 4.2 kilometers (2.6 mi)
- Surface area: 16.3 square kilometers (6.3 sq mi)
- Residence time: UTC+6
- Surface elevation: 117 meters (384 ft)
- Islands: none

Borli (Kazakh: Борли) is an alkaline lake in Akkuly District, Pavlodar Region, Kazakhstan.

The lake lies 40 kilometers (25 mi) to the NNE of Akkuly, the district capital, and about 80 kilometers (50 mi) southeast of Pavlodar, the regional capital.

== Geography ==
Borly is part of the Irtysh basin. It lies in a tectonic depression of the Kulunda Plain, about 48 kilometers (30 mi) to the SSE of lake Maraldy. Lake Seiten lies 10 kilometers (6.2 mi) to the northeast, Kalatuz 30 kilometers (19 mi) to the WNW, close to the Irtysh, Kazy 11 kilometers (6.8 mi) to the SSE, Kyzyltuz 18 kilometers (11 mi) to the southeast, and Bargana 61 kilometers (38 mi) to the east.

The shape of the lake is almost oval, oriented in a northwest - southeast direction. Its water is alkaline, with a pH of more than 9, only matched by lake Uyaly further south. The total salinity is less than 60 grams per liter (9.6 oz/imp gal). Lake Borly does not dry out in the summer and does not freeze in the winter.

== Flora and fauna ==
Lake Borli is surrounded by steppe vegetation.

== See also ==
- List of soda lakes
