= Yam (route) =

Postal service system originating from the Mongol period

The yam or jam (Russian: ям), also called the örtöö (Mongolian: өртөө, lit. 'checkpoint'), was a Mongol postal system or supply point route messenger system. It was extensively used and expanded by Ögedei Khan and also used by subsequent khans and great khans.

Relay stations provided food, shelter and spare horses for Mongol army messengers. Ögedei Khan gave special attention to the yam because Mongol armies traveled quickly; their messengers had to be even faster, and they covered 200–300 kilometres (120–190 mi) per day. The system was used to speed up the process of information and intelligence.

The system was preserved in Russia after the disintegration of the Golden Horde in the 15th century.

== Etymology ==
The name yam dates back to the Tuoba period; the word ghiamchin ("post station staff") in the Tuoba language is related to the Mongolian word jamuchin and they both have the same meaning. The postal system had already been used for a long time by nomadic and semi-nomadic peoples. In addition, the Song, Liao and Jin dynasties had already maintained a system of posts in northern China; therefore, it is believed that the Mongol yam originated from the systems found in the Eurasian Steppe and in northern China.

== Mongol yam ==
According to The Secret History of the Mongols, the yam was founded by Ögedei Khan. Other sources show that a rudimentary postal system had already existed during the reign of Genghis Khan. The Secret History and some Persian sources credit Ögedei with installing post stations across the Mongol Empire. As the Mongols expanded into northern China, the existing Jin posts were incorporated into the yam system.

The yam operated with a chain of relay stations at certain distances to each other, usually around 20–40 miles (32–64 km) apart. A messenger would arrive at a station and give his information to another messenger, and meanwhile rest and let the other messenger go on to the next station to hand the document to yet another messenger. This way information or documents were constantly on the move without each messenger getting tired. In each relay station, there would be spare horses, food, and shelter.

The service has been described in great detail by European travelers including Giovanni da Pian del Carpine, William of Rubruck, Marco Polo, and Odoric of Pordenone. While it was not the first messenger system in history (earlier ones existed in the Persian and Roman Empires), it was unprecedented in size and efficiency. As the yam was constantly expanding, the Mongol war routes were transformed into commercial routes. People and messages could be sent from Korea to Persia or Mongolia to Vietnam through the use of horses or camel caravans.

The Mongols replaced the old system of tax collection in Russia with a new one. After the death of Alexander Nevsky in 1263, the new grand prince allowed the Novgorodians to organize their own system of tax collection, as long as payments to the Mongols continued. At first, the Mongols sent their own tax collectors. To keep Russian nobles on their side, although the nobles paid taxes, they were allowed to keep their lands and their authority in local politics was respected. Post roads with fixed stations were built after 1300 when the Mongols changed their method of having resident agents (known as basqaq) to sending envoys whenever the tribute needed to be collected.

== Russian yam ==
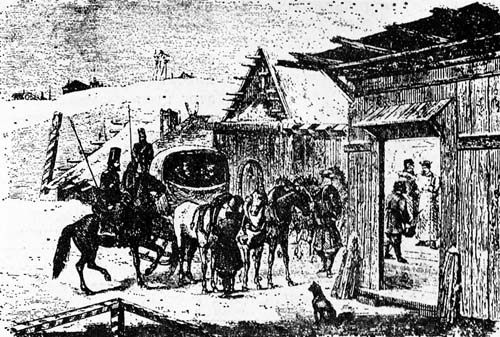
Yam station in Achinsk, 19th century

The system was preserved in Russia after the disintegration of the Golden Horde in the 15th century, as a means of fast governmental communication and later for use in the postal service, called the yam courier service. It was implemented in the form of yam duty levied onto both urban and rural populations. It was controlled by a yamskoy prikaz. The coachman performing the yam service was called a yamshchik.

The word yam was adopted by the Russians. Many major Russian cities had whole suburbs and villages (sloboda) settled by yamshchiki and were called yamskaya sloboda. A number of places existing along the old roads retain the word yam in their names, such as Yam-Tyosovo or Gavrilov-Yam. To the east of the Irtysh River, Lake Yamysh, which is derived from the word yam, was likely a post in the Mongols' yam system in prior centuries and it supplied salt to the city of Tobolsk.

== See also ==
- Inca road system
- Pony Express
- Royal Road
- Stage station

== Sources ==
- Favereau, Marie (20 April 2021). The Horde: How the Mongols Changed the World. Harvard University Press. ISBN 978-0-674-24421-4.
- Lane, George (25 January 2018). A Short History of the Mongols. Bloomsbury Publishing. ISBN 978-1-78673-339-9.
- Shim, Hosung (7 November 2016). "Yam". In May, Timothy (ed.). The Mongol Empire: A Historical Encyclopedia [2 volumes]. Bloomsbury Publishing USA. pp. 110–112. ISBN 979-8-216-11905-0.
- Weatherford, Jack (22 March 2005). Genghis Khan and the Making of the Modern World. Crown. ISBN 978-0-307-23781-1.
