= Soda lake =

Lake that is strongly alkaline

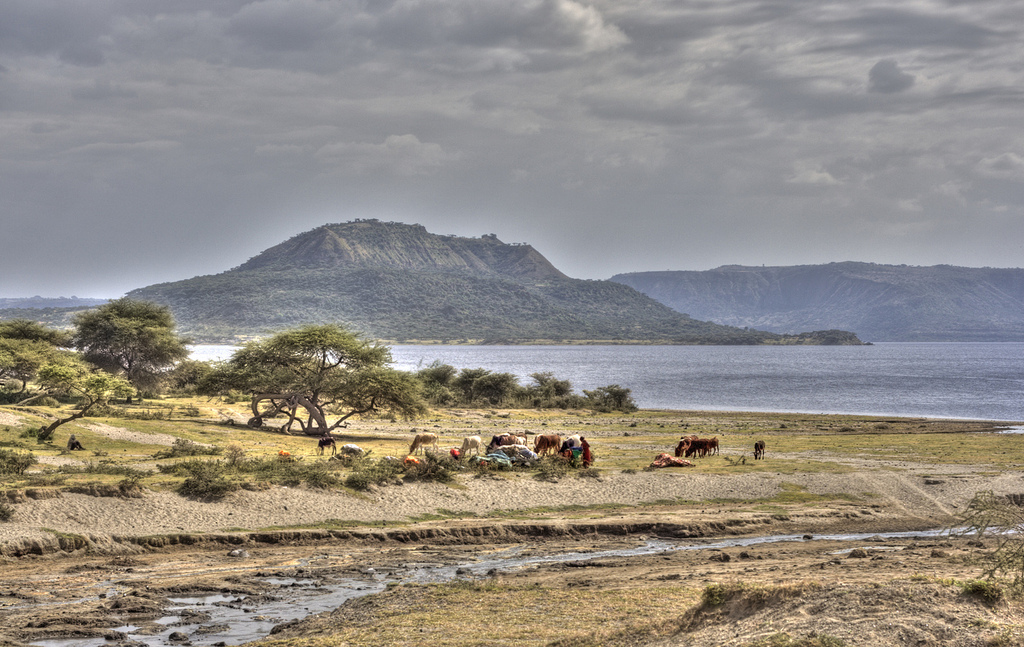
Lake Shala, in the East African Rift Valley

A soda lake, or alkaline lake, is a lake on the strongly basic side of neutrality, typically with a pH value between 9 and 12. They are characterized by high concentrations of carbonate salts, typically sodium carbonate (and related salt complexes), giving rise to their alkalinity. In addition, many soda lakes also contain high concentrations of sodium chloride and other dissolved salts, making them saline or hypersaline lakes as well. High pH and salinity often coincide, because of how soda lakes develop. (Note: See "Geology, geochemistry and genesis".) The resulting hypersaline and highly alkaline soda lakes are considered some of the most extreme aquatic environments on Earth.

In spite of their apparent inhospitability, soda lakes are often highly productive ecosystems, compared to their (pH-neutral) freshwater counterparts. Gross primary production (photosynthesis) rates above 10 g C m^{−2} day^{−1} (grams of carbon per square meter per day), over 16 times the global average for lakes and streams (0.6 g C m^{−2} day^{−1}), have been measured. This makes them the most productive aquatic environments on Earth. An important reason for the high productivity is the virtually unlimited availability of dissolved carbon dioxide.

Soda lakes occur naturally throughout the world (see table below), typically in arid and semi-arid areas and in connection to tectonic rifts like the East African Rift Valley. The pH of most freshwater lakes is on the alkaline side of neutrality and many exhibit similar water chemistries to soda lakes, only less extreme.

== Geology, geochemistry and genesis ==
In order for a lake to become alkalic, a special combination of geographical, geological and climatic conditions are required. First of all, a suitable topography is needed, that limits the outflow of water from the lake. When the outflow is completely prevented, this is called an endorheic basin. Craters or depressions formed by tectonic rifting often provide such topological depressions.
There are exceptions to the "no outlet" rule: both Lake Kivu and Lake Tanganyika have outlets but also have the characteristics of soda lakes, and Lake Tanganyika even grows microbialites.

The high alkalinity and salinity arise through evaporation of the lake water. This requires suitable climatic conditions, in order for the inflow to balance outflow through evaporation. The rate at which carbonate salts are dissolved into the lake water also depends on the surrounding geology and can in some cases lead to relatively high alkalinity even in lakes with significant outflow.

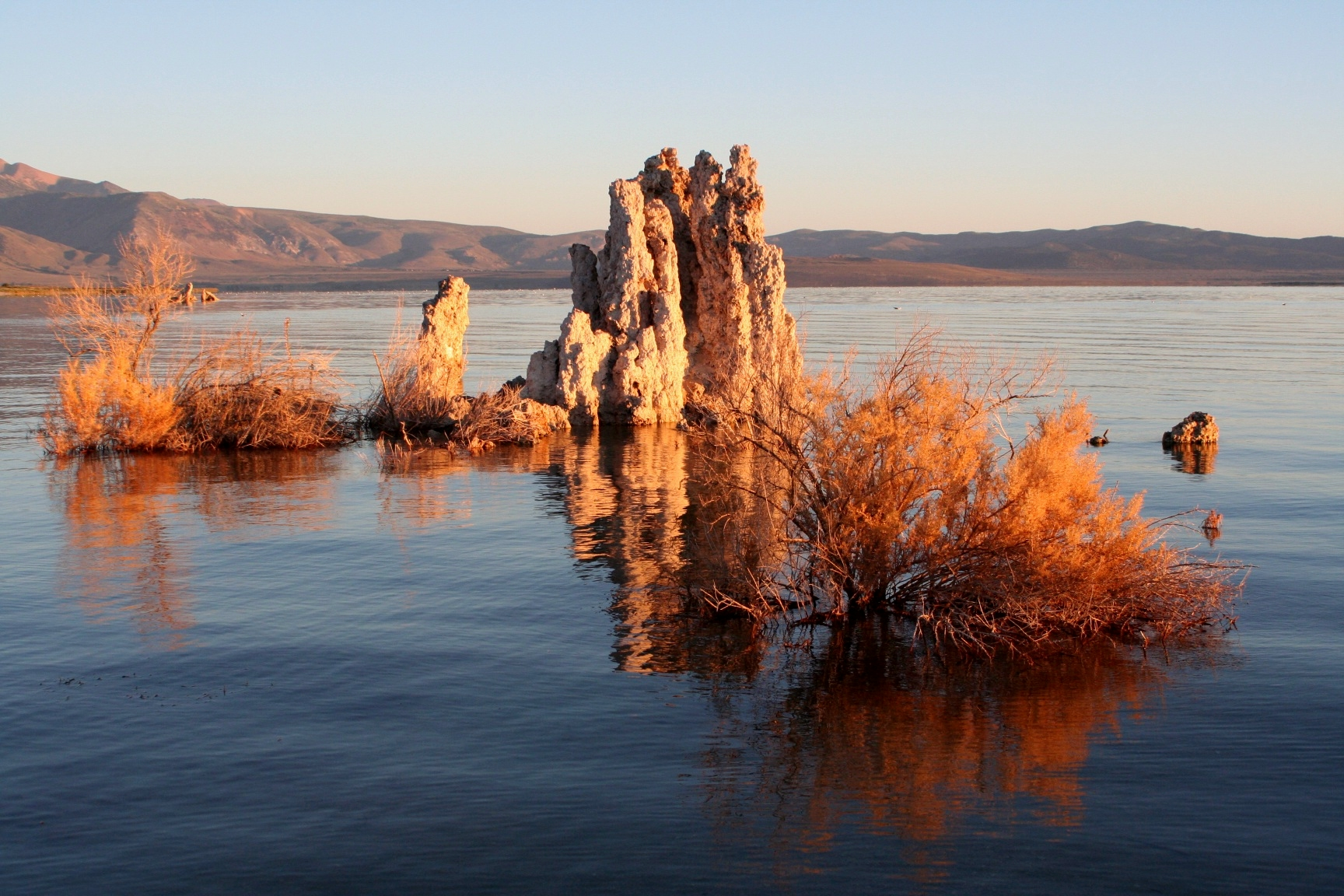
Tufa columns at Mono Lake, California

Another critical geological condition for the formation of a soda lake is the relative absence of soluble magnesium or calcium. Otherwise, dissolved magnesium (Mg^{2+}) or calcium (Ca^{2+}) will quickly remove the carbonate ions, through the precipitation of minerals such as calcite, magnesite or dolomite, effectively neutralizing the pH of the lake water. This results in a neutral (or slightly basic) salt lake instead. A good example is the Dead Sea, which is very rich in Mg^{2+}. In some soda lakes, inflow of Ca^{2+} through subterranean seeps, can lead to localized precipitation. In Mono Lake, California and Lake Van, Turkey, such precipitation has formed columns of tufa rising above the lake surface.

Many soda lakes are strongly stratified, with a well-oxygenated upper layer (epilimnion) and an anoxic lower layer (hypolimnion), without oxygen and often high concentrations of sulfide. Stratification can be permanent, or with seasonal mixing. The depth of the oxic/anoxic interface separating the two layers varies from a few centimeters to near the bottom sediments, depending on local conditions. In either case, it represents an important barrier, both physically and between strongly contrasting biochemical conditions.

== Biodiversity ==
A rich diversity of microbial life inhabit soda lakes, often in dense concentrations. This makes them unusually productive ecosystems and leads to permanent or seasonal "algae blooms" with visible colouration in many lakes. The colour varies between particular lakes, depending on their predominant life forms and can range from green to orange or red.

Compared to freshwater ecosystems, life in soda lakes is often completely dominated by prokaryotes, i.e. bacteria and archaea, particularly in those with more "extreme" conditions (higher alkalinity and salinity, or lower oxygen content). However, a rich diversity of eukaryotic algae, protists and fungi have also been encountered in many soda lakes.

Multicellular animals such as crustaceans (notably the brine shrimp Artemia and the copepod Paradiaptomus africanus) and fish (e.g. Alcolapia), are also found in many of the less extreme soda lakes, adapted to the extreme conditions of these alkalic and often saline environments. Particularly in the East African Rift Valley, microorganisms in soda lakes also provide the main food source for vast flocks of the lesser flamingo (Phoeniconaias minor). The cyanobacteria of the genus Arthrospira (formerly Spirulina) are a particularly preferred food source for these birds, owing to their large cell size and high nutritional value. Declines in East African soda lake productivity due to rising water levels threaten this food source. This may force lesser flamingos to move north and south, away from the equator.

=== Microbial diversity surveys and species richness ===
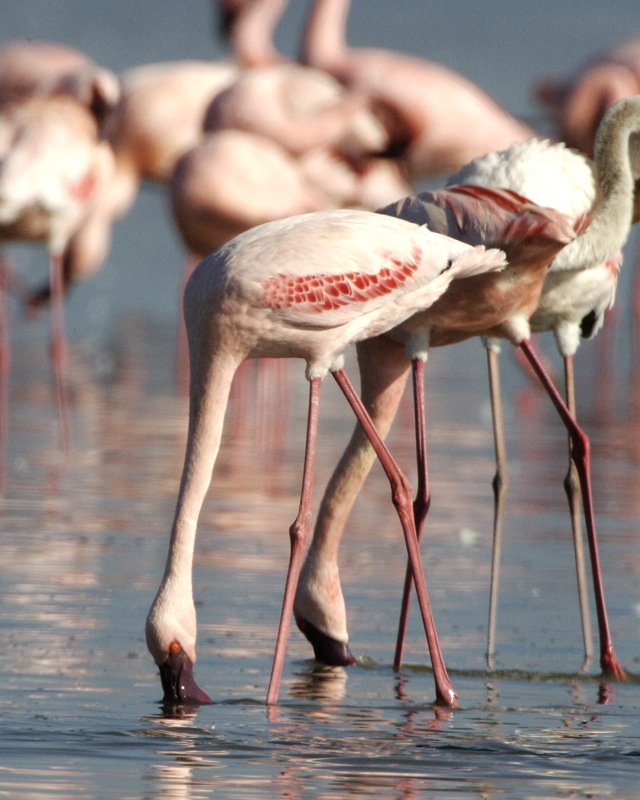
Lesser flamingos (Phoenicopterus minor) feeding on cyanobacteria in Lake Nakuru, Kenya

In general, the microbial biodiversity of soda lakes is relatively poorly studied. Many studies have focused on the primary producers, namely the photosynthesizing cyanobacteria or eukaryotic algae (see Carbon cycle). As studies have traditionally relied on microscopy, identification has been hindered by the fact that many soda lakes harbour poorly studied species, unique to these relatively unusual habitats and in many cases thought to be endemic, i.e. existing only in one lake. The morphology (appearance) of algae and other organisms may also vary from lake to lake, depending on local conditions, making their identification more difficult, which has probably led to several instances of taxonomic confusions in the scientific literature.

Since 2006, a number of studies have used molecular methods such as DNA fingerprinting or sequencing to study the diversity of organisms in soda lakes. These methods are based on DNA extracted directly from the environment and thus do not require microorganisms to be cultured. This is a major advantage, as culturing of novel microorganisms is a laborious technique known to seriously bias the outcome of diversity studies, since only about one in a hundred organisms can be cultured using standard techniques. For microorganisms, the phylogenetic marker gene small subunit (SSU) ribosomal RNA is typically targeted, due to its good properties such as existence in all cellular organisms and ability to be used as a "molecular clock" to trace the evolutionary history of an organism. For instance, 16S ribosomal RNA gene clone libraries revealed that the bacterial community of the lake with the highest salinity was characterized by a higher recent accelerated diversification than the community of a freshwater lake, whereas the phylogenetic diversity in the hypersaline lake was lower than that in a freshwater lake. Culture-independent surveys have revealed that the diversity of microorganisms in soda lakes is very high, with species richness (number of species present) of individual lakes often rivaling that of freshwater ecosystems.

=== Biogeography and uniqueness ===
In addition to their rich biodiversity, soda lakes often harbour many unique species, adapted to alkalic conditions and unable to live in environments with neutral pH. These are called alkaliphiles. Organisms also adapted to high salinity are called haloalkaliphiles. Culture-independent genetic surveys have shown that soda lakes contain an unusually high amount of alkaliphilic microorganisms with low genetic similarity to known species. This indicates a long evolutionary history of adaptation to these habitats with few new species from other environments becoming adapted over time.

In-depth genetic surveys also show an unusually low overlap in the microbial community present, between soda lakes with slightly different conditions such as pH and salinity. This trend is especially strong in the bottom layer (hypolimnion) of stratified lakes, probably because of the isolated character of such environments. Diversity data from soda lakes suggest the existence of many endemic microbial species, unique to individual lakes. This is a controversial finding, since conventional wisdom in microbial ecology dictates that most microbial species are cosmopolitan and dispersed globally, thanks to their enormous population sizes, a famous hypothesis first formulated by Lourens Baas Becking in 1934 ("Everything is everywhere, but the environment selects").

== Ecology ==
=== Carbon cycle ===
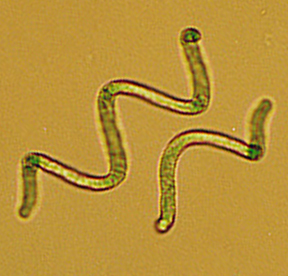
Cyanobacteria of the genus Arthrospira (synonymous to "Spirulina")

Photosynthesis provides the primary energy source for life in soda lakes and this process dominates the activity at the surface. The most important photosynthesizers are typically cyanobacteria, but in many less "extreme" soda lakes, eukaryotes such as green algae (Chlorophyta) can also dominate. Major genera of cyanobacteria typically found in soda lakes include Arthrospira (formerly Spirulina) (notably A. platensis), Anabaenopsis, Cyanospira, Synechococcus or Chroococcus. In more saline soda lakes, haloalkaliphilic archaea such as Halobacteria and bacteria such as Halorhodospira dominate photosynthesis. However, it is not clear whether this is an autotrophic process or if these require organic carbon from cyanobacterial blooms, occurring during periods of heavy rainfall that dilute the surface waters.

Below the surface, anoxygenic photosynthesizers using other substances than carbon dioxide for photosynthesis also contribute to primary production in many soda lakes. These include purple sulfur bacteria such as Ectothiorhodospiraceae and purple non-sulfur bacteria such as Rhodobacteraceae (for example the species Rhodobaca bogoriensis isolated from Lake Bogoria).

The photosynthesizing bacteria provide a food source for a vast diversity of aerobic and anaerobic organotrophic microorganisms from phyla including Pseudomonadota, Bacteroidota, Spirochaetota, Bacillota, Thermotogota, Deinococcota, Planctomycetota, Actinomycetota, Gemmatimonadota, and more. The stepwise anaerobic fermentation of organic compounds originating from the primary producers, results in one-carbon (C1) compounds such as methanol and methylamine.

At the bottom of lakes (in the sediment or hypolimnion, methanogens use these compounds to derive energy, by producing methane, a procedure known as methanogenesis. A diversity of methanogens including the archaeal genera Methanocalculus, Methanolobus, Methanosaeta, Methanosalsus and Methanoculleus have been found in soda lake sediments. When the resulting methane reaches the aerobic water of a soda lake, it can be consumed by methane-oxidizing bacteria such as Methylobacter or Methylomicrobium.

=== Sulfur cycle ===
Sulfur-reducing bacteria are common in anoxic layers of soda lakes. These reduce sulfate and organic sulfur from dead cells into sulfide (S^{2−}). Anoxic layers of soda lakes are therefore often rich in sulfide. As opposed to neutral lakes, the high pH prohibits the release of hydrogen sulfide (H_{2}S) in gas form. Genera of alkaliphilic sulfur-reducers found in soda lakes include Desulfonatronovibrio and Desulfonatronum. These also play important an ecological role besides in the cycling of sulfur, as they also consume hydrogen, resulting from the fermentation of organic matter.

Sulfur-oxidating bacteria instead derive their energy from oxidation of the sulfide reaching the oxygenated layers of soda lakes. Some of these are photosynthetic sulfur phototrophs, which means that they also require light to derive energy. Examples of alkaliphilic sulfur-oxidizing bacteria are the genera Thioalkalivibrio, Thiorhodospira, Thioalkalimicrobium and Natronhydrogenobacter.

=== Nitrogen and other nutrients ===
Nitrogen is a limiting nutrient for growth in many soda lakes, making the internal nitrogen cycle very important for their ecological functioning. One possible source of bio-available nitrogen is diazotrophic cyanobacteria, which can fix nitrogen from the atmosphere during photosynthesis. However, many of the dominant cyanobacteria found in soda lakes such as Arthrospira are probably not able to fix nitrogen. Ammonia, a nitrogen-containing waste product from degradation of dead cells, can be lost from soda lakes through volatilization because of the high pH. This can hinder nitrification, in which ammonia is "recycled" to the bio-available form nitrate. However, ammonia oxidation seems to be efficiently carried out in soda lakes in either case, probably by ammonia-oxidizing bacteria as well as Thaumarchaea.

=== Climate change ===
Changes in the biogeochemical cycling of soda lakes occur with seasonal variation and the availability of nutrients (eutrophic status). These cycling changes, involving the increased availability of organic carbon from high photosynthetic rates (like during and after cyanobacterial blooms), can increase the productivity of methanogenic microbes (see Carbon cycle) and increase the emission of methane, a notable greenhouse gas, from soda lakes. This interaction between carbon metabolism and methane production may be a characteristic biogeochemical process in soda lakes, and makes them a significant contributor of biogenic greenhouse gas, like wetlands.

The productivity of soda lakes may decrease in response to increased rainfall due to climate change. Rising water levels disrupt their ecology and have occurred alongside a decline in phytoplankton productivity, most notably in east Africa. Conversely, increased temperatures and evaporation at other lakes, most notably in the Western hemisphere, threaten to both reduce water levels and increase their productivity through microbial blooms, resulting in the exacerbation of aforementioned greenhouse gas emissions and a reduction in biodiversity.

The ecological future of soda lakes remains uncertain as they maintain a delicate microbial ecology and are highly susceptible to anthropogenic climate change. While the long-term impacts of this continual change are yet unclear with respect to their biodiversity, as shifts in microbial fauna occur and productivity changes, the habitat availability of notable migratory species like the Lesser Flamingo in East Africa is subject to change.

== List of soda lakes ==
Photos of alkaline lakes

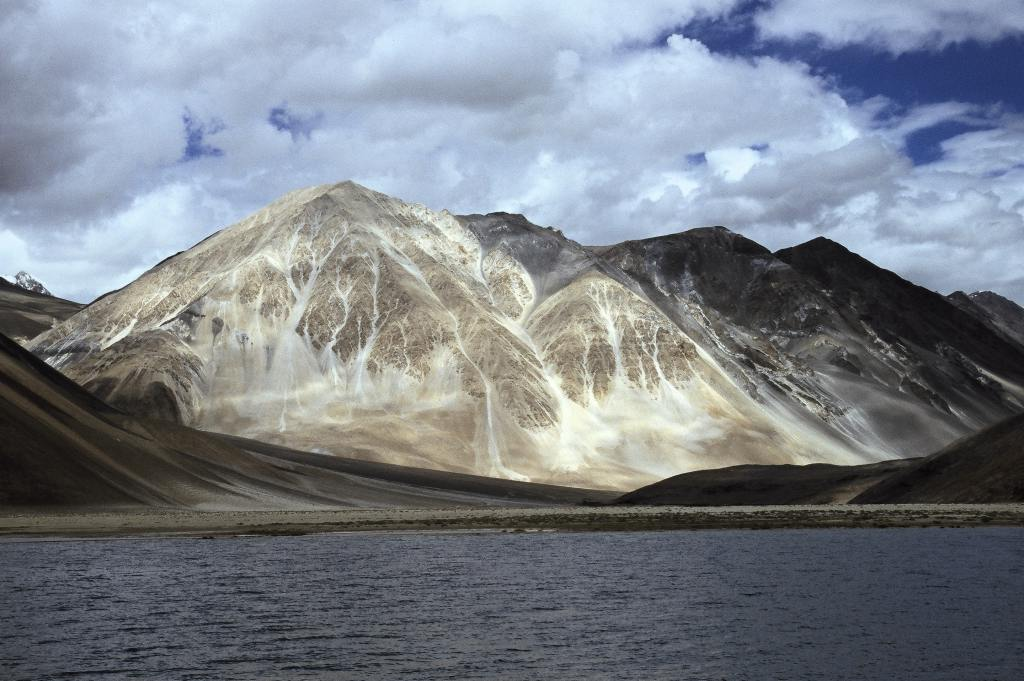
Pangong Lake, India and Tibet, China

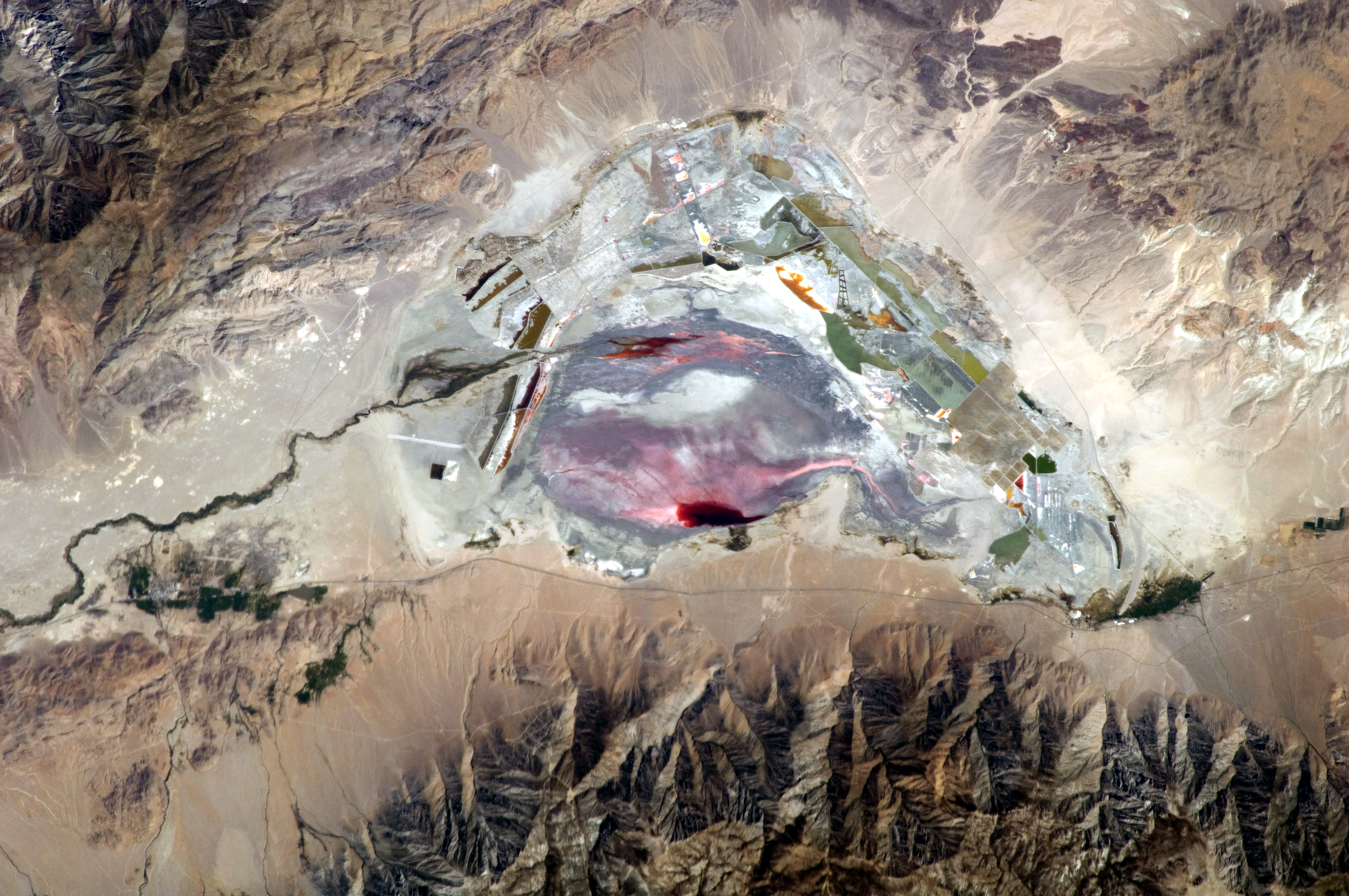
Astronaut photograph of the mostly dry bed of Owens Lake, California, US

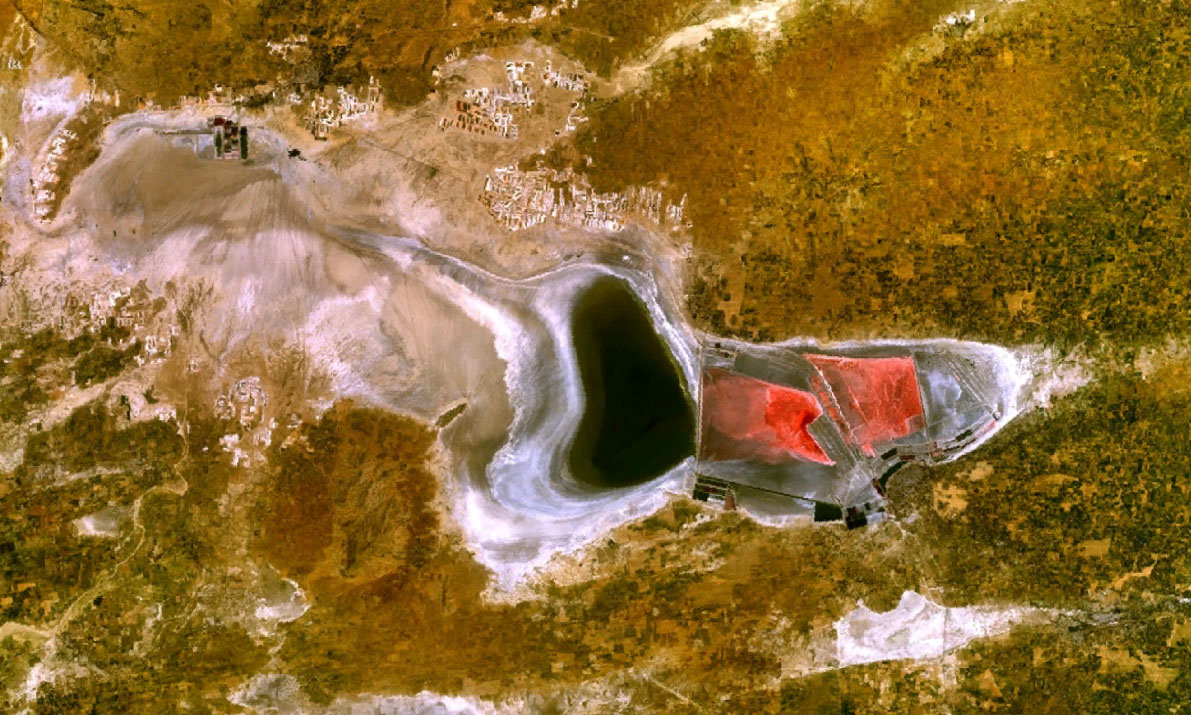
2010 satellite image of Sambhar Salt Lake, India

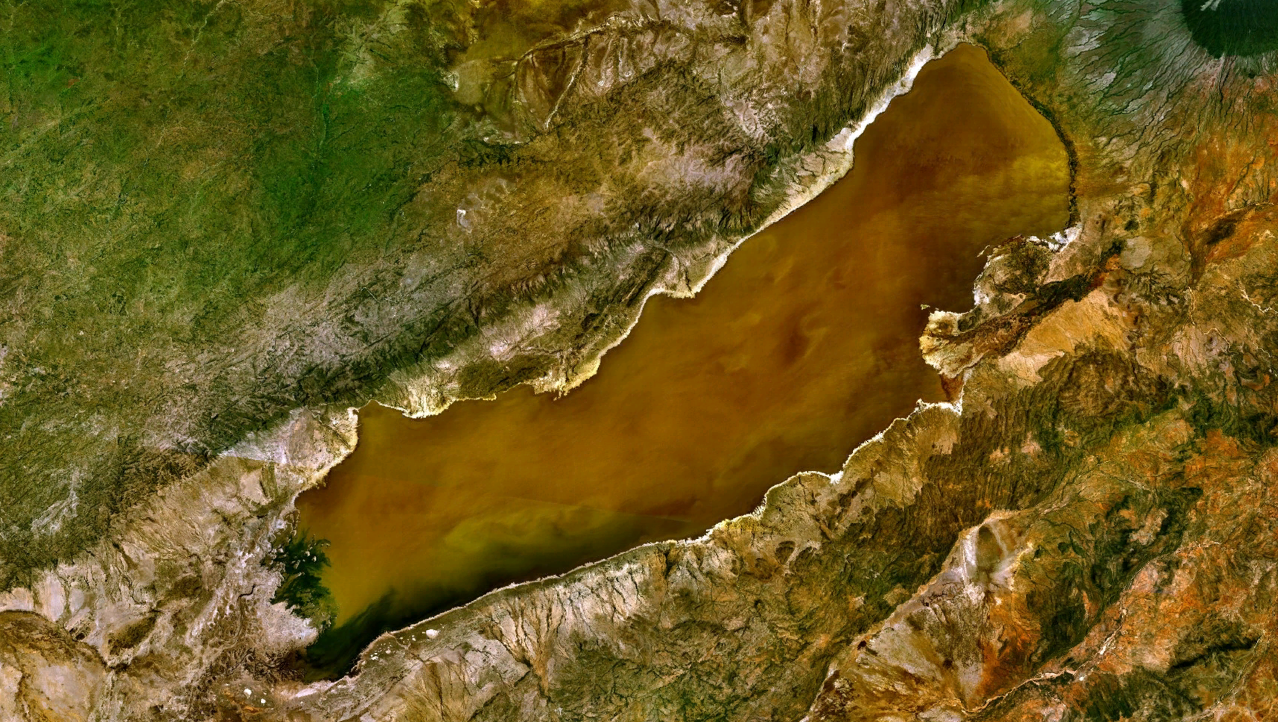
Lake Eyasi, Tanzania

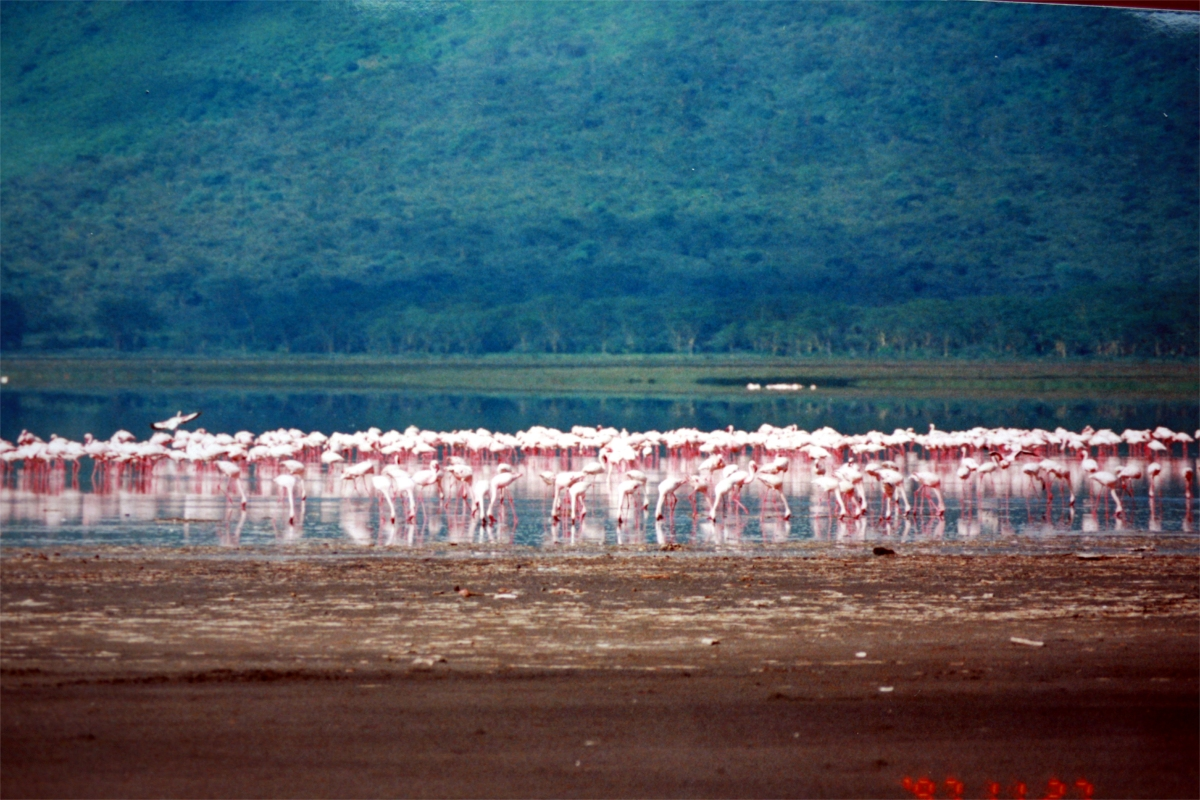
Flamingos feeding at Lake Nakuru, Kenya

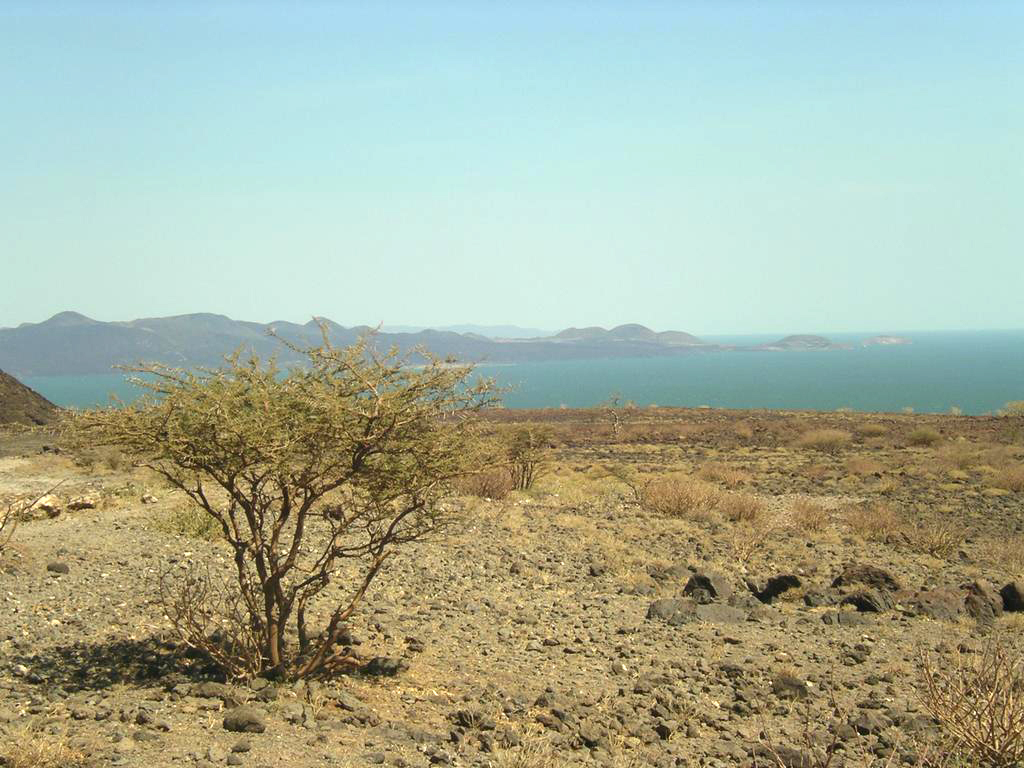
Lake Turkana, Kenya

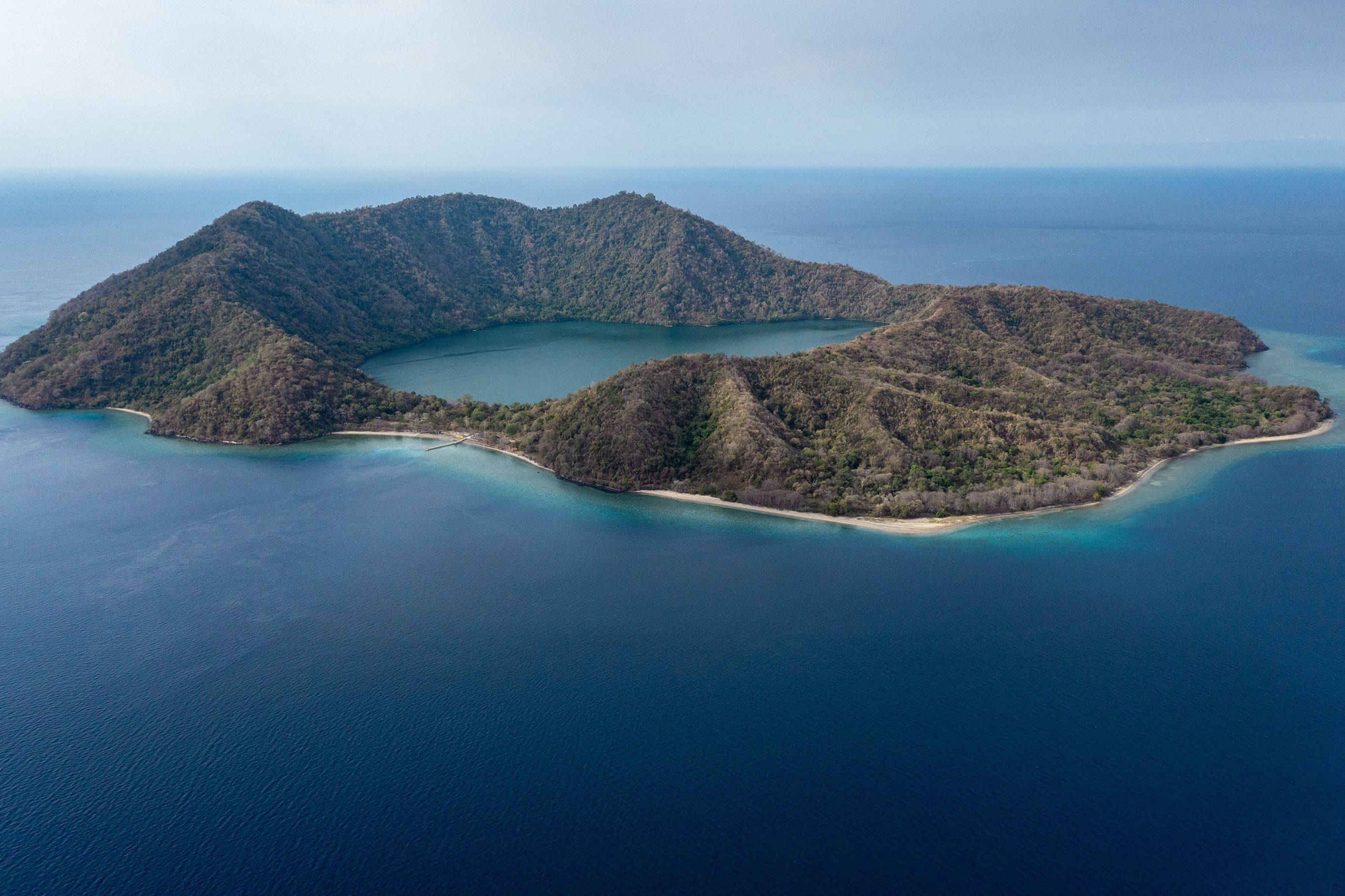
Satonda Island lake, Indonesia

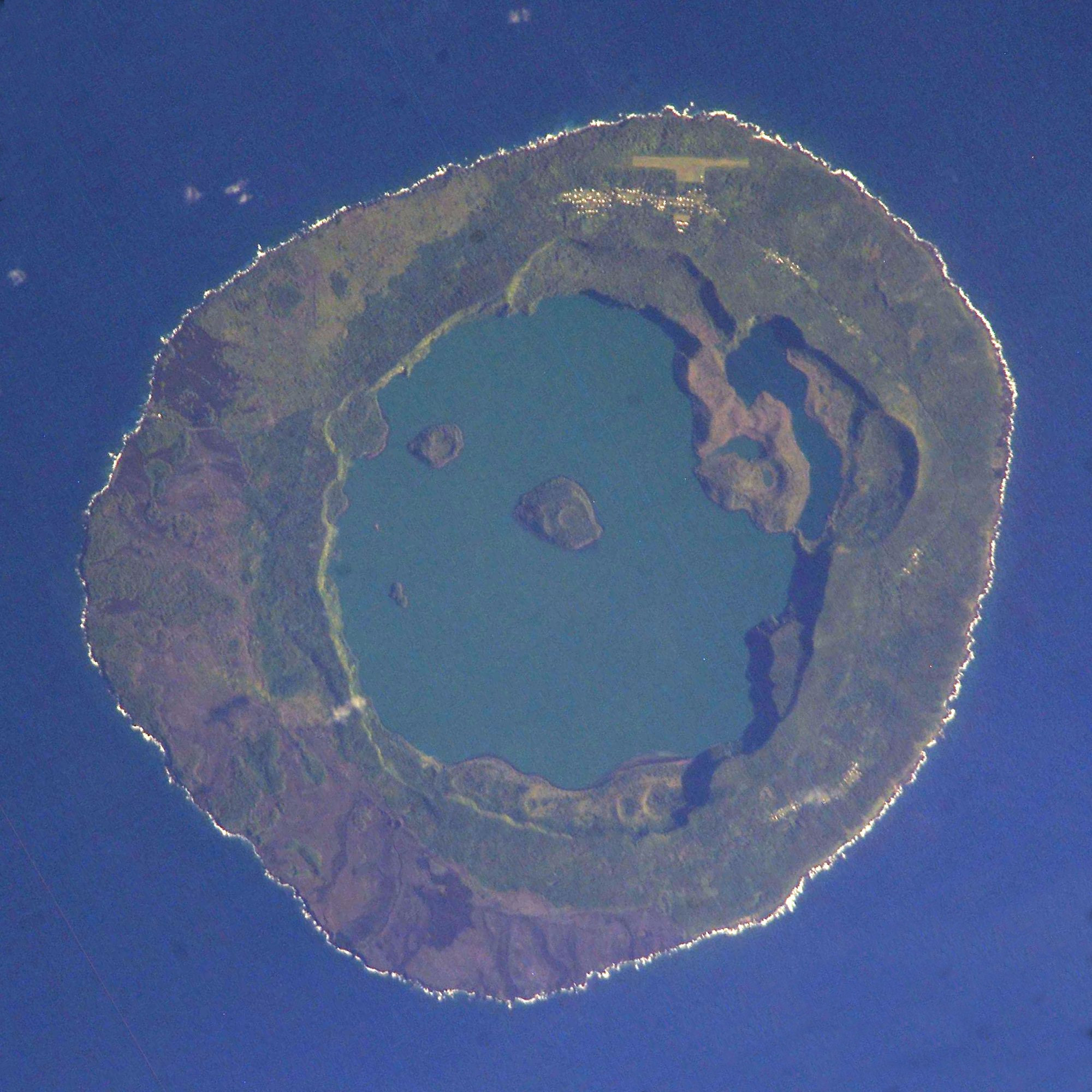
Niuafo'ou lake, Tonga

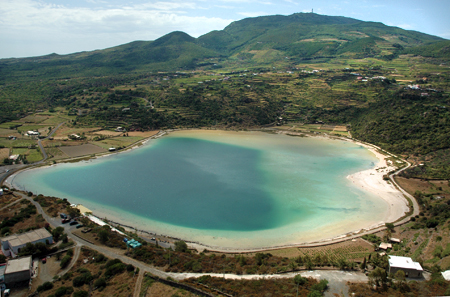
Lake Specchio di Venere, Pantelleria island, Italy

The following table lists some examples of soda lakes by region, listing country, pH and salinity. NA indicates 'data not available':

Continent	Name	Country	pH	Salinity
Africa	Lake Ngami	Botswana		
Africa	Sua Pan	Botswana		19%
Africa	Rombou Lake	Chad	10.2	2%
Africa	Wadi El Natrun lakes	Egypt	9.5	5%
Africa	Lake Arenguadi (Green Lake)	Ethiopia	9.5–9.9	0.25%
Africa	Lake Basaka	Ethiopia	9.6	0.3%
Africa	Lake Shala	Ethiopia	9.8	1.8%
Africa	Lake Abijatta	Ethiopia	9.9	3.4%
Africa	Lake Chitu	Ethiopia	10.3	5.8%
Africa	Lake Bogoria	Kenya	10.5	3.5%
Africa	Empakai Crater lake	Kenya		
Africa	Lake Logipi	Kenya	9.5–10.5	2–5%
Africa	Lake Magadi	Kenya	10	>10%
Africa	Lake Nakuru	Kenya	10.5	NA
Africa	Lake Sonachi (Crater Lake)	Kenya	NA	NA
Africa	Lake Turkana	Kenya	8.5–9.2	0.25%
Africa	Malha Crater Lake	Sudan	9.5–10.3	NA
Africa	Lake Balangida	Tanzania	NA	NA
Africa	Lake Eyasi	Tanzania	9.3	0.5%
Africa	Lake Manyara	Tanzania	9.5–10	NA
Africa	Momela Lakes	Tanzania	9.7	22%
Africa	Lake Natron	Tanzania	9–10.5	>10%
Africa	Lake Rukwa	Tanzania	8–9	NA
Asia	Guozha lake	China	NA	NA
Asia	Qinghai Lake	China	9.3	2.2%
Asia	Lake Zabuye (Drangyer)	China	10	NA
Asia	Kartsakhi Lake	Georgia/Turkey	NA	0.09%
Asia	Khyagar Lake	India	9.5	0.6%
Asia	Kushul lake	India	NA	NA
Asia	Lonar Lake (Crater Lake)	India	9.5–10.5	1%
Asia	Namucuo Lake	India	9.4	0.2%
Asia	Sambhar Salt Lake	India	9.5	7%
Asia	Tso Kar Salt Lake	India	8.8	NA
Asia	Tso Moriri Salt Lake	India	9.0	NA
Asia	Aksayqin Hu Lake	Aksai Chin, India/China	NA	NA
Asia	Lake Hongshan Hu	Aksai Chin, India/China	NA	NA
Asia	Pangong Lake	India & China	9.4	0.9%
Asia	Spanggur Tso (Pongur Tso)	India & China	NA	NA
Asia	Surigh Yilganing Kol	Aksai Chin, India/China	NA	NA
Asia	Tianshuihai lake	Aksai Chin, India/China	NA	NA
Asia	North Tianshuihai lake	Aksai Chin, India/China	NA	NA
Asia	Tso Tang Lake	Aksai Chin, India/China	NA	NA
Asia	Satonda Island	Indonesia	8.55	
Asia	Kulunda Steppe lakes (Borli)	Kazakhstan	8.89-9.16	5.7%
Asia	Kulunda St. (Petukhovo)	Russia	9.8-10.1	
Asia	Kulunda St. (Petukhovo)	Russia	9.1-9.5	
Asia	Kulunda St. (Uyaly)	Kazakhstan	9.47-9.50	2.7%
Asia	Taboos-nor	Mongolia	NA	NA
Asia	Lake Khatyn	Russia	10	NA
Asia	Torey Lakes	Russia, Mongolia	NA	NA
Asia	Lake Salda	Turkey	NA	NA
Asia	Lake Van	Turkey	9.7–9.8	2.3%
Europe	Lake Neusiedl (Fertő)	Austria, Hungary	9–9.3	NA
Europe	Böddi-szék	Hungary	8.8–9.8	12.34%
Europe	Lake Fehér (Szeged)	Hungary	NA	NA
Europe	Kelemen-szék	Hungary	9–9.7	NA
Europe	Nagy-Vadas	Hungary	NA	NA
Europe	Specchio di Venere (Pantelleria Island)	Italy		
Europe	Velika Rusanda	Serbia	9.3	NA
Europe	Malham Tarn	UK	8.0–8.6	NA
North America	Manitou Lake, Saskatchewan	Canada	NA	NA
North America	Deer Lake (Cariboo Plateau, British Columbia)	Canada		
North America	Goodenough Lake (Bonaparte Plateau, British Columbia)	Canada	10.2	NA
North America	Last Chance Lake (Bonaparte Plateau, British Columbia)	Canada		
North America	Probe Lake (Cariboo Plateau, British Columbia)	Canada		
North America	Lake Texcoco	Mexico	8.8–11.5	8%
North America	Lake Alchichica	Mexico	8.9	NA
North America	Alkali Lake, Oregon	US	11	NA
North America	Baldwin Lake, California	US	NA	NA
North America	Borax Lake, Oregon	US	NA	NA
North America	Kauhako Crater Lake, Molokai, Hawaii	US		
North America	Mono Lake, California	US	9.8	8%
North America	Owens Lake, California	US	NA	NA
North America	Soap Lake, Washington	US	9.7	0.7%
North America	Soda Lakes, Nevada	US	9.7	NA
North America	Summer Lake, Oregon	US	NA	NA
South America	Antofagasta Lake	Chile	NA	NA
Oceania	Niuafoʻou Caldera Lake	Tonga		
Oceania	Lake Werowrap	Australia	9.8	4%

== Industrial use ==
Many water-soluble chemicals are extracted from the soda lake waters worldwide. Lithium carbonate (see Lake Zabuye), potash (see lake Lop Nur and Qinghai Salt Lake Potash), soda ash (see Lake Abijatta and Lake Natron), etc. are extracted in large quantities. Lithium carbonate is a raw material in production of lithium which has applications in lithium storage batteries widely used in modern electronic gadgets and electrically powered automobiles. Water of some soda lakes are rich in dissolved uranium carbonate. Algaculture is carried out on a commercial scale with soda lake water.

== See also ==
- Alkali soils
- Dry lake
- Residual sodium carbonate index
- List of bodies of water by salinity
