= Maraldy (lake) =

Lake in Kazakhstan

- Маралды
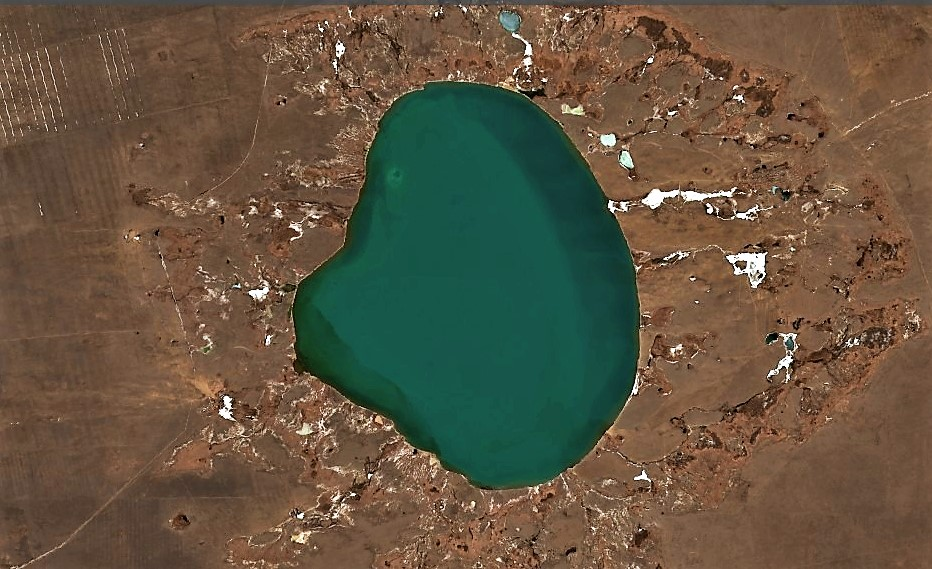
- Sentinel-2 picture of the lake

- Location within Kazakhstan
- Location: Kulunda Plain
- Coordinates: 52°18′54″N 77°46′23″E
- Type: Salt lake
- Catchment area: 773 square kilometers (298 sq mi)
- Basin countries: Kazakhstan
- Max. length: 9.5 kilometers (5.9 mi)
- Max. width: 8.3 kilometers (5.2 mi)
- Surface area: 54.7 square kilometers (21.1 sq mi)
- Average depth: 3.3 meters (11 ft)
- Surface elevation: 62 meters (203 ft)
- Islands: none
- Settlements: Pavlodar

Maraldy or Maraldi (Kazakh: Маралды) is a salt lake in Sharbakty and Pavlodar districts, Pavlodar Region, Kazakhstan.

The lake lies 45 kilometers (28 mi) to the east of Pavlodar town, about 50 kilometers (31 mi) west of the Russia-Kazakhstan border. The A18 highway passes to the north of the lake.

== Geography ==
Maraldy is part of the Irtysh basin. It lies in a tectonic depression of the Kulunda Plain, 75 kilometers (47 mi) to the southwest of lake Bolshoye Yarovoye, located on the other side of the border. Lake Ulken Tobylzhan lies 42 kilometers (26 mi) to the NNW, Seiten 40 kilometers (25 mi) to the SSE, Kalatuz 46 kilometers (29 mi) to the SSW, and Bura 57 kilometers (35 mi) to the northeast, at the Russia-Kazakhstan border.

The lakeshore is generally flat and gently sloping, only in the southeast there are cliffs rising steeply from the surface. The water of the lake is saline with a mineralization of 2.6 grams per liter (9.4×10^{−5} lb/cu in). The mud of the lake is used locally for medicinal purposes.

== Flora and fauna ==
The lake is surrounded by steppe vegetation. Despite its high salinity, Maraldy is not a dead lake. There are small Artemia crustaceans living in its waters.

== See also ==
- List of lakes of Kazakhstan
