= Malybay (Pavlodar Region) =

Village in Akkuly District, Kazakhstan

Malybay Малыбай
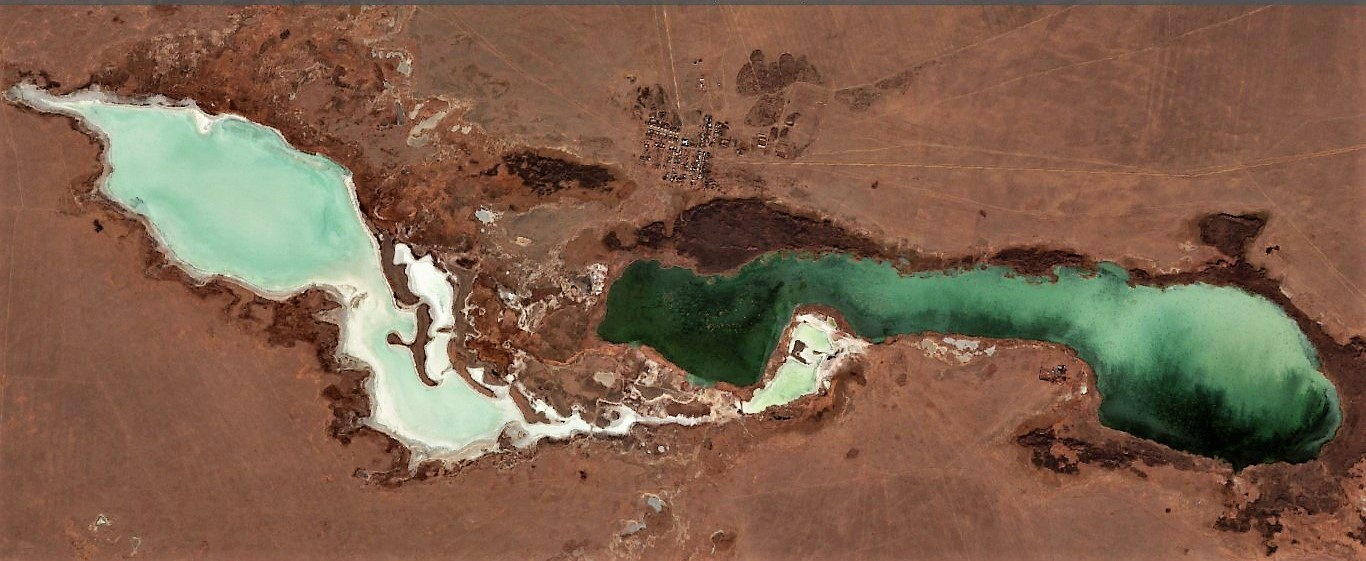
- Malybay in the upper part at the center

- Location in Kazakhstan
- Coordinates: 51°38′33″N 78°20′29″E
- Country: Kazakhstan
- Region: Pavlodar Region
- District: Akkuly District
- Rural District: Malybay Rural District

Population (2009)
  - Total: 541
- Time zone: UTC+6
- Postcode: 140705

Malybay (Kazakh: Малыбай) is a settlement in Akkuly District, Pavlodar Region, Kazakhstan. It is the administrative center of Malybay Rural District. Population: 541 (2009 census results); 688 (1999 census results).

== Geography ==
Malybay lies close to the north of Malybay lake and 3 kilometers (1.9 mi) to the northeast of lake Zhaltyr. Akkuly town, the district capital lies 41 kilometers (25 mi) to the southwest, Kazy village 25 kilometers (16 mi) to the northwest, and Maykaragay 28 kilometers (17 mi) to the ENE.
