= Malybay, Almaty Region =

Village in Kazakhstan

Malybay
- Village
- Location in Kazakhstan
- Coordinates: 43°29′38″N 78°24′27″E
- Country: Kazakhstan
- Region: Almaty Region
- District: Enbekshikazakh District
- Time zone: UTC+6 (Omsk Time)

Malybay is a village in Almaty Region, in south-eastern Kazakhstan.
