= Beskaragay =

Beskaragay Бесқарағай
- Nickname: Boras
- Location in Kazakhstan
- Coordinates: 50°53′09″N 79°28′58″E
- Country: Kazakhstan
- Region: Abai Region
- District: Beskaragay District
- Rural District: Beskaragay Rural District

Population (2019)
  - Total: 4,267
- Time zone: UTC+6
- Postcode: 070300

Beskaragay (Kazakh: Бесқарағай; Russian: Бескарагай), known as Bolshaya Vladimirovka until 2007, is a settlement in Abai Region, Kazakhstan. It is the capital of Beskaragay District and the administrative center of the Beskaragay Rural District (KATO code — 633630100). Population: 4,377 (2009 census results); 4,861 (1999 census results).

== Geography ==
Beskaragay lies about 30 kilometers (19 mi) west of the Russia-Kazakhstan border, and 75 kilometers (47 mi) to the northwest of Semey city (Semipalatinsk), the regional capital.
