= Beskaragay District =

Coordinates: 51.0112°N 79.154°E

- District
- Бесқарағай ауданы
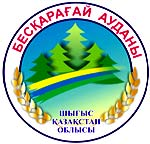
- Coat of arms

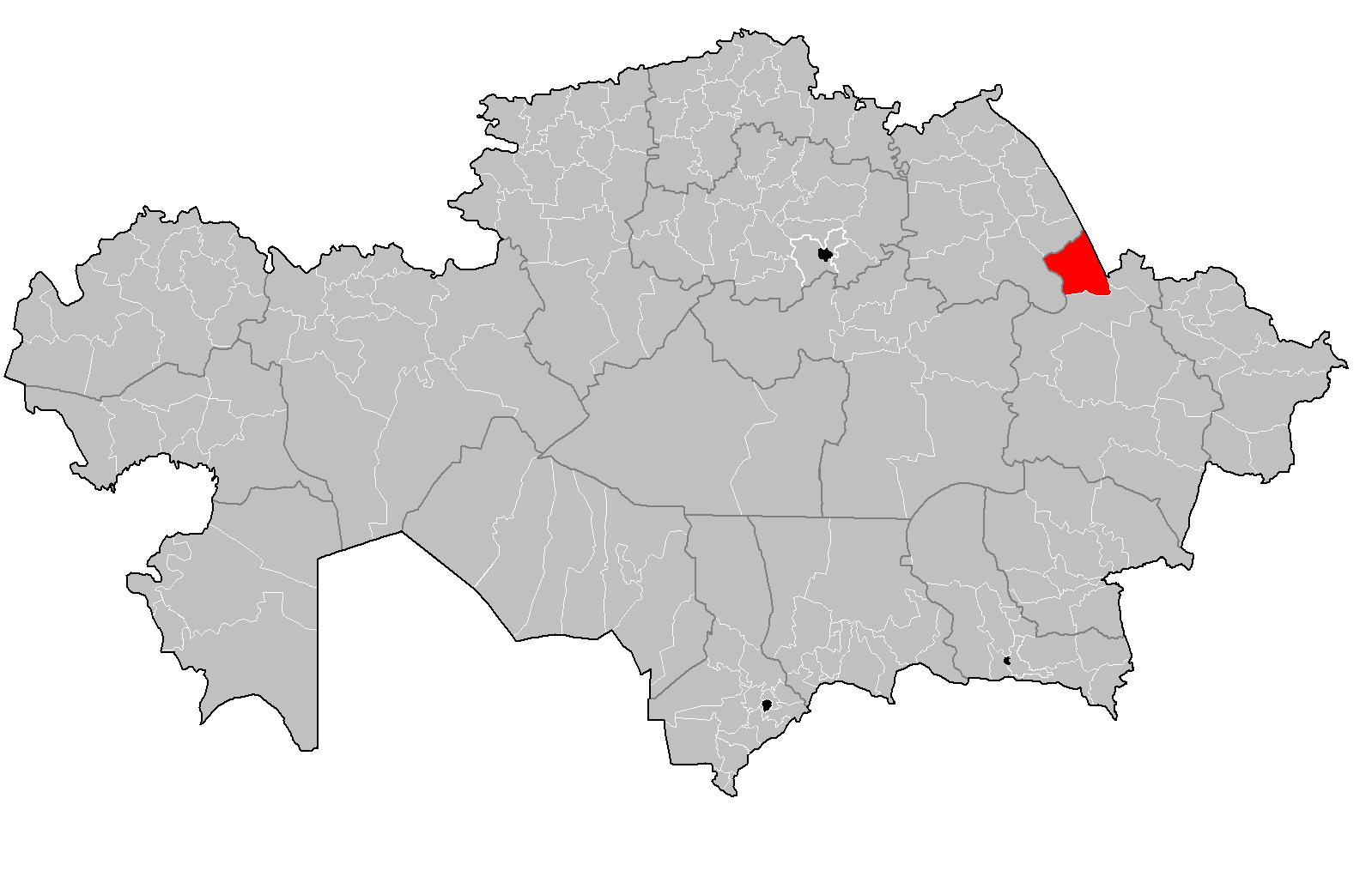
- Country: Kazakhstan
- Region: Abai Region
- Administrative center: Beskaragay
- Founded: 1926

Government
  - Akim: Talgat Muratov

Area
  - Total: 4,400 sq mi (11,400 km^{2})

Population (2013)
  - Total: 21,052
- Time zone: UTC+6 (East)

Beskaragay District (Kazakh: Бесқарағай ауданы; Besqarağai audany) is a district of Abai Region in eastern Kazakhstan. The administrative center of the district is the selo of Beskaragay. Population: 21,052 (2013 estimate); 22,210 (2009 census results); 28,140 (1999 census results).
