= Akkuly District =

Coordinates: 51°28′15″N 77°46′42″E

Akkuly
- District
- Аққулы ауданы
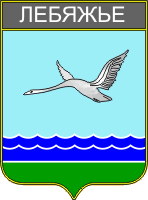
- Coat of arms

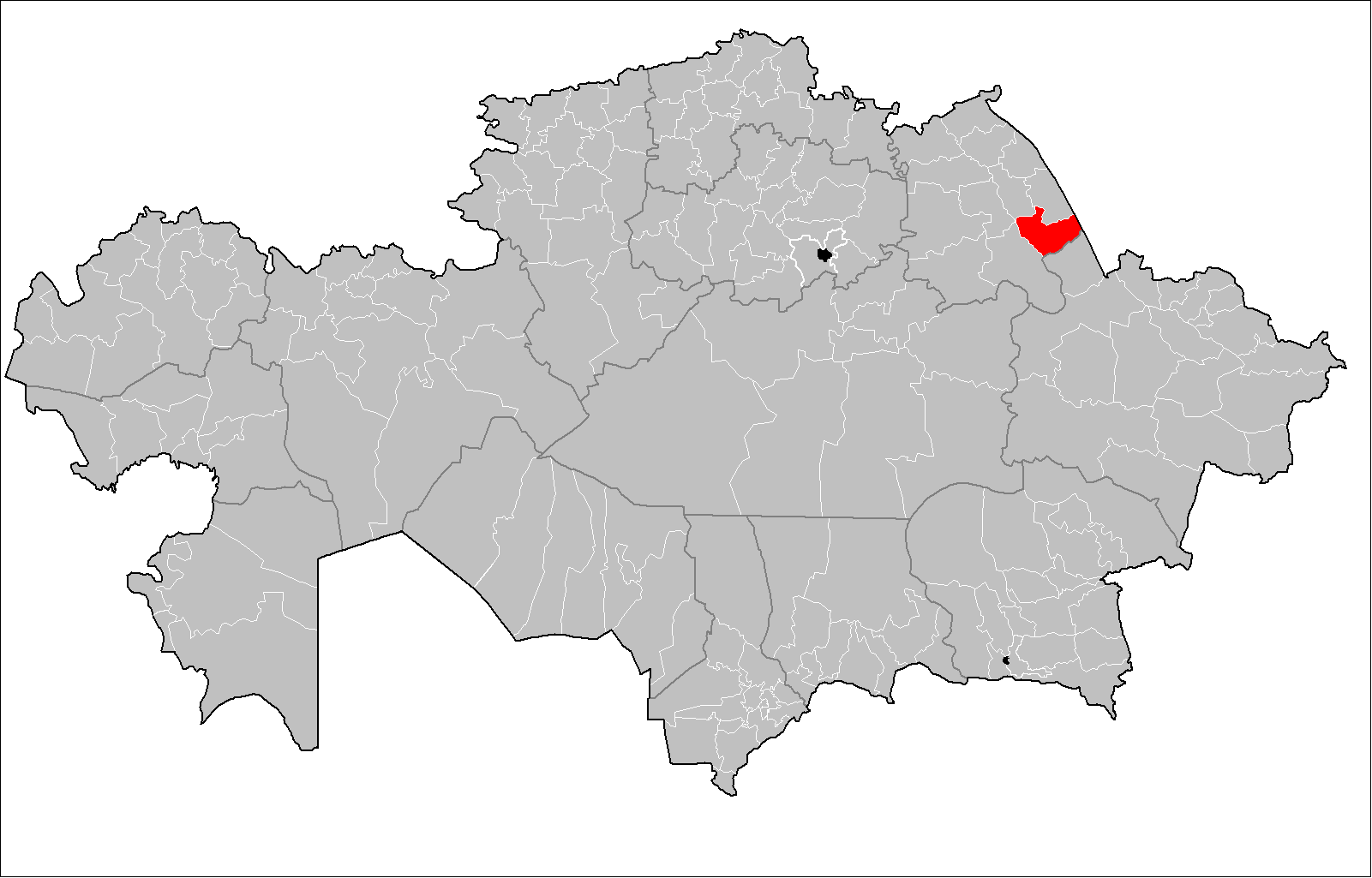
- Country: Kazakhstan
- Region: Pavlodar Region
- Administrative center: Akkuly
- Founded: 1939

Government
  - Akim: Balgabaev Abzal Abilkhakovich

Area
  - Total: 3,100 sq mi (8,100 km^{2})

Population (2017)
  - Total: 12,444
- Time zone: UTC+6 (East)
- Website: http://lebyazhye.pavlodar.gov.kz/

Akkuly (Kazakh: Аққулы ауданы, Aqquly audany, اققۋلى اۋدانى), until 2018 Lebyazhye (Kazakh: Лебяжі ауданы, Lebiaji audany) is a district of Pavlodar Region in northern Kazakhstan. The administrative center of the district is the selo of Akkuly (Kazakh: Аққулы, Aqquly; formerly Akku, Kazakh: Аққу, Aqqu (2018-1996); Lebyazhye (Russian: Лебяжье (until 1996)). Population: 12444 (on January 1, 2018 estimate); 13,798 (2013 estimate); 14,593 (2009 census results); 19,653 (1999 census results).

On 4 August 2018 President of the Republic of Kazakhstan Nursultan Nazarbayev adopted decree to rename Lebyazhye District to Akkuly District.

== Geography ==
The Irtysh river flows across Akkuly District. Lakes Borli, Kyzyltuz, Sharbakty, Zhaltyr, Malybay, Kazy and Kalatuz are located in the district.
