= Kulunda Steppe =

Plain in Russia

Kulunda Steppe Kulunda Plain Кулундинская степь Құлынды даласы
- Plain
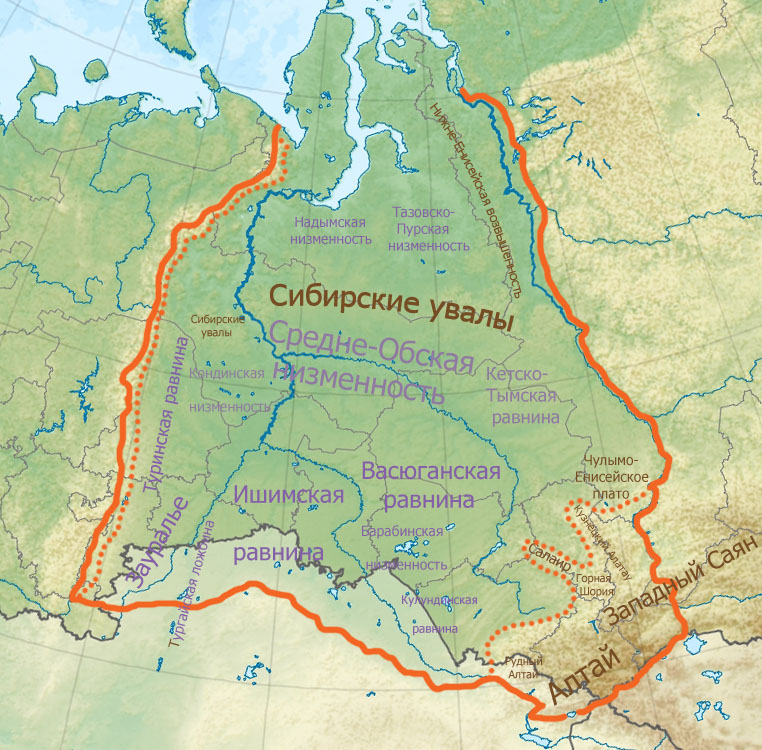
- Map of the West Siberian Plain with the Kulunda Plain in the southern part

- Location within Russia
- Coordinates: 52°50′N 79°30′E
- Location: Kazakhstan, Russia
- Part of: West Siberian Plain

Area
  - Total: 100,000 km^{2} (39,000 sq mi)
- Elevation: 70 meters (230 ft) to 250 meters (820 ft)

The Kulunda Steppe or Kulunda Plain (Russian: Кулундинская равнина, Kazakh: Құлынды даласы, Qūlyndy dalasy) is an alluvial plain in Russia and Kazakhstan. It is an important agricultural region in Western Siberia.

== Geography ==
The steppe is located between the Ob and Irtysh rivers in the southern part of the West Siberian Plain, to the west of the Ob Plateau. Steppe landscapes predominate, especially in the north and east of the plain, which extends across the Altai Krai of Russia and the Pavlodar Oblast of Kazakhstan, with a small northern section in the Novosibirsk Oblast, as well as small southern part in the East Kazakhstan Oblast.

The Baraba Steppe lies to the northwest. The border between both plains is not well defined. Conventionally, it is carried out at 54 degrees north latitude.

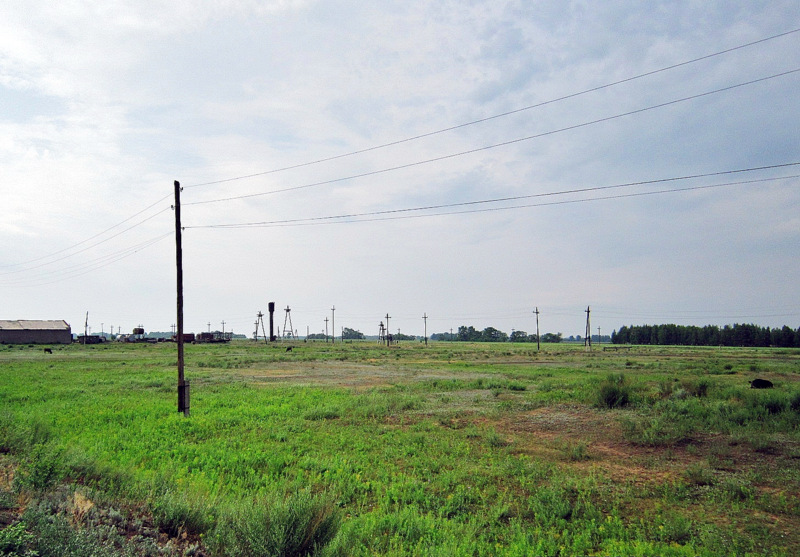
Kulunda Steppe in Nemetsky National District.

=== Hydrology ===
The main rivers are the Kuchuk, Kulunda and Burla.

There are large lakes in the central part of the Kulunda plain, such as Lake Kuchuk, Kulunda, Bolshoye Topolnoye, Ulken Azhbolat, Ulken Tobylzhan, Maraldy and Bolshoye Yarovoye. Most of them are salty or briny, but some are soda lakes, such as lakes Borli (Akkuly District, Pavlodar Region), Uyaly, Bitter (several lakes, Mikhaylovsky district), lake Krivoe or Crooked Lake (Uglovsky district), Khilganta, (Note: Lake Khilganta is a small chloride-sulfate lake; its salinity dropped from 160–250 g/L in 2011–2012 to 60 g/L in 2015 and 13 g/L in 2018.) the Tanatars soda lakes group, (Note: The Tanatars soda lakes is south of the Malinovoe Ozero village, in Mikhailovsky district. The salinity in lake Tanatar-VI dropped from 160 g/L in 2011 to 34 g/L in 2022, and its alkalinity from 1.7 to 0.35 mol-eq/L in the same period, while its pH for the same period dropped only from 10 to 9.8; but salinisation rose again from 2021 on, as floodings receded.) Gorchina 1, Gorchina 3, Petukhovo (near Severka), Petukhovo (near Petukhi), lake Zhivopisnoe or Picturesque Lake (Mikhaylovsky district) and many others.

Lakes of the Kulunda steppe

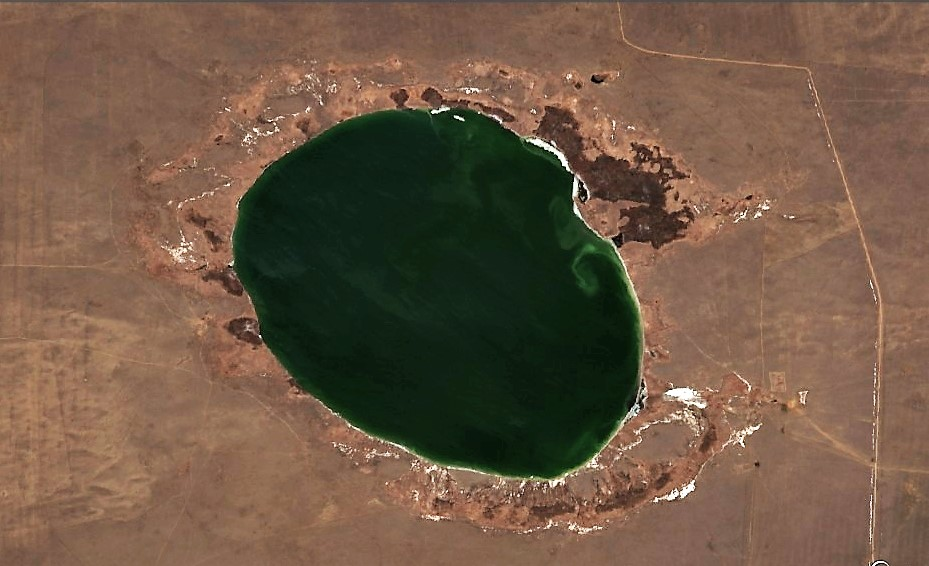
Soda lake Borli (Akkuly District)

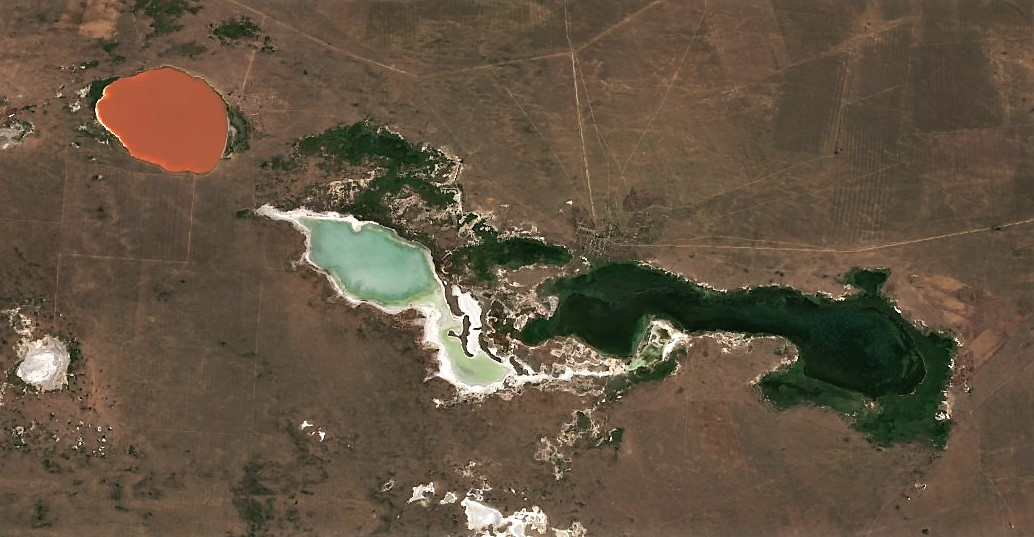
Red lake Kyzyltuz (Akkuly District) in the upper left
