= Akkuly =

Akkuly Аққулы
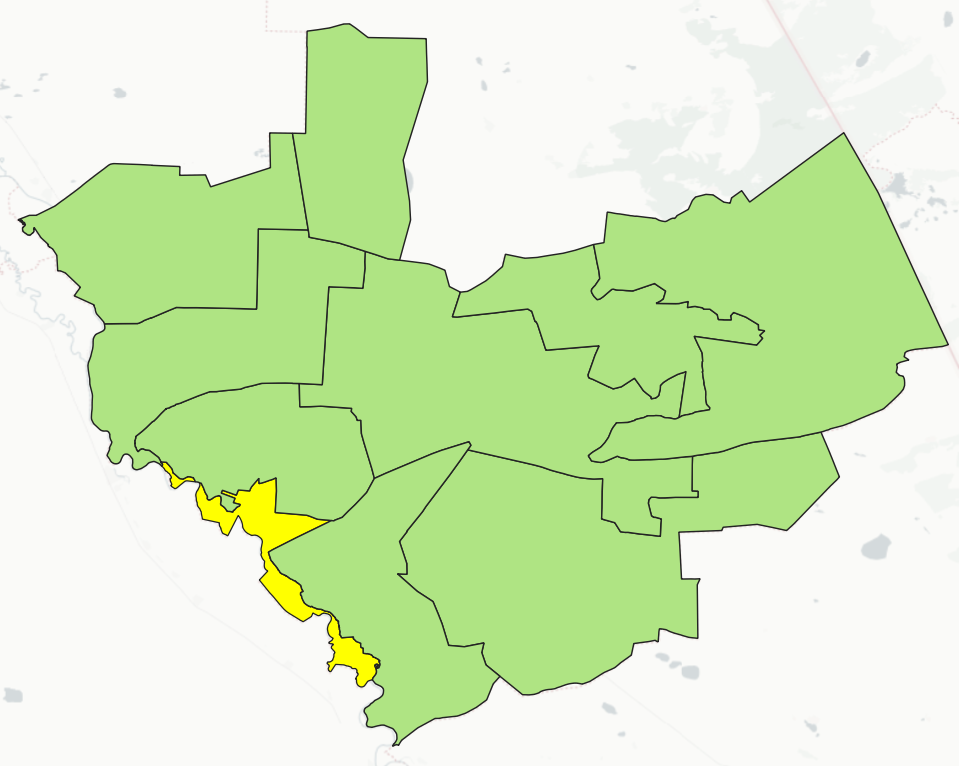
- Akkuly Rural District

- Location in Kazakhstan
- Coordinates: 51°28′11″N 77°46′50″E
- Country: Kazakhstan
- Region: Pavlodar Region
- District: Akkuly District
- Rural District: Akkuly Rural District
- Established: 1744

Population (2009)
  - Total: 2,940
- Time zone: UTC+6
- Postcode: 140700

Akkuly (Kazakh: Аққулы; Russian: Аккулы), formerly known as Lebyazhye (Лебяжье) until 1999 and then renamed Akku (Аққу) until 2018, is a settlement in Pavlodar Region, Kazakhstan. It is the capital of Akkuly District and the administrative center of the Akkuly Rural District (KATO code — 555230100). Population: 2,940 (2009 census results); 3,645 (1999 census results).

== Geography ==
Akkuly lies by the right bank of the Irtysh river, 122 kilometers (76 mi) to the SSE of Pavlodar city, the regional capital.
