= Karpilovka, Altai Krai =

Karpilovka Карпиловка
- Selo
- Location within Altai Krai Location within Russia
- Coordinates: 52°54′N 78°58′E
- Country: Russia
- Region: Altai Krai
- District: Tabunsky District
- Time zone: UTC+7:00

Karpilovka (Russian: Карпиловка) is a rural locality (a selo) in Bolsheromanovsky Selsoviet, Tabunsky District, Altai Krai, Russia. The population was 26 as of 2013. There are 2 streets.

== Geography ==
Karpilovka lies in the Kulunda Steppe, 14 kilometers (8.7 mi) to the southwest of lake Maloye Yarovoye and 6 kilometers (3.7 mi) to the south of lake Belenkoye. It is located 28 km northeast of Tabuny (the district's administrative centre) by road. Kanna is the nearest rural locality.
