= Slavgorodsky =

Slavgorodsky (Russian: Славгородский; masculine), Slavgorodskaya (Славгородская; feminine), or Slavgorodskoye (Славгородское; neuter) is the name of several rural localities in Russia:

- Slavgorodskoye, Altai Krai, a selo under the administrative jurisdiction of the town of krai significance of Slavgorod, Altai Krai
- Slavgorodskoye, Belgorod Oblast, a selo in Alexeyevsky District of Belgorod Oblast

== See also ==
- Slavgorod
