= Georgiyevka, Tabunsky District, Altai Krai =

Georgiyevka Георгиевка
- Selo
- Location within Altai Krai Location within Russia
- Coordinates: 53°00′N 79°03′E
- Country: Russia
- Region: Altai Krai
- District: Tabunsky District
- Time zone: UTC+7:00

Georgiyevka (Russian: Георгиевка) is a rural locality (a selo) in Serebropolsky Selsoviet, Tabunsky District, Altai Krai, Russia. The population was 1 as of 2013. There is 1 street.

== Geography ==
Georgiyevka lies in the Kulunda Steppe, 3 kilometers (1.9 mi) to the west of lake Maloye Yarovoye and 6 kilometers (3.7 mi) to the ENE of lake Belenkoye. It is located 47 km northeast of Tabuny (the district's administrative centre) by road. Nikolayevka is the nearest rural locality.
