= Boslavino =

Boslavino Бославино
- Selo
- Location within Altai Krai Location within Russia
- Coordinates: 52°50′N 79°11′E
- Country: Russia
- Region: Altai Krai
- District: Tabunsky District
- Time zone: UTC+7:00

Boslavino (Russian: Бославино) is a single-street rural locality (a selo) in Lebedinsky Selsoviet, Tabunsky District, Altai Krai, Russia. The population was 4 as of 2013.

== Geography ==
Boslavino is located 34 km (21 mi) northeast of Tabuny (the district's administrative centre) by road. Serebropol is the nearest rural locality.
