= Novokiyevka, Altai Krai =

Novokiyevka Новокиевка
- Selo
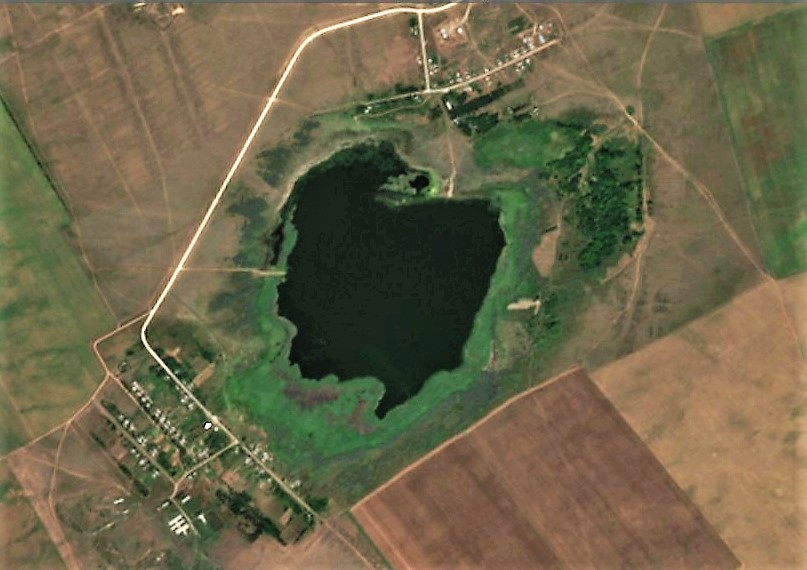
- Lake Bolshoye Tabuny Sentinel-2 image with Novokiyevka in the upper right.

- Location within Altai Krai Location within Russia
- Coordinates: 52°44′N 78°43′E
- Country: Russia
- Region: Altai Krai
- District: Tabunsky District
- Time zone: UTC+7:00

Novokiyevka (Russian: Новокиевка) is a rural locality (a selo) in Altaysky Selsoviet, Tabunsky District, Altai Krai, Russia. The population was 134 as of 2013. There are 3 streets.

== Geography ==
Novokiyevka lies in the Kulunda Steppe by lake Bolshoye Tabuny and 10 kilometers (6.2 mi) to the SSE of lake Bolshoye Yarovoye. It is located 9 km southwest of Tabuny (the district's administrative centre) by road. Aleksandrovka is the nearest rural locality.
