= Alexandrovka, Tabunsky District, Altai Krai =

Alexandrovka Александровка
- Selo
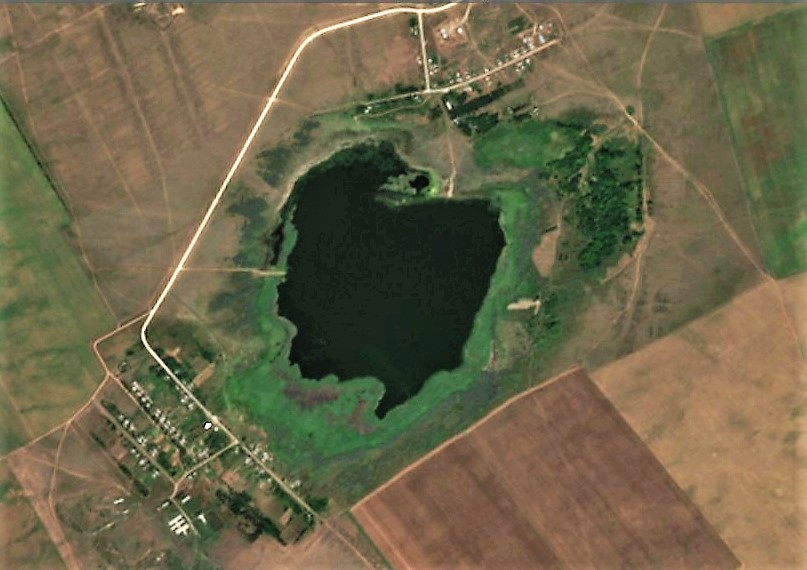
- Lake Bolshoye Tabuny Sentinel-2 image with Alexandrovka in the lower left

- Location within Altai Krai Location within Russia
- Coordinates: 52°42′N 78°41′E
- Country: Russia
- Region: Altai Krai
- District: Tabunsky District
- Time zone: UTC+7:00

Alexandrovka (Russian: Александровка) is a rural locality (a selo) in Altaysky Selsoviet, Tabunsky District, Altai Krai, Russia. The population was 214 as of 2013. There are 4 streets.

== Geography ==
Alexandrovka lies in the Kulunda Steppe by lake Bolshoye Tabuny and 12 kilometers (7.5 mi) to the SSE of lake Bolshoye Yarovoye. It is located 12 km southwest of Tabuny (the district's administrative centre) by road. Novokiyevka is the nearest rural locality.
