= Semyonovka, Slavgorod, Altai Krai =

Semyonovka Семёновка
- Selo
- Location within Altai Krai Location within Russia
- Coordinates: 53°05′N 78°58′E
- Country: Russia
- Region: Altai Krai
- District: Slavgorod
- Time zone: UTC+7:00

Semyonovka (Russian: Семёновка) is a rural locality (a selo) in Slavgorod, Altai Krai, Russia. The population was 705 as of 2013. There are 6 streets.

== Geography ==
Semyonovka lies in the Kulunda Steppe, 7 kilometers (4.3 mi) to the northwest of lake Maloye Yarovoye and 10 kilometers (6.2 mi) to the north of lake Belenkoye.
