= Bolsheromanovka =

Bolsheromanovka Большеромановка
- Selo
- Location within Altai Krai Location within Russia
- Coordinates: 52°59′N 78°51′E
- Country: Russia
- Region: Altai Krai
- District: Tabunsky District
- Time zone: UTC+7:00

Bolsheromanovka (Russian: Большеромановка) is a rural locality (a selo) and the administrative center of Bolsheromanovsky Selsoviet, Tabunsky District, Altai Krai, Russia. The population was 699 as of 2013. There are 8 streets.

== Geography ==
Bolsheromanovka lies in the Kulunda Steppe 4 kilometers (2.5 mi) to the west of lake Belenkoye. It is located 51 km north of Tabuny (the district's administrative centre) by road. Vesyoloye is the nearest rural locality.
