= Zabavnoye =

Zabavnoye Забавное
- Selo
- Location within Altai Krai Location within Russia
- Coordinates: 52°49′N 78°47′E
- Country: Russia
- Region: Altai Krai
- District: Tabunsky District
- Time zone: UTC+7:00

Zabavnoye (Russian: Забавное) is a rural locality (a selo) in Tabunsky Selsoviet, Tabunsky District, Altai Krai, Russia. The population was 233 as of 2013. There are 3 streets.

== Geography ==
Zabavnoye is located 8 km north of Tabuny (the district's administrative centre) by road. Udalnoye and Altayskoye are the nearest rural localities.
