= Novovoznesenka, Slavgorod, Altai Krai =

Novovoznesenka Нововознесенка
- Village
- Location within Altai Krai Location within Russia
- Coordinates: 53°08′N 79°10′E
- Country: Russia
- Region: Altai Krai
- Municipality: Slavgorod
- Time zone: UTC+7:00

Novovoznesenka (Russian: Нововознесенка) is a rural locality (a selo) in Slavgorod Municipality, Altai Krai, Russia. The population was 932 as of 2013. There are 10 streets.

== Geography ==
Novovoznesenka lies in the Kulunda Steppe, 10 kilometers (6.2 mi) to the northwest of lake Belenkoye and 10 kilometers (6.2 mi) to the northwest of lake Maloye Yarovoye. It is located 35 kilometers (22 mi) to the ENE of Slavgorod town, the centre of the municipality. Danilovka is the nearest rural locality.
