= Kanna, Altai Krai =

Kanna Канна
- Selo
- Location within Altai Krai Location within Russia
- Coordinates: 52°53′N 78°52′E
- Country: Russia
- Region: Altai Krai
- District: Tabunsky District
- Time zone: UTC+7:00

Kanna (Russian: Канна) is a rural locality (a selo) in Bolsheromanovsky Selsoviet, Tabunsky District, Altai Krai, Russia. The population was 57 as of 2013. There are 2 streets.

== Geography ==
Kanna is located 22 km northeast of Tabuny (the district's administrative centre) by road. Karpilovka is the nearest rural locality.
