= Serebropol =

Serebropol Сереброполь
- Selo
- Location within Altai Krai Location within Russia
- Coordinates: 52°53′N 79°12′E
- Country: Russia
- Region: Altai Krai
- District: Tabunsky District
- Time zone: UTC+7:00

Serebropol (Russian: Сереброполь) is a rural locality (a selo) and the administrative center of Serebropolsky Selsoviet, Tabunsky District, Altai Krai, Russia. The population was 998 as of 2013. There are 5 streets.

== Geography ==
Serebropol lies in the Kulunda Steppe 13 kilometers (8.1 mi) to the west of Lake Kulunda, 14 kilometers (8.7 mi) to the south of Maloye Yarovoye and 15 kilometers (9.3 mi) to the northwest of lake Zhigilda. It is located 31 km northeast of Tabuny (the district's administrative centre) by road. Saratovka is the nearest rural locality.
