= Kishi Tobylzhan =

Lake in Kazakhstan

- Кіші Тобылжан
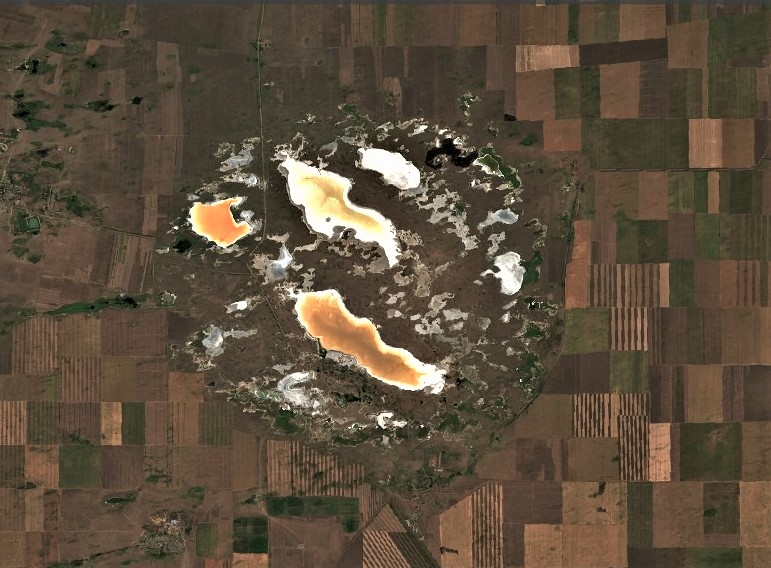
- Sentinel-2 image of the lake cluster

- Location within Kazakhstan
- Location: West Siberian Plain
- Coordinates: 52°46′42″N 77°37′32″E
- Type: endorheic
- Basin countries: Kazakhstan
- Max. length: 7.2 kilometers (4.5 mi)
- Max. width: 2.8 kilometers (1.7 mi)
- Surface area: 10.9 square kilometers (4.2 sq mi)
- Residence time: UTC+6
- Shore length^{1}: 18 kilometers (11 mi)
- Surface elevation: 92 meters (302 ft)
- ^{1} Shore length is not a well-defined measure.

Kishi Tobylzhan (Kazakh: Кіші Тобылжан, "Little Tobylzhan"; Russian: Малый Таволжан, Maly Tavolzhan) is a salt lake in Uspen District, Pavlodar Region, Kazakhstan.

The lake lies 44 kilometers (27 mi) west of the Kazakhstan–Russia border, 51 kilometers (32 mi) to the northeast of Pavlodar town and 10 kilometers (6.2 mi) south of Uspenka, the district capital. There is commercial extraction of salt from Maly Tobylzhan and its larger neighbor Ulken Tobylzhan. Some of the salt is exported to Western Siberia.

== Geography ==
Lake Kishi Tobylzhan is an elongated lake located in the Kulunda Steppe, southern end of the West Siberian Plain. It extends from northeast to southwest for over 7 kilometers (4.3 mi).

The lake is part of a circular lake cluster that is flat and has a diameter of roughly 18 kilometers (11 mi). Located in the northern half, Kishi Tobylzhan is the second largest of the lakes in the cluster. The A17 Highway passes by the lake to the west. Ulken Tobylzhan, the largest lake of the cluster lies 2.3 kilometers (1.4 mi) to the south of its southern end, and pink lake Katyrbay 2 kilometers (1.2 mi) to the west, on the other side of the A17 Highway. There are also a number of smaller lakes, as well as salt marshes in the Tobylzhan group. The lake group is surrounded by cultivated fields.

Lake Maraldy lies 47 kilometers (29 mi) to the south, and Ulken Azhbolat 46 kilometers (29 mi) to the north of Kishi Tobylzhan.

== See also ==
- List of lakes of Kazakhstan
