= Novorossiyka, Altai Krai =

Novorossiyka Новороссийка
- Village
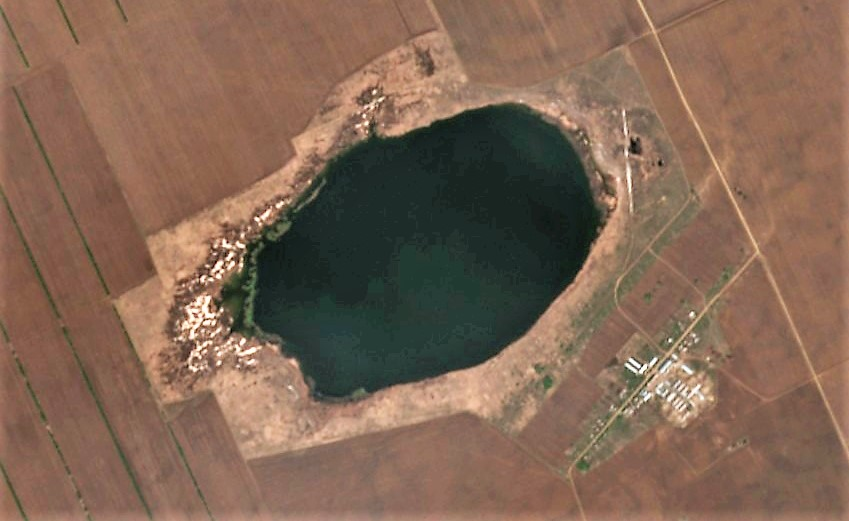
- Dzhemansor and Novorossiyka Sentinel-2 image

- Location within Altai Krai Location within Russia
- Coordinates: 52°47′N 79°09′E
- Country: Russia
- Region: Altai Krai
- District: Tabunsky District
- Rural District: Lebedinsky Rural District
- Time zone: UTC+7:00

Novorossiyka (Russian: Новороссийка) is a rural locality (a selo) in Lebedinsky Rural District, Tabunsky District, Altai Krai, Russia. The population was 39 as of 2013. There are 2 streets.

== Geography ==
Novorossiyka lies in the Kulunda Steppe by lake Dzhemansor and 16 kilometers (9.9 mi) to the NNE of lake Bolshoye Shklo. It is located 34 kilometers (21 mi) east of Tabuny (the district's administrative centre) by road. Vozdvizhenka and Yermakovka are the nearest rural localities.
