= Kamyshenka, Tabunsky District, Altai Krai =

Kamyshenka Камышенка
- Selo
- Location within Altai Krai Location within Russia
- Coordinates: 52°45′N 78°26′E
- Country: Russia
- Region: Altai Krai
- District: Tabunsky District
- Time zone: UTC+7:00

Kamyshenka (Russian: Камышенка) is a rural locality (a selo) in Altaysky Selsoviet, Tabunsky District, Altai Krai, Russia. The population was 240 as of 2013. There are 4 streets.

== Geography ==
Kamyshenka is located 30 km west of Tabuny (the district's administrative centre) by road. Granichnoye is the nearest rural locality.
