= Yambor =

Yambor Ямбор
- Selo
- Location within Altai Krai Location within Russia
- Coordinates: 52°44′N 78°51′E
- Country: Russia
- Region: Altai Krai
- District: Tabunsky District
- Time zone: UTC+7:00

Yambor (Russian: Ямбор) is a rural locality (a selo) in Tabunsky Selsoviet, Tabunsky District, Altai Krai, Russia. The population was 2 as of 2013. There is 1 street.

== Geography ==
Yambor is located 12 km southeast of Tabuny (the district's administrative centre) by road. Tabuny and Sambor are the nearest rural localities.
