= Bogatyr (Pavlodar Region) =

Bogatyr Богатырь
- Location in Kazakhstan
- Coordinates: 53°26′38″N 77°34′36″E
- Country: Kazakhstan
- Region: Pavlodar Region
- District: Uspensky District
- Rural District: Bogatyr Rural District
- Established: 1913

Population (2021)
  - Total: 260
- Time zone: UTC+5
- Postcode: 141002

Bogatyr (Kazakh: Богатырь) is a settlement in Uspen District, Pavlodar Region, Kazakhstan. It is the administrative center of the Bogatyr Rural District (KATO code — 556433100).

Population: 339 (2009 census results); 750 (1999 census results).

== Geography ==
Bogatyr is located on the southwestern shore of lake Shagan, very close to the Kazakhstan-Russia border. Now abandoned Pervomaysky village was 1.5 kilometers (0.93 mi) to the east by the lakeshore, on the other side of the border. Uspenka, the district capital, lies 76 kilometers (47 mi) to the southwest.
