= Udalnoye =

Udalnoye Удальное
- Selo
- Location within Altai Krai Location within Russia
- Coordinates: 52°49′N 78°51′E
- Country: Russia
- Region: Altai Krai
- District: Tabunsky District
- Time zone: UTC+7:00

Udalnoye (Russian: Удальное) is a rural locality (a selo) in Tabunsky Selsoviet, Tabunsky District, Altai Krai, Russia. The population was 215 as of 2013. There is 1 street.

== Geography ==
Udalnoye is located 9 km northeast of Tabuny (the district's administrative centre) by road. Zabavnoye is the nearest rural locality.
