= Vladimirovka, Altai Krai =

Vladimirovka Владимировка
- Selo
- Location within Altai Krai Location within Russia
- Coordinates: 53°05′N 79°04′E
- Country: Russia
- Region: Altai Krai
- District: Slavgorod
- Time zone: UTC+7:00

Vladimirovka (Russian: Владимировка) is a rural locality (a selo) in Slavgorod, Altai Krai, Russia. The population was 67 as of 2013. There are 2 streets.

== Geography ==
The village is located near lake Maloye Yarovoye.
