= Belenkoye (lake, Slavgorod Municipality) =

Salt lake in Altai Krai, Russia

- Беленькое
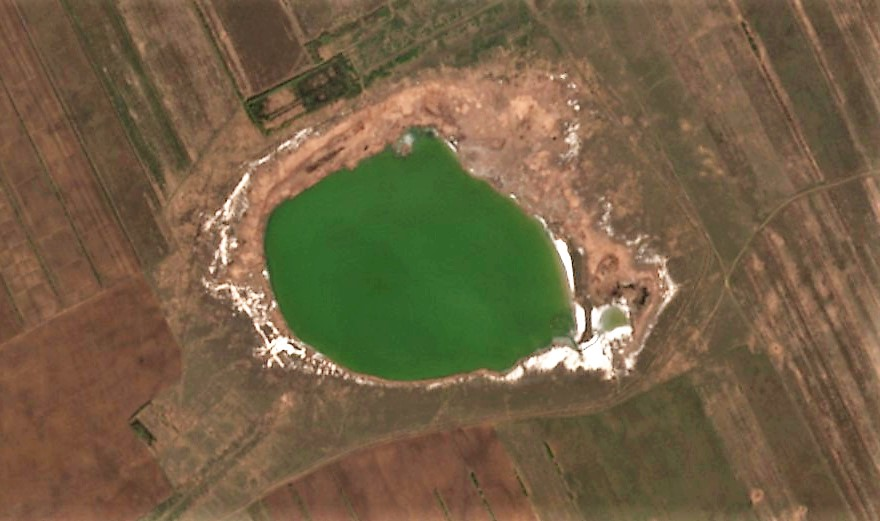
- Sentinel-2 image of lake Belenkoye. The ruined village of Paraskovyevka can be discerned on the lower left.

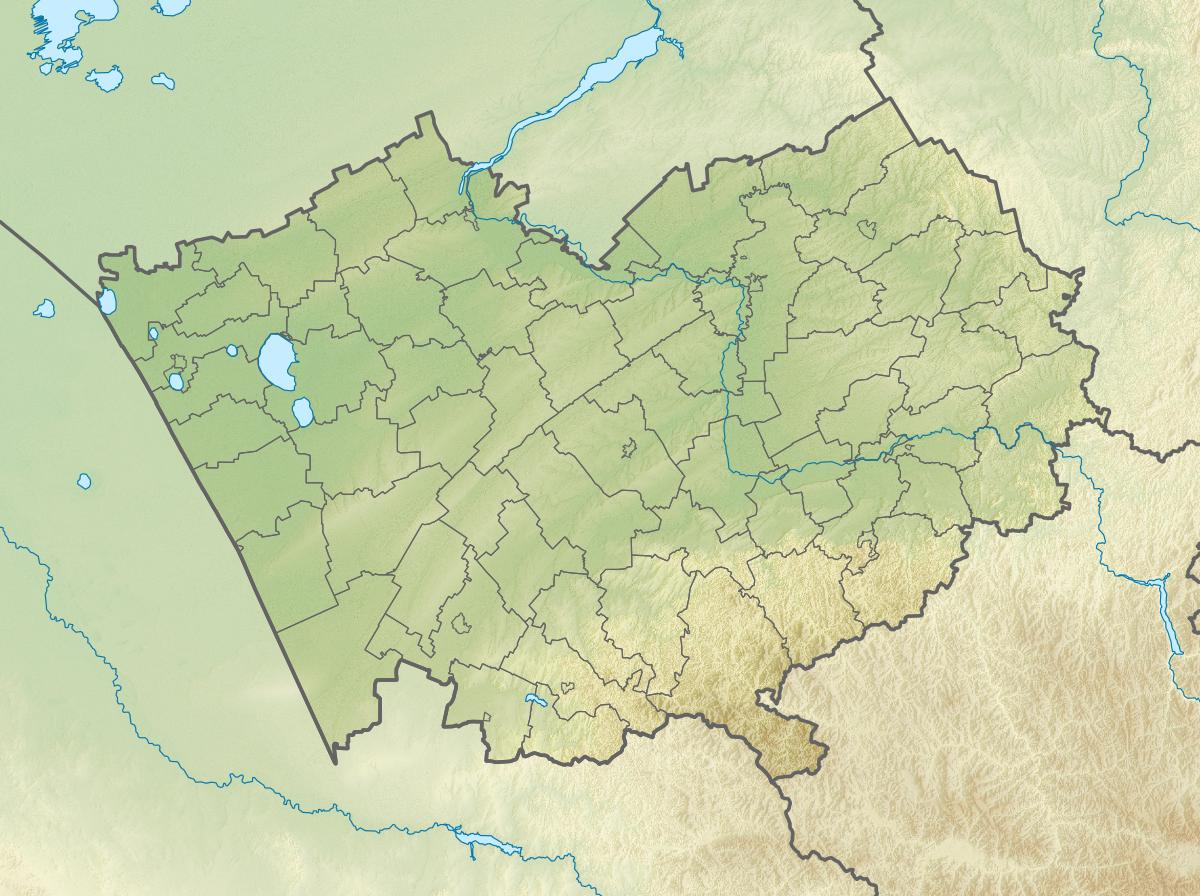
- Location within Altai Krai Location within Russia
- Location: Kulunda Steppe; West Siberian Plain
- Coordinates: 53°04′07″N 79°17′59″E
- Type: endorheic
- Catchment area: 477 square kilometers (184 sq mi)
- Basin countries: Russia
- Max. length: 1.8 kilometers (1.1 mi)
- Max. width: 1.4 kilometers (0.87 mi)
- Surface area: 2.2 square kilometers (0.85 sq mi)
- Water volume: 0.00179 cubic kilometers (0.00043 cu mi)
- Residence time: UTC+7
- Surface elevation: 100 meters (330 ft)

Belenkoye (Russian: Беленькое) is a salt lake in Slavgorod Municipality, Altai Krai, Russian Federation.

The lake lies at the western end of the Krai. Danilovka is located 6 kilometers (3.7 mi) to the north and Novovoznesenka 10 kilometers (6.2 mi) to the northwest. Slavgorod, the head of the municipality, lies 42 kilometers (26 mi) to the WSW of the lake.

== History ==
Founded in 1910, Paraskovyevka (Russian: Парасковьевка) was a farming settlement located 0.5 kilometers (0.31 mi) to the southwest of the Belenkoye lakeshore. It is known that in 1928 the village had a population of 297 people (164 men and 133 women) and that most of them were of Ukrainian origin. However, official data regarding the subsequent abolition of the settlement and the fate of its inhabitants are lacking.

Nowadays the ruins of the houses of Paraskovyevka and other vestiges of former habitation, can still be seen, but the circumstances in which the village was abandoned remain a mystery.

== Geography ==
Belenkoye is located in a residual depression of the Kulunda Plain. It has an oval shape, roughly oriented from WNW to ESE, with a length of less than 2 kilometers (1.2 mi).

Lake Maloye Yarovoye lies 8 kilometers (5.0 mi) to the WSW and Belenkoye (Tabunsky District) 23 kilometers (14 mi) in the same direction. Lake Kulunda lies only 5 kilometers (3.1 mi) to the east.

== Flora and fauna ==
The lake is surrounded by flat steppe landscape, salt pans and cultivated fields. Artemia salina crustaceans live in the lake and are periodically harvested for commercial purposes.

== See also ==
- List of lakes of Russia
