= Zaza Napoli =

Russian pop singer (born 1973)

Vladim Vladimirovich Kazantsev
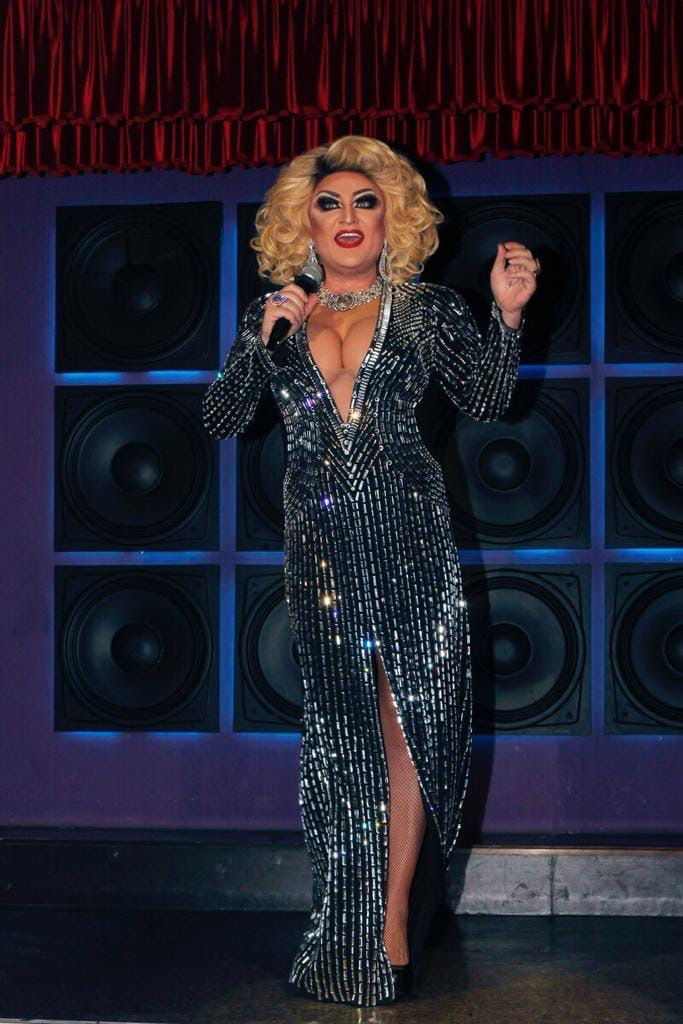

Background information
- Also known as: Zaza Napoli
- Born: Vladim Vladimirovich Kazantsev; April 14, 1973 (age 52); Yarovoye, Altai Krai, Russia
- Origin: Yarovoye, Altai Krai, Russia
- Genres: pop
- Occupations: singer, artist

Vladim Vladimirovich Kazantsev (Russian: Владим Владимирович Казанцев; born April 14, 1973, Yarovoye, Altai Krai, Russia), better known by the stage name Zaza Napoli (Russian: Заза Наполи), is a Russian pop singer and artist.

== Biography ==
Vladim Kazantsev was born on April 14, 1973, in Yarovoye, Altai Krai. In 1991, Vladim graduated from college and received a diploma as a teacher of primary school. Later he went to work at school. After working there for one year, he quit and entered the East Siberian State Institute of Culture in the department of theater art, specializing in theater and cinema.

In 1997 he moved to Moscow, and in 1998 founded the Travesti Theater "Paradise Birds". In 2002, he starred in the crime film "Ice Age". In 2006, Zaza Napoli took part in the series "Do not be born beautiful." Also starred in the thriller “Cursed Paradise”, the comedy “Kings of the Game”, etc. In 2007, he became a TV presenter of the program “Bitch-Love” on NTV.

In 2017, he released his debut album called "Для тебя...", which included 22 tracks. He recorded clips for the songs “Бабушки”, “Давайте выпьем” and “Подруга”. In the same year he released an album entitled "Это можно...", it included 12 tracks. In 2020, the album "Бархатный рай" was released.

He is the owner of such awards as: “Night Life Awards”, “Best Club Show” and “Silver Galosh”.

== Discography ==
Year	Name	Detailed
2017	«Для тебя...»	Released: 2017; Format: Music download, CD; Label: SuperMegaHit.com
2017	«Это можно...»	Released: 2017; Format: Music download, CD; Label: SuperMegaHit.com
2020	«Бархатный рай»	Released: 2020; Format: Music download, CD; Label: Perpetuum Music
