= Tobylzhan =

Tobylzhan Тобылжан
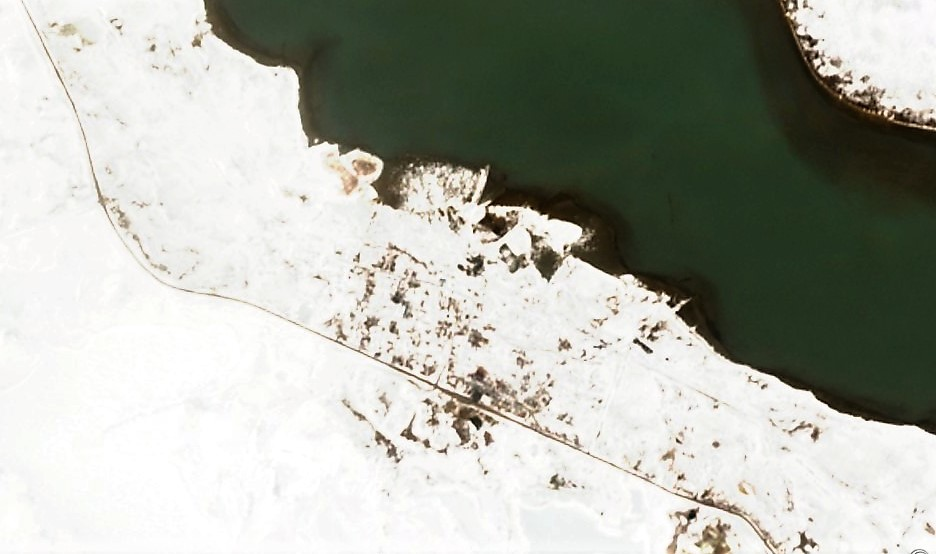
- Tobylzhan by lake Ulken Tobylzhan Sentinel-2 image

- Location in Kazakhstan
- Coordinates: 52°42′41″N 77°27′22″E
- Country: Kazakhstan
- Region: Pavlodar Region
- District: Uspen District
- Rural District: Ravnopol Rural District
- Established: 1909

Population (2009)
  - Total: 569
- Time zone: UTC+6
- Postcode: 141014

Tobylzhan (Kazakh: Тобылжан; Russian: Таволжан) is a settlement in Uspen District, Pavlodar Region, Kazakhstan. It is part of Ravnopol Rural District (KATO code — 556457100). Population: 569 (2009 census results); 715 (1999 census results). Salt mining has been carried out in the village since the 1930s.

== Geography ==
Tobylzhan lies by the southern shore of lake Ulken Tobylzhan, about 20 kilometers (12 mi) to the SSE of Uspenka, the district capital. The A17 Highway connecting Uspenka and the regional capital Pavlodar passes to the south of the village.
