= Danilovka, Slavgorod, Altai Krai =

Danilovka Даниловка
- Village
- Location within Altai Krai Location within Russia
- Coordinates: 53°07′N 79°16′E
- Country: Russia
- Region: Altai Krai
- Municipality: Slavgorod
- Time zone: UTC+7:00

Danilovka (Russian: Даниловка) is a rural locality (a selo) in Slavgorod Municipality, Altai Krai, Russia. The population was 79 as of 2013. There is 1 street.

== Geography ==
Danilovka lies in the Kulunda Steppe, 6 kilometers (3.7 mi) to the north of lake Belenkoye. It is located 43 kilometers (27 mi) to the ENE of Slavgorod town, the centre of the municipality. Novovoznesenka is the nearest rural locality.
