= Ulken Tobylzhan =

Salt lake in Uspen District, Pavlodar Region, Kazakhstan

- Үлкен Тобылжан
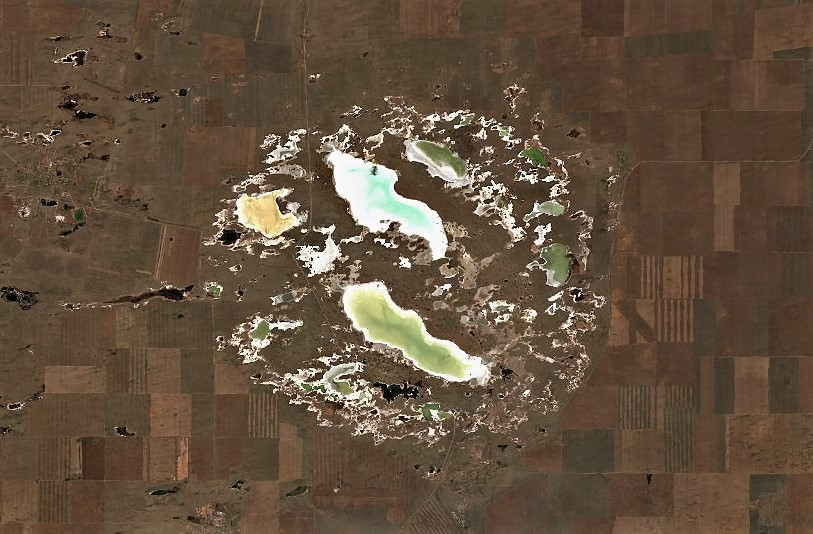
- Sentinel-2 image of the lake cluster

- Location within Kazakhstan
- Location: West Siberian Plain
- Coordinates: 52°43′31″N 77°28′39″E
- Type: endorheic
- Basin countries: Kazakhstan
- Max. length: 7.7 kilometers (4.8 mi)
- Max. width: 2.1 kilometers (1.3 mi)
- Surface area: 12.5 square kilometers (4.8 sq mi)
- Residence time: UTC+6
- Shore length^{1}: 17.4 kilometers (10.8 mi)
- Surface elevation: 92 meters (302 ft)
- ^{1} Shore length is not a well-defined measure.

Ulken Tobylzhan (Kazakh: Үлкен Тобылжан; Russian: Большой Таволжан, Bolshoy Tavolzhan) is a salt lake in Uspen District, Pavlodar Region, Kazakhstan.

The lake lies 48 kilometers (30 mi) to the northeast of Pavlodar town and 15 kilometers (9.3 mi) south of Uspenka, the district capital. There is commercial extraction of salt from Ulken Tobylzhan and Maly Tobylzhan, the two largest lakes of the group. Part of the salt is exported to the Western Siberia region.

== Geography ==
Lake Ulken Tobylzhan is an elongated lake, part of a circular lake cluster located in the Kulunda Steppe, southern end of the West Siberian Plain. It lies 45 kilometers (28 mi) west of the Kazakhstan–Russia border. The group of lakes is flat and has a diameter of roughly 18 kilometers (11 mi). It is surrounded by cultivated fields.

Located in the southern half, Ulken Tobylzhan is the largest of the lakes in the cluster. Tobylzhan village lies near the southern lakeshore. The A17 Highway skirts the lake from the south and turns northeast and north, crossing the lake zone. Ulken Tobylzhan is followed by only slightly smaller Kishi Tobylzhan (Maly Tavolzhan) located 2.3 kilometers (1.4 mi) to the north of its NW end. There are a number of smaller lakes, as well as salt marshes in the Tobylzhan cluster.

Lake Maraldy lies 40 kilometers (25 mi) to the south, Ulken Azhbolat 45 kilometers (28 mi) to the north, and Bolshoye Yarovoye 70 kilometers (43 mi) to the ENE of the lake cluster.

== See also ==
- List of lakes of Kazakhstan
