= Bursol =

Bursol Бурсоль
- Settlement
- Location within Altai Krai Location within Russia
- Coordinates: 53°09′N 78°26′E
- Country: Russia
- Region: Altai Krai
- District: Slavgorod
- Time zone: UTC+7:00

Bursol (Russian: Бурсоль) is a rural locality (a settlement) in Slavgorod, Altai Krai, Russia. The population was 654 as of 2013. There are 9 streets.

== Geography ==
Lake Burlinskoye lies close to the southwest of the village.
