= Slavgorodskoye, Altai Krai =

Slavgorodskoye Славгородское
- Selo
- Location within Altai Krai Location within Russia
- Coordinates: 53°01′N 78°38′E
- Country: Russia
- Region: Altai Krai
- District: Slavgorod
- Time zone: UTC+7:00

Slavgorodskoye (Russian: Славгородское) is a rural locality (a selo) in Slavgorod, Altai Krai, Russia. The population was 3,557 as of 2013. There are 28 streets.
