= Uspenka Raion =

Uspenka Raion Успенський район
- Raion
- Country: Soviet Union
- Republic: Ukrainian SSR
- Oblast: Voroshylovhrad Oblast
- Established: 7 March 1923
- Abolished: 23 September 1959
- Admin. center: Uspenka

Uspenka Raion (Ukrainian: Успенський район) was a raion of Voroshylovhrad Oblast (now Luhansk Oblast) in the Ukrainian Soviet Socialist Republic from 1923 until 1959. Its administrative center was Uspenka.

== History ==
Uspenka Raion was established on 7 March 1923, originally in Luhansk Okruha of Donets Governorate. In December 1948, Pershozvanivka village council was transferred from Novosvitlivka Raion to Uspenka Raion. On 23 September 1959, Uspenka Raion was abolished, with its former territory distributed to Rovenky Raion and Oleksandrivsk Raion.
