= Belenkoye (lake, Tabunsky District) =

Salt lake in Altai Krai, Russia

- Беленькое
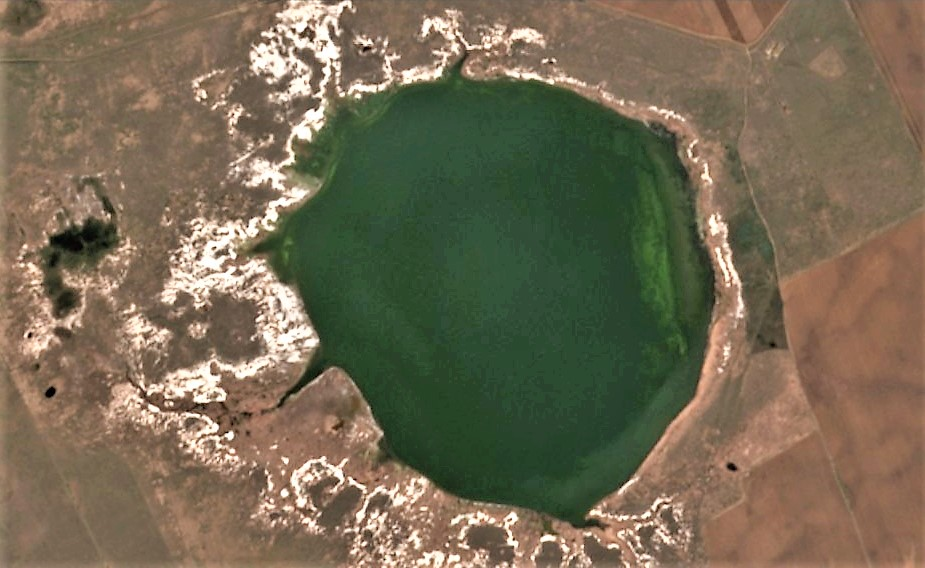
- Sentinel-2 image of the lake.

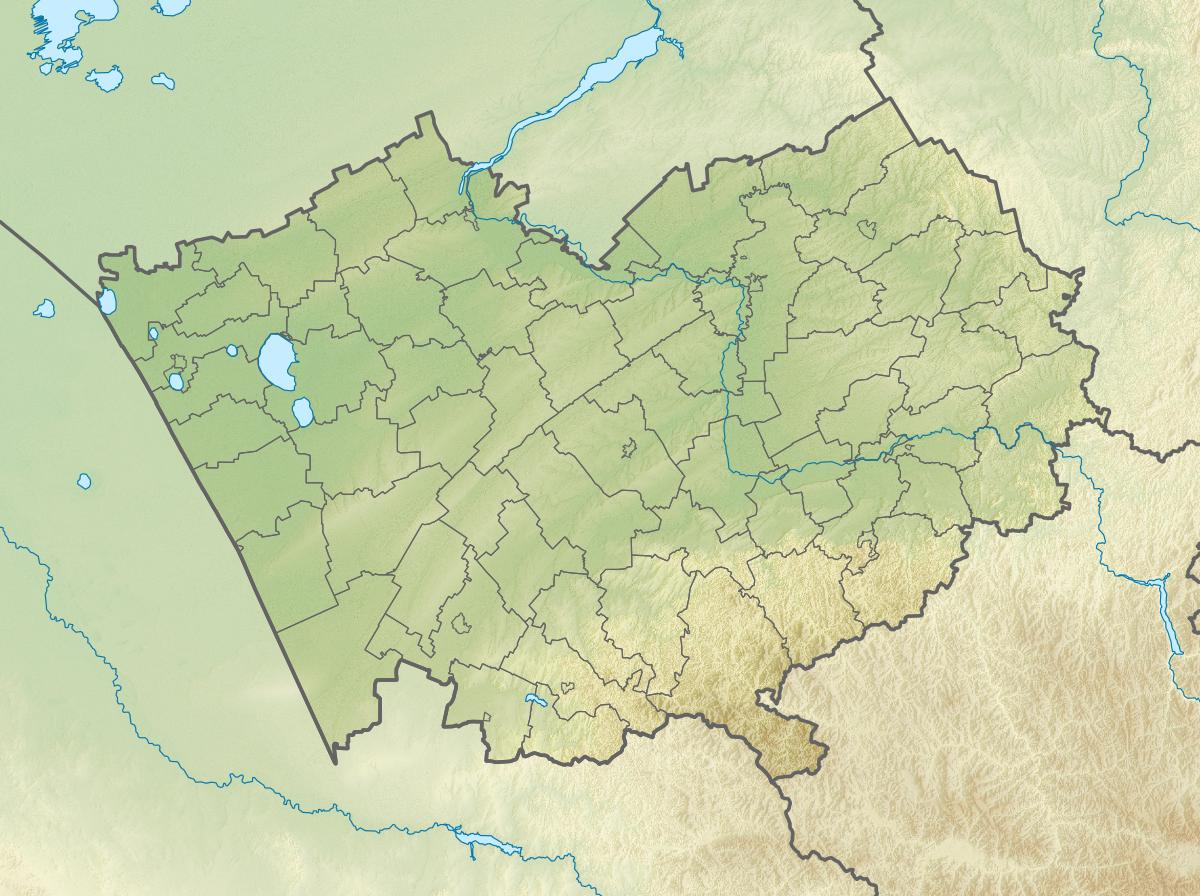
- Location within Altai Krai Location within Russia
- Location: Kulunda Steppe; West Siberian Plain
- Coordinates: 52°59′20″N 78°57′08″E
- Type: endorheic
- Catchment area: 477 square kilometers (184 sq mi)
- Basin countries: Russia
- Max. length: 2.7 kilometers (1.7 mi)
- Max. width: 2.3 kilometers (1.4 mi)
- Surface area: 4.6 square kilometers (1.8 sq mi)
- Water volume: 0.00676 cubic kilometers (0.00162 cu mi)
- Residence time: UTC+7
- Surface elevation: 105 meters (344 ft)

Belenkoye (Russian: Беленькое) is a salt lake in Tabunsky District, Altai Krai, Russian Federation.

The lake lies at the western end of the Krai. Bolsheromanovka is located 4 kilometers (2.5 mi) to the west of the western lakeshore and Tabuny, the district capital, lies 27 kilometers (17 mi) to the SSW of the lake. Other inhabited places nearby are Georgiyevka, 6 kilometers (3.7 mi) to the east, and Karpilovka 7 kilometers (4.3 mi) to the south.

== Geography ==
Belenkoye is located in a residual depression of the Kulunda Plain. It has a roughly round shape, with a diameter of about 2.6 kilometers (1.6 mi).

Lake Maloye Yarovoye lies 8 kilometers (5.0 mi) to the ENE, Belenkoye (Slavgorod Municipality) 23 kilometers (14 mi) in the same direction, Bolshoye Yarovoye 21 kilometers (13 mi) to the southwest, and lake Kulunda 25 kilometers (16 mi) to the east.

== Flora and fauna ==
The lake is surrounded by flat steppe landscape, salt pans and cultivated fields. Artemia salina crustaceans live in the lake and are periodically harvested for commercial purposes.

== See also ==
- List of lakes of Russia
