= Antratsyt Raion =

Former subdivision of Luhansk Oblast, Ukraine

Antratsyt Raion Антрацитівський район
- Raion
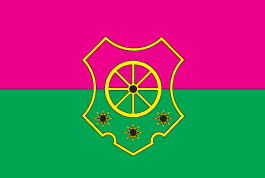
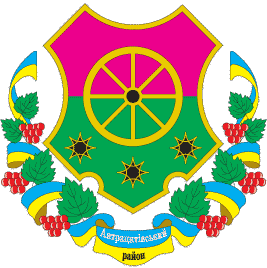
- Flag Coat of arms

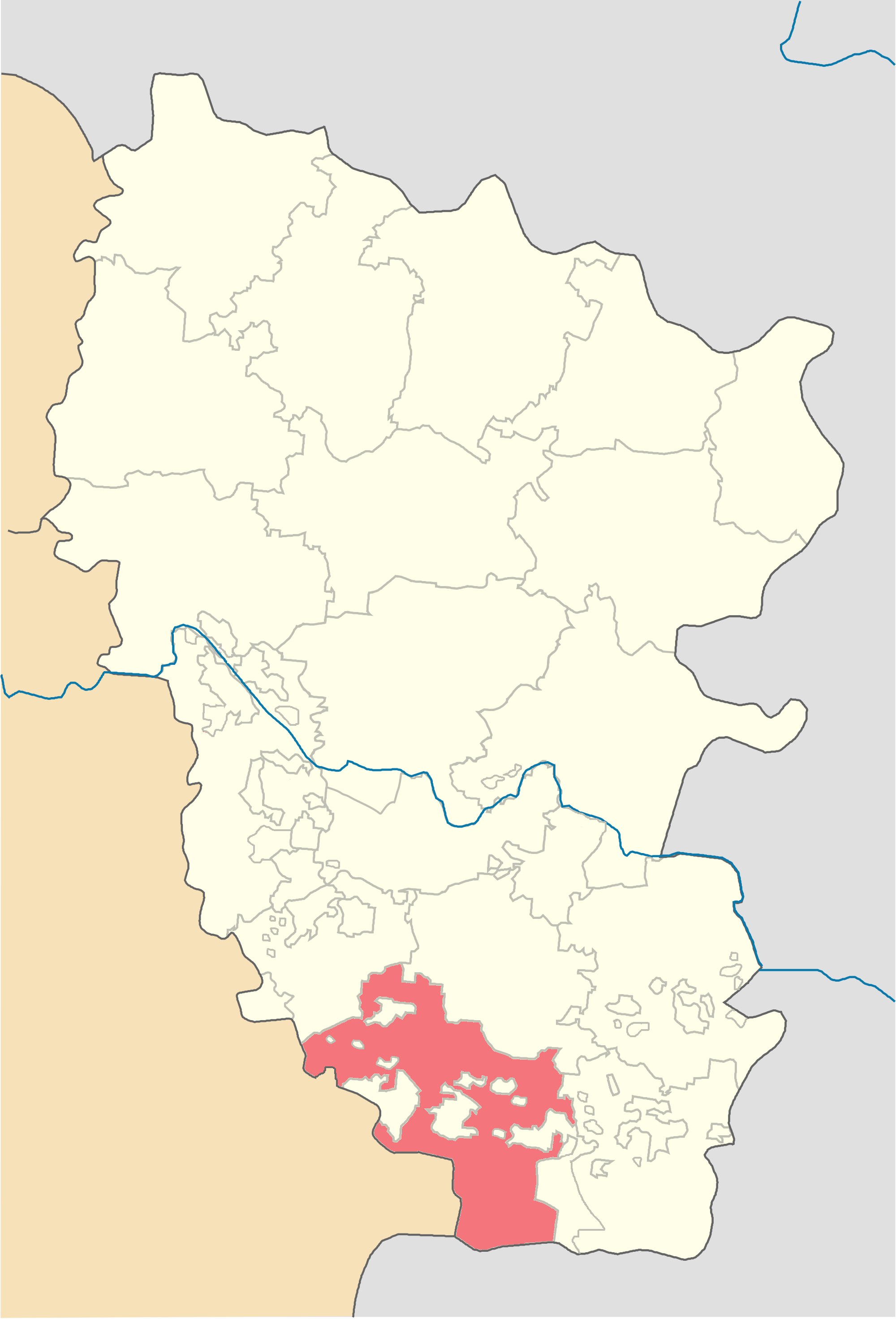
- Coordinates: 48°16′6″N 39°0′8″E
- Country: Ukraine
- Oblast: Luhansk Oblast
- Established: 1938
- Disestablished: 18 July 2020
- Admin. center: Antratsyt
- Subdivisions: List: 0 — city councils; 6 — settlement councils; 8 — rural councils; Number of localities: 0 — cities; 6 — urban-type settlements; 21 — villages; 15 — rural settlements

Area
  - Total: 1,700 km^{2} (660 sq mi)

Population (2020)
  - Total: 30,007 ▼
  - Density: 18/km^{2} (46/sq mi)
- Time zone: UTC+02:00 (EET)
  - Summer (DST): UTC+03:00 (EEST)
- Postal index: 94620—94697
- Area code: +380 6431
- Website: http://an.loga.gov.ua/

Antratsitovsky Municipal District Антрацитовский муниципальный округ (Russian)
- District

Other transcription(s)
  - Ukrainian: Антрацитівський район
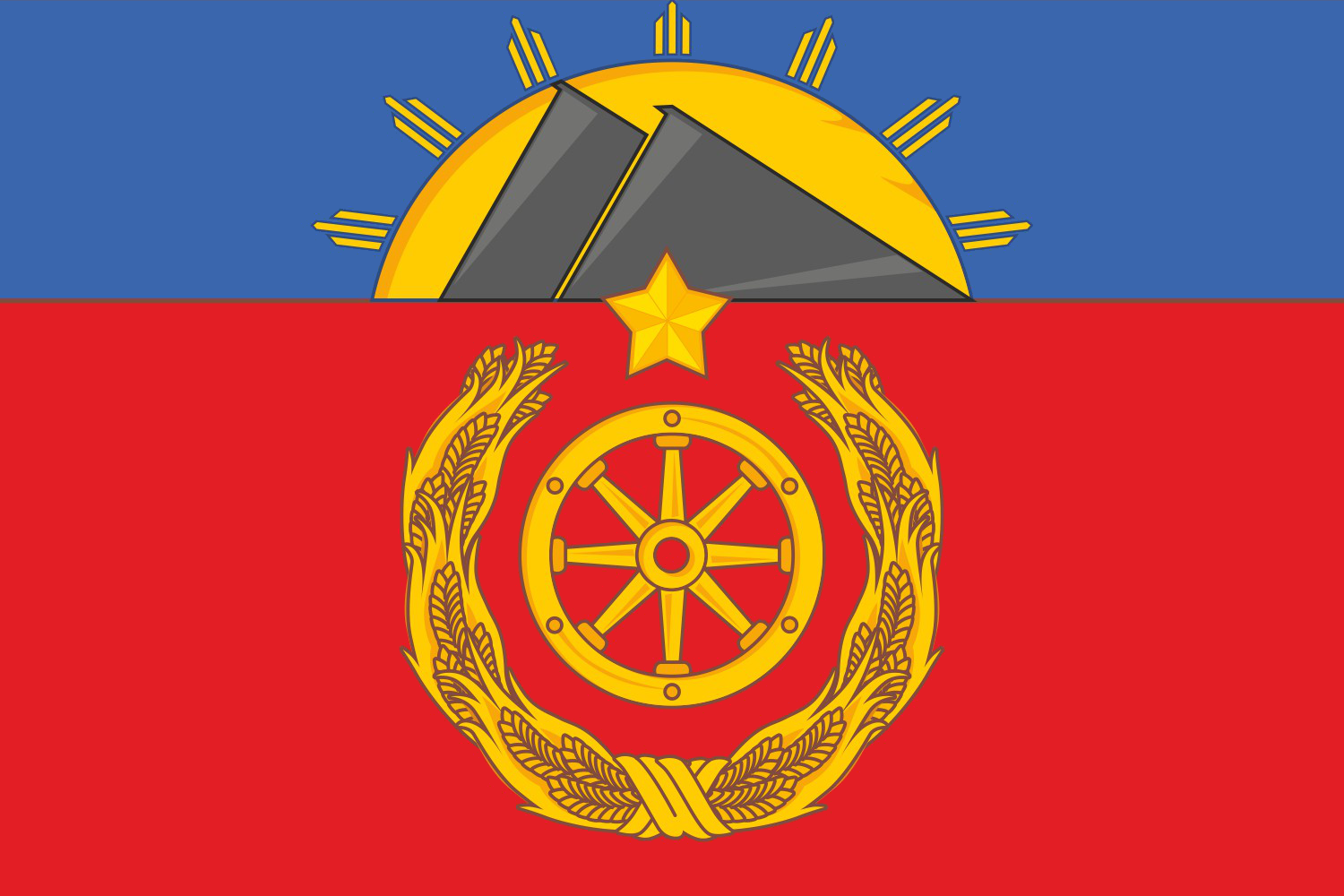
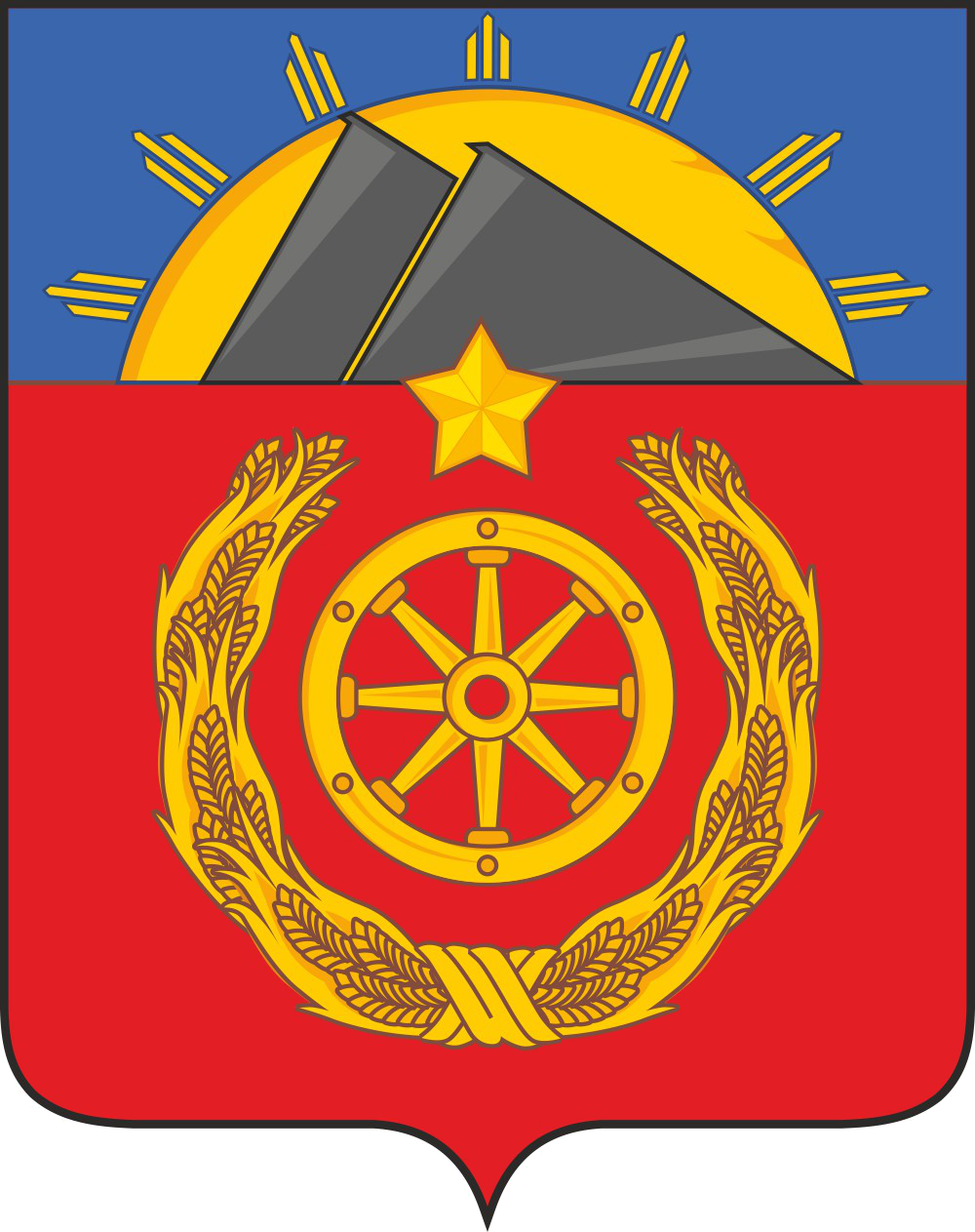
- Flag Coat of arms

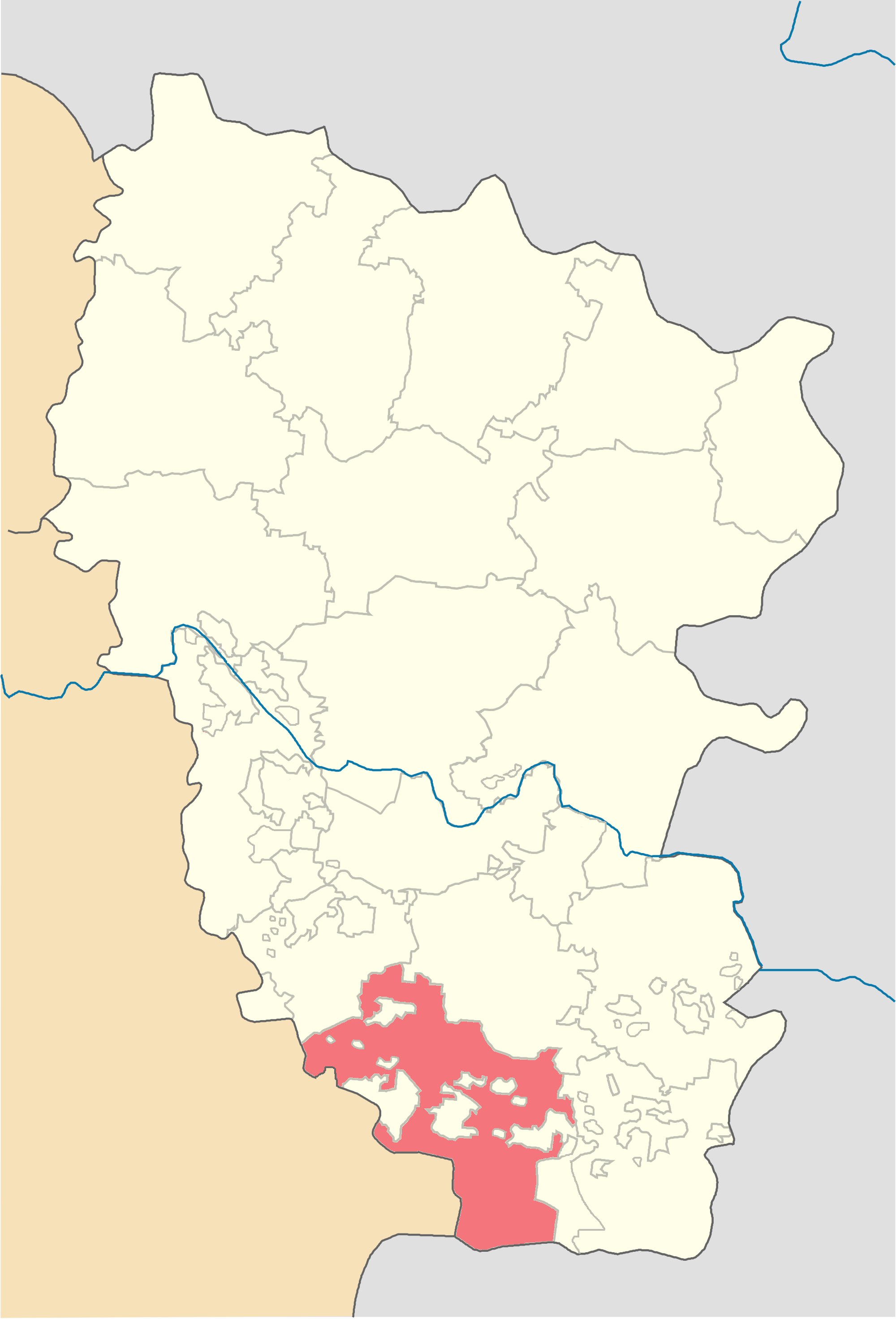
- Location of Antratsitovsky District in the Luhansk People's Republic
- Coordinates: 48°16′6″N 39°0′8″E
- Country: Russia
- Federal subject: Luhansk People's Republic
- Established: 1938
- Administrative center: Antratsitovsk

Area
  - Total: 1,700 km^{2} (660 sq mi)
- Website: https://antratsit.su

Antratsyt Raion (Ukrainian: Антрацитівський район; Russian: Антрацитовский район) was a raion (district) in Luhansk Oblast in eastern Ukraine between 1938 and 2020 and the de-facto district of the Luhansk People's Republic, a federal subject of Russia. Its administrative center was the city Antratsyt. The last estimate of the raion population, reported by the Ukrainian government, was 30,007 (2020 est.).

== Geography ==
Antratsyt Raion bordered Lutuhyne Raion to the north, Sverdlovsk Raion to the east, Perevalsk Raion to the northwest, Shakhtarsk Raion of Donetsk Oblast to the southwest, and Matveyevo-Kurgansky District of Rostov Oblast, Russia to the south.

== History ==
The raion was formed in 1938 during the times of the Soviet Union. It originally had the name Bokove-Antratsyt Raion, because Antratsyt was then known as Bokove-Antratsyt. The raion's territory was the site of fierce fighting during World War II. In 1949, a settlement council of Mine No. 33/37 was transferred from Bokove-Antratsyt Raion to Rovenky Raion.

In 1962, the city's name was shortened to Antratsyt, and it was made a city of regional significance; Antratsyt still served as the administrative center of the raion, but it was no longer a part of it, instead being subordinated directly to Luhansk Oblast. Bokove-Antratsyt Raion was also renamed Antratsyt Raion to match the new name of the city.

Since 2014, the area of the raion has been controlled by the pro-Russian Luhansk People's Republic (LPR).

The raion was abolished on 18 July 2020 as part of the administrative reform of Ukraine, which reduced the number of raions of Luhansk Oblast to eight with the raion being absorbed into the Luhansk Raion. However, the LPR challenged the reforms and continued using it as an administrative unit.

The National Resistance Center of Ukraine has reported that in July 2023, the Russians abducted 280 children from occupied Antratsyt Raion and took them to a "Cossack Cadet Corps" center in the Republic of Kalmykia for propagandizing and erasure of Ukrainian identity.

After Russia annexed the Luhansk Oblast as the Luhansk People's Republic on 30 September 2023, the Raion was also incorporated into Russia with Sergey Saenko as its first governor.

== Economy ==
The area of the former raion has large coal deposits, and precious metals. It also has significant deposits of sandstone, limestone, and raw materials used to make bricks and tiles.

== Demographics ==
Population history
Year	Pop.	±% p.a.
1968	56,300	—
1999	39,800	−1.11%
2020	30,007	−1.34%

As of the 2001 Ukrainian census:

Ethnicity

- Ukrainians: 62.8%
- Russians: 35.7%
- Belarusians: 0.4%
