= Ulken Azhbolat =

Bittern salt lake in Uspen District, Pavlodar Region, Kazakhstan

- Үлкен Әжболат / Большой Ажбулат
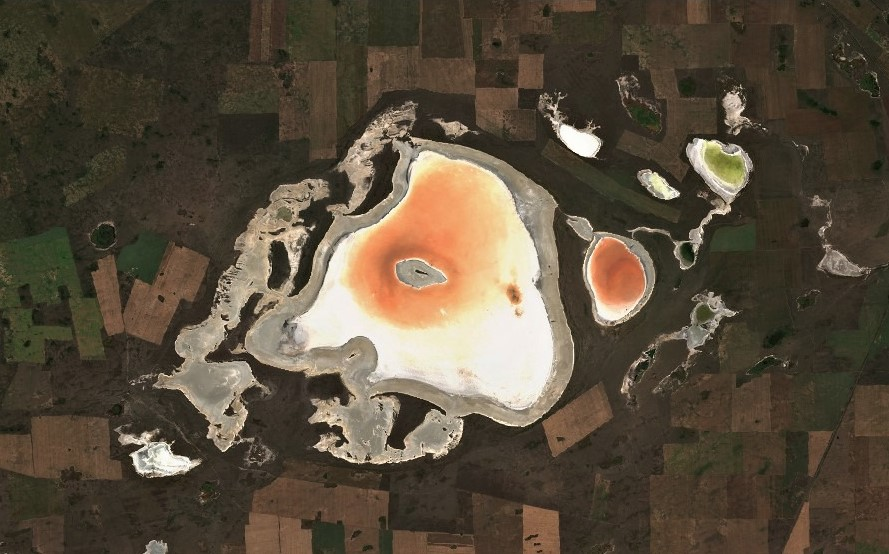
- Sentinel-2 image of the lake

- Location within Kazakhstan
- Location: West Siberian Plain
- Coordinates: 53°16′43″N 77°24′51″E
- Type: endorheic
- Primary inflows: Burla
- Basin countries: Kazakhstan
- Max. length: 16 kilometers (9.9 mi)
- Max. width: 12 kilometers (7.5 mi)
- Surface elevation: 93 meters (305 ft)
- Islands: One

Ulken Azhbolat (Kazakh: Үлкен Әжболат; Russian: Большой Ажбулат, Bolshoy Azhbulat) is a bittern salt lake in Uspen District, Pavlodar Region, Kazakhstan.

The lake lies 100 kilometers (62 mi) to the NNE of Pavlodar town, 45 kilometers (28 mi) north of Uspenka, the district capital, and 10 kilometers (6.2 mi) west of Lozovoye. There are mirabilite deposits in the lake area.

== Geography ==
Lake Ulken Azhbolat is an endorheic lake located in the Kulunda Steppe, southern part of the West Siberian Plain, west of the Russian border. There is an elongated island in the middle of the lake. The Burla river flows into the eastern lakeshore. In years of adequate rainfall the river reaches the lake, but in dry years it ends in Lake Bolshoye Topolnoye, located 22 kilometers (14 mi) to the east, on the other side of the Kazakhstan–Russia border.

There are smaller lakes in the immediate vicinity of Ulken Azhbolat, including Kishi Azhbolat (Кіші Әжболат), an intermittent lake on the eastern side, as well as Lake Klevkino (Клевкино) on the southern. Lake Shagan straddles the international border 17 kilometers (11 mi) to the northeast, Ulken Tobylzhan lies 45 kilometers (28 mi) to the south, lake Burlinskoye 57 kilometers (35 mi) to the ESE, lake Bolshoye Yarovoye 77 kilometers (48 mi) to the southeast and lake Kyzyltuz 60 kilometers (37 mi) to the northwest.

== See also ==
- List of lakes of Kazakhstan
