= Burlinskoye =

Salt lake in Altai Krai, Russia

- Бурлинское
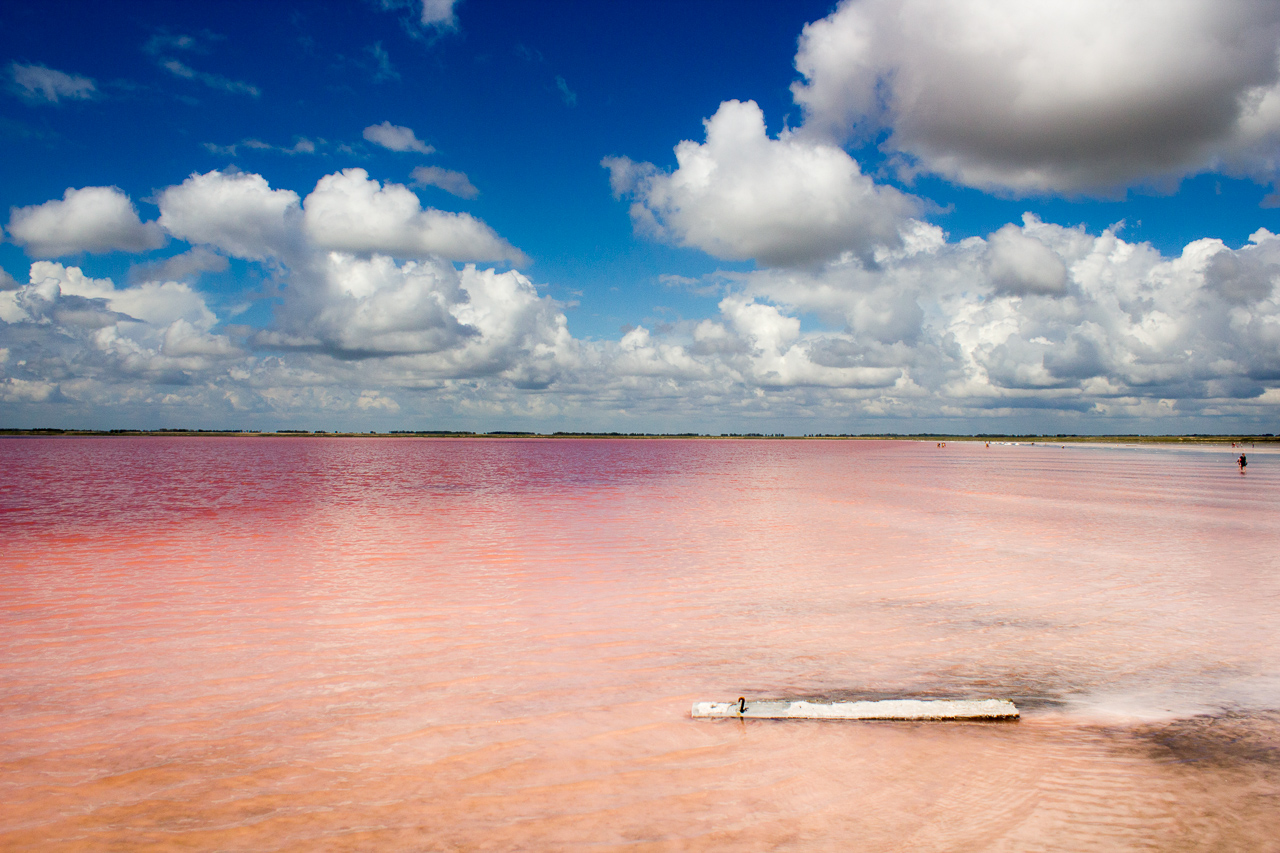
- Panorama of the lake and its pink waters

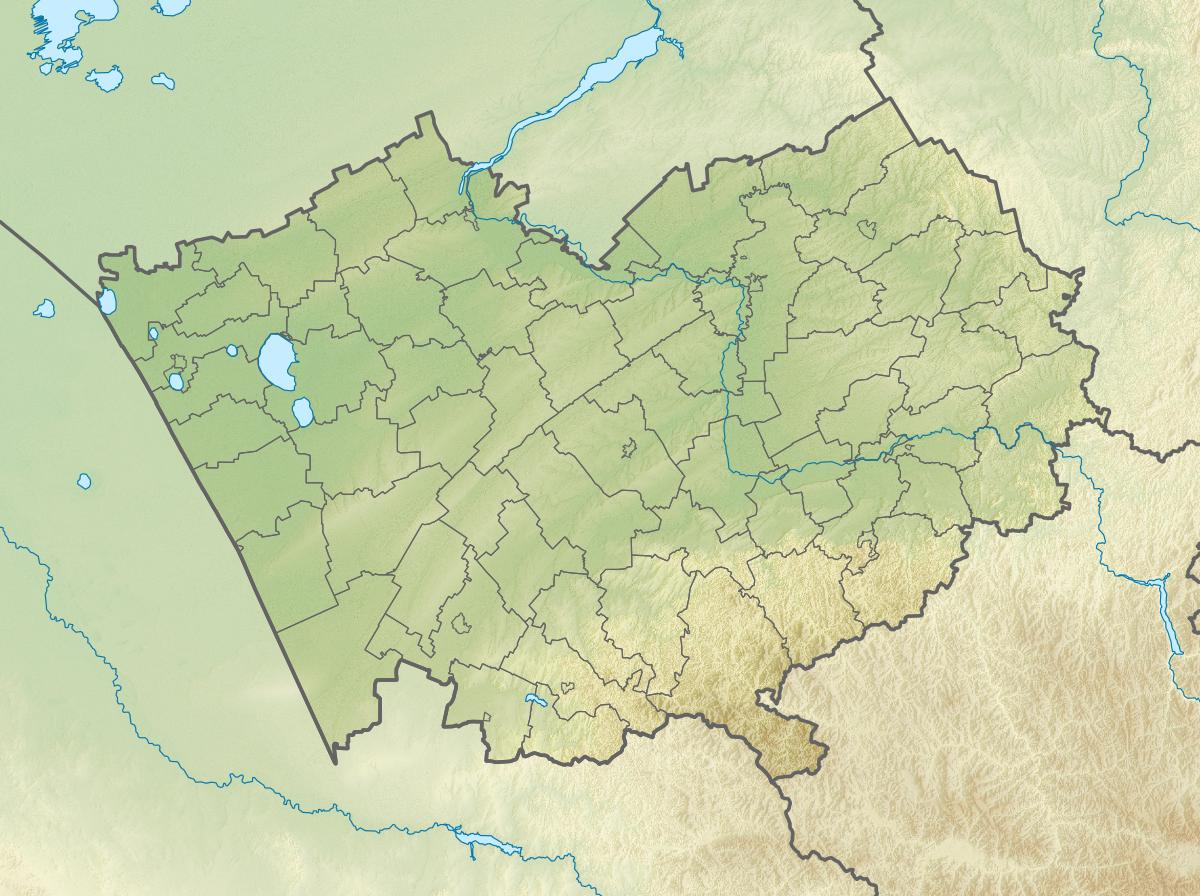
- Location within Altai Krai Location within Russia
- Location: Kulunda Plain; West Siberian Plain
- Coordinates: 53°08′12″N 78°24′51″E
- Type: endorheic
- Catchment area: 1,720 square kilometers (660 sq mi)
- Basin countries: Russia
- Max. length: 7.7 kilometers (4.8 mi)
- Max. width: 4.6 kilometers (2.9 mi)
- Surface area: 31.3 square kilometers (12.1 sq mi)
- Average depth: 1.6 meters (5 ft 3 in)
- Residence time: UTC+6
- Surface elevation: 87 meters (285 ft)
- Islands: None

Burlinskoye (Russian: Бурлинское) is a salt lake in Slavgorod municipality, Altai Krai, Russian Federation.

The lake is located at the northwestern end of the Krai. The nearest inhabited places are Bursol, located by the northeastern shore, and Slavgorod 17 kilometers (11 mi) to the southeast. The western shore lies 18 kilometers (11 mi) to the east of the Kazakhstan–Russia border. Burlinskoye is a tourist attraction owing to the seasonal pink color of its waters.

== History ==
Table salt has been mined at the lake since 1762. At the time of the USSR a small railway was built from Bursol village in the east to the middle of the lake in order to facilitate salt extraction. The rails barely rise above the lake surface. Salt mining was interrupted in 1998 but was resumed in 2010.

The train used for collecting and transporting salt.

== Geography ==
Burlinskoye lies in the Kulunda Plain, part of the West Siberian Plain. The lakeshore is flanked by steep between 3 meters (9.8 ft) and 5 meters (16 ft) high cliff-like banks in the north, west and south, but it is flat and swampy on the eastern side. The pink color of the lake is seasonal, small intermittent streams flow into the lake during the spring season, turning the water green and making the level of the lake rise.

Lake Bolshoye Yarovoye lies 23 kilometers (14 mi) to the SSE, Peschanoye 26 kilometers (16 mi) to the NNE, Bolshoye Topolnoye 24 kilometers (15 mi) to the northwest and Maloye Yarovoye 43 kilometers (27 mi) to the ESE. Bolshoy Azhbulat lies in Kazakhstan, 57 kilometers (35 mi) to the WNW.

== Flora ==
There are no aquatic plants in the lake. Clubmoss and sedges, such as Cyperus fuscus and Blysmus rufus grow in some areas near the shore.

== See also ==
- List of lakes of Russia
- Pink lake
