= Chagan (lake, Kulunda Steppe) =

Lake in Kazakhstan and Russia

- Чаган / Шаған
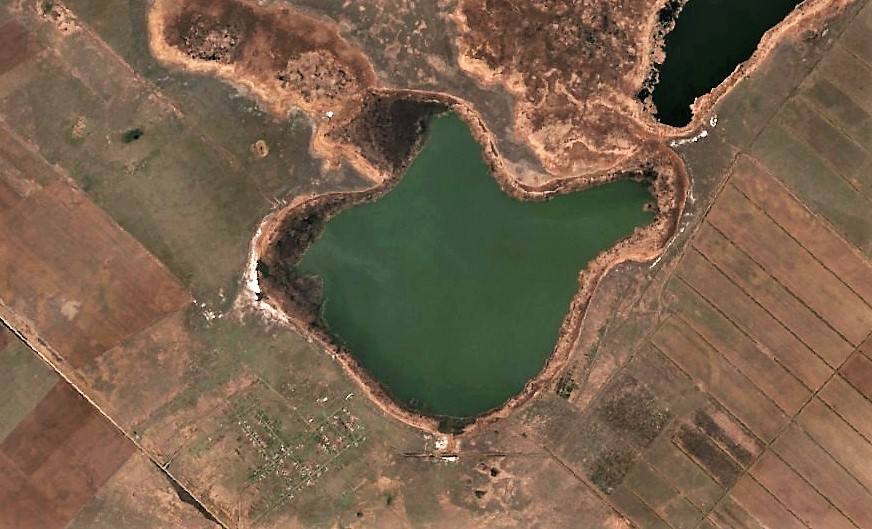
- Sentinel-2 image.

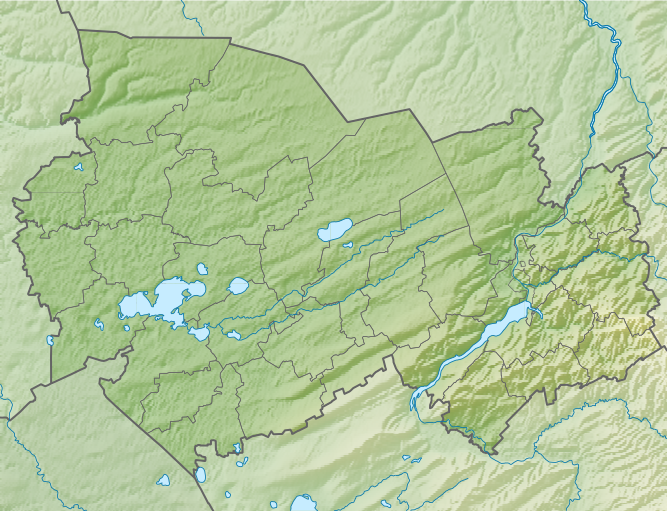
- Location within Novosibirsk Oblast Location within Kazakhstan
- Location: Kulunda Plain
- Coordinates: 53°27′41″N 77°36′24″E
- Type: Endorheic
- Basin countries: Kazakhstan; Russia
- Max. length: 4.6 kilometers (2.9 mi)
- Max. width: 3.1 kilometers (1.9 mi)
- Surface area: 8.4 square kilometers (3.2 sq mi)
- Residence time: UTC+5 & UTC+7
- Surface elevation: 101 meters (331 ft)
- Islands: none
- Settlements: Bogatyr

Chagan (Russian: Чаган; Kazakh: Шаған) is a salt lake in Karasuksky District, Novosibirsk Oblast, Russia, with a small part in Uspen District, Pavlodar Region, Kazakhstan.

Lake Chagan is located at the Russia-Kazakhstan border. Bogatyr town lies by the southwestern shore, in the Kazakh side, and now abandoned Pervomaysky village by the southeastern shore, in the Russian side. The latter was abolished in 2011.

== Geography ==
The lake lies in the northern part of the Kulunda Plain. The Kazakhstan–Russia border runs diagonally off the shore from northwest to southeast across the southwestern side. Most of the lake is within Russian territory.

Lake Chagan has a roughly square shape, with one large bay in the northeast and a smaller one in the northern shore.

Lake Kalininskoye lies 1 kilometer (0.62 mi) to the northeast, Studyonoye 10 kilometers (6.2 mi) to the north, Ulken Azhbolat 17 kilometers (11 mi) to the southwest, and Bolshoye Topolnoye 22 kilometers (14 mi) to the southeast.

== See also ==
- List of lakes of Kazakhstan
- List of lakes of Russia
