= Rovenky Raion (abolished 1963) =

Rovenky Raion Ровеньківський район
- Raion
- Country: Soviet Union
- Republic: Ukrainian SSR
- Oblast: None (until 1932); Donetsk Oblast (1932–1938); Voroshylovhrad Oblast (1938–1963)
- Abolished: January 1963
- Admin. center: Rovenky

Rovenky Raion (Ukrainian: Ровеньківський район) was a raion (district) of Voroshylovhrad Oblast (now Luhansk Oblast) in the Ukrainian Soviet Socialist Republic until 1963. Its center was the city of Rovenky.

== History ==
Starting on July 2, 1932, Rovenky Raion was included as one of the seventeen administrative divisions of the newly created Donetsk Oblast of the Ukrainian Soviet Socialist Republic. Prior to then, it had been a "territorial unit of the Donbas", unassigned to any oblast of Ukraine. In December 1932, Rovenky Raion was included on a list of districts deemed by the Soviet Ukrainian government to be "lagging behind on grain procurement", and thus had its access to imported industrial products cut off by the government.

In 1938, Donetsk Oblast was renamed Stalino Oblast, and in June that same year, Rovenky Raion, along with several other districts of Stalino Oblast, was split off to form Voroshylovhrad Oblast.

In 1946, during the 1946 Soviet election in Ukraine, Rovenky Raion and Sverdlovsk Raion were grouped together as the "Rovenky electoral district". On November 15, 1948, a settlement council of Mine No. 33/37 was transferred from Bokove-Antratsyt Raion to Rovenky Raion. In 1959, Uspenka Raion was abolished, and some of its former territory was transferred to Rovenky Raion.

In January 1963, Rovenky Raion was abolished.
