= Yarovoye, Altai Krai =

Town in Altai Krai, Russia

Yarovoye Яровое
- Town
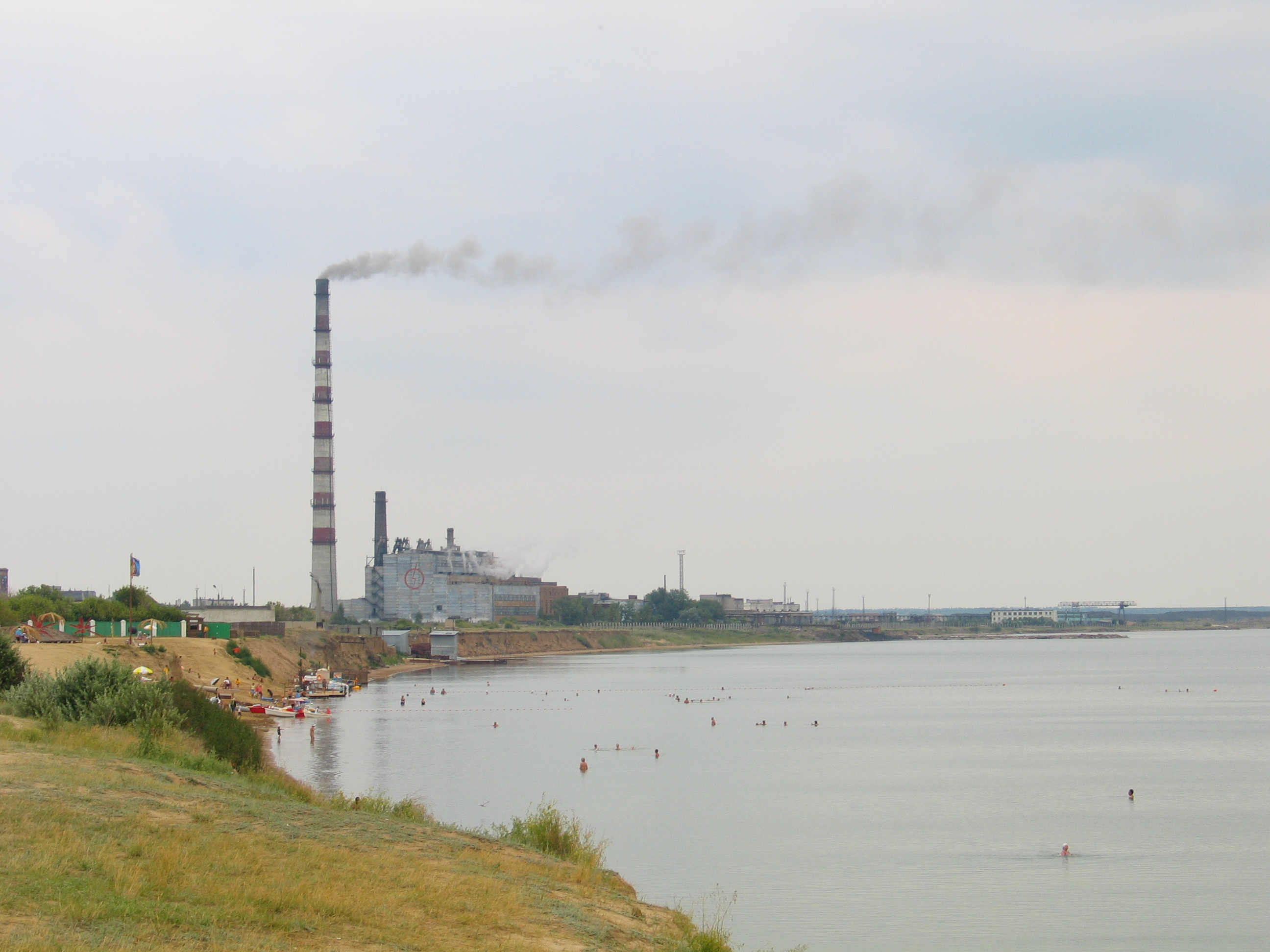
- Lake Bolshoye Yarovoye and the chemical plant in Yarovoye

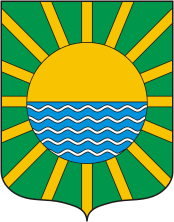
- Flag Coat of arms
- Interactive map of Yarovoye
- Location of Yarovoye Yarovoye (Altai Krai)
- Coordinates: 52°56′N 78°35′E
- Country: Russia
- Federal subject: Altai Krai
- Founded: 1943
- Town status since: 1993

Area
  - Total: 44.38 km^{2} (17.14 sq mi)
- Elevation: 95 m (312 ft)

Population (2010 Census)
  - Total: 18,604
  - Estimate (2025): 16,406 (−11.8%)
  - Density: 419.2/km^{2} (1,086/sq mi)

Administrative status
  - Subordinated to: town of krai significance of Yarovoye
  - Capital of: town of krai significance of Yarovoye

Municipal status
  - Urban okrug: Yarovoye Urban Okrug
  - Capital of: Yarovoye Urban Okrug
- Time zone: UTC+7 (MSK+4)
- Postal codes: 658837, 658839
- OKTMO ID: 01730000001
- Website: yarovoe.org

Yarovoye (Russian: Ярово́е) is a town in Altai Krai, Russia, located on the north shore of lake Bolshoye Yarovoye, 402 kilometers (250 mi) west of Barnaul, the administrative center of the krai. Population: 18,604 (2010 census); 21,363 (2002 census); 21,784 (1989 Soviet census).

== History ==
It was established in 1943 and was granted town status in 1993.

== Administrative and municipal status ==
Within the framework of administrative divisions, it is incorporated as the town of krai significance of Yarovoye—an administrative unit with the status equal to that of the districts. As a municipal division, the town of krai significance of Yarovoye is incorporated as Yarovoye Urban Okrug.

== Social status ==
Yarovoye is a popular resort that welcomes around 2 million people per summer season (June-August). The city gained popularity in the 1980s, even before "Prichal" came to build the tourist infrastructure. The Salt Lake "Big Yarovoye" is the main benefit of the city. Tourists come to breathe the healthy air, float on top of the water and walk on the healing black dirt that lies underground of the lake.
