= Slavgorodskoye, Belgorod Oblast =

Slavgorodskoye Славгородское
- Selo
- Location within Belgorod Oblast Location within Russia
- Coordinates: 50°28′N 38°53′E
- Country: Russia
- Region: Belgorod Oblast
- District: Alexeyevsky District
- Time zone: UTC+3:00

Slavgorodskoye (Russian: Славгородское) is a rural locality (a selo) in Alexeyevsky District, Belgorod Oblast, Russia. The population was 276 as of 2010. There are 8 streets.

== Geography ==
Slavgorodskoye is located 32 km southeast of Alexeyevka (the district's administrative centre) by road. Kopanets is the nearest rural locality.
