= Uspenka =

Rural locality in Luhansk Oblast, Ukraine

Uspenka Успенка
- Rural settlement
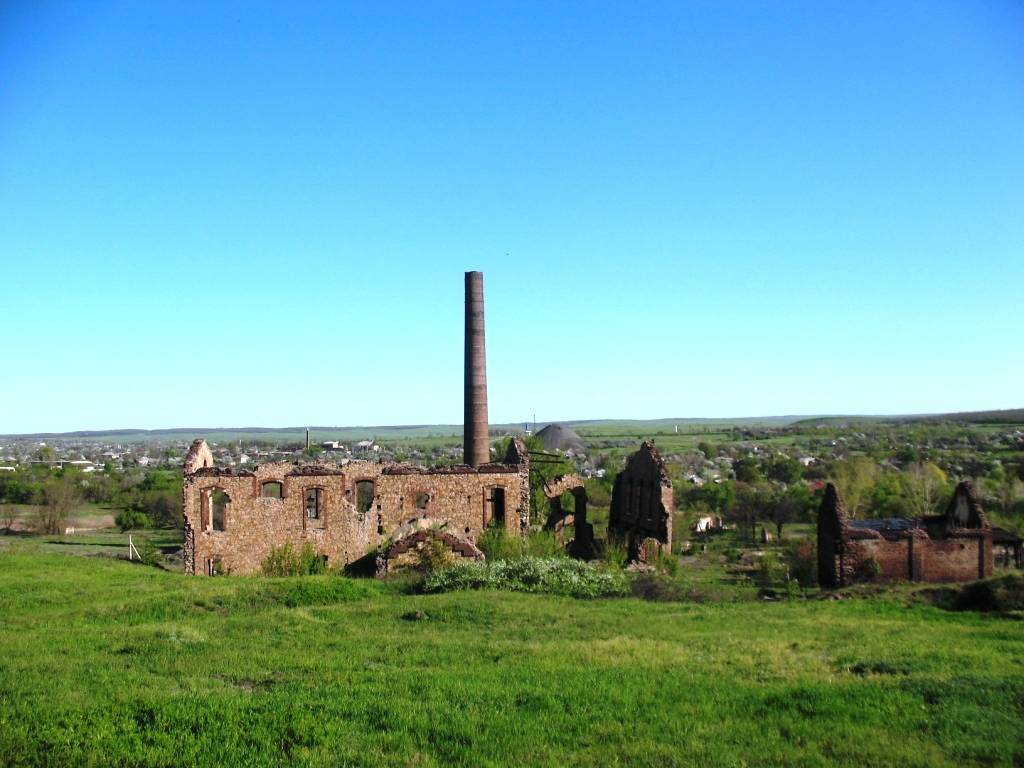
- Ruins of a former coke works, with Uspenka behind it

- Location of Uspenka within Luhansk Raion Location of Uspenka within Ukraine
- Coordinates: 48°23′38″N 39°9′13″E
- Country: Ukraine
- Oblast: Luhansk Oblast
- Raion: Luhansk Raion
- Hromada: Lutuhyne urban hromada
- Founded: 1755
- Incorporated: 1938

Area
  - Total: 4.69 km^{2} (1.81 sq mi)

Population (2022)
  - Total: 8,550
  - Density: 1,820/km^{2} (4,720/sq mi)
- Postal code: 92006
- Area code: +380 6436

Uspenka (Ukrainian: Успенка) is a rural settlement in Lutuhyne urban hromada, Luhansk Raion, Luhansk Oblast (region), Ukraine. It is located in the eastern part of the greater Donbas region. Population: 8,550 (2022 estimate), 8,895 (2013 est.).

== History ==
The village was founded as Olkhova (Ukrainian: Ольхова) in 1755 by fugitive serfs. The name "Uspenka" became established in 1764. The town has a long history of coal mining, with the first mine established in 1802.

A library was opened in Uspenka in 1914. Beginning in 1923, Uspenka served as the administrative center of Uspenka Raion within Luhansk Oblast. This status spurred on rapid economic growth. In 1938, it received the status of an urban-type settlement.

During World War II, Uspenka was captured by forces of Nazi Germany on July 17, 1942. The Nazis committed numerous massacres and abuses against the people during the occupation. After heavy fighting, the Red Army liberated Uspenka on February 18, 1943.

In 1959, Uspenka Raion was abolished and Uspenka became part of Oleksandrivsk Raion. From 1963 to 1965, it then was made part of Artemivsky District of the city Luhansk, before being transferred to Lutuhyne Raion in 1965.

The population of the village has greatly declined with the mining and coke industries: in 1966, there were 18,800 residents; in 2001, only 9676. There is still a coke works in the village that employs some residents, but many commute to Lutuhyne for work. Since 2014, Uspenka has been controlled by forces of the Luhansk People's Republic.

== Demographics ==
As of the 2001 Ukrainian census, Uspenka had a population of 9,676 inhabitants. The linguistic composition of the population was as follows:

Native languages in Uspenka
	percent
Ukrainian	69.4%
Russian	29.7%
Armenian	0.4%
Romani	0.2%
Romanian	0.1%
Belarusian	0.1%
others	0.1%

== Gallery ==
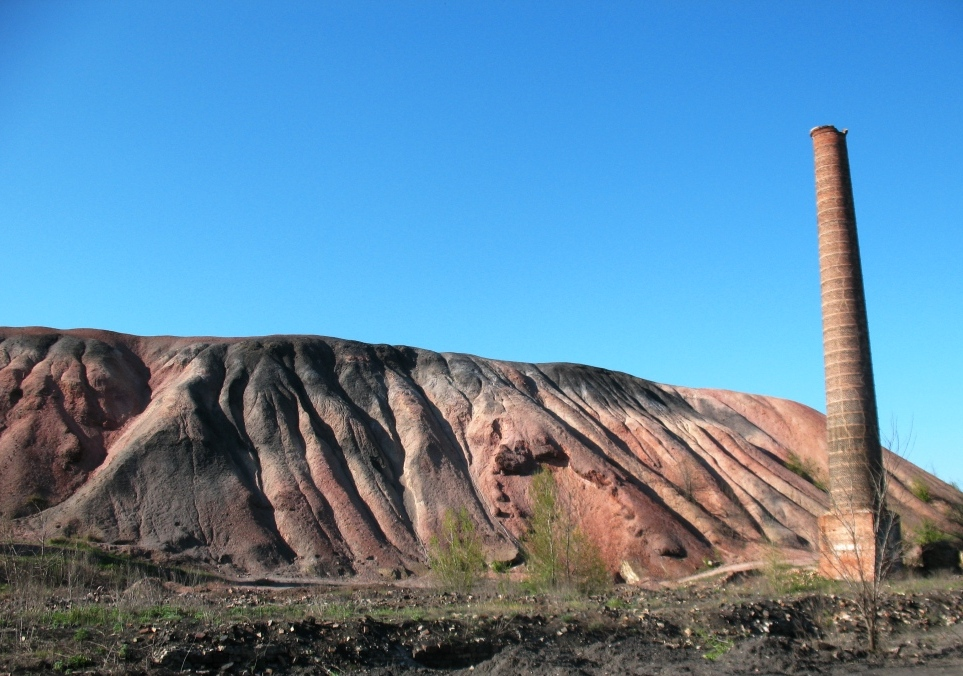
Heaps at former coke works

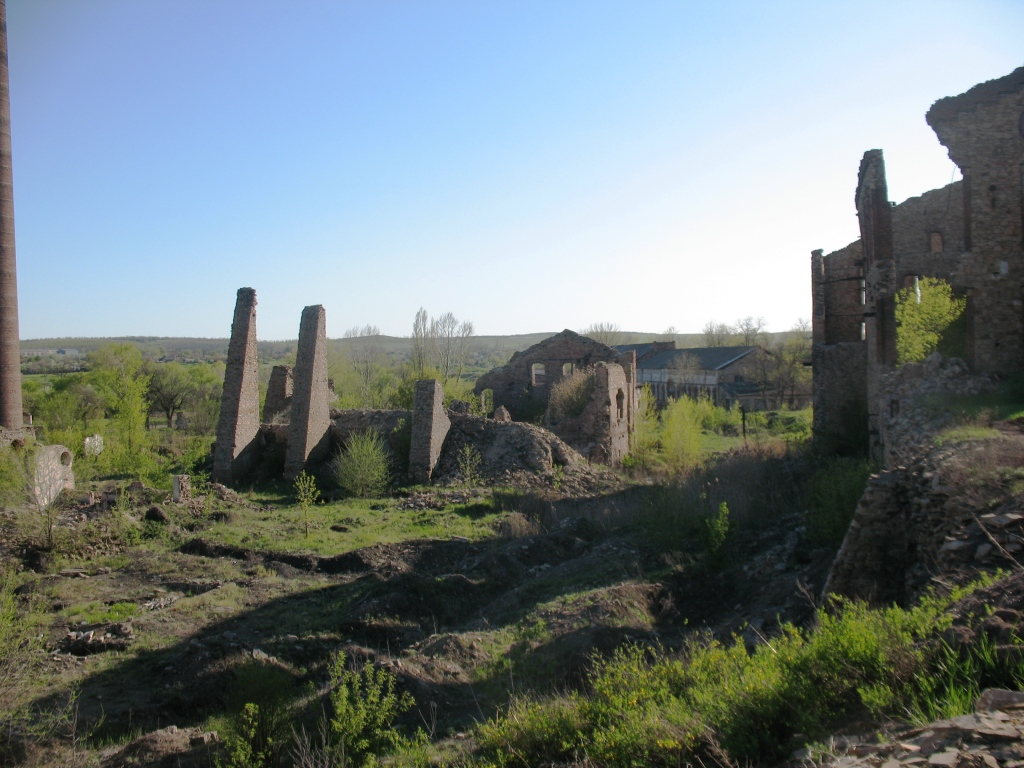
Ruins of a coke works

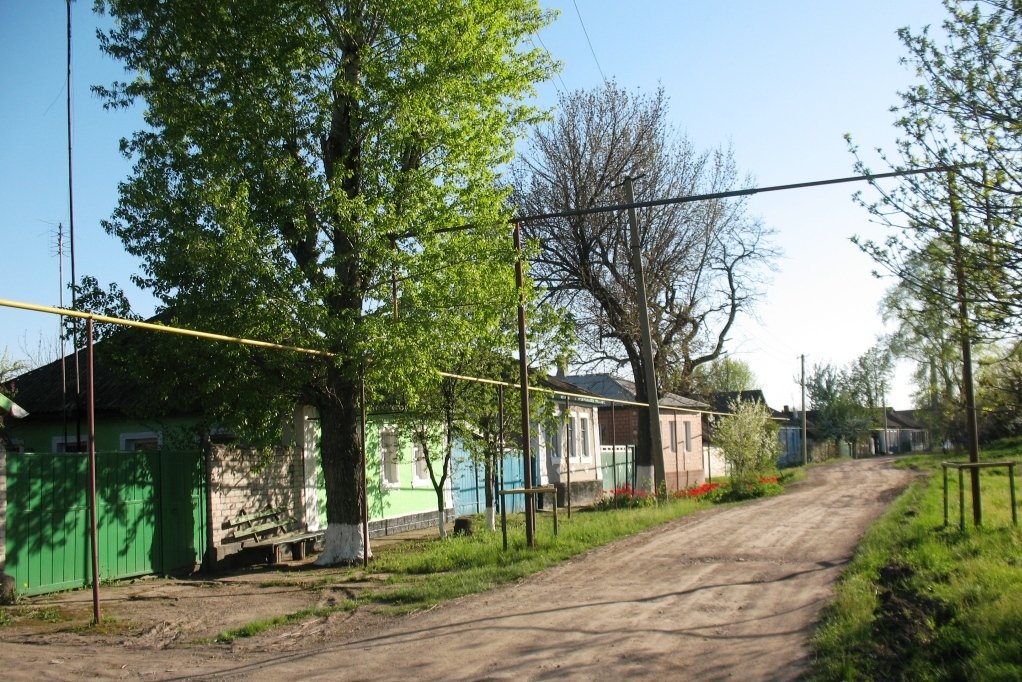
Street in Uspenka

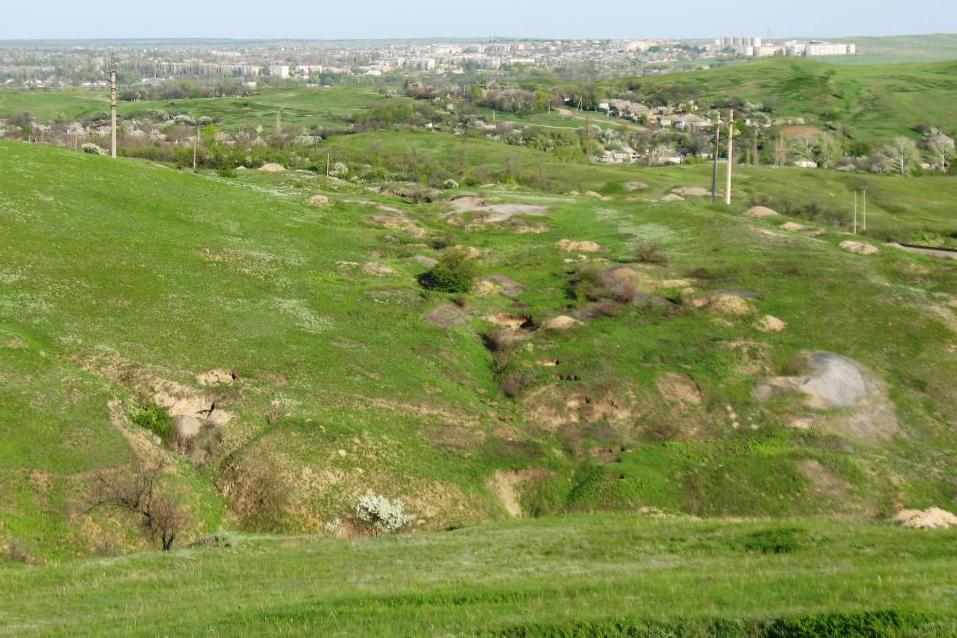
View of Uspenka and the town of Lutuhyne beyond.

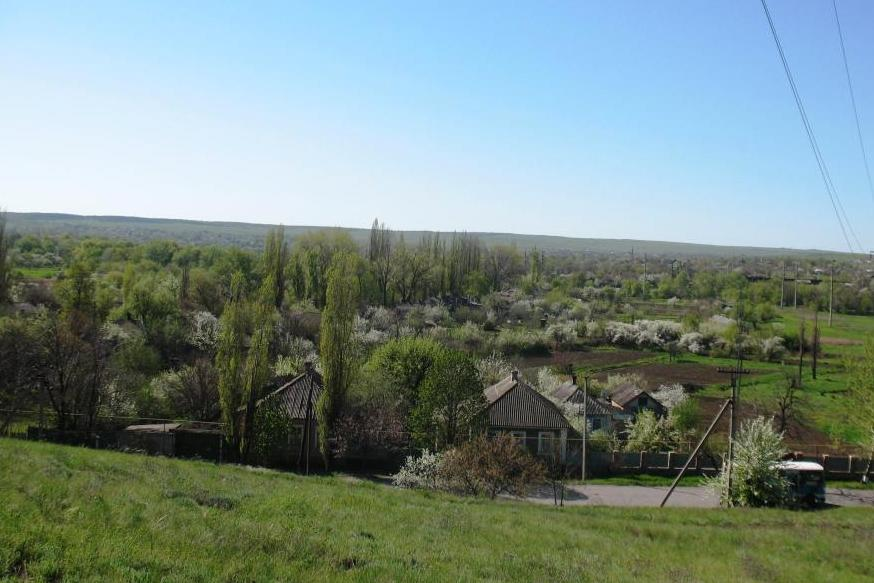
View of Uspenka
