= Bolshoye Yarovoye =

Salt lake in Altai Krai, Russia

- Большое Яровое
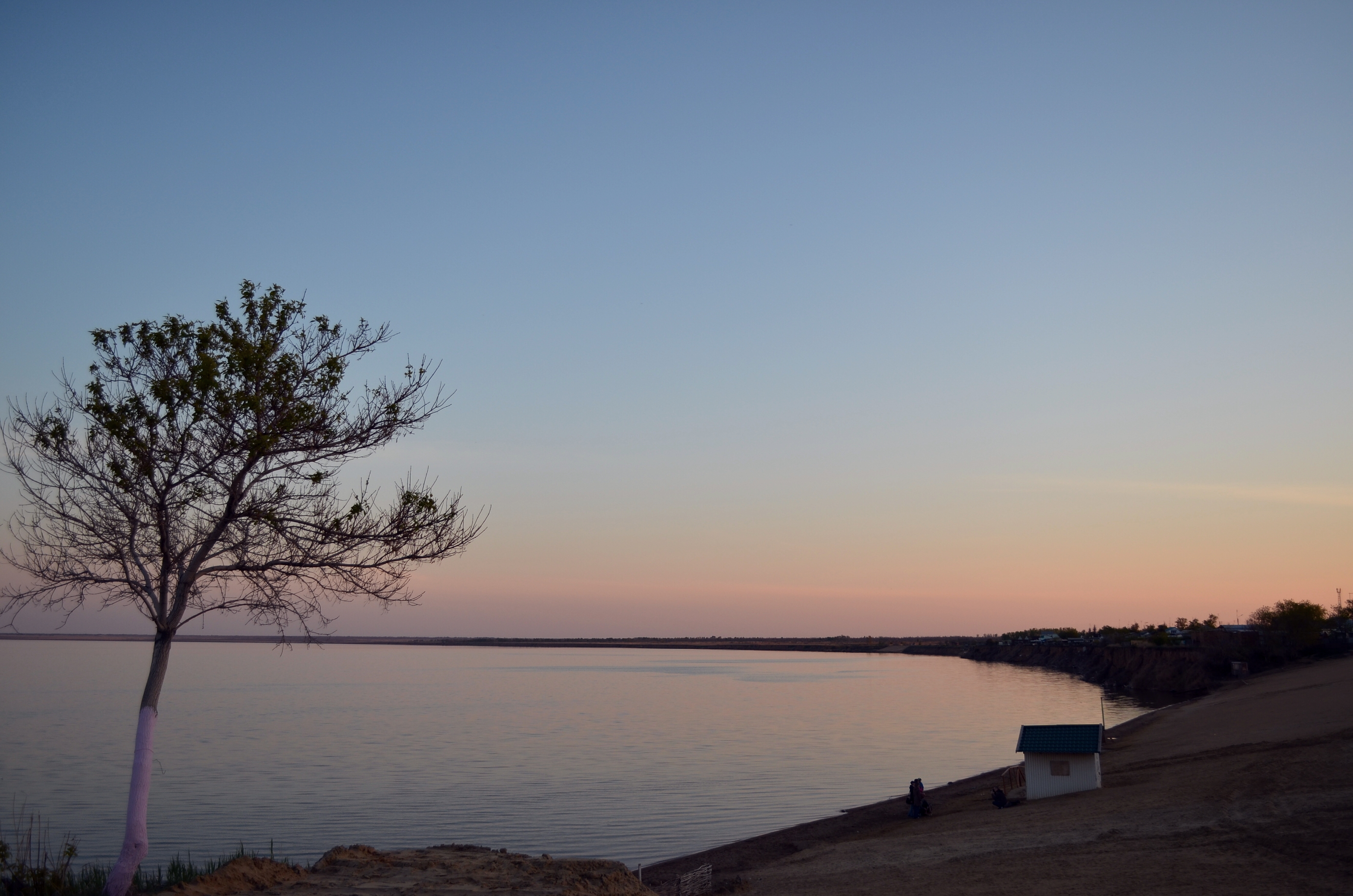
- Twilight panorama of the lake

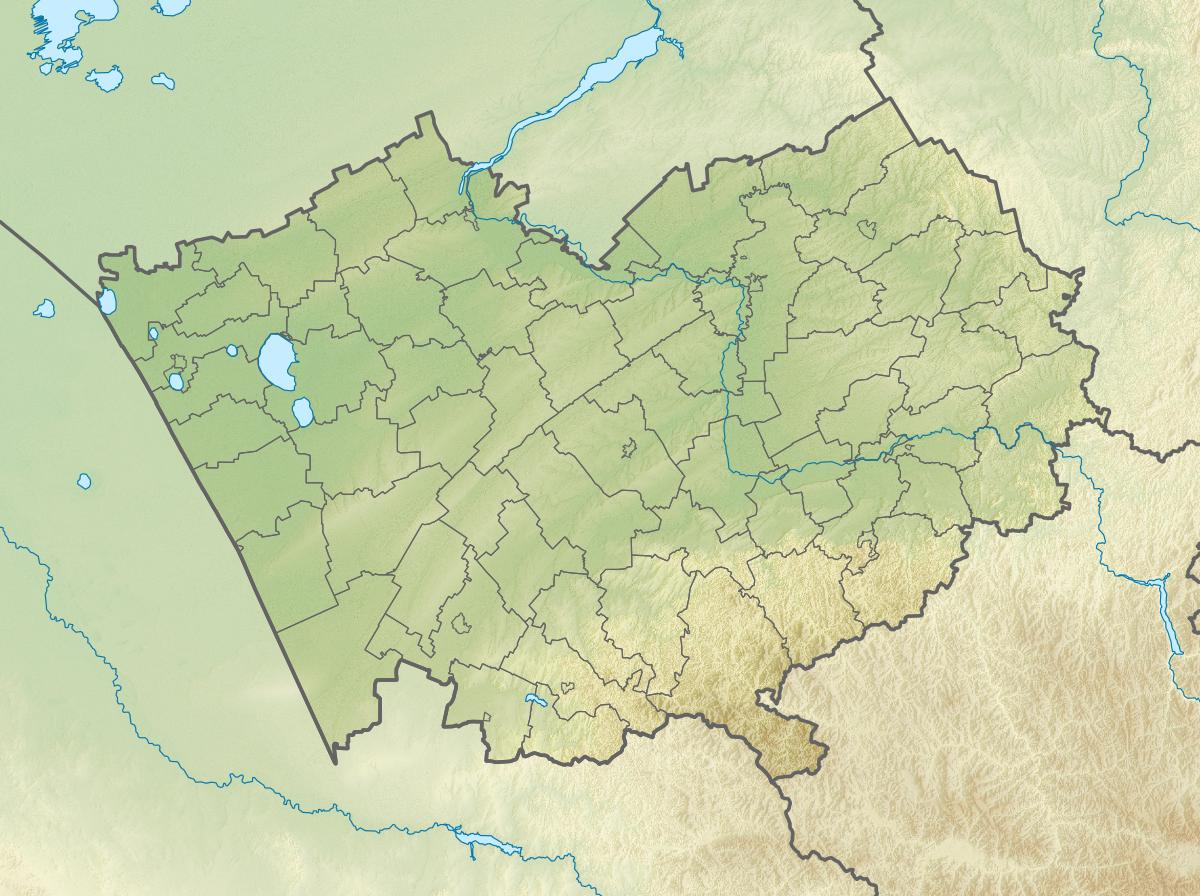
- Location within Altai Krai Location within Russia
- Location: Kulunda Plain; West Siberian Plain
- Coordinates: 52°52′12″N 78°36′45″E
- Type: endorheic
- Catchment area: 1,210 square kilometers (470 sq mi)
- Basin countries: Russia
- Max. length: 11.5 kilometers (7.1 mi)
- Max. width: 8.4 kilometers (5.2 mi)
- Surface area: 66.7 square kilometers (25.8 sq mi)
- Average depth: 4.4 meters (14 ft)
- Max. depth: 8 meters (26 ft)
- Residence time: UTC+6
- Surface elevation: 80 meters (260 ft)
- Islands: None

Bolshoye Yarovoye (Russian: Большое Яровое, lit. 'Big Yarovoye') is a salt lake in Altai Krai, Russian Federation. Administratively the lake falls within the limits of Slavgorod and Yarovoye municipalities, as well as Tabunsky District.

The lake is located at the northwestern end of the Krai. The nearest inhabited places are Yarovoye, located by the northern shore, and Slavgorod 7 kilometers (4.3 mi) to the north of the northern end. The western shore lies barely 11 kilometers (6.8 mi) to the east of the Kazakhstan–Russia border. Bolshoye Yarovoye is a tourist attraction and a protected area.

At the time of the USSR the Altaikhimprom company extracted bromine from the brine of the lake.

== Geography ==
Located in the Kulunda Plain, part of the West Siberian Plain, it is one of the largest lakes in Altai Krai. Bolshoye Yarovoye has an oval shape, roughly oriented from north to south. The lakeshore is sloping. The water level of the lake is subject to variations. In snowy or rainy years, its surface area may reach 70 square kilometers (27 sq mi), sinking to 53 square kilometers (20 sq mi) during periods of drought. The mineralization of its waters is currently around 110 grams per liter (18 oz/imp gal). The lake bottom consists in silt with layers of mirabilite.

Lake Burlinskoye lies 24 kilometers (15 mi) to the NNW, Belenkoye 20 kilometers (12 mi) to the northeast, Maloye Yarovoye 31 kilometers (19 mi) to the northeast, Lake Kulunda 50 kilometers (31 mi) to the east, Bolshoye Topolnoye 53 kilometers (33 mi) to the NNW, and Bura 21 kilometers (13 mi) to the southwest, at the Russia-Kazakhstan border. Bolshoy Azhbulat lies in Kazakhstan, 77 kilometers (48 mi) to the northwest and Ulken Tobylzhan 71 kilometers (44 mi) to the WSW.

== See also ==
- List of lakes of Russia
