= Uspenka, Pavlodar Region =

Uspenka Успенка
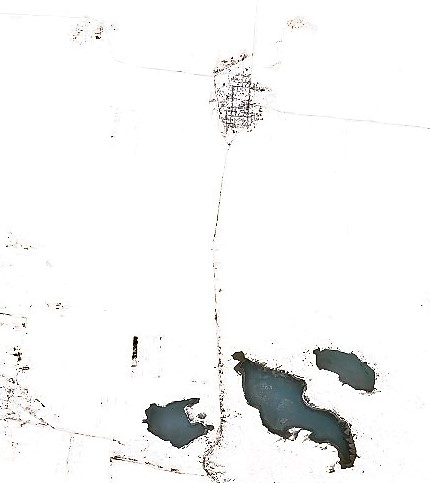
- Uspenka and Kishi Tobylzhan lake Sentinel-2 image

- Location in Kazakhstan
- Coordinates: 52°57′26″N 77°25′04″E
- Country: Kazakhstan
- Region: Pavlodar Region
- District: Uspen District
- Rural District: Uspen Rural District
- Established: 1909
- Elevation: 381 ft (116 m)

Population (2009)
  - Total: 4,067
- Time zone: UTC+6
- Postcode: 141000

Uspenka (Kazakh: Успенка) is a settlement in Pavlodar Region, Kazakhstan. It is the capital of Uspen District and the administrative center of the Uspen Rural District (KATO code — 556430100). Population: 4,067 (2009 census results); 5,160 (1999 census results).

== Geography ==
Uspenka lies in the Kulunda Plain, 10 kilometers (6.2 mi) to the north of lake Kishi Tobylzhan. The A17 Highway connects Uspenka and Pavlodar, the regional capital. Salt-mining town Tobylzhan lies 20 kilometers (12 mi) to the south.
