= Uspen District =

Coordinates: 52°55′48″N 77°21′00″E

Uspen Успен
- District
- Успен ауданы
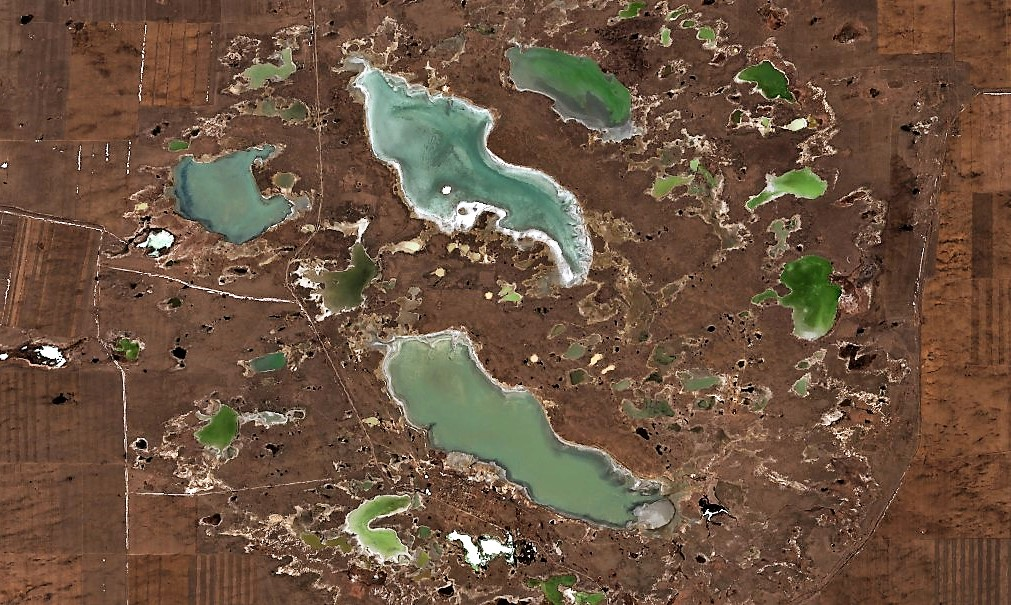
- Tobylzhan lake cluster Sentinel-2 image

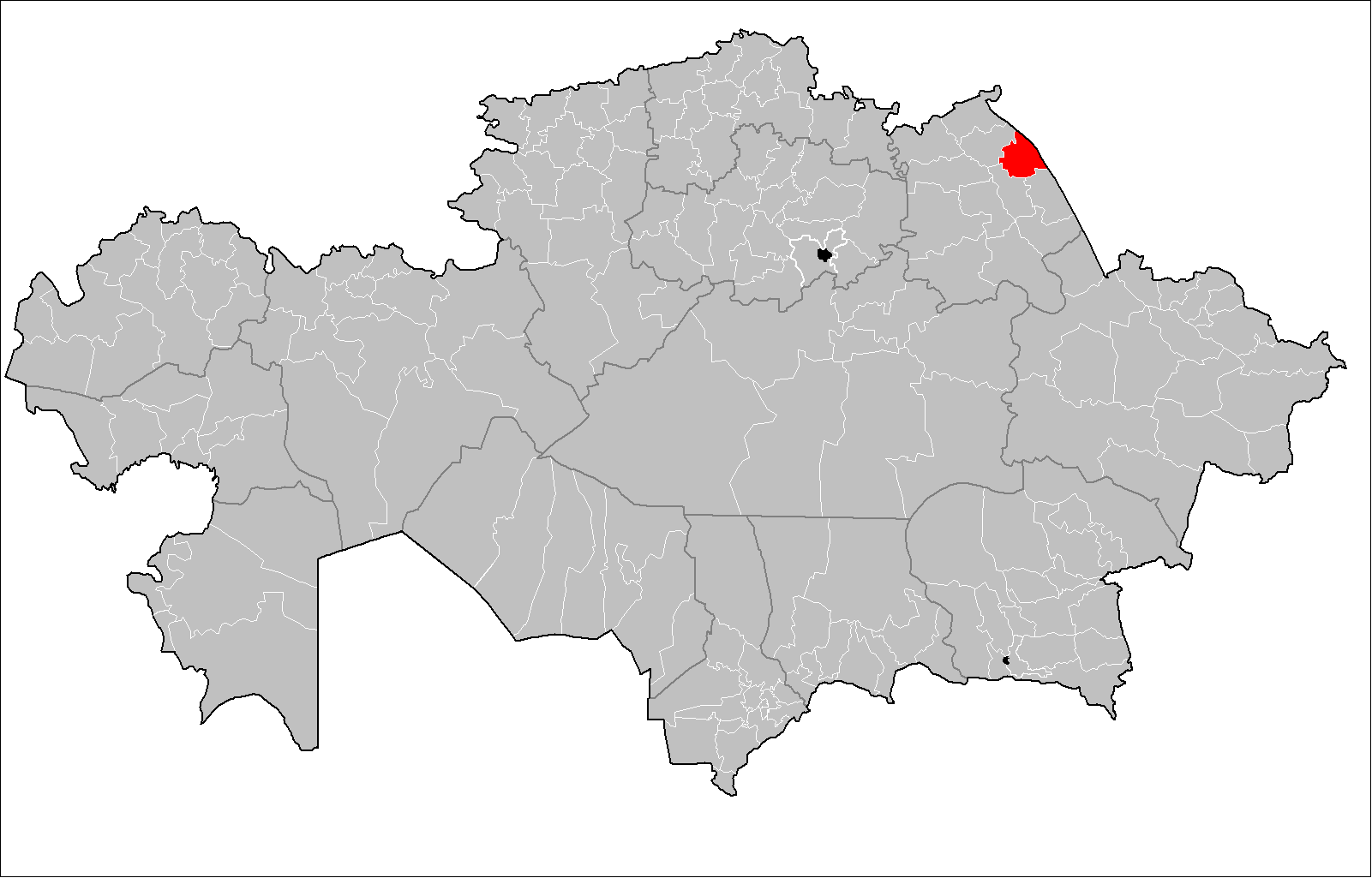
- Country: Kazakhstan
- Region: Pavlodar Region
- Administrative center: Uspenka
- Founded: 1935

Government
  - Akim: Nurbolat Makashev

Area
  - Total: 2,100 sq mi (5,500 km^{2})

Population (2013)
  - Total: 12,837
- Time zone: UTC+6 (East)

Uspen (Kazakh: Успен ауданы, Uspen audany) is a district of Pavlodar Region in northern Kazakhstan. The administrative center of the district is Uspenka. Many Kazakhstan Germans live in this area. Population: 12,837 (2013 estimate); 13,254 (2009 census results); 21,395 (1999 census results).

== Geography ==
Lake Ulken Azhbolat, a briny endorheic lake, is located in the district. The Burla river flows into the eastern lakeshore. Lake Chagan straddles the Kazakhstan–Russia border, and Ulken Tobylzhan lies further south.
