= Maloye Yarovoye =

Salt lake in Altai Krai, Russia

- Малое Яровое
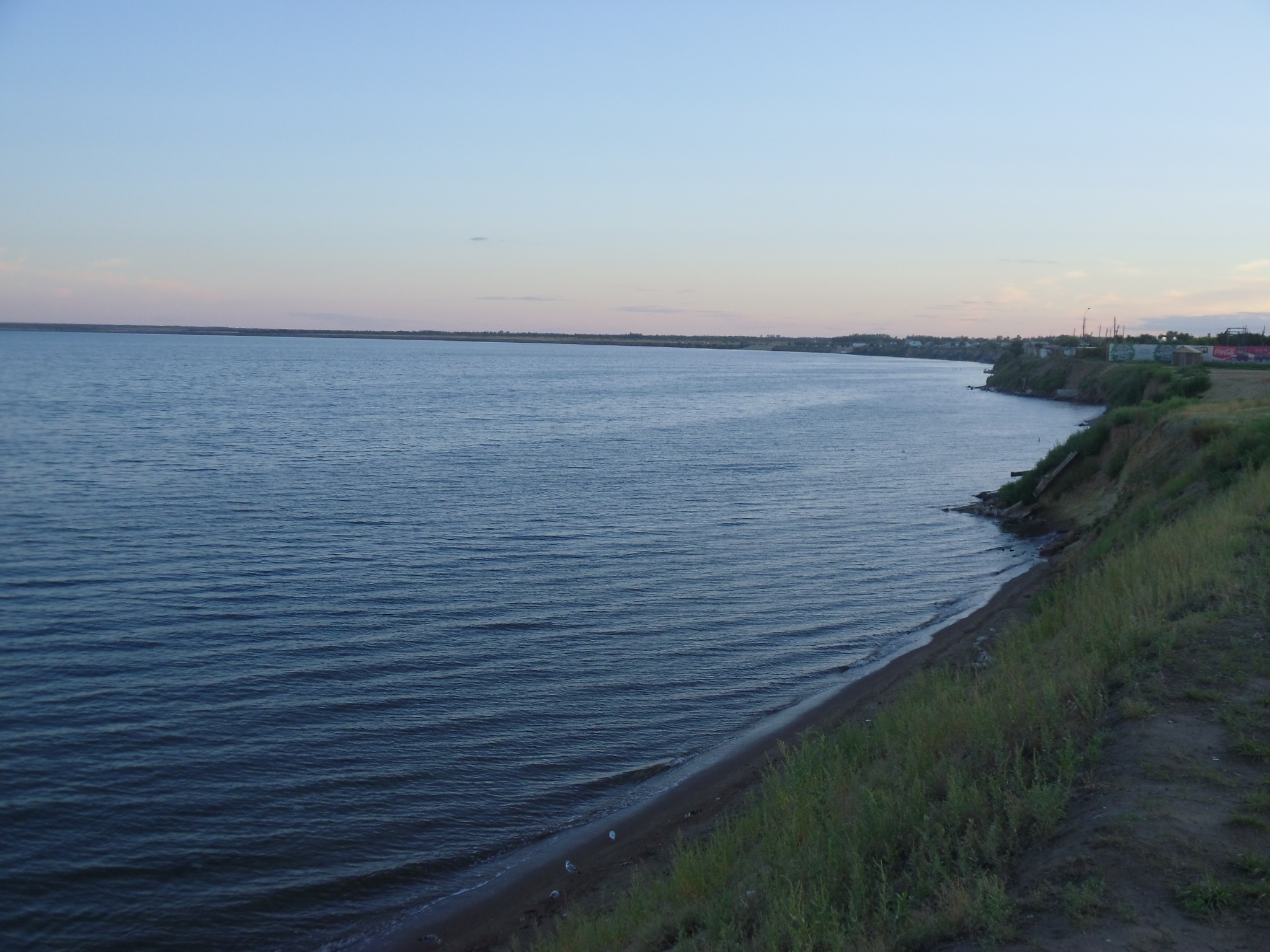
- Twilight panorama of the lakeshore

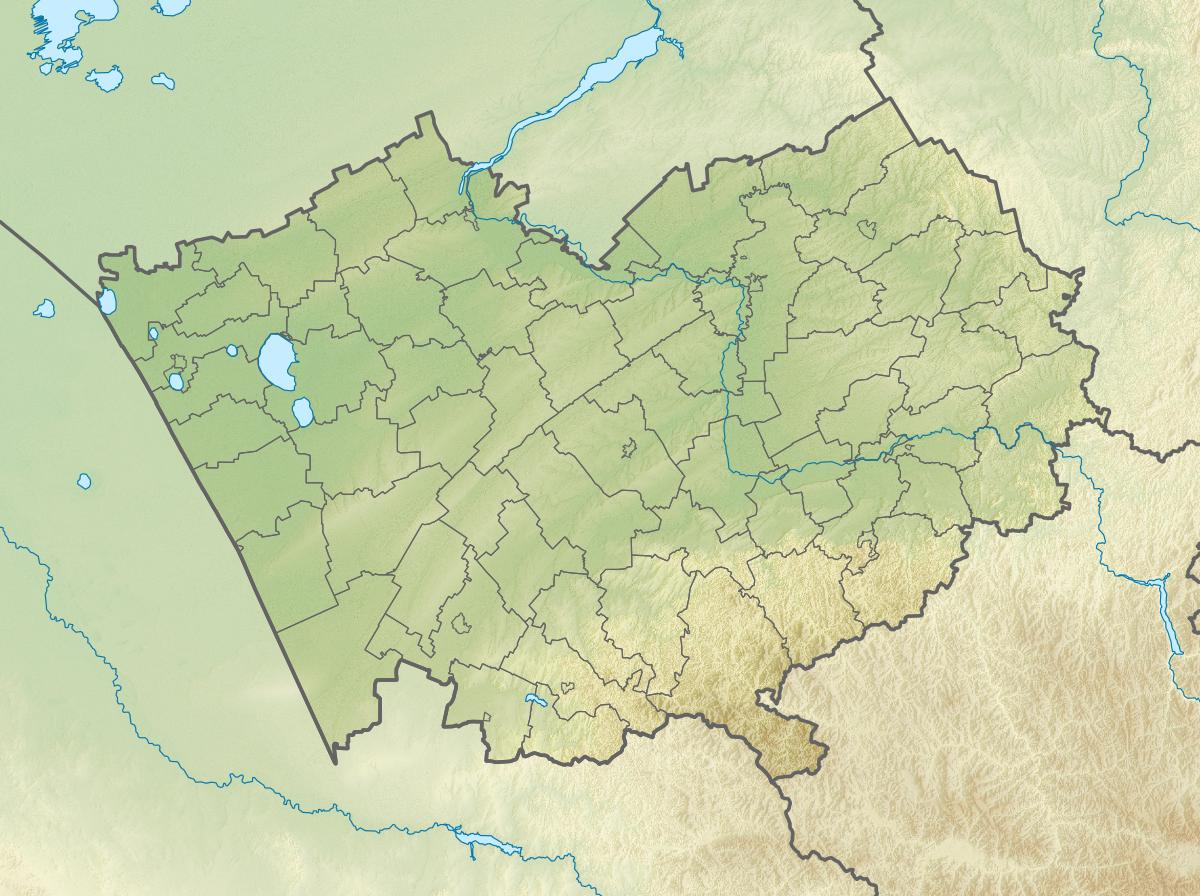
- Location within Altai Krai Location within Russia
- Location: Kulunda Plain; West Siberian Plain
- Coordinates: 53°02′31″N 79°07′44″E
- Type: endorheic
- Catchment area: 1,010 square kilometers (390 sq mi)
- Basin countries: Russia
- Max. length: 7.2 kilometers (4.5 mi)
- Max. width: 6.3 kilometers (3.9 mi)
- Surface area: 35.2 square kilometers (13.6 sq mi)
- Average depth: 2 meters (6 ft 7 in)
- Max. depth: 5 meters (16 ft)
- Residence time: UTC+6
- Surface elevation: 98 meters (322 ft)
- Islands: None

Maloye Yarovoye (Russian: Малое Яровое, lit. 'Little Yarovoye') is a salt lake in Slavgorod Municipality, Altai Krai, Russian Federation.

The lake is located in the northwestern part of the Krai. The nearest inhabited places are Vladimirovka and Semyonovka, located not far from the northwestern shore. Slavgorod lies 28 kilometers (17 mi) to the west. The lake is a protected area.

== Geography ==
Located in the Kulunda Plain, part of the West Siberian Plain, Maloye Yarovoye has a roughly circular shape with a diameter of about 7 kilometers (4.3 mi). The lakeshore is steep, sloping down from heights between 3 meters (9.8 ft) and 5 meters (16 ft). The water is saline and the lake bottom has layers of sand and silt.

Lake Kulunda lies 13 kilometers (8.1 mi) to the east, Belenkoye (Tabunsky District) 9 kilometers (5.6 mi) to the southeast, Belenkoye (Slavgorod Municipality) 8 kilometers (5.0 mi) to the east, Bolshoye Yarovoye 31 kilometers (19 mi) to the WSW and Burlinskoye 43 kilometers (27 mi) to the WNW.

== Flora and fauna ==
Maloye Yarovoye is surrounded by steppe vegetation. There are no fish in the lake, its only aquatic fauna is the small crustacean Artemia salina.

== See also ==
- List of lakes of Russia
