= Slavgorod =

Town in Altai Krai, Russia

Slavgorod Славгород
- Town
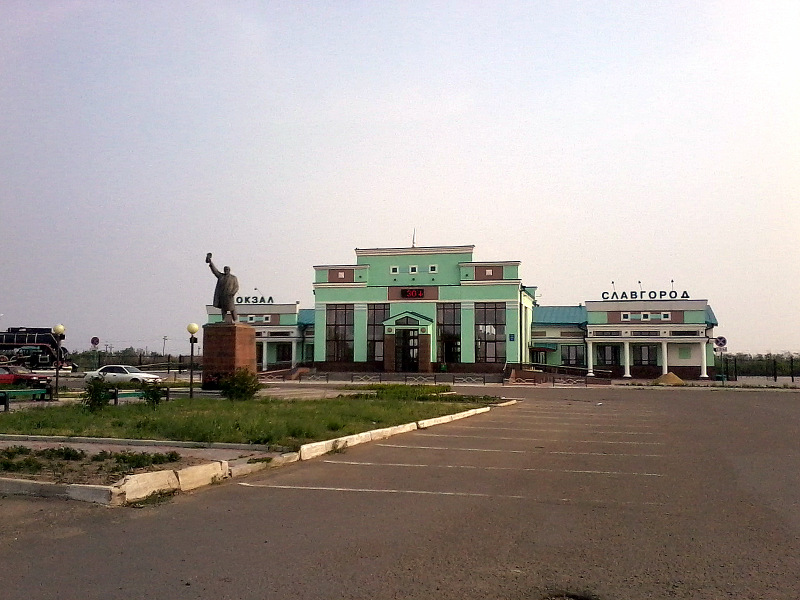
- Slavgorod railroad station

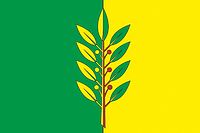
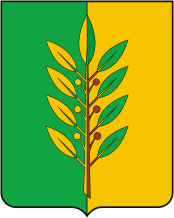
- Flag Coat of arms
- Interactive map of Slavgorod
- Location of Slavgorod Slavgorod (Altai Krai)
- Coordinates: 52°59′N 78°40′E
- Country: Russia
- Federal subject: Altai Krai
- Founded: 1910
- Town status since: 1914

Area
  - Total: 53.32 km^{2} (20.59 sq mi)
- Elevation: 115 m (377 ft)

Population (2010 Census)
  - Total: 32,389
  - Estimate (2025): 27,040 (−16.5%)
  - Density: 607.4/km^{2} (1,573/sq mi)

Administrative status
  - Subordinated to: town of krai significance of Slavgorod

Municipal status
  - Urban okrug: Slavgorod Urban Okrug
- Time zone: UTC+7 (MSK+4)
- Postal codes: 658820–658826, 658828–658830
- Dialing code: +7 38568
- OKTMO ID: 01719000001
- Website: www.slavgorod.ru

Slavgorod (Russian: Сла́вгород) is a town in Altai Krai, Russia, located between Lakes Sekachi and Bolshoye Yarovoye. The population of the town is 32,389 (2010 census).

It was founded in 1910 and was granted town status in 1914.

== Administrative and municipal status ==
Within the framework of administrative divisions, Slavgorod is, together with twenty-three rural localities, incorporated as the town of krai significance of Slavgorod—an administrative unit with a status equal to that of a district. As a municipal division, the town of krai significance of Slavgorod is incorporated as Slavgorod Urban Okrug.

Both administrative and municipal territories of Slavgorod were enlarged effective January 1, 2012, when the Slavgorodsky District was abolished.

== Geography ==
Lakes Burlinskoye, Bolshoye Yarovoye and Maloye Yarovoye are located in the district.

=== Climate ===
Slavgorod has cold semi-arid climate (Köppen climate classification BSk) with cold winters and hot summers. Summer temperatures in Slavgorod are one of the highest in whole Siberia. Annual precipitation is low throughout year with some maximum in summer.

Climate data for Slavgorod (extremes 1936-present)
Month	Jan	Feb	Mar	Apr	May	Jun	Jul	Aug	Sep	Oct	Nov	Dec	Year
Record high °C (°F)	3.6 (38.5)	3.9 (39.0)	21.5 (70.7)	33.2 (91.8)	38.3 (100.9)	40.2 (104.4)	40.7 (105.3)	39.5 (103.1)	35.8 (96.4)	27.1 (80.8)	14.8 (58.6)	6.2 (43.2)	40.7 (105.3)
Mean daily maximum °C (°F)	−12.5 (9.5)	−9.9 (14.2)	−2.0 (28.4)	13.0 (55.4)	21.6 (70.9)	26.7 (80.1)	27.8 (82.0)	26.0 (78.8)	19.0 (66.2)	10.2 (50.4)	−2.0 (28.4)	−9.2 (15.4)	9.1 (48.3)
Daily mean °C (°F)	−17.3 (0.9)	−15.1 (4.8)	−7.2 (19.0)	5.9 (42.6)	13.9 (57.0)	19.5 (67.1)	21.1 (70.0)	18.9 (66.0)	12.0 (53.6)	4.3 (39.7)	−6.3 (20.7)	−13.7 (7.3)	3.0 (37.4)
Mean daily minimum °C (°F)	−21.5 (−6.7)	−19.5 (−3.1)	−11.7 (10.9)	0.3 (32.5)	6.8 (44.2)	12.9 (55.2)	15.1 (59.2)	12.7 (54.9)	6.4 (43.5)	−0.1 (31.8)	−9.8 (14.4)	−17.9 (−0.2)	−2.2 (28.1)
Record low °C (°F)	−47.9 (−54.2)	−44.8 (−48.6)	−37.4 (−35.3)	−26.1 (−15.0)	−8.4 (16.9)	−1.8 (28.8)	4.6 (40.3)	−0.4 (31.3)	−8.5 (16.7)	−22.8 (−9.0)	−41.3 (−42.3)	−43.7 (−46.7)	−47.9 (−54.2)
Average precipitation mm (inches)	17 (0.7)	13 (0.5)	15 (0.6)	17 (0.7)	23 (0.9)	42 (1.7)	54 (2.1)	33 (1.3)	25 (1.0)	26 (1.0)	23 (0.9)	22 (0.9)	310 (12.3)
Source: pogoda.ru.net
