= Tabuny =

Settlement in Tabunsky Village Council, Tabunsky District, Altai Krai, Russia

Coordinates: 52°47′N 78°47′E

Tabuny (Russian: Табуны) is a rural locality (a selo) and the administrative center of Tabunsky District of Altai Krai, Russia. Population: 3,876 (2010 census); 3,836 (2002 census); 4,056 (1989 Soviet census).
