= Tabunsky District =

Tabunsky District Табунский район (Russian)
- District
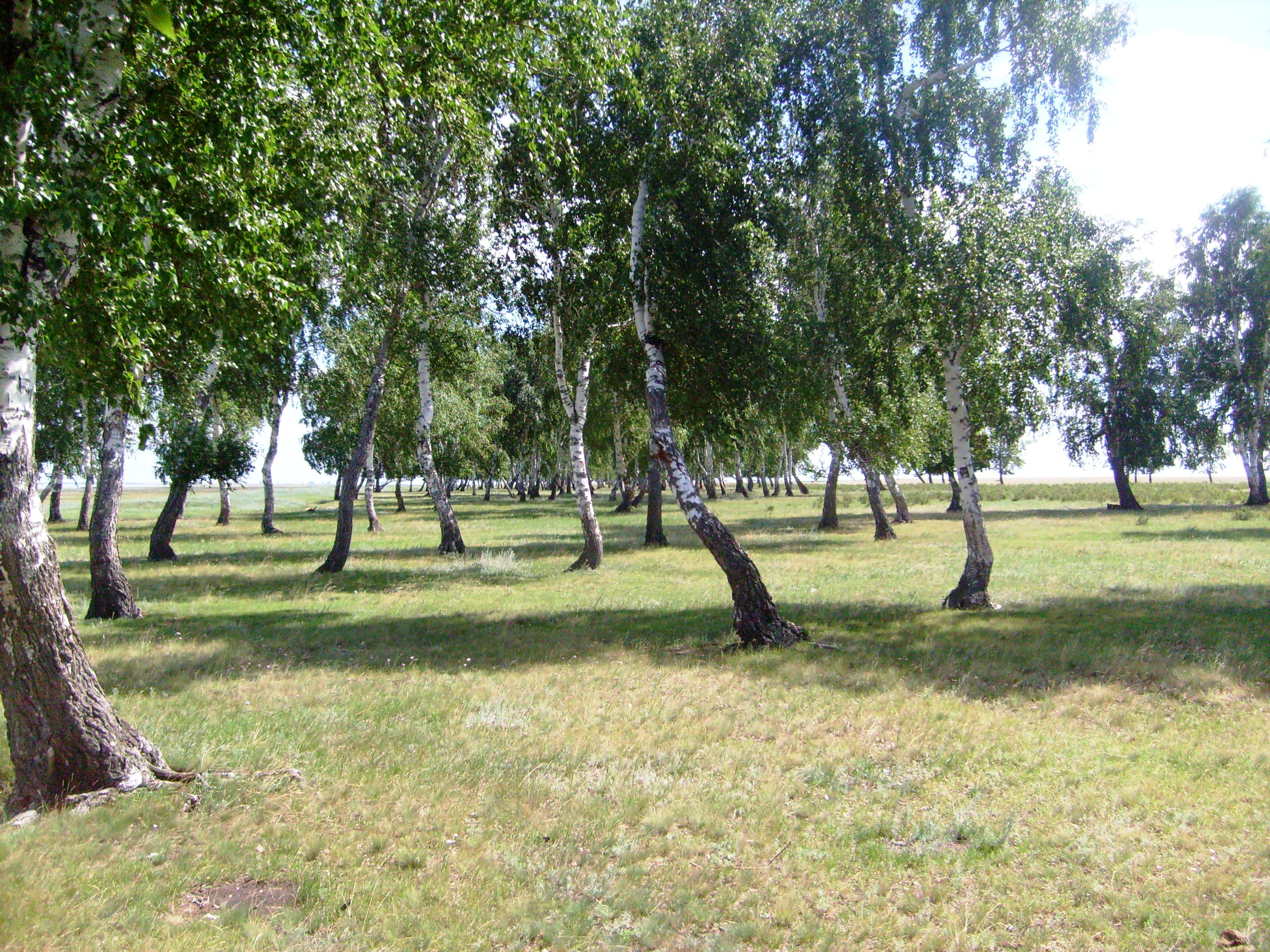
- Landscape in Tabunsky District

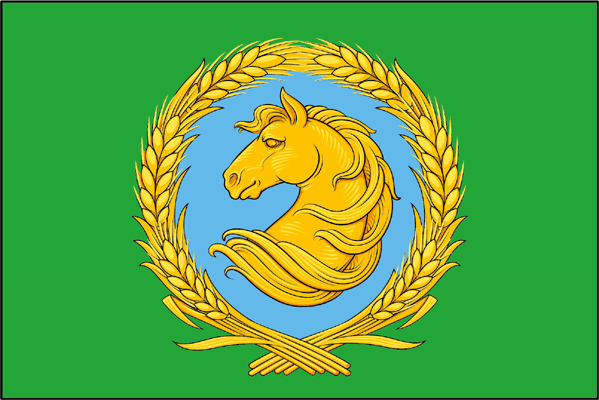
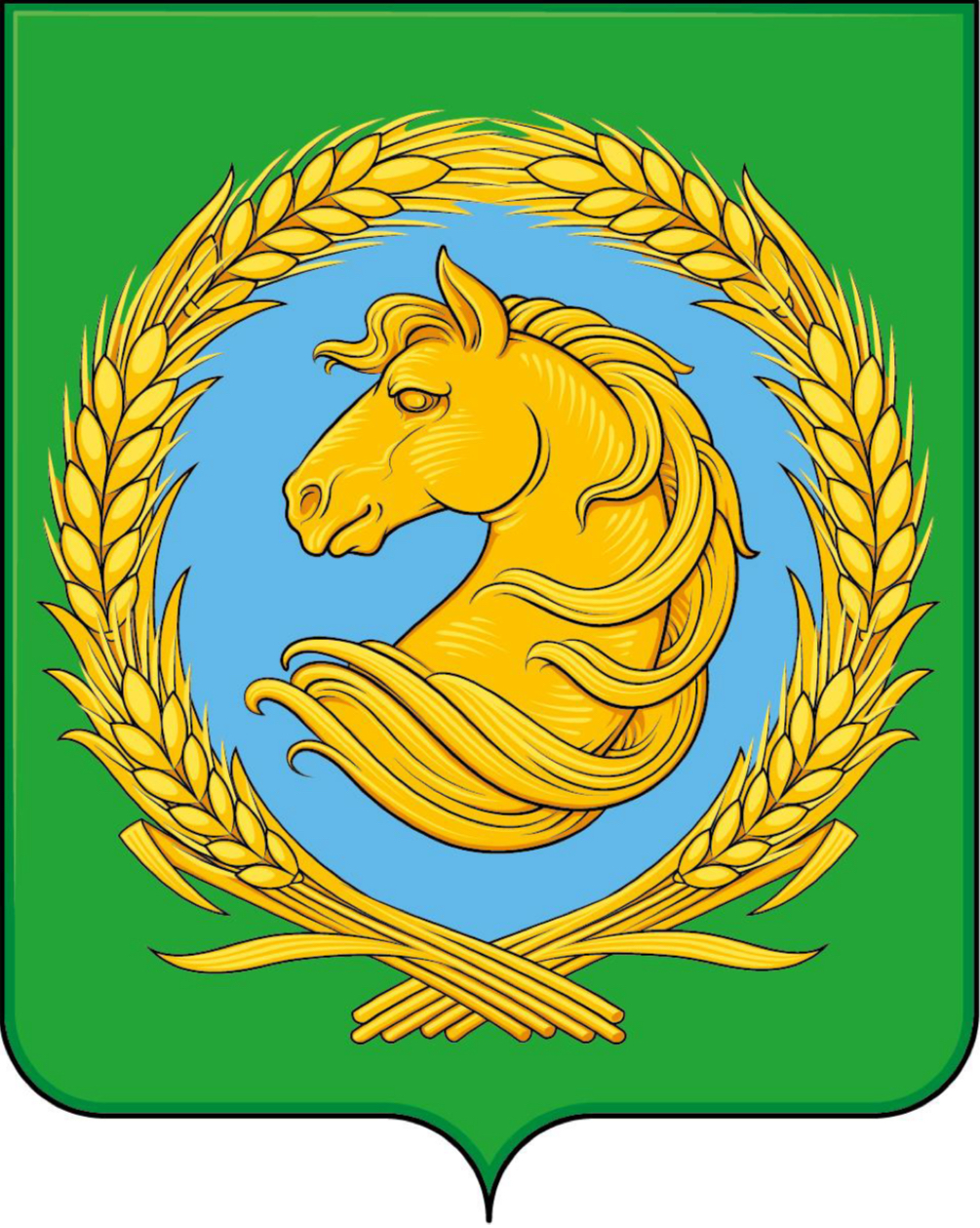
- Flag Coat of arms
- Location of Tabunsky District in Altai Krai
- Coordinates: 52°46′N 78°46′E
- Country: Russia
- Federal subject: Altai Krai
- Established: 1944
- Administrative center: Tabuny

Area
  - Total: 1,960 km^{2} (760 sq mi)

Population (2010 Census)
  - Total: 10,057
  - Density: 5.13/km^{2} (13.3/sq mi)
  - Urban: 0%
  - Rural: 100%

Administrative structure
  - Administrative divisions: 5 Selsoviets
  - Inhabited localities: 25 rural localities

Municipal structure
  - Municipally incorporated as: Tabunsky Municipal District
  - Municipal divisions: 0 urban settlements, 5 rural settlements
- Time zone: UTC+7 (MSK+4)
- OKTMO ID: 01646000
- Website: http://www.admtabrn.ru

Population of Tabunsky District
- 2010 Census: 10,057
- 2002 Census: 11,897
- 1989 Census: 13,418
- 1979 Census: 12,602

Tabunsky District (Russian: Табу́нский райо́н) is an administrative and municipal district (raion), one of the fifty-nine in Altai Krai, Russia. It is located in the northwest of the krai. The area of the district is 1,960 square kilometers (760 sq mi). Its administrative center is the rural locality (a selo) of Tabuny. As of the 2010 Census, the total population of the district was 10,057, with the population of Tabuny accounting for 38.5% of that number.
