= Tselinny (rural locality) =

Rural locality name

Tselinny (Russian: Цели́нный; masculine), Tselinnaya (Цели́нная; feminine), or Tselinnoye (Цели́нное; neuter) is the name of several rural localities in Russia.

== Altai Krai ==
As of 2010, four rural localities in Altai Krai bear this name:

- Tselinny, Khabarsky District, Altai Krai, a settlement in Korotoyaksky Selsoviet of Khabarsky District
- Tselinny, Klyuchevsky District, Altai Krai, a settlement in Novotselinny Selsoviet of Klyuchevsky District
- Tselinny, Kytmanovsky District, Altai Krai, a settlement in Oktyabrsky Selsoviet of Kytmanovsky District
- Tselinnoye, Altai Krai, a selo in Tselinny Selsoviet of Tselinny District

== Republic of Bashkortostan ==
As of 2010, two rural localities in the Republic of Bashkortostan bear this name:

- Tselinny, Republic of Bashkortostan, a selo in Almukhametovsky Selsoviet of Abzelilovsky District
- Tselinnoye, Republic of Bashkortostan, a selo in Tselinny Selsoviet of Khaybullinsky District

== Republic of Buryatia ==
As of 2010, one rural locality in the Republic of Buryatia bears this name:

- Tselinny, Republic of Buryatia, a settlement in Tselinny Selsoviet of Yeravninsky District

== Chelyabinsk Oblast ==
As of 2010, two rural localities in Chelyabinsk Oblast bear this name:

- Tselinny, Kizilsky District, Chelyabinsk Oblast, a settlement in Izmaylovsky Selsoviet of Kizilsky District
- Tselinny, Troitsky District, Chelyabinsk Oblast, a settlement in Kosobrodsky Selsoviet of Troitsky District

== Irkutsk Oblast ==
As of 2010, one rural locality in Irkutsk Oblast bears this name:

- Tselinny, Irkutsk Oblast, a settlement in Nukutsky District

== Jewish Autonomous Oblast ==
As of 2010, one rural locality in the Jewish Autonomous Oblast bears this name:

- Tselinnoye, Jewish Autonomous Oblast, a selo in Leninsky District

== Republic of Khakassia ==
As of 2010, one rural locality in the Republic of Khakassia bears this name:

- Tselinnoye, Republic of Khakassia, a selo in Tselinny Selsoviet of Shirinsky District

== Krasnodar Krai ==
As of 2010, one rural locality in Krasnodar Krai bears this name:

- Tselinny, Krasnodar Krai, a settlement in Tselinny Rural Okrug of Slavyansky District

== Kurgan Oblast ==
As of 2010, one rural locality in Kurgan Oblast bears this name:

- Tselinnoye, Kurgan Oblast, a selo in Tselinny Selsoviet of Tselinny District

== Novosibirsk Oblast ==
As of 2010, four rural localities in Novosibirsk Oblast bear this name:

- Tselinny, Iskitimsky District, Novosibirsk Oblast, a settlement in Iskitimsky District
- Tselinny (Sadovsky Rural Settlement), Krasnozyorsky District, Novosibirsk Oblast, a settlement in Krasnozyorsky District; municipally, a part of Sadovsky Rural Settlement of that district
- Tselinny (Maysky Rural Settlement), Krasnozyorsky District, Novosibirsk Oblast, a settlement in Krasnozyorsky District; municipally, a part of Maysky Rural Settlement of that district
- Tselinnoye, Novosibirsk Oblast, a selo in Kochenyovsky District

== Omsk Oblast ==
As of 2010, two rural localities in Omsk Oblast bear this name:

- Tselinnoye, Cherlaksky District, Omsk Oblast, a village in Krasnooktyabrsky Rural Okrug of Cherlaksky District
- Tselinnoye, Russko-Polyansky District, Omsk Oblast, a selo in Tselinny Rural Okrug of Russko-Polyansky District

== Orenburg Oblast ==
As of 2010, one rural locality in Orenburg Oblast bears this name:

- Tselinny, Orenburg Oblast, a settlement in Tselinny Selsoviet of Svetlinsky District

== Rostov Oblast ==
As of 2010, one rural locality in Rostov Oblast bears this name:

- Tselinny, Rostov Oblast, a khutor in Konzavodskoye Rural Settlement of Zernogradsky District

== Saratov Oblast ==
As of 2010, three rural localities in Saratov Oblast bear this name:

- Tselinny, Krasnopartizansky District, Saratov Oblast, a settlement in Krasnopartizansky District
- Tselinny, Perelyubsky District, Saratov Oblast, a settlement in Perelyubsky District
- Tselinny, Yershovsky District, Saratov Oblast, a settlement in Yershovsky District

== Stavropol Krai ==
As of 2010, one rural locality in Stavropol Krai bears this name:

- Tselinny, Stavropol Krai, a settlement in Iskrovsky Selsoviet of Budyonnovsky District

== Tuva Republic ==
As of 2010, one rural locality in the Tuva Republic bears this name:

- Tselinnoye, Tuva Republic, a selo in Tselinnoye Sumon (Rural Settlement) of Kyzylsky District

== Volgograd Oblast ==
As of 2010, one rural locality in Volgograd Oblast bears this name:

- Tselinny, Volgograd Oblast, a settlement in Sovkhozsky Selsoviet of Nikolayevsky District

== Zabaykalsky Krai ==
As of 2010, one rural locality in Zabaykalsky Krai bears this name:

- Tselinny, Zabaykalsky Krai, a settlement in Krasnokamensky District
