= Biysk constituency =

Russian legislative constituency

Biysk single-member constituency
- Constituency of the Russian State Duma
- Deputy: Ivan Loor; United Russia
- Federal subject: Altai Krai
- Districts: Barnaul (Leninsky, Oktyabrsky), Biysk, Biysky, Kosikhinsky, Krasnogorsky, Kytmanovsky, Novoaltaysk, Pervomaysky, ZATO Sibirsky, Soltonsky, Togulsky, Troitsky, Tselinny, Yeltsovsky, Zalesovsky, Zarinsk, Zarinsky, Zonalny
- Voters: 597,710 (2026)

The Biysk constituency (No.46 (Note: No.36 in 1993-1995, No.35 in 1995-2003, No.37 in 2003-2007, No.41 in 2016–2026)) is a Russian legislative constituency in Altai Krai. Currently the constituency covers western Altai Krai, including industrial cities of Biysk and Zarinsk as well as Leninsky and Oktyabrsky districts of Barnaul and its satellite city Novoaltaysk.

The constituency has been represented since 2026 by United Russia deputy Ivan Loor, three-term State Duma member, who was redistricted from Slavgorod constituency.

== Boundaries ==
1993–2007: Altaysky District, Biysk, Biysky District, Krasnogorsky District, Kytmanovsky District, Novoaltaysk, Pervomaysky District, ZATO Sibirsky, Soltonsky District, Sovetsky District, Talmensky District, Togulsky District, Tselinny District, Yeltsovsky District, Zalesovsky District, Zarinsk, Zarinsky District
The constituency covered eastern Altai Krai, stretching from Barnaul northern and eastern suburbs and the satellite city of Novoaltaysk south to industrial city of Biysk.

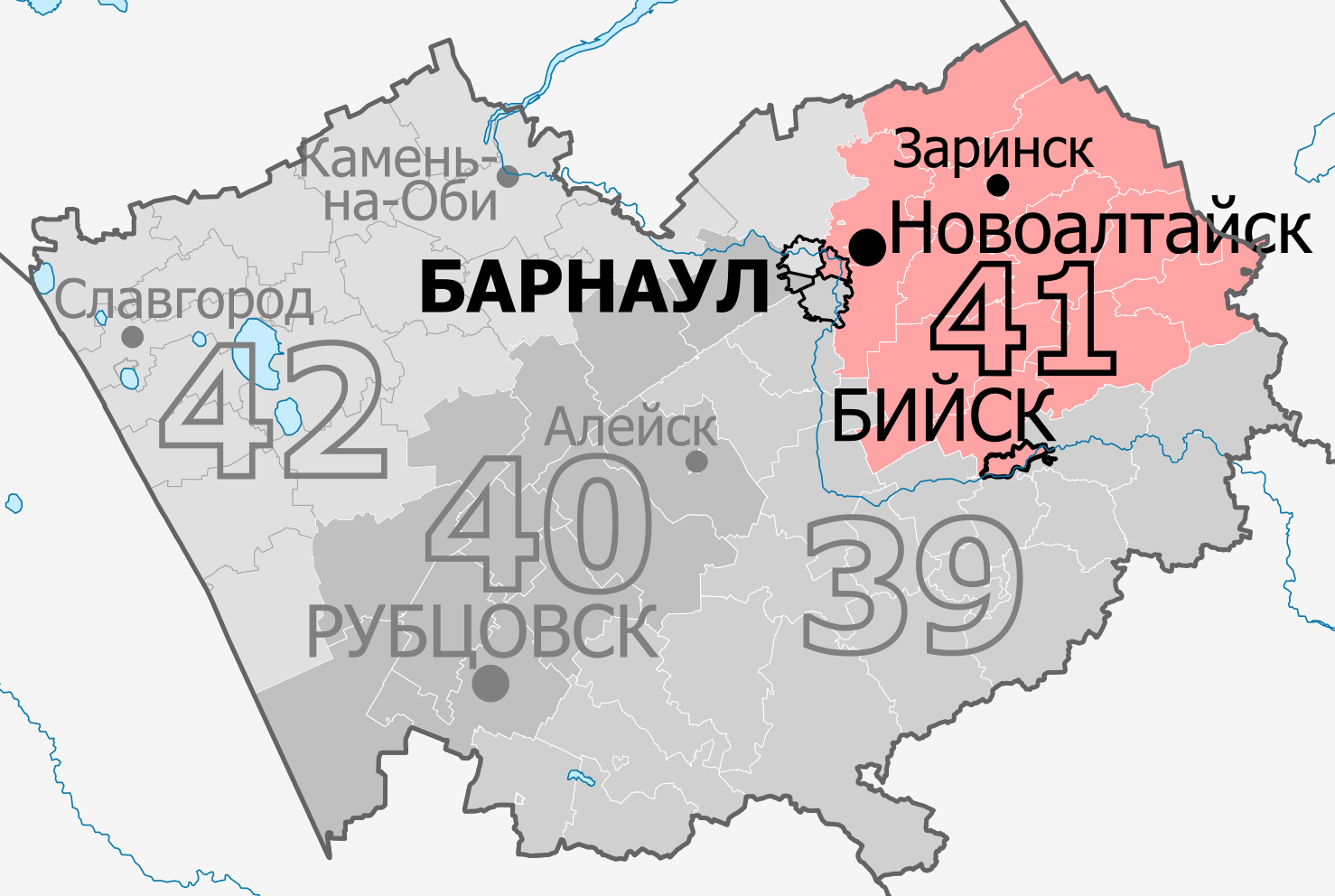
Constituency boundaries from 2016 to 2026

2016–2026: Barnaul (Oktyabrsky), Biysk, Kosikhinsky District, Kytmanovsky District, Novoaltaysk, Pervomaysky District, ZATO Sibirsky, Togulsky District, Troitsky District, Tselinny District, Yeltsovsky District, Zalesovsky District, Zarinsk, Zarinsky District, Zonalny District
The constituency was re-created for the 2016 election and in its new configuration it took Oktyabrsky District of Barnaul itself but shedded rural areas to the south of Biysk to Barnaul constituency.

2026–present: Barnaul (Leninsky, Oktyabrsky), Biysk, Biysky District, Kosikhinsky District, Krasnogorsky District, Kytmanovsky District, Novoaltaysk, Pervomaysky District, ZATO Sibirsky, Soltonsky District, Togulsky District, Troitsky District, Tselinny District, Yeltsovsky District, Zalesovsky District, Zarinsk, Zarinsky District, Zonalny District
After the 2025 redistricting Altai Krai lost one of its four constituencies, so all remaining seats saw major changes. The constituency retained all of its territory and gained rural districts to the south from Barnaul constituency as well as Leninsky city district of Barnaul from Slavgorod constituency.

== Members elected ==
Election	Member	Party
1993	Pavel Yefremov	Independent
1995	Zoya Vorontsova	Communist Party
1999	Zoya Vorontsova	Communist Party
2003	Lev Korshunov (Note: appointed acting Provost of the Altai State Technical University in August 2007)	Independent
2007	Proportional representation - no election by constituency	
2011	Proportional representation - no election by constituency	
2016	Aleksandr Prokopyev (Note: appointed Deputy Chairman of the Government of the Altai Republic in June 2024)	United Russia
2021	Aleksandr Prokopyev	United Russia
2026	Ivan Loor	United Russia

== Election results ==
=== 1993 ===
==== Declared candidates ====
- Vladimir Arguchinsky (Independent), agricultural union leader
- Pavel Yefremov (Independent), Deputy Governor of Altai Krai – Head of the Main Department of Agriculture (1991–present)

==== Results ====
Summary of the 12 December 1993 Russian legislative election in the Biysk constituency
Candidate	Party	Votes	%
Pavel Yefremov	Independent	94,859	37.21%
Vladimir Arguchinsky	Independent	–	–
Total		254,912	100%

=== 1995 ===
==== Declared candidates ====
- Mikhail Berulava (Independent), prorector of Biysk State Pedagogical Institute (1986–present)
- Vladimir Bobryshev (LNU), industrial executive
- Gennady Fokin (Independent), boiler plant director
- Vitaly Kiryanov (DVR–OD), agriculture executive
- Leonid Korniyetsky (Independent), deputy commander of the 35th Rocket Division (1991–present), RVSN colonel
- Vera Nasyrova (Duma-96), businesswoman
- Valery Oleshevich (Independent), chief of Tselinny District militsiya
- Valery Ostanin (Yabloko), industrial executive, retired militsiya colonel
- Valery Pyakin (LDPR), party official
- Nikolay Shabanov (Independent), Soviet–Afghan War veteran
- Zoya Vorontsova (CPRF), Member of Altaysky District Assembly of Representatives (1994–present), middle school principal
- Yury Zhiltsov (NDR), former People's Deputy of Russia (1990–1993), RAO UES executive

==== Declined ====
- Pavel Yefremov (APR), incumbent Member of State Duma (1994–present)

==== Results ====
Summary of the 17 December 1995 Russian legislative election in the Biysk constituency
Candidate	Party	Votes	%
Zoya Vorontsova	Communist Party	118,449	36.13%
Nikolay Shabanov	Independent	39,559	12.07%
Valery Pyakin	Liberal Democratic Party	26,492	8.08%
Valery Ostanin	Yabloko	24,113	7.36%
Valery Oleshevich	Independent	21,682	6.61%
Yury Zhiltsov	Our Home – Russia	21,036	6.42%
Mikhail Berulava	Independent	14,611	4.46%
Vitaly Kiryanov	Democratic Choice of Russia – United Democrats	13,829	4.22%
Leonid Korniyetsky	Independent	8,572	2.62%
Vadim Bobryshev	League of Independent Scientists	5,981	1.82%
Vera Nasyrova	Duma-96	3,484	1.06%
against all		23,661	7.22%
Total		327,799	100%

=== 1999 ===
==== Declared candidates ====
- Yury Bogdanov (Independent), Soviet–Afghan War veteran
- Viktor Chumakov (Russian Cause), cossack ataman
- Vyacheslav Guryev (LDPR), aide to State Duma member
- Andrey Mayevich (Independent), railway union leader
- Stanislav Odintsov (Independent), Altai-Koks executive
- Valery Ostanin (Yabloko), Member of Altai Krai Council of People's Deputies (1996–present), 1995 candidate for this seat
- Aleksandr Pankratov-Chyorny (Independent), actor, film producer
- Leonid Podanev (Independent), rural activist
- Vladimir Rayfikesht (Independent), former Governor of Altai Krai (1991–1994), former People's Deputy of Russia (1990–1993)
- Zoya Vorontsova (CPRF), incumbent Member of State Duma (1996–present)

==== Failed to qualify ====
- Aleksandr Khvostov (Independent), employment centre executive

==== Did not file ====
- Anna Cherdantseva (Independent), chairwoman of the Common Cause party regional office
- Maksim Kuzmenko (Independent)
- German Sterligov (Independent), businessman

==== Results ====
Summary of the 19 December 1999 Russian legislative election in the Biysk constituency
Candidate	Party	Votes	%
Zoya Vorontsova (incumbent)	Communist Party	100,090	31.05%
Valery Ostanin	Yabloko	50,138	15.55%
Stanislav Odintsov	Independent	41,501	12.88%
Yury Bogdanov	Independent	38,977	12.09%
Leonid Podanev	Independent	15,571	4.83%
Aleksandr Pankratov-Chyorny	Independent	15,140	4.70%
Andrey Mayevich	Independent	14,488	4.49%
Vladimir Rayfikesht	Independent	11,783	3.66%
Vyacheslav Guryev	Liberal Democratic Party	6,699	2.08%
Viktor Chumakov	Russian Cause	2,626	0.81%
against all		20,039	6.22%
Total		322,336	100%

=== 2003 ===
==== Declared candidates ====
- Lyudmila Golubeva (ORP Rus'), unemployed
- Vyacheslav Guryev (LDPR), former aide to State Duma member, 1999 candidate for this seat
- Sergey Khachaturyan (Rodina), former Member of Legislative Assembly of Altai Krai (1994–1994), railroad businessman
- Lev Korshunov (Independent), former Governor of Altai Krai (1994–1996), former People's Deputy of Russia (1990–1993)
- Valery Ostanin (Yabloko), Member of State Duma (2000–present), 1995 and 1999 candidate for this seat
- Iraida Parshutkina (Independent), chief doctor of the Biysk city hospital No.1
- Valery Safonov (SDPR), guesthouse director
- Yevgeny Skomorokhov (VR–ES), referent
- Sergey Tatlybayev (Independent), businessman
- Zoya Vorontsova (CPRF), incumbent Member of State Duma (1996–present)

==== Did not file ====
- Vladimir Bagrov (Independent), businessman
- Sergey Galkin (KPE), businessman
- Vladimir Mukhamedov (NPS RF), lawyer
- Vladimir Ponomarev (Independent), security executive
- Valery Popov (RPP-PSS), corporate executive

==== Results ====
Summary of the 7 December 2003 Russian legislative election in the Biysk constituency
Candidate	Party	Votes	%
Lev Korshunov	Independent	97,622	33.27%
Zoya Vorontsova (incumbent)	Communist Party	61,856	21.08%
Sergey Khachaturyan	Rodina	43,411	14.80%
Valery Ostanin	Yabloko	29,066	9.91%
Vyacheslav Guryev	Liberal Democratic Party	10,329	3.52%
Iraida Parshutkina	Independent	7,393	2.52%
Yevgeny Skomorokhov	Great Russia – Eurasian Union	5,397	1.84%
Lyudmila Golubeva	United Russian Party Rus'	3,939	1.34%
Sergey Tatlybayev	Independent	2,111	0.72%
Valery Safonov	Social Democratic Party	1,862	0.63%
against all		26,230	8.94%
Total		293,659	100%

=== 2016 ===
==== Declared candidates ====
- Tatyana Astafyeva (CPCR), pensioner
- Vladimir Mikhaylyuk (Party of Growth), businessman
- Konstantin Mironenko (The Greens), businessman
- Marina Osipova (A Just Russia), Member of Biysky District Council of People's Deputies (2012–present), retired Russian and literature teacher
- Aleksandr Prokopyev (United Russia), Member of State Duma (2011–present)
- Maria Prusakova (CPRF), first secretary of the party regional committee
- Pavel Rego (LDPR), Member of Biysk Duma (2012–present), engineer
- Sergey Ubrayev (Rodina), Member of Altai Krai Legislative Assembly (2011–present), businessman
- Konstantin Yemeshin (Yabloko), former Member of Altai Krai Council of People's Deputies (1990–1994), community activist

==== Failed to qualify ====
- Denis Guselnikov (PVO), businessman, perennial candidate

==== Did not file ====
- Aleksandr Gagalchiy (Independent), businessman

==== Results ====
Summary of the 18 September 2016 Russian legislative election in the Biysk constituency
Candidate	Party	Votes	%
Aleksandr Prokopyev	United Russia	68,360	36.55%
Maria Prusakova	Communist Party	26,696	14.27%
Marina Osipova	A Just Russia	26,607	14.22%
Pavel Rego	Liberal Democratic Party	26,161	13.99%
Tatyana Astafyeva	Communists of Russia	14,735	7.88%
Konstantin Yemeshin	Yabloko	5,388	2.88%
Konstantin Mironenko	The Greens	4,188	2.24%
Vladimir Mikhaylyuk	Party of Growth	3,534	1.89%
Sergey Ubrayev	Rodina	2,549	1.36%
Total		187,050	100%

=== 2021 ===
==== Declared candidates ====
- Anton Artsibashev (CPRF), party secretary
- Oleg Boronin (SR–ZP), Mayor of Sibirsky (2012–present), 2014 gubernatorial candidate
- Yury Ilyinykh (Yabloko), businessman
- Ksenia Kireyeva (New People), nonprofit executive
- Ivan Makarov (RPPSS), businessman
- Sergey Matasov (CPCR), first secretary of the party regional committee, perennial candidate
- Aleksandr Prokopyev (United Russia), incumbent Member of State Duma (2011–present)
- Maksim Zheleznovsky (LDPR), individual entrepreneur

==== Results ====
Summary of the 17-19 September 2021 Russian legislative election in the Biysk constituency
Candidate	Party	Votes	%
Aleksandr Prokopyev (incumbent)	United Russia	55,377	31.41%
Anton Artsibashev	Communist Party	43,132	24.46%
Oleg Boronin	A Just Russia — For Truth	21,456	12.17%
Ksenia Kireyeva	New People	13,561	7.69%
Maksim Zheleznovsky	Liberal Democratic Party	12,870	7.30%
Ivan Makarov	Party of Pensioners	9,096	5.16%
Sergey Matasov	Communists of Russia	8,294	4.70%
Yury Ilyinykh	Yabloko	3,835	2.18%
Total		176,307	100%

=== 2026 ===
==== Declared candidates ====
- Anton Artsibashev (CPRF), Member of Altai Krai Legislative Assembly (2021–present), 2021 candidate for this seat
- Anna Galitskaya (New People), Member of Barnaul City Duma (2022–present), sports club owner
- Pavel Kalashnik (Yabloko), political activist
- Ivan Loor (United Russia), incumbent Member of State Duma (2016–present) (Note: redistricted from Slavgorod constituency)
- Vladimir Semyonov (LDPR), Member of Altai Krai Legislative Assembly (2004–2007, 2016–present), former Member of State Duma (2007–2016), 2018 gubernatorial candidate
- Alexander Terentyev (A Just Russia), Member of State Duma (2007–present)
- Lyudmila Tsivilyova (CPCR), Member of Altai Krai Legislative Assembly (2021–present), accounting associate professor

==== Results ====
Summary of the 18-20 September 2026 Russian legislative election in the Biysk constituency
Candidate	Party	Votes	%
Ivan Loor (incumbent)	United Russia	93,332	37.31%
Anton Artsibashev	Communist Party	45,056	18.01%
Anna Galitskaya	New People	29,939	11.97%
Alexander Terentyev	A Just Russia	21,867	8.74%
Vladimir Semyonov	Liberal Democratic Party	21,864	8.74%
Lyudmila Tsivilyova	Communists of Russia	16,712	6.68%
Pavel Kalashnik	Yabloko	14,225	5.63%
Total		250,180	100%
