= Novikovo =

Novikovo (Russian: Новиково) is the name of several rural localities in Russia:

- Novikovo, Altai Krai, a selo in Novikovsky Selsoviet of Biysky District of Altai Krai; 52°37′N 85°58′E
- Novikovo, Arkhangelsk Oblast, a village in Kharitonovsky Selsoviet of Kotlassky District of Arkhangelsk Oblast
- Novikovo, Belgorod Oblast, a selo in Starooskolsky District of Belgorod Oblast
- Novikovo, Kostroma Oblast, a village in Orekhovskoye Settlement of Galichsky District of Kostroma Oblast
- Novikovo, Leningrad Oblast, a village in Klimovskoye Settlement Municipal Formation of Boksitogorsky District of Leningrad Oblast
- Novikovo, Lipetsk Oblast, a village in Ognevsky Selsoviet of Stanovlyansky District of Lipetsk Oblast
- Novikovo, Moscow, a village in Novofedorovskoye Settlement of Troitsky Administrative Okrug of the federal city of Moscow
- Novikovo, Klinsky District, Moscow Oblast, a village in Petrovskoye Rural Settlement of Klinsky District of Moscow Oblast
- Novikovo, Shemetovskoye Rural Settlement, Sergiyevo-Posadsky District, Moscow Oblast, a village in Shemetovskoye Rural Settlement of Sergiyevo-Posadsky District of Moscow Oblast
- Novikovo, Shemetovskoye Rural Settlement, Sergiyevo-Posadsky District, Moscow Oblast, a village in Shemetovskoye Rural Settlement of Sergiyevo-Posadsky District of Moscow Oblast
- Novikovo, Shakhovskoy District, Moscow Oblast, a village in Stepankovskoye Rural Settlement of Shakhovskoy District of Moscow Oblast
- Novikovo, Pytalovsky District, Pskov Oblast, a village in Pytalovsky District of Pskov Oblast
- Novikovo, Sebezhsky District, Pskov Oblast, a village in Sebezhsky District of Pskov Oblast
- Novikovo, Ryazan Oblast, a village under the administrative jurisdiction of the town of oblast significance of Skopin in Ryazan Oblast
- Novikovo, Sakhalin Oblast, a selo in Korsakovsky District of Sakhalin Oblast
- Novikovo, Smolensk Oblast, a village in Kikinskoye Rural Settlement of Tyomkinsky District of Smolensk Oblast
- Novikovo, Rasskazovsky District, Tambov Oblast, a settlement in Sayukinsky Selsoviet of Rasskazovsky District of Tambov Oblast
- Novikovo, Staroyuryevsky District, Tambov Oblast, a selo in Novikovsky Selsoviet of Staroyuryevsky District of Tambov Oblast
- Novikovo, Tomsk Oblast, a village in Parabelsky District of Tomsk Oblast
- Novikovo, Bezhetsky District, Tver Oblast, a village in Laptikhinskoye Rural Settlement of Bezhetsky District of Tver Oblast
- Novikovo, Rameshkovsky District, Tver Oblast, a village in Zastolbye Rural Settlement of Rameshkovsky District of Tver Oblast
