= Verkh-Shubinka =

Verkh-Shubinka Верх-Шубинка
- Selo
- Location within Altai Krai Location within Russia
- Coordinates: 52°56′N 85°18′E
- Country: Russia
- Region: Altai Krai
- District: Tselinny District
- Time zone: UTC+7:00

Verkh-Shubinka (Russian: Верх-Шубинка) is a rural locality (a selo) in Marushinsky Selsoviet, Tselinny District, Altai Krai, Russia. The population was 77 as of 2013. There are 9 streets.

== Geography ==
Verkh-Shubinka is located 51 km southwest of Tselinnoye (the district's administrative centre) by road. Marushka is the nearest rural locality.
