= Obraztsovka =

Obraztsovka Образцовка
- Settlement
- Location within Altai Krai Location within Russia
- Coordinates: 52°22′N 85°47′E
- Country: Russia
- Region: Altai Krai
- District: Biysky District
- Time zone: UTC+7:00

Obraztsovka (Russian: Образцовка) is a rural locality (a settlement) in Srostinsky Selsoviet, Biysky District, Altai Krai, Russia. The population was 147 as of 2013. There are 3 streets.

== Geography ==
Obraztsovka is located 45 km southeast of Biysk (the district's administrative centre) by road. Beryozovka is the nearest rural locality.
