= Marushka =

Marushka Марушка
- Selo
- Location within Altai Krai Location within Russia
- Coordinates: 52°52′N 85°29′E
- Country: Russia
- Region: Altai Krai
- District: Tselinny District
- Time zone: UTC+7:00

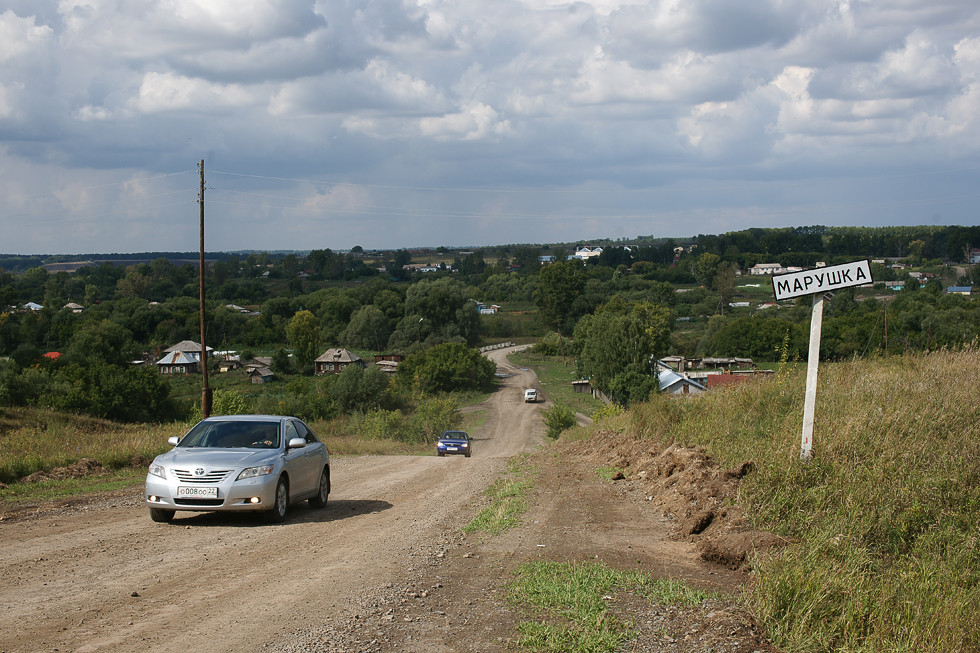
Marushka

Marushka (Russian: Марушка) is a rural locality (a selo) and the administrative center of Marushinsky Selsoviet, Tselinny District, Altai Krai, Russia. The population was 1,059 as of 2013. It was founded in 1777. There are 19 streets.

== Geography ==
Marushka is located 36 km south of Tselinnoye (the district's administrative centre) by road. Druzhba is the nearest rural locality.
