= Verkh-Bekhtemir =

Verkh-Bekhtemir Верх-Бехтемир
- Village
- Location within Altai Krai Location within Russia
- Coordinates: 52°45′N 85°54′E
- Country: Russia
- Region: Altai Krai
- District: Biysky District
- Time zone: UTC+7:00

Verkh-Bekhtemir (Russian: Верх-Бехтемир) is a rural locality (a selo) and the administrative center of Verkh-Bekhtemirsky Selsoviet of Biysky District, Altai Krai, Russia. The population was 979 as of 2016. There are 11 streets.

== Geography ==
Verkh-Bekhtemir is located on the bank of the Bekhtemir River, 60 km northeast of Biysk (the district's administrative centre) by road. Shebalino is the nearest rural locality.

== Ethnicity ==
The village is inhabited by Russians and others.
