= Alexander Prokopyev =

Russian politician

- Александр Прокопьев
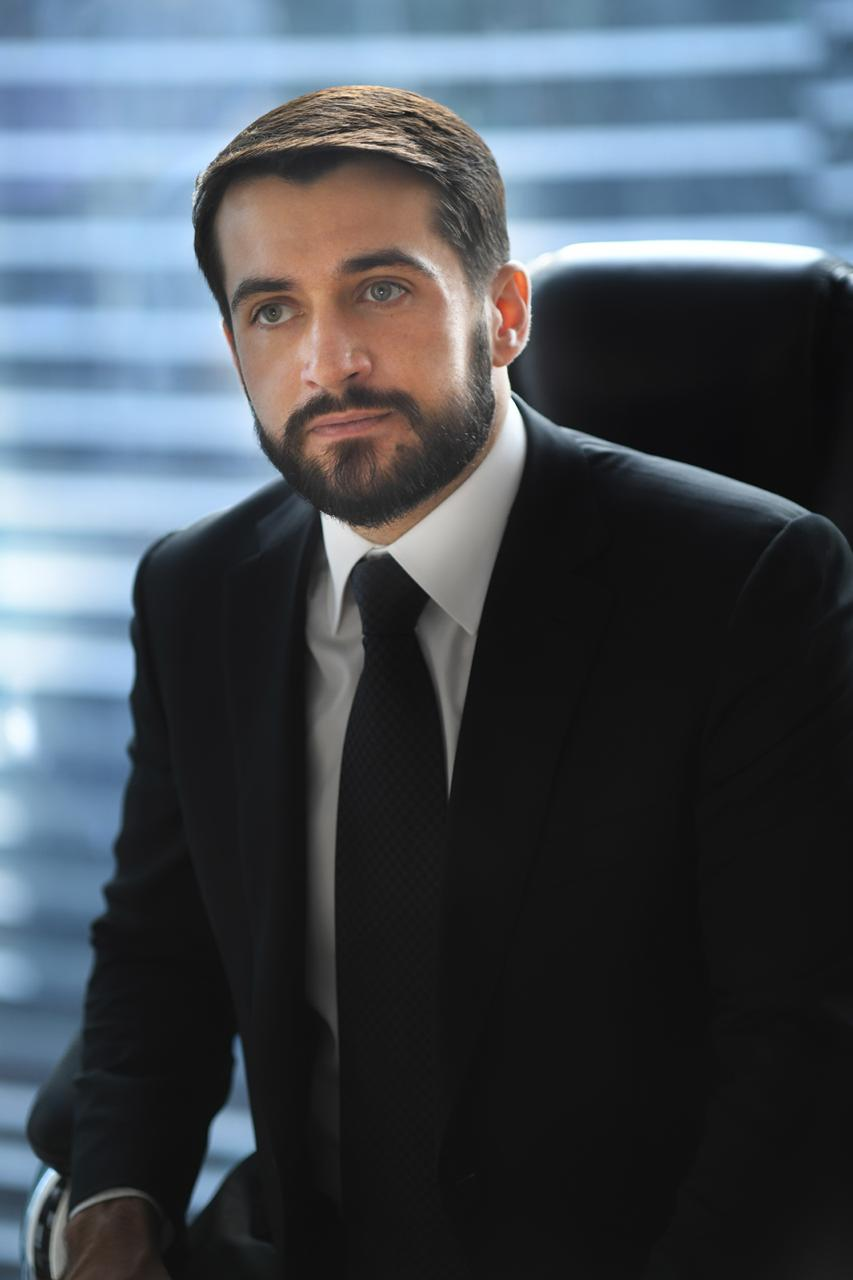

Member of the State Duma for Altai Krai
- Incumbent
- Assumed office 5 October 2016
- Preceded by: Constituency Re-established
- Constituency: Biysk (No. 41)

Member of the State Duma (Party List Seat)
- In office 21 December 2011 – 5 October 2016

Personal details
- Born: 5 August 1986 (age 40) Biysk, Altai Krai, Russian SFSR, USSR
- Party: United Russia
- Parent: Larisa Prokopyeva
- Education: First Moscow State Medical University; RANEPA (MBA)
- Occupation: Politician; Industrialist; Pharmacist

Alexander Sergeyevich Prokopyev (Russian: Александр Сергеевич Прокопьев; born August 5, 1986, in Biysk) is a Russian politician and a deputy of the 6th, 7th, and 8th State Dumas.

Prokopyev's mother, Larisa Prokopyeva, is a Russian entrepreneur and the founder of the Evalar company specializing in dietary supplements. After graduating from the First Moscow State Medical University, Alexander started working at the Evalar. In 2008-2011, he was responsible for the strategic development of the company. In 2011, he was elected deputy of the 6th State Duma from the Altai Krai constituency. In 2016 and 2021, Prokopyev was re-elected for the 7th and 8th State Dumas.

In 2012, Forbes ranked Prokopyev 37th out of 100 wealthiest civil servants in Russia. In 2017 and 2020, he became the richest of all Siberian deputies in the State Duma with an annual income of 92-108 mln rubles.

== Sanctions ==
Prokopyev was sanctioned by the UK government in 2022 in relation to the Russo-Ukrainian War.
