= Tselinny District, Russia =

Location of Altai Krai in Russia

Location of the Republic of Kalmykia in Russia

Location of Kurgan Oblast in Russia

Tselinny District is the name of several administrative and municipal districts in Russia. The name is generally derived from, or is related to, the root "tselina" ("virgin lands").

- Tselinny District, Altai Krai, an administrative and municipal district of Altai Krai
- Tselinny District, Republic of Kalmykia, an administrative and municipal district of the Republic of Kalmykia
- Tselinny District, Kurgan Oblast, an administrative and municipal district of Kurgan Oblast

== See also ==
- Tselinny (disambiguation)
