= Svetloozyorskoye =

Svetloozyorskoye Светлоозёрское
- Selo
- Location within Altai Krai Location within Russia
- Coordinates: 52°31′N 85°31′E
- Country: Russia
- Region: Altai Krai
- District: Biysky District
- Time zone: UTC+7:00

Svetloozyorskoye (Russian: Светлоозёрское) is a rural locality (a selo) and the administrative center of Svetloozyorsky Selsoviet, Biysky District, Altai Krai, Russia. The population was 1,141 as of 2013. There are 18 streets.

== Geography ==
Svetloozyorskoye is located 30 km east of Biysk (the district's administrative centre) by road. Maloyeniseyskoye is the nearest rural locality.
