= Yasnaya Polyana, Biysky District, Altai Krai =

Yasnaya Polyana Ясная Поляна
- Settlement
- Location within Altai Krai Location within Russia
- Coordinates: 52°40′N 85°25′E
- Country: Russia
- Region: Altai Krai
- District: Biysky District
- Time zone: UTC+7:00

Yasnaya Polyana (Russian: Ясная Поляна) is a rural locality (a settlement) in Pevomaysky Selsoviet, Biysky District, Altai Krai, Russia. The population was 374 as of 2013. There are 4 streets.

== Geography ==
Yasnaya Polyana is located 25 km northeast of Biysk (the district's administrative centre) by road. Beryozovaya Gorka is the nearest rural locality.
