= Pervomayskoye, Biysky District, Altai Krai =

Pevomayskoye Первомайское
- Selo
- Location within Altai Krai Location within Russia
- Coordinates: 52°35′N 85°15′E
- Country: Russia
- Region: Altai Krai
- District: Biysky District
- Time zone: UTC+7:00

Pevomayskoye (Russian: Первомайское) is a rural locality (a selo) and the administrative center of Pevomaysky Selsoviet, Biysky District, Altai Krai, Russia. The population was 5,454 as of 2013. There are 44 streets.

== Geography ==
Pevomayskoye is located 9 km north of Biysk (the district's administrative centre) by road. Prigorodny is the nearest rural locality.
