= Tselinny =

Tselinny (masculine), Tselinnaya (feminine), or Tselinnoye (neuter) may refer to:

- Tselinny District (disambiguation), name of several districts in the countries of the former Soviet Union
- Tselinny (rural locality), name of several rural localities in Russia
