= Yeniseyskoye =

Yeniseyskoye Енисейское
- Village
- Location within Altai Krai Location within Russia
- Coordinates: 52°34′N 85°30′E
- Country: Russia
- Region: Altai Krai
- District: Biysky District
- Time zone: UTC+7:00

Yeniseyskoye (Russian: Енисейское) is a rural locality (a selo) and the administrative center of Yeniseysky Selsoviet, Biysky District, Altai Krai, Russia. The population was 1,457 as of 2016. There are 24 streets.

== Geography ==
Yeniseyskoye is located on the Biya River, 27 km east of Biysk (the district's administrative centre) by road. Maloyeniseyskoye is the nearest rural locality.
