= Yeniseysky =

Yeniseysky (masculine), Yeniseyskaya (feminine), or Yeniseyskoye (neuter) may refer to:

- Yeniseysky District, a district of Krasnoyarsk Krai, Russia
- Yeniseysk Governorate (Yeniseyskaya guberniya; 1822–1925), an administrative division of the Russian Empire and the Russian SFSR
- Yeniseyskoye, a rural locality (a selo) in Altai Krai, Russia
