= Novikovo, Altai Krai =

Novikovo Новиково
- Selo
- Location within Altai Krai Location within Russia
- Coordinates: 52°36′N 85°57′E
- Country: Russia
- Region: Altai Krai
- District: Biysky District
- Time zone: UTC+7:00

Novikovo (Russian: Новиково) is a rural locality (a selo) and the administrative center of Novikovsky Selsoviet, Biysky District, Altai Krai, Russia. The population was 1,157 as of 2013. There are 22 streets.

== Geography ==
Novikovo is located 59 km east of Biysk (the district's administrative centre) by road. Souskanikha is the nearest rural locality.
