= Chuysky =

Chuysky Чуйский
- Settlement
- Location within Altai Krai Location within Russia
- Coordinates: 52°26′N 85°29′E
- Country: Russia
- Region: Altai Krai
- District: Biysky District
- Time zone: UTC+7:00

Chuysky (Russian: Чуйский) is a rural locality (a settlement) in Biysky District, Altai Krai, Russia. The population was 379 as of 2013. There are 9 streets.

== Geography ==
Chuysky is located 22 km southeast of Biysk (the district's administrative centre) by road. Verkh-Katunskoye is the nearest rural locality.
