= Biysk Airport =

Biysk Airport Аэропорт Бийск
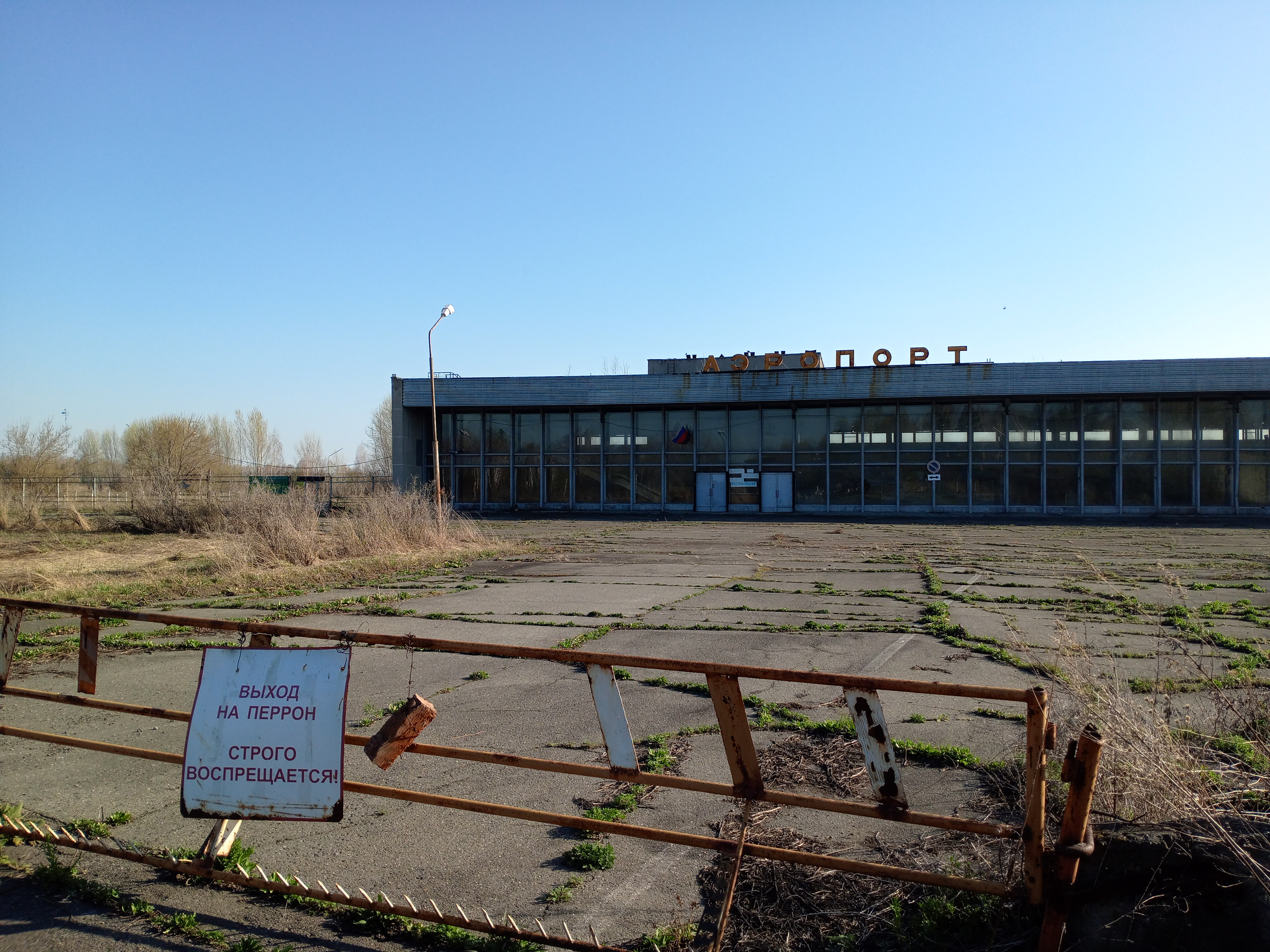
- IATA: none; ICAO: UNBI

Summary
- Airport type: Public
- Operator: JSC "Airport Biysk"
- Serves: Biysk
- Location: Biysk, Russia
- Elevation AMSL: 620 ft / 189 m
- Coordinates: 52°28′43.98″N 85°20′19.51″E
- Interactive map of Biysk Airport

Runways
Direction	Length		Surface
Direction	m	ft	Surface
10/28	1,500	4,921	Concrete

Biysk Airport (Russian: Аэропорт Бийск) (ICAO: UNBI) (Russian: Аэропорт Бийск) is an airport in Russia located 12 km southeast of Biysk. It services very small transports.

== See also ==
- List of airports in Russia
