= Konstantin Garbuz =

Russian footballer

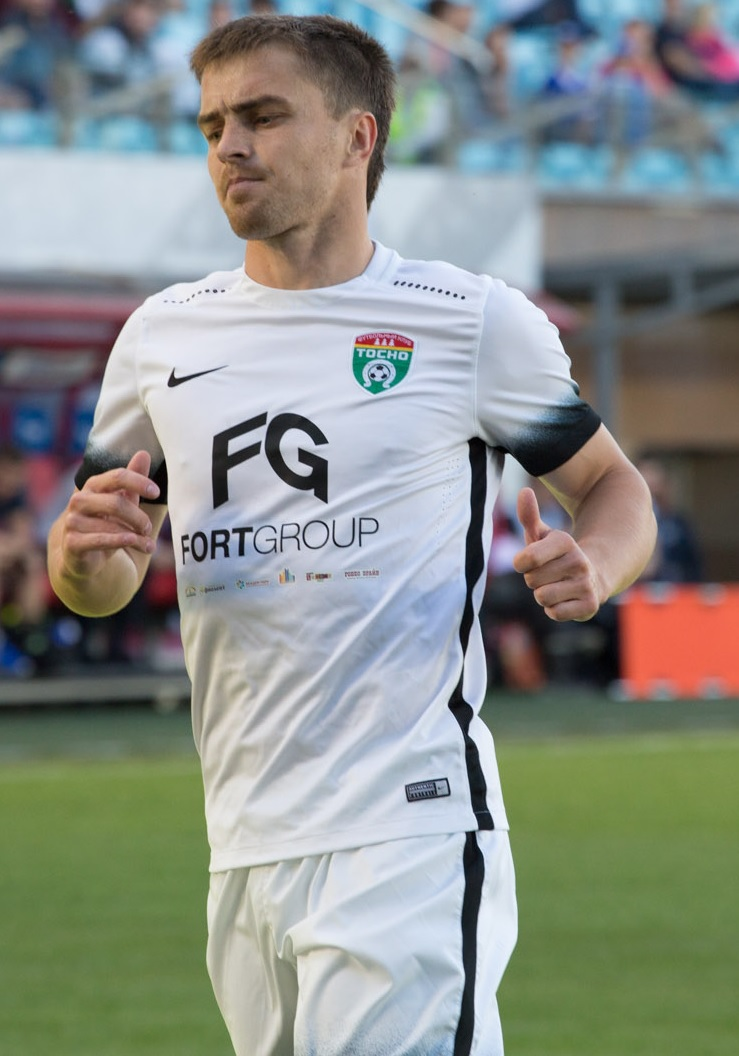
- Garbuz with Tosno in 2016

Personal information
- Full name: Konstantin Gennadyevich Garbuz
- Date of birth: 19 February 1988 (age 38)
- Place of birth: Biysk, Russian SFSR
- Height: 1.78 m (5 ft 10 in)
- Positions: Defender; midfielder

Youth career
- FC Rotor Volgograd

Senior career*
Years	Team	Apps	(Gls)
2004–2005	FC Rotor-2 Volgograd	9	(0)
2005	FC Tekstilshchik Kamyshin	10	(4)
2006–2007	FC Rostov	2	(0)
2008–2010	FC SKA-Energiya Khabarovsk	58	(2)
2010	→ FC Tyumen (loan)	16	(0)
2011–2012	FC Irtysh Omsk	31	(2)
2012–2013	FC Sokol Saratov	30	(1)
2013	PFC Spartak Nalchik	23	(0)
2014	FC Fakel Voronezh	10	(1)
2014–2015	FC Yenisey Krasnoyarsk	32	(0)
2015–2016	FC Volga Nizhny Novgorod	36	(4)
2016–2017	FC Tosno	22	(2)
2017–2018	FC Yenisey Krasnoyarsk	18	(4)
2018–2019	FC Tambov	2	(0)
2018–2019	→ FC SKA-Khabarovsk (loan)	15	(0)
2019–2022	FC Yenisey Krasnoyarsk	18	(0)
2022–2023	FC Dynamo Barnaul	18	(1)
- * Club domestic league appearances and goals

Konstantin Gennadyevich Garbuz (Russian: Константин Геннадьевич Гарбуз; born 19 February 1988) is a Russian former professional footballer.

== Club career ==
He made his debut in the Russian Premier League for FC Rostov on 26 November 2006 in a game against FC Lokomotiv Moscow.
