= Slavgorod constituency =

Russian legislative constituency

Slavgorod single-member constituency
- Constituency of the Russian State Duma
- Deputy: Denis Goloborodko; United Russia
- Federal subject: Altai Krai
- Districts: Bayevsky, Barnaul (Industrialny), Blagoveshchensky, Burlinsky, Kamensky, Khabarsky, Klyuchevsky, Krutikhinsky, Kulundinsky, Mamontovsky, Mikhaylovsky, Nemetsky, Pankrushikhinsky, Pavlovsky, Rebrikhinsky, Rodinsky, Romanovsky, Shelabolikhinsky, Slavgorod, Suyetsky, Tabunsky, Talmensky, Tyumentsevsky, Uglovsky, Volchikhinsky, Yarovoye, Zavyalovsky
- Voters: 569,203 (2026)

The Slavgorod constituency (No.46 (Note: No.38 in 1993-1995, No.37 in 1995-2003, No.37 in 2003-2007, No.42 in 2016–2026)) is a Russian legislative constituency in Altai Krai. The constituency covers part of Barnaul as well as predominantly rural northern and western Altai Krai.

The constituency has been represented since 2026 by United Russia deputy Denis Goloborodko, former Deputy Chairman of the Altai Krai Legislative Assembly and lawyer, who succeeded two-term United Russia incumbent Ivan Loor after he was redistricted to Biysk constituency.

== Boundaries ==
1993–2007: Bayevsky District, Blagoveshchensky District, Burlinsky District, Kalmansky District, Kamen-na-Obi, Kamensky District, Khabarsky District, Klyuchevsky District, Krutikhinsky District, Kulundinsky District, Mamontovsky District, Mikhaylovsky District, Nemetsky National District, Novochikhinsky District, Pankrushikhinsky, Pavlovsky District, Rebrikhinsky District, Rodinsky District, Romanovsky District, Shelabolikhinsky, Slavgorod, Slavgorodsky District, Suyetsky District, Tabunsky District, Topchikhinsky District, Tyumentsevsky, Uglovsky District, Volchikhinsky District, Zavyalovsky District
The constituency covered rural western, northern and north-central Altai Krai, including the agricultural centres of Slavgorod and Kamen-na-Obi.

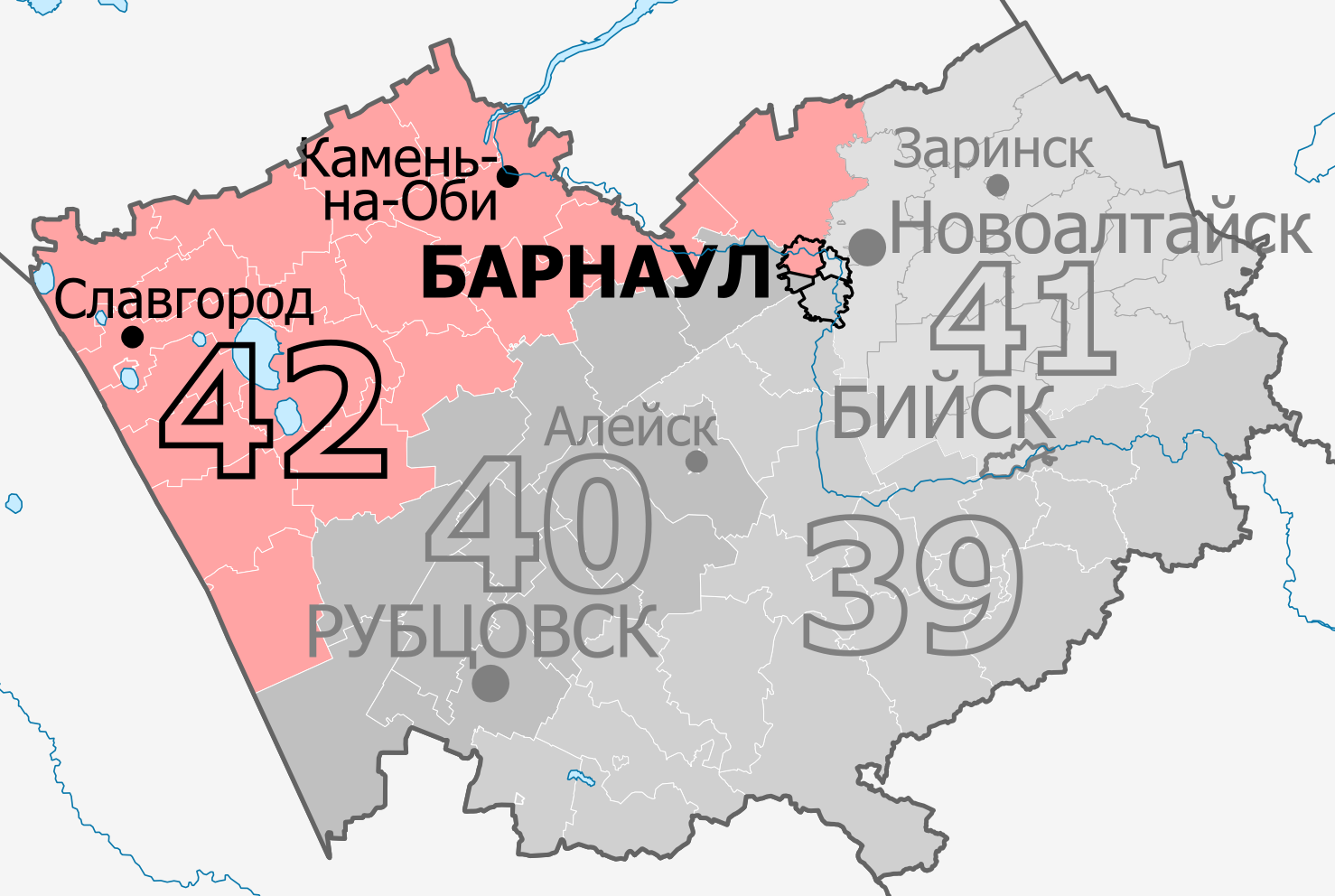
Constituency boundaries from 2016 to 2026

2016–2026: Bayevsky District, Barnaul (Leninsky), Blagoveshchensky District, Burlinsky District, Kamensky District, Khabarsky District, Klyuchevsky District, Krutikhinsky District, Kulundinsky District, Mikhaylovsky District, Nemetsky National District, Pankrushikhinsky District, Rodinsky District, Shelabolikhinsky District, Slavgorod, Suyetsky District, Tabunsky District, Talmensky District, Tyumentsevsky District, Yarovoye, Zavyalovsky District
The constituency was re-created for the 2016 election. This seat most of its territory, losing its southern portion to Rubtsovsk constituency and some districts to the south of Barnaul to Barnaul constituency. The constituency was pushed to the east gaining Leninsky city district of Barnaul from Barnaul constituency and its suburbs and exurbs to the north from Biysk constituency.

2026–present: Bayevsky District, Barnaul (Industrialny), Blagoveshchensky District, Burlinsky District, Kamensky District, Khabarsky District, Klyuchevsky District, Krutikhinsky District, Kulundinsky District, Mamontovsky District, Mikhaylovsky District, Nemetsky National District, Pankrushikhinsky District, Pavlovsky District, Rebrikhinsky District, Rodinsky District, Romanovsky District, Shelabolikhinsky District, Slavgorod, Suyetsky District, Tabunsky District, Talmensky District, Tyumentsevsky District, Uglovsky District, Volchikhinsky District, Yarovoye, Zavyalovsky District
After the 2025 redistricting Altai Krai lost one of its four constituencies, so all remaining seats saw major changes. The constituency re-gained almost all of its former territory from the dissolved Rubtsovsk constituency in central Altai Krai. This seat also lost Leninsky city district of Barnaul to Biysk constituency, swapping it for Industrialny city district from Rubtsovsk constituency.

== Members elected ==
Election	Member	Party
1993	Sergey Opyonyshev (Note: appointed Auditor of the Accounts Chamber of Russia in April 1995)	Agrarian Party
1995	Vladimir Vernigora	Agrarian Party
1999	Ivan Aparin (Note: died in December 2003)	Independent
2003	Andrey Knorr	United Russia
2007	Proportional representation - no election by constituency	
2011	Proportional representation - no election by constituency	
2016	Ivan Loor	United Russia
2021	Ivan Loor	United Russia
2026	Denis Goloborodko	United Russia

== Election results ==
=== 1993 ===
==== Declared candidates ====
- Pyotr Bernhardt (Independent), Head of Blagoveshchensky District
- Sergey Opyonyshev (APR), Chairman of the Rodinsky District Council of People's Deputies (1990–present)

==== Results ====
Summary of the 12 December 1993 Russian legislative election in the Slavgorod constituency
Candidate	Party	Votes	%
Sergey Opyonyshev	Agrarian Party	150,548	49.36%
Pyotr Bernhardt	Independent	97,572	31.99%
against all		42,046	13.78%
Total		305,014	100%

=== 1995 ===
==== Declared candidates ====
- Artur Askalonov (Independent), former People's Deputy of Russia (1990–1993)
- Nikolay Bondarchuk (DOBRo), rector of Altai State Agrarian University (1987–present), former People's Deputy of Russia (1990–1993)
- Aleksandr Gelmel (Independent), specialist
- Arkady Jenner (Kedr), Head of Burlinsky District
- Albina Kolobova (DVR–OD), former Member of Altai Krai Council of People's Deputies (1990–1994)
- Andrey Nosachev (Independent), commander of the Panfilovo training military airfield
- Viktor Popov (Independent), militsiya officer
- Mikhail Solovyov (LDPR), first secretary of the party regional office
- Sergey Tevonyan (Independent), Member of Legislative Assembly of Altai Krai (1994–present), Head of Rodinsky District (1991–present)
- Vladimir Vernigora (APR), former Member of Altai Krai Council of People's Deputies (1990–1994), agricultural executive

==== Results ====
Summary of the 17 December 1995 Russian legislative election in the Slavgorod constituency
Candidate	Party	Votes	%
Vladimir Vernigora	Agrarian Party	109,751	32.65%
Artur Askalonov	Independent	57,794	17.20%
Viktor Popov	Independent	32,092	9.55%
Aleksandr Gelmel	Independent	23,894	7.11%
Sergey Tevonyan	Independent	21,689	6.45%
Mikhail Solovyov	Liberal Democratic Party	19,404	5.77%
Nikolay Bondarchuk	Education — Future of Russia	13,641	4.06%
Albina Kolobova	Democratic Choice of Russia – United Democrats	12,809	3.81%
Andrey Nosachev	Independent	9,939	2.96%
Arkady Jenner	Kedr	8,188	2.44%
against all		21,391	6.36%
Total		336,109	100%

=== 1999 ===
==== Declared candidates ====
- Ivan Aparin (Independent), First Deputy Governor of Altai Krai – Head of the Main Department of Agriculture and Food (1997–present), former People's Deputy of the Soviet Union (1989–1991)
- Aleksandr Grebenshchikov (Independent), State Duma staffer, Russian Army major general
- Mikhail Solovyov (Independent), first secretary of the LDPR regional office, 1995 candidate for this seat
- Aleksandr Strikha (Yabloko), legal expert
- Sergey Tevonyan (OVR), Head of Rodinsky District (1991–present), former Member of Legislative Assembly of Altai Krai (1994–1996), 1995 candidate for this seat

==== Did not file ====
- Vladimir Atyasov (Stalin Bloc), former Barnaul Higher Military Aviation School of Pilots training chief (1996–1999), retired Russian Air Force colonel
- Vladimir Kirillov (Kedr), environmental lab head
- Nikolay Kurupa (Independent)
- Igor Nenashev (DN), nonprofit chairman
- Yury Toropkin (LDPR), sports school director

==== Declined ====
- Vladimir Vernigora (CPRF), incumbent Member of State Duma (1996–present) (ran on the party list)

==== Results ====
Summary of the 19 December 1999 Russian legislative election in the Slavgorod constituency
Candidate	Party	Votes	%
Ivan Aparin	Independent	176,649	53.41%
Sergey Tevonyan	Fatherland – All Russia	60,993	18.44%
Aleksandr Strikha	Yabloko	25,279	7.64%
Aleksandr Grebenshchikov	Independent	18,645	5.64%
Mikhail Solovyev	Independent	13,019	3.94%
against all		30,419	9.20%
Total		330,752	100%

=== 2003 ===
Results by district: Andrey Knorr: 20–30% 30–40% 40–50% 50–60%; Sergey Serov: 30–40% 40–50%; Yury Toropkin: 30–40%

==== Declared candidates ====
- Andrey Knorr (United Russia), Member of Altai Krai Council of People's Deputies (2000–present), agriculture businessman
- Vladimir Kolotov (SPS), businessman
- Sergey Labaznikov (The Greens), Chairman of the Kulundinsky District Committee on Ecology and Natural Resources
- Anna Poddubnaya (ORP Rus'), nonprofit president
- Aleksey Sarychev (Independent), former Member of State Duma (1994–1995)
- Sergey Serov (APR), Member of Altai Krai Council of People's Deputies (2000–present), regional agricultural union chairman
- Yury Toropkin (LDPR), Member of Uglovsky District Council of People's Deputies (2000–present), 1999 candidate for this seat

==== Did not file ====
- Leonid Blinnikov (Yabloko), agriculture businessman

==== Results ====
Summary of the 7 December 2003 Russian legislative election in the Biysk constituency
Candidate	Party	Votes	%
Andrey Knorr	United Russia	94,871	32.46%
Sergey Serov	Agrarian Party	91,732	31.38%
Aleksey Sarychev	Independent	38,262	13.09%
Yury Toropkin	Liberal Democratic Party	14,129	4.83%
Anna Poddubnaya	United Russian Party Rus'	11,342	3.88%
Vladimir Kolotov	Union of Right Forces	6,751	2.31%
Sergey Labaznikov	The Greens	5,741	1.96%
against all		25,152	8.61%
Total		292,463	100%

=== 2016 ===
==== Declared candidates ====
- Yury Bogdanov (Party of Growth), businessman
- Yevgenia Borovikova (LDPR), aide to Altai Krai Legislative Assembly member
- Ivan Fursenko (CPCR), homemaker
- Vladimir Kirillov (The Greens), environmental lab head, 2003 candidate for this seat, 2014 gubernatorial candidate
- Aleksandr Kondrov (Yabloko), food-processing machinery lab head
- Ivan Loor (United Russia), Chairman of the Altai Krai Legislative Assembly (2008–present), Member of the Legislative Assembly (1996–1997, 2008–present)
- Pyotr Ponarin (CPRF), aide to Altai Krai Legislative Assembly member
- Aleksandr Terentyev (A Just Russia), Member of State Duma (2007–present)

==== Results ====
Summary of the 18 September 2016 Russian legislative election in the Slavgorod constituency
Candidate	Party	Votes	%
Ivan Loor	United Russia	78,168	40.03%
Aleksandr Terentyev	A Just Russia	39,745	20.35%
Yevgenia Borovikova	Liberal Democratic Party	27,026	13.84%
Pyotr Ponarin	Communist Party	23,971	12.27%
Ivan Fursenko	Communists of Russia	5,975	3.06%
Aleksandr Kondrov	Yabloko	5,011	2.57%
Yury Bogdanov	Party of Growth	4,222	2.16%
Vladimir Kirillov	The Greens	3,430	1.76%
Total		195,284	100%

=== 2021 ===
==== Declared candidates ====
- Aleksandr Andryushchenko (CPCR), legal counsel, perennial candidate
- Maksim Krayn (LDPR), aide to State Duma member Yelena Strokova
- Anna Levashova (CPRF), associate professor, For a New Socialism movement activist
- Ivan Loor (United Russia), incumbent Member of State Duma (2016–present)
- Aleksandr Terentyev (SR–ZP), Member of State Duma (2007–present), 2016 candidate for this seat
- Andrey Tkachenko (Yabloko), nonprofit director
- Aleksandra Tomashevich (New People), legal counsel
- Aleksandr Tretyakov (RPPSS), surveying executive
- Sergey Ubrayev (Rodina), former Member of Altai Krai Legislative Assembly (2011–2016), businessman

==== Did not file ====
- Anton Martynenko (Independent), businessman

==== Results ====
Summary of the 17-19 September 2021 Russian legislative election in the Slavgorod constituency
Candidate	Party	Votes	%
Ivan Loor (incumbent)	United Russia	72,680	38.26%
Anna Levashova	Communist Party	39,784	20.94%
Aleksandr Terentyev	A Just Russia — For Truth	19,846	10.45%
Aleksandr Andryushchenko	Communists of Russia	18,530	9.76%
Maksim Krayn	Liberal Democratic Party	10,370	5.46%
Aleksandra Tomashevich	New People	7,905	4.16%
Aleksandr Tretyakov	Party of Pensioners	6,316	3.33%
Andrey Tkachenko	Yabloko	4,012	2.11%
Sergey Ubrayev	Rodina	2,156	1.14%
Total		189,953	100%

=== 2026 ===
==== Declared candidates ====
- Yevgenia Borovikova (A Just Russia), Member of Altai Krai Legislative Assembly (2016–present), 2016 LDPR candidate for this seat, 2023 gubernatorial candidate
- Sergey Bulayev (LDPR), Member of Altai Krai Legislative Assembly (2021–present), 2023 gubernatorial candidate
- Yulia Gaaze (CPCR), first secretary of the party regional committee
- Denis Goloborodko (United Russia), Deputy Chairman of the Altai Krai Legislative Assembly (2021–present), Member of the Legislative Assembly (2016–present)
- Lyudmila Klyushnikova (CPRF), Member of Altai Krai Legislative Assembly (2021–present)
- Galina Prusakova (RPPSS), math senior lecturer
- Igor Strantsov (New People), private college owner
- Andrey Tkachenko (Yabloko), municipal sports school administrator, 2021 candidate for this seat

==== Declined ====
- Maria Prusakova (CPRF), incumbent Member of State Duma (2021–present) (Note: redistricted from Rubtsovsk constituency), 2023 gubernatorial candidate (ran on the party list)

==== Results ====
Summary of the 18-20 September 2026 Russian legislative election in the Slavgorod constituency
Candidate	Party	Votes	%
Denis Goloborodko	United Russia	110,150	41.44%
Lyudmila Klyushnikova	Communist Party	35,249	13.26%
Yevgenia Borovikova	A Just Russia	28,008	10.54%
Sergey Bulayev	Liberal Democratic Party	23,887	8.99%
Igor Strantsov	New People	18,402	6.92%
Galina Prusakova	Party of Pensioners	15,572	5.86%
Andrey Tkachenko	Yabloko	14,822	5.58%
Yulia Gaaze	Communists of Russia	12,429	4.68%
Total		265,807	100%
