= Aleksandr Bogatyryov =

Kazakhstani footballer

Personal information
- Full name: Aleksandr Leonidovich Bogatyryov
- Date of birth: 6 March 1963
- Place of birth: Biysk, Russian SFSR
- Date of death: July 12, 2009 (aged 46)
- Place of death: Biysk, Russia
- Height: 1.70 m (5 ft 7 in)
- Positions: Forward; midfielder

Youth career
- FC Progress Biysk

Senior career*
Years	Team	Apps	(Gls)
1981–1983	FC Manometr Tomsk	72	(9)
1984–1988	FC Dynamo Barnaul	102	(19)
1988	FC Dynamo Stavropol	16	(1)
1989–1990	FC Kairat	75	(17)
1991	FC Metalurh Zaporizhya	16	(1)
1992	FC Kairat	7	(1)
1992	FC Tekstilshchik Kamyshin	13	(2)
1993	FC Dynamo Barnaul	20	(2)
1994	FC Sakhalin Kholmsk	24	(1)
1995–1997	FC Viktoriya Nazarovo	82	(23)
2002–2003	FC Dynamo Biysk		

International career
1992	Kazakhstan	1	(0)
- * Club domestic league appearances and goals

Aleksandr Leonidovich Bogatyryov (Russian: Александр Леонидович Богатырёв; born 6 March 1963 in Biysk; died 12 July 2009 in Biysk) was a Kazakhstani football player of Russian origin.

== Honours ==
Kairat

- Kazakhstan Premier League champion: 1992
- Kazakhstan Cup winner: 1992
