= Altai State Pedagogical University =

- Алтайский государственный педагогический университет
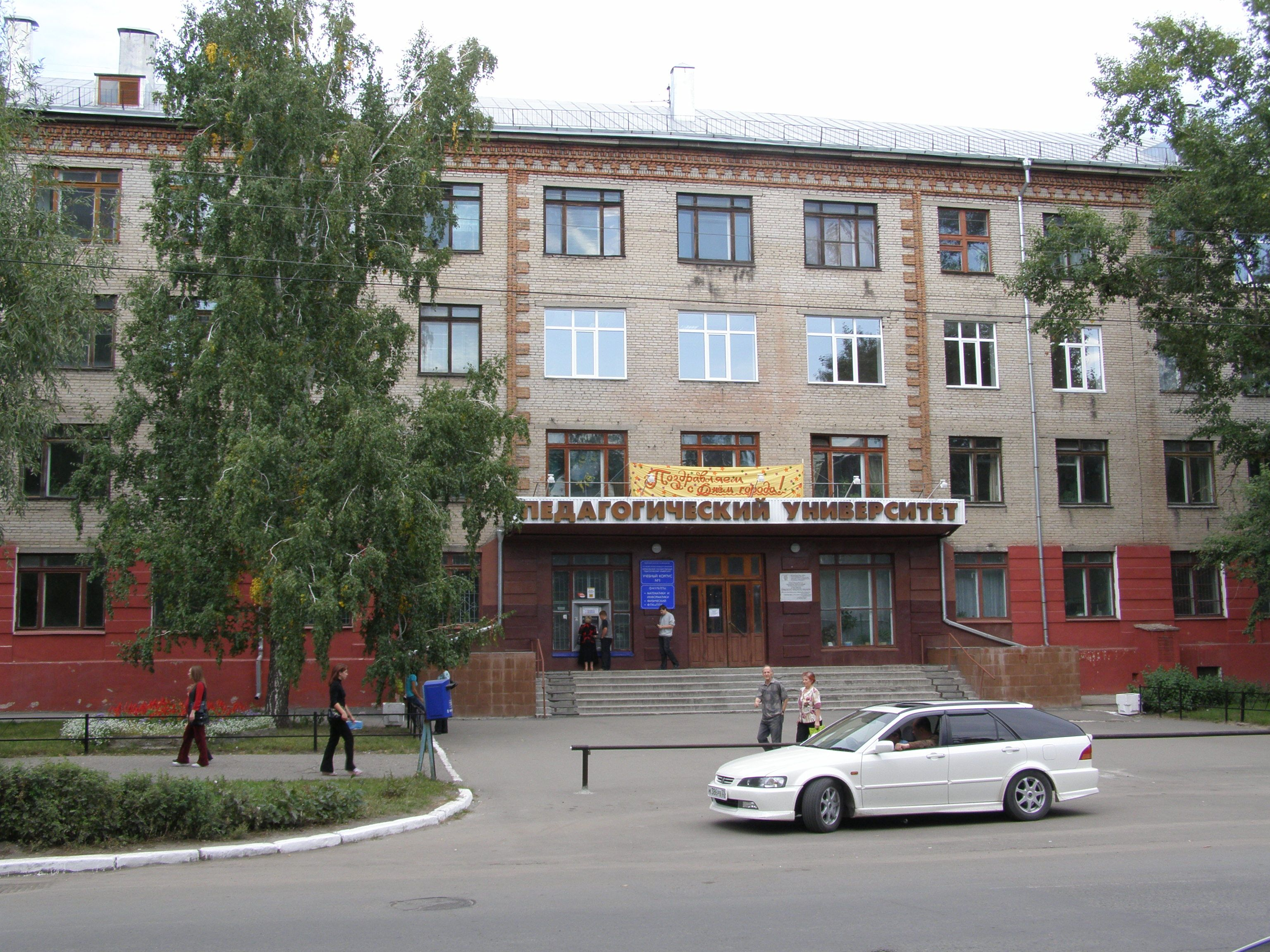
- Altai State Pedagogical University campus
- Type: Pedagogical
- Established: 1933
- Rector: Prof. Irina R. Lazarenko
- Academic staff: 5 institutions, 2 faculties
- Students: 6000
- Location: Barnaul, Altai Krai, Russia; 53°20′30″N 83°45′41″E
- Campus: Urban
- Website: http://www.altspu.ru/

Altai State Pedagogical University (Russian: Алтайский государственный педагогический университет) is a federal state budget institution of higher education in Barnaul, Russia.

== History ==
At the beginning of the 20th century, by 1911 there were only 624 primary schools, and the opening of new educational institutions was hampered by a shortage of teaching staff. On May 20, 1915, the decision to open the teacher's seminary in Barnaul with an elementary school was made based on the approval of the state list of income and expenses for 1915.

The Barnaul Teaching Institute was established on September 1, 1933, and its first graduates finished their studies at the institute in 1935. In 1941 the educational institution was renamed into Barnaul State Pedagogical Institute.

In 1993 Barnaul State Pedagogical Institute received a university status. In 2009 Barnaul State Pedagogical University (Russian: Барнаульский государственный педагогический университет) became Altai State Pedagogical Academy, which regained the university status in 2014.

== Structure ==
Altai State Pedagogical University includes:

- Institute of History, Social Communications and Law
- Institute of Information Technology, Physics and Mathematics
- Institute of Linguistics
- Institute of Philology and Intercultural Communication
- Institute of Physical Education and Sports
- Institute of Psychology and Pedagogy
- Institute of Supplementary education
- Interfaculty Departments
- V.M. Shukshin Biysk Branch
