= Ivan Loor =

Russian politician

- Иван Лоор
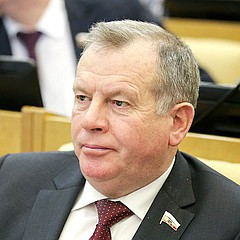
- Loor in 2018

Member of the State Duma for Altai Krai
- Incumbent
- Assumed office 5 October 2016
- Preceded by: constituency re-established
- Constituency: Slavgorod (No. 42)

Chairman of the Altai Krai Legislative Assembly
- In office 20 March 2008 – 18 September 2016
- Preceded by: Aleksandr Nazarchuk
- Succeeded by: Aleksandr Romanenko

Personal details
- Born: 11 December 1955 (age 70) Obskoye, Kamensky District, Altai Krai, RSFSR, Soviet Union
- Party: United Russia (2007–)

Ivan Ivanovich Loor (Russian: Иван Иванович Лоор; born 11 December 1955) is a Russian politician. He is the United Russia member of the State Duma for the Slavgorod constituency.

Ivan Loor was born on 11 December 1955 in Altai Krai to a Russian German family. He worked as agronomist at Plotnikovsky state farm and became its chairman in 1985.

In 1996 Loor elected to the Altai Krai Legislative Assembly. From 1997 he was an advisor to governor Alexander Surikov. From 2008 to 2016 Loor served as chairman of the Altai Krai Legislative Assembly. Since 2016 he represents Slavgorod constituency of Altai Krai in the State Duma of the Russian Federation.
