= Tselinny District =

Tselinny District may refer to:

- Tselinny District, Russia, name of several districts in Russia
- Tselinny District, name of Gabit Musirepov District in North Kazakhstan Province, Kazakhstan, until 2002
