= Tselinnoye, Kurgan Oblast =

Rural locality in Kurgan Oblast, Russia

Coordinates: 54°30′01″N 63°39′50″E

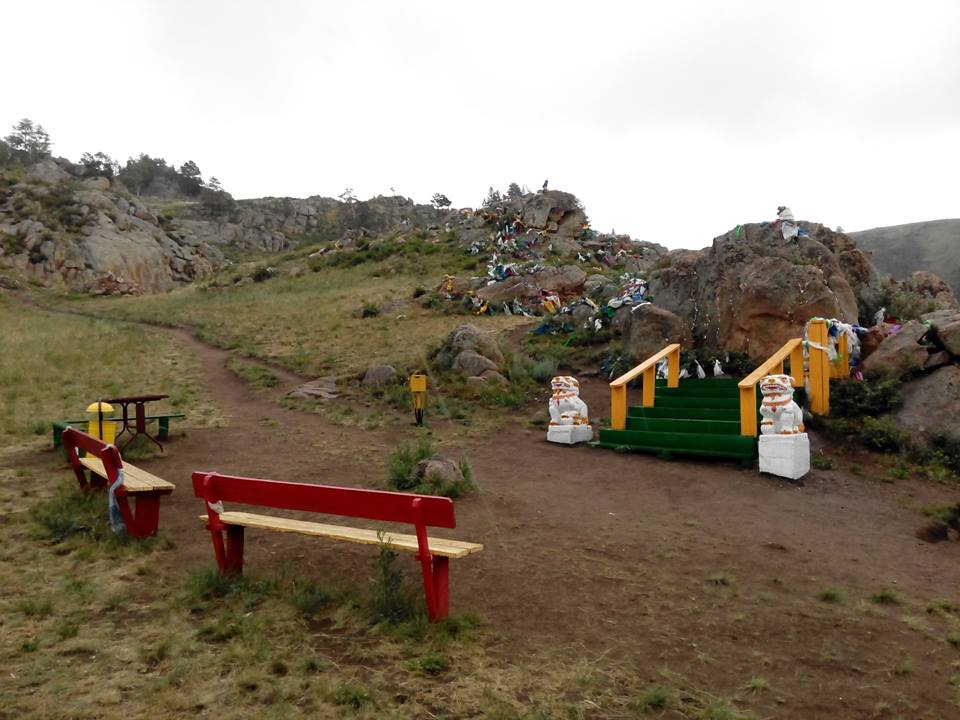
Целинное

Tselinnoye (Russian: Целинное) is a rural locality (a selo) and the administrative center of Tselinny District, Kurgan Oblast, Russia. Population: 5,076 (2010 census); 5,843 (2002 census); 6,064 (1989 Soviet census).
