= Tselinny, Khabarsky District, Altai Krai =

Tselinny Целинный
- Settlement
- Location within Altai Krai Location within Russia
- Coordinates: 53°45′N 79°42′E
- Country: Russia
- Region: Altai Krai
- District: Khabarsky District
- Time zone: UTC+7:00

Tselinny (Russian: Целинный) is a rural locality (a settlement) in Korotoyaksky Selsoviet, Khabarsky District, Altai Krai, Russia. The population was 612 as of 2013. There are 10 streets.

== Geography ==
Tselinny is located 22 km north of Khabary (the district's administrative centre) by road. Korotoyak is the nearest rural locality.
