= Obskoye =

Obskoye Обское
- Selo
- Location within Altai Krai Location within Russia
- Coordinates: 53°39′N 81°40′E
- Country: Russia
- Region: Altai Krai
- District: Kamensky District
- Time zone: UTC+7:00

Obskoye (Russian: Обское) is a rural locality (a selo) in Gonokhovsky Selsoviet, Kamensky District, Altai Krai, Russia. The population was 296 as of 2013. There are 8 streets.

== Geography ==
Obskoye is located 39 km southeast of Kamen-na-Obi (the district's administrative centre) by road. Gonokhovo is the nearest rural locality.
