= Tselinny, Republic of Bashkortostan =

Tselinny Целинный
- Selo
- Location within Bashkortostan Location within Russia
- Coordinates: 53°01′N 58°43′E
- Country: Russia
- Region: Bashkortostan
- District: Abzelilovsky District
- Time zone: UTC+5:00

Tselinny (Russian: Целинный; Bashkir: Сиҙәм, Siźäm) is a rural locality (a selo) and the administrative center of Almukhametovsky Selsoviet, Abzelilovsky District, Bashkortostan, Russia. The population was 1,404 as of 2010. There are 16 streets.

== Geography ==
Tselinny is located 51 km south of Askarovo (the district's administrative centre) by road. Almukhametovo is the nearest rural locality.
