= Evalar =

Russian dietary supplement company

- Company type: Closed joint-stock company
- Industry: Dietary supplements
- Predecessor: Altai Research Institute of Chemical Technology
- Founded: 1991
- Founder: Larisa Prokopieva
- Headquarters: Biysk, Russia
- Revenue: 7,400,000,000 Russian ruble (2013)
- Net income: 1,800,000,000 (2013)
- Website: evalar.ru

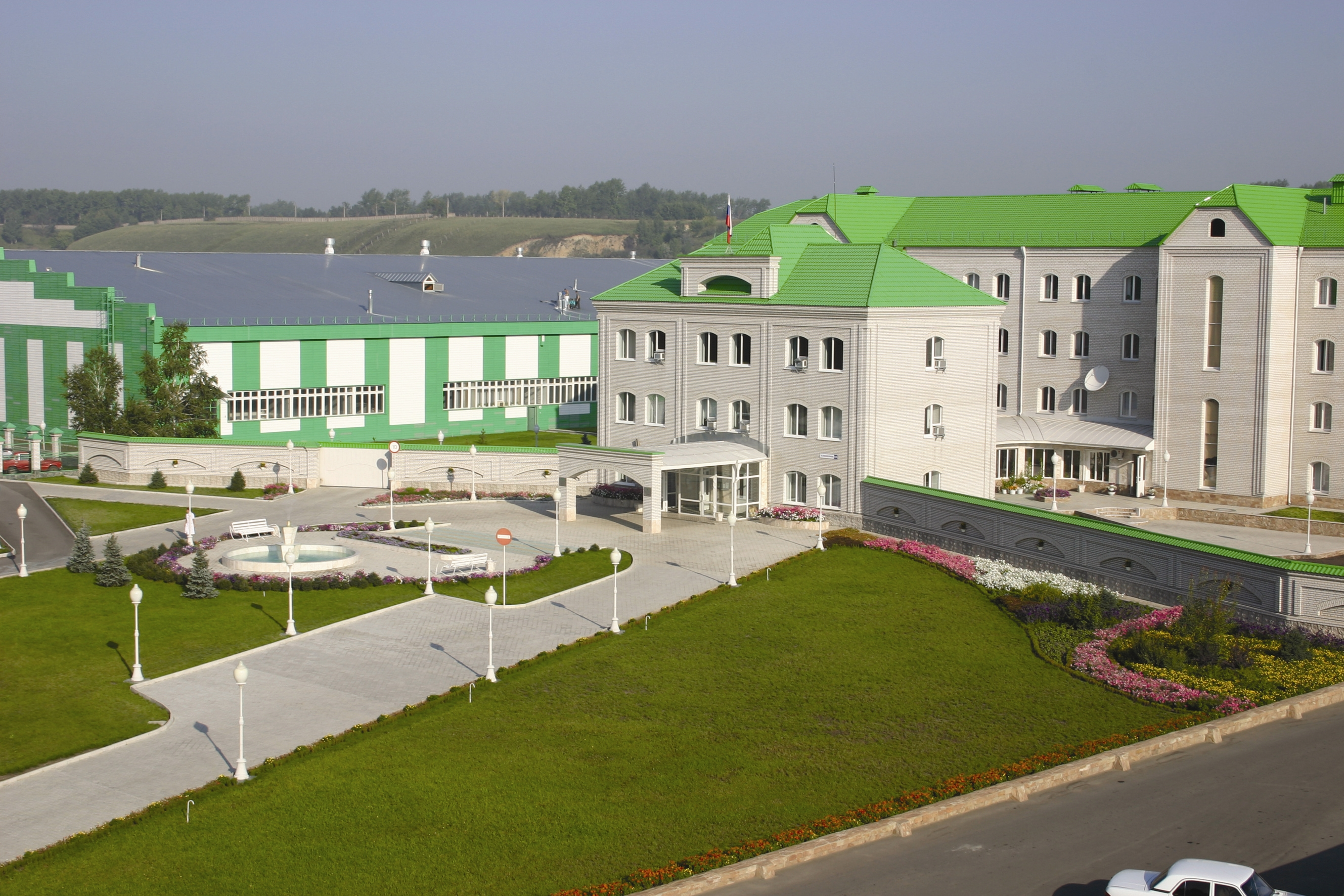
Evalar Company office

Evalar (Russian: Эвалар) is a Russian company producing dietary supplements. As of 2014, it held the largest share – 17% – of Russia's dietary supplements market.

== History ==
The company was established in 1991 on the basis of Altai Research Institute of Chemical Technology. The original institute was a Soviet defence industry establishment producing gas coolers for the military. As the Soviet Union collapsed and the state enterprises were privatized, Larisa Prokopieva, who at the time headed one of the departments of the Institute, converted its facilities, originally to produce bubble gum, then cosmetics, and later, dietary supplements. The name of the new company was formed by combining the names of its two female executives: Eva — Eva Dąbrowska — and Lar — Larisa Prokopyeva.

In 1996, Evalar began placing advertisements in nationwide publications, which doubled its revenue to 17 million rubles. In 1997, revenue doubled again. In 1998, it grew to 78 million rubles, and three years later reached 138 million rubles. The company invested 12–15% of its income in advertising each year. In 2013, 2.5 billion rubles were spent on marketing, which placed Evalar 21st in the ranking of Russia’s largest advertisers.

In 2002, Evalar invested 450 million rubles of its own funds in the construction of a manufacturing complex compliant with international GMP quality standards. The plant became operational two years later. In addition, the manufacturer owns herb plantations covering 1,000 hectares in the foothills of the Altai Mountains, which supply about 30% of its raw materials; the remainder (herbal extracts, vitamins, and amino acids) is purchased abroad.

== Criticism ==
Cardiologist Sergey Agarkov criticized the company for the following:

- The lack of information on high-quality evidence regarding the effectiveness of its products;
- Advertising dietary supplements in a way that presents them as pharmaceutical drugs;
- The absence of data on the amounts of active substances in the products.

Some of the company’s products are released in two forms (as a pharmaceutical drug and as a dietary supplement), which can mislead consumers.

In 2017, the British cosmetics manufacturer DR. ORGANIC LTD obtained a court ruling prohibiting Evalar JSC from using the brand name “Doctor Organic” in Russia.

In March 2019, Roszdravnadzor and the media accused dietary supplement manufacturers of attempting to brand their products with names that closely resemble those of pharmaceutical drugs.
