= Mikhail Berulava =

Russian scientist and politician

Mikhail Berulava MP
- Михаил Берулава; მიხეილ ბერულავა
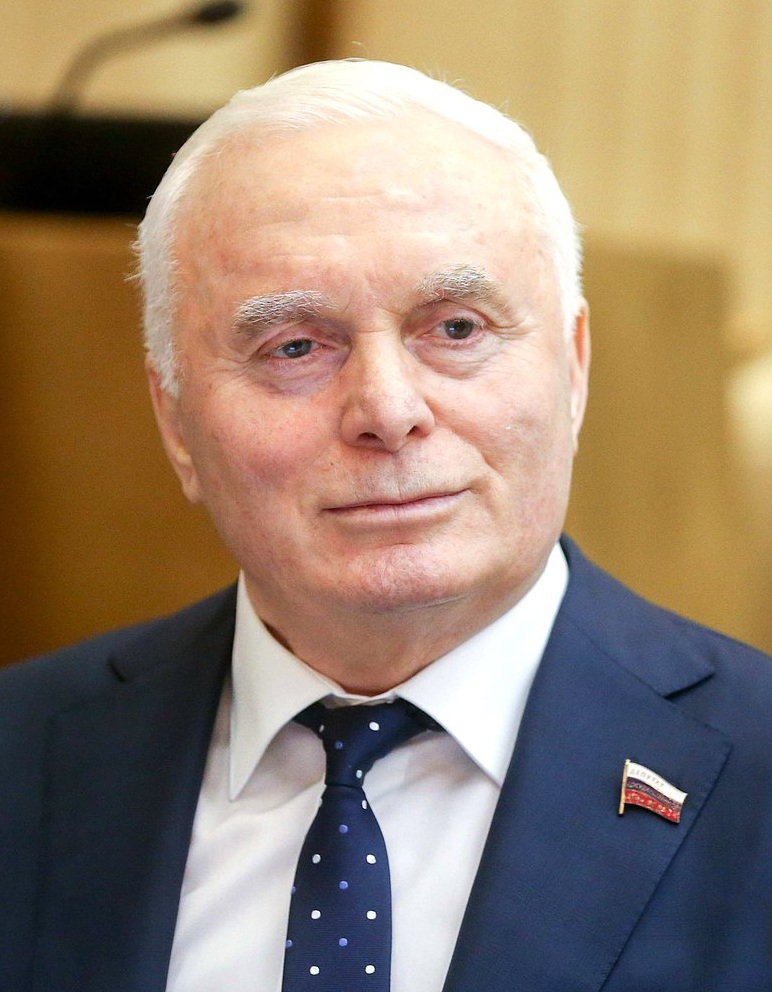
- Berulava at a State Duma plenary session, dated 4 November 2019

Member of the State Duma (Party List Seat)
- Incumbent
- Assumed office 11 April 2019
- Preceded by: Zhores Alferov
- In office 21 December 2011 – 5 October 2016

Personal details
- Born: 3 August 1950 (age 74); Sukhumi, Abkhaz ASSR, Georgian SSR, USSR
- Political party: Communist Party of the Russian Federation
- Spouse: Galina Berulava
- Children: 1 son; 1 daughter
- Education: Chelyabinsk Mechanization and Agricultural Electrification Institute (EdD, DSc)
- Occupation: Professor
- Awards: Order of Friendship (2008); Order of Honour (2016)

Mikhail Nikolaevich Berulava (Russian: Михаил Николаевич Берулава; Georgian: მიხეილ ნიკოლოზის-ძე ბერულავა; born 3 August 1950, Sukhumi) is a Russian scientist and politician. He is the Deputy of the State Duma of Russia, a member of the Communist Party of the Russian Federation (CPRF), and is the Deputy Chairman of the Committee on Education. Doctor of pedagogical sciences, professor, and academician of the Russian Academy of Education. Member of the Presidium of the Russian Academy of Education.

== Biography ==
Berulava was born on 3 August 1950 in Sukhumi, at the time the capital of the Abkhaz Autonomous Soviet Socialist Republic, part of the Georgian Soviet Socialist Republic, but is now the capital of the partially recognized Abkhazia. In 1978, he graduated from the Chelyabinsk Mechanization and Agricultural Electrification Institute, which is now part of South-Ural State Agrarian University.

He became a Candidate of Pedagogical Sciences in 1982 and a Doctor of Pedagogical Sciences in 1989, working in various academic and education administrative since the mid-1980s. He is the editor-in-chief of "Humanization of Education" and "Herald of the Russian Academy of Education University".

=== Political career ===
Berulava was a member of the Civic Chamber of the Russian Federation from 2008 to 2010. In the 2011 Russian legislative election, he received a deputy mandate in the 6th State Duma on the list of the CPRF. In the 2016 election, the communist party lost 50 seats and his mandate was not renewed. However, the death of Russian Nobel laureate and politician Zhores Alferov in 2019 brought Berulava back to the State Duma to fill his vacant seat. In the 2021 election, he was re-elected for the 8th State Duma.

=== Academic works ===
Mikhail Berulava is the founder of the theory of humanization of education, which has now become a widely recognized scientific paradigm. Many of his works have been translated into foreign languages and published internationally, including in the USA, Germany, and other countries.

- Berulava, M. Basics of Modern Education. Seattle, USA, 2008.
- Berulava, M.N. Integration of Educational Content. Moscow: Sovershenstvo, 1998.
- Berulava, M.N. Theory and Practice of Humanization of Education. Moscow: Gelios, 2000.
- Berulava, M.N. Fundamentals of Economics. Moscow: Logos, 2002.
- Berulava, M.N. Fundamentals of Modern Pedagogy. Moscow: NOTS RAO, 2004.
- Berulava, M.N., Berulava, G.A. "Methodological foundations of students' personal development in higher education institutions." Vestnik Universiteta Rossiiskoi Akademii Obrazovaniya, 2009, No. 4.
- Berulava, M.N., Berulava, G.A. "Methodological foundations of an innovative network concept of personal development in the information society." In: Problems of Quality Management in Education at Humanities Universities. St. Petersburg, 2010.
- Berulava, M.N., Berulava, G.A. "A new network theory of personal development in the informational educational space." Psychological Science and Education, No. 1, 2012.

== Sanctions ==
Berulava was sanctioned by the UK government in 2022 concerning the Russo-Ukrainian War.

== Awards ==
Order of Friendship (March 11, 2008)

== Some publications ==
- «Basics of Modern Education» (North American University Press, 2008., 117 p.)
