= Shukshin Altai State University for Humanities and Pedagogy =

Former pedagogical university in Biysk, Russia

- Алтайский государственный гуманитарно-педагогический университет В. М. Шукшина
- Established: 1939
- Location: Biysk, Altai Krai, Russia; 52.5369°N 85.1958°E
- Campus: Urban
- Website: www.bigpi.biysk.ru/wwwsite/

Shukshin Altai State University for Humanities and Pedagogy (Russian: Алтайский государственный гуманитарно-педагогический университет имени В. М. Шукшина) was a federal state budget educational institution of higher education in Biysk, Altai Krai (Russia), transformed into V.M. Shukshin Biysk Branch of Altai State Pedagogical University in 2024.

== History ==
Biysk Teachers' Institute was established in 1939 and became a pedagogical (teachers' training) institute in 1953. In 2000 this institution of higher education received a university status. In 2001 Biysk Pedagogical State University was named after V. M. Shukshin. In 2010 the Shukshin Pedagogical State University of Biysk (Russian: Бийский педагогический государственный университет имени В. М. Шукшина) became the Shukshin Altai State Academy of Education (Russian: Алтайская государственная академия образования имени В. М. Шукшина), and got its current name when it regained the university status in 2015.

Shukshin Altai State University for Humanities and Pedagogy offered bachelor’s degree teachers-training programs in English, German, Chinese, Russian Language and Literature, Primary & Preschool Education, Physical Culture & Health, Mathematics, Physics, Computer Science, Biology, Chemistry, Geography, and Technology. Bachelor’s degree programs in Psychology, Tourism, Fine Arts & Design, Land Management, Biology & Ecology were also available.

In 2022 Pedagogical Techno-park (Educational Technopark) was opened at the university with labs for conducting pedagogical experiments.

In 2024 the university was transformed into V.M. Shukshin Biysk Branch of Altai State Pedagogical University.

== Institutes ==
- Institute of Humanities
- Institute of Natural Sciences and Vocational Education
- Institute of Pedagogy and Psychology

== Campus ==
Shukshin Altai State University for Humanities and Pedagogy occupied four buildings in the city of Biysk.

== Research ==
At ASUHP named after V. Shukshin, a number of researchers are working on actual topics in Personality, Educational Psychology, Social Psychology and Motivation; Psycholinguistics and Second Language Studies, Cultural Studies; Electrical Engineering and Power Electronics; Ornithological research in Altai; Studies of the regional insect fauna; Petrology of gold-generating magmatism; Condensed Matter Physics. All research results of the university scholars are introduced into the system of school education. Despite the fact that the university has only 100 scholars, according to Ranking Web of Universities (Webometrics) Shukshin University ranks 294 out of 1042 universities in Russia (that is, it is included in the second quartile of the best universities in Russia).
