= Novikovo, Belgorod Oblast =

Novikovo Новиково
- Selo
- Location within Belgorod Oblast Location within Russia
- Coordinates: 51°09′N 37°53′E
- Country: Russia
- Region: Belgorod Oblast
- District: Starooskolsky District
- Time zone: UTC+3:00

Novikovo (Russian: Новиково) is a rural locality (a selo) in Starooskolsky District, Belgorod Oblast, Russia. The population was 51 as of 2010. There are 2 streets.

== Geography ==
Novikovo is located 21 km south of Stary Oskol (the district's administrative centre) by road. Pesochny is the nearest rural locality.
