= Tselinny, Volgograd Oblast =

Tselinny Целинный
- Settlement
- Location within Volgograd Oblast Location within Russia
- Coordinates: 49°51′N 46°07′E
- Country: Russia
- Region: Volgograd Oblast
- District: Nikolayevsky District
- Time zone: UTC+4:00

Tselinny (Russian: Целинный) is a rural locality (a settlement) in Sovkhozskoye Rural Settlement, Nikolayevsky District, Volgograd Oblast, Russia. The population was 25 as of 2010.

== Geography ==
Tselinny is located in steppe of the Transvolga, 68 km ESE of Nikolayevsk (the district's administrative centre) by road. Razdolnoye is the nearest rural locality.
