= Tselinny, Klyuchevsky District, Altai Krai =

Tselinny Целинный
- Selo
- Location within Altai Krai Location within Russia
- Coordinates: 52°15′N 79°14′E
- Country: Russia
- Region: Altai Krai
- District: Klyuchevsky District
- Time zone: UTC+7:00

Tselinny (Russian: Целинный) is a rural locality (a selo) and the administrative center of Novotselinny Selsoviet, Klyuchevsky District, Altai Krai, Russia. The population was 1,189 as of 2013. There are 15 streets.

== Geography ==
Tselinny is located 6 km east of Klyuchi (the district's administrative centre) by road. Klyuchi is the nearest rural locality.
