= Tselinny District, Kurgan Oblast =

Tselinny District Целинный район (Russian)
- District
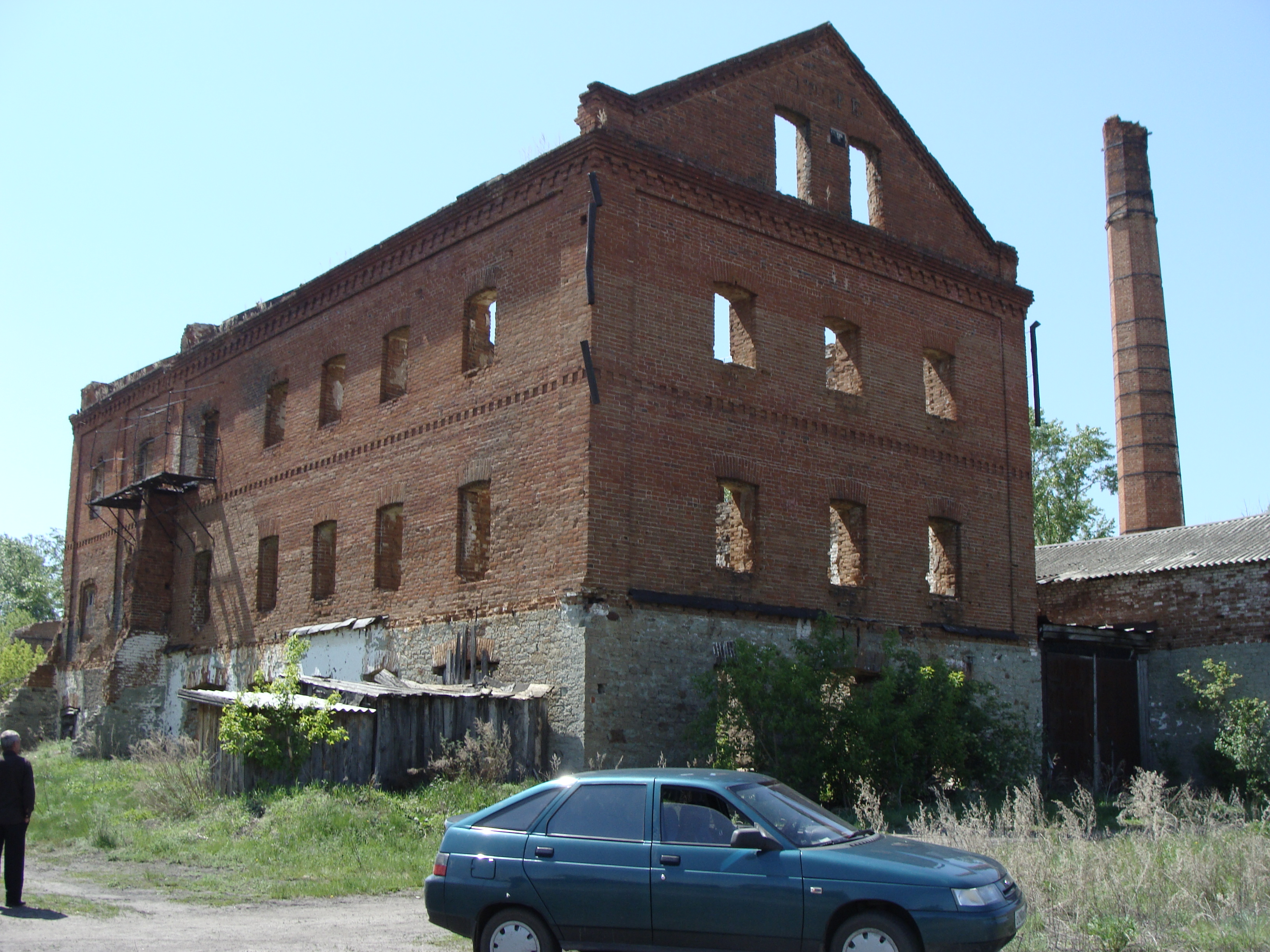
- Ruined mill, Tselinny District

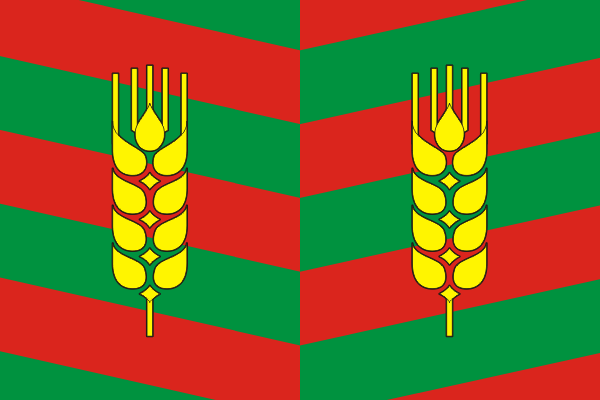
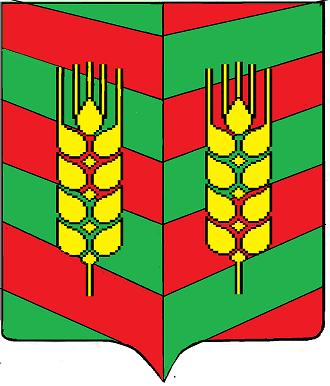
- Flag Coat of arms
- Location of Tselinny District in Kurgan Oblast
- Coordinates: 54°30′03″N 63°40′09″E
- Country: Russia
- Federal subject: Kurgan Oblast
- Established: 3 November 1923
- Administrative center: Tselinnoye

Area
  - Total: 3,460 km^{2} (1,340 sq mi)

Population (2010 Census)
  - Total: 17,187
  - Density: 4.97/km^{2} (12.9/sq mi)
  - Urban: 0%
  - Rural: 100%

Administrative structure
  - Administrative divisions: 19 selsoviet
  - Inhabited localities: 48 rural localities

Municipal structure
  - Municipally incorporated as: Tselinny Municipal District
  - Municipal divisions: 0 urban settlements, 19 rural settlements
- Time zone: UTC+5 (MSK+2)
- OKTMO ID: 37634000
- Website: http://celinniyrayon45.ucoz.ru/

Tselinny District (Russian: Цели́нный райо́н) is an administrative and municipal district (raion), one of the twenty-four in Kurgan Oblast, Russia. It is located in the south of the oblast. The area of the district is 3,460 square kilometers (1,340 sq mi). Its administrative center is the rural locality (a selo) of Tselinnoye. Population: 17,187 (2010 census); 23,058 (2002 Census); 25,316 (1989 Soviet census). The population of Tselinnoye accounts for 29.5% of the district's total population.
