= Tselinnoye, Altai Krai =

Tselinnoye Целинное
- Village
- Location within Altai Krai Location within Russia
- Coordinates: 53°04′N 85°39′E
- Country: Russia
- Region: Altai Krai
- District: Tselinny District
- Time zone: UTC+7:00

Tselinnoye (Russian: Целинное) is a rural locality (a selo) and the administrative center of Tselinny Selsoviet and Tselinny District, Altai Krai, Russia. The population was 4,836 in 2016. There are 56 streets.

== Geography ==
The village is located 170 km south-east from Barnaul.
