= Tselinny District, Altai Krai =

Tselinny District Целинный район (Russian)
- District
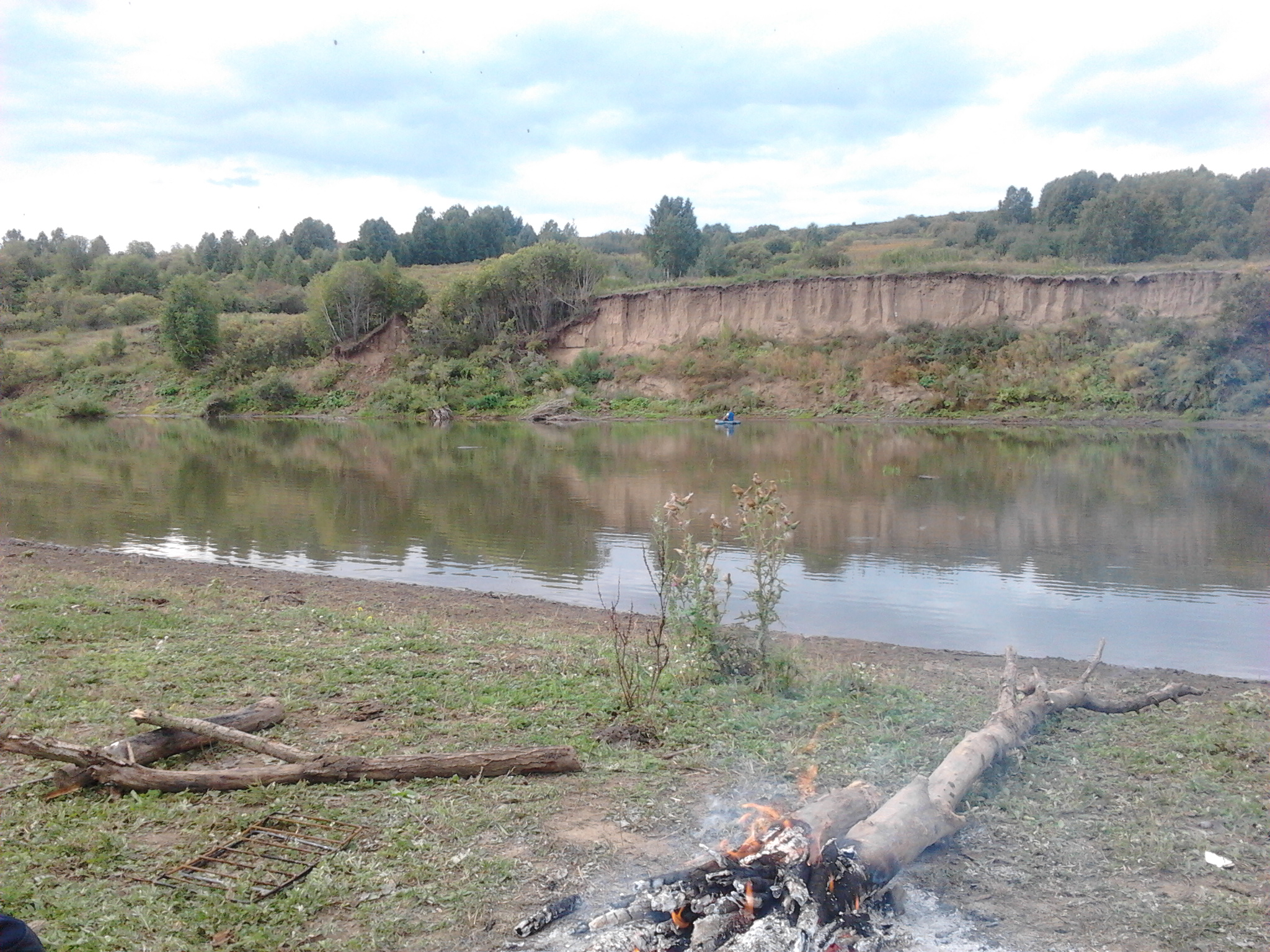
- Camp scene on river in Tselinny District

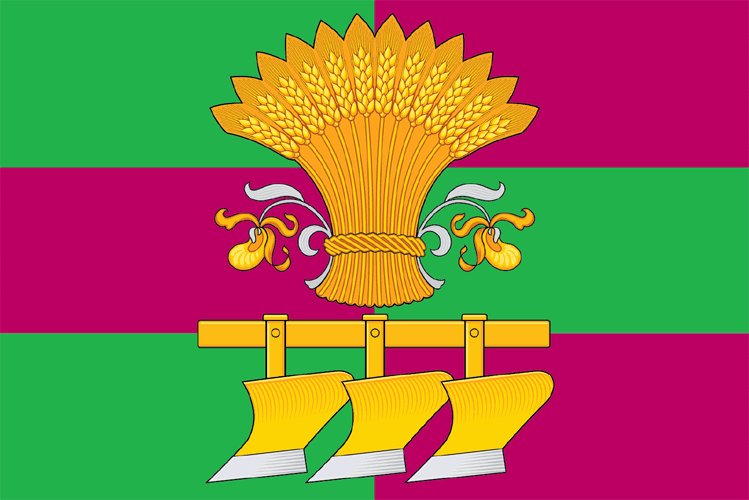
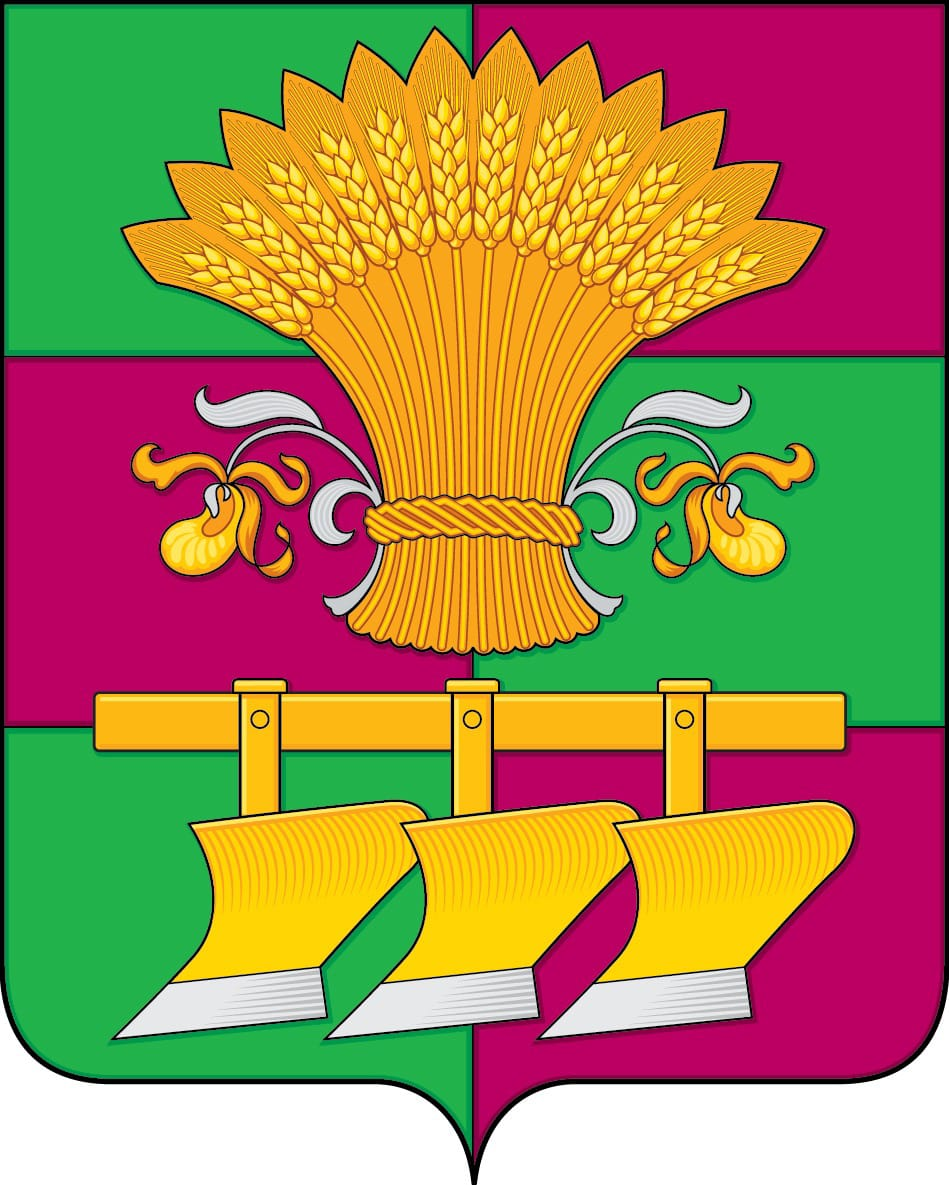
- Flag Coat of arms
- Location of Tselinny District in Altai Krai
- Coordinates: 53°05′00″N 85°40′40″E
- Country: Russia
- Federal subject: Altai Krai
- Administrative center: Tselinnoye

Area
  - Total: 2,882 km^{2} (1,113 sq mi)

Population (2010 Census)
  - Total: 16,403
  - Density: 5.692/km^{2} (14.74/sq mi)
  - Urban: 0%
  - Rural: 100%

Administrative structure
  - Administrative divisions: 12 selsoviet
  - Inhabited localities: 22 rural localities

Municipal structure
  - Municipally incorporated as: Tselinny Municipal District
  - Municipal divisions: 0 urban settlements, 12 rural settlements
- Time zone: UTC+7 (MSK+4)
- OKTMO ID: 01657000
- Website: http://admcelinnoe.ucoz.ru/

Tselinny District (Russian: Цели́нный райо́н) is an administrative and municipal district (raion), one of the fifty-nine in Altai Krai, Russia. It is located in the east of the krai. The area of the district is 2,882 square kilometers (1,113 sq mi). Its administrative center is the rural locality (a selo) of Tselinnoye. Population: 16,403 (2010 census); 19,888 (2002 census); 21,297 (1989 Soviet census). The population of Tselinnoye accounts for 32.2% of the district's total population.
