= Biysky District =

Biysky District Бийский район (Russian)
- District
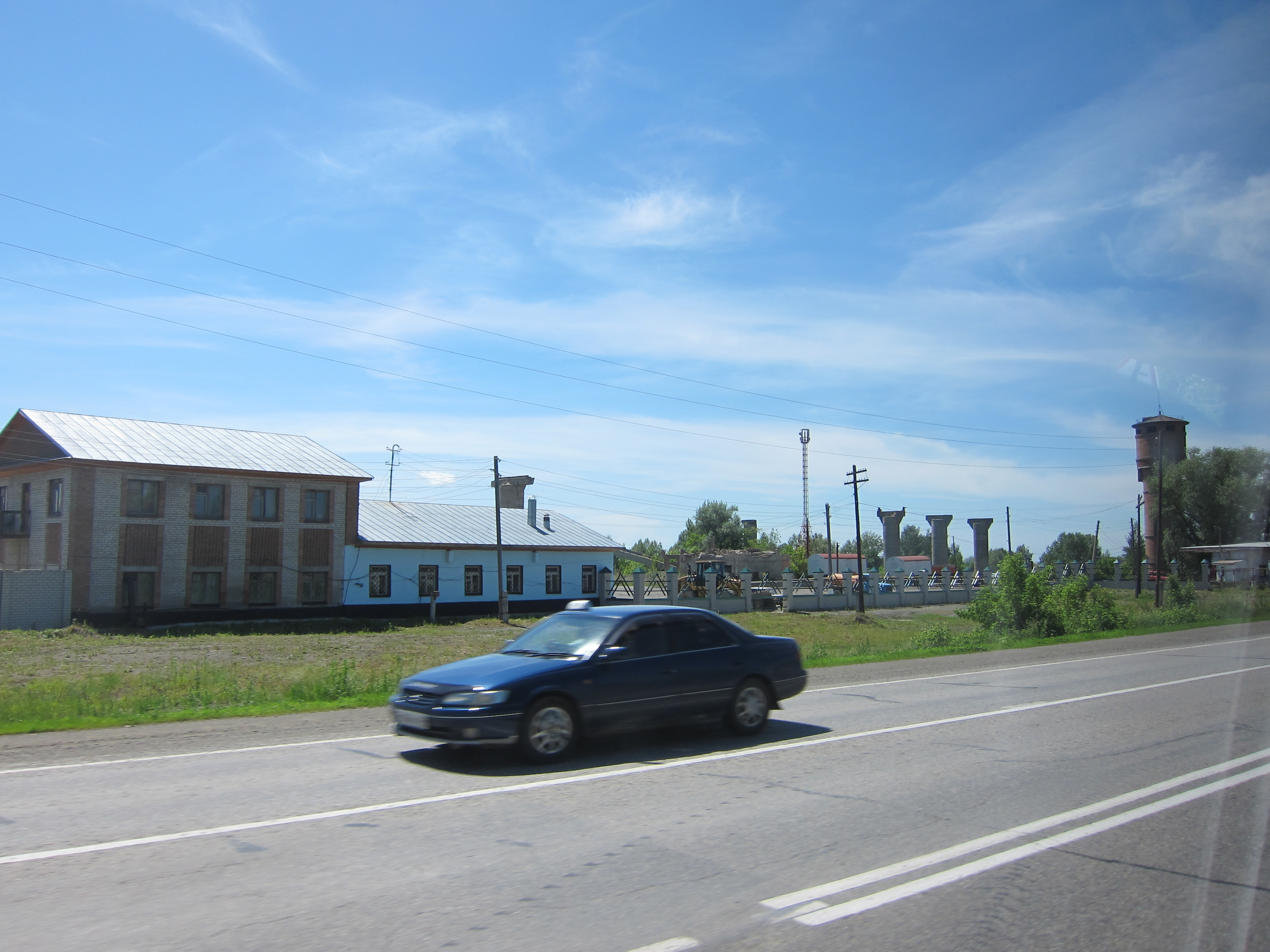
- M52 Highway in the settlement of Chuysky in Biysky District

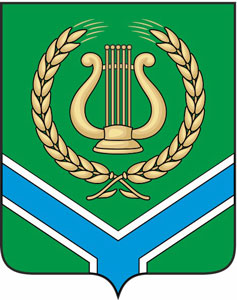
- Coat of arms
- Location of Biysky District in Altai Krai
- Coordinates: 52°31′00″N 85°10′00″E
- Country: Russia
- Federal subject: Altai Krai
- Established: May 27, 1924 (first), February 1, 1963 (second)
- Administrative center: Biysk

Area
  - Total: 2,173 km^{2} (839 sq mi)

Population (2010 Census)
  - Total: 34,067
  - Density: 15.68/km^{2} (40.60/sq mi)
  - Urban: 0%
  - Rural: 100%

Administrative structure
  - Administrative divisions: 15 selsoviet
  - Inhabited localities: 37 rural localities

Municipal structure
  - Municipally incorporated as: Biysky Municipal District
  - Municipal divisions: 0 urban settlements, 15 rural settlements
- Time zone: UTC+7 (MSK+4)
- OKTMO ID: 01604000
- Website: http://biysk.biysk22.ru/

Biysky District (Russian: Би́йский райо́н) is an administrative and municipal district (raion), one of the fifty-nine in Altai Krai, Russia. It is located in the east of the krai and borders with Zonalny, Tselinny, Soltonsky, Krasnogorsky, Sovetsky, and Smolensky Districts, as well as with the territory of the City of Biysk. The area of the district is 2,200 square kilometers (850 sq mi). Its administrative center is the city of Biysk (which is not administratively a part of the district). District's population: 34,067 (2010 census); 35,740 (2002 census); 32,678 (1989 Soviet census).

== Geography ==
Biysky District is located in the eastern part of the krai, in the southern part of Biysko-Chumyshskaya Highland. The terrain is rugged and people extract sand and gravel.

The Biya, Katun, Bekhtemir, Shubenka, and Nenya Rivers flow through the district. Pines, birches, aspens, alders, sorbus, viburnum, bird cherries, and poplar grow in this area.

== History ==
The district was established on May 27, 1924 as one of the eighteen districts comprising Biysky Uyezd of Altai Governorate. The district was abolished and merged into newly formed Zonalny District on October 5, 1939. On February 1, 1963, Zonalny District was abolished, merged with Krasnogorsky and Soltonsky Districts, as well as with the parts of Marushensky District, and established once more as Biysky District.

== Administrative and municipal status ==
Within the framework of administrative divisions, Biysky District is one of the fifty-nine in the krai. The city of Biysk serves as its administrative center, despite being incorporated separately as a city of krai significance—an administrative unit with the status equal to that of the districts.

As a municipal division, the district is incorporated as Biysky Municipal District. The city of krai significance of Biysk is incorporated separately from the district as Biysk Urban Okrug.

== Economy ==
The basic economy in the district is farming, including the production of grain, sugar beets, milk, meat, and livestock.

== Climate ==
The climate is continental with the average January temperature being −18 °C (0 °F) and the average July temperature being +18.9 °C (66.0 °F). The annual precipitation is 520 millimeters (20 in).
