= Biysk =

City in Altai Krai, Russia

Biysk Бийск
- City
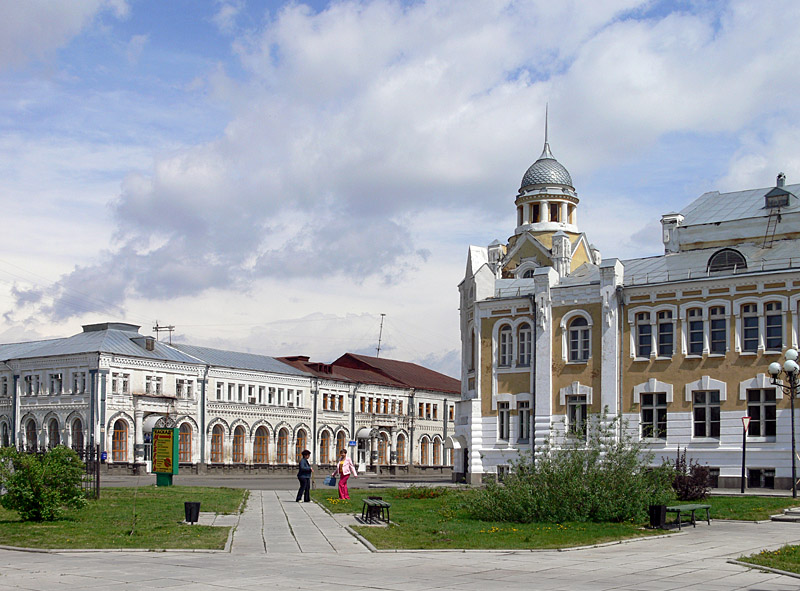
- Sovetskaya Street in Biysk

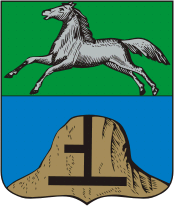
- Coat of arms
- Interactive map of Biysk
- Location of Biysk Biysk (Altai Krai)
- Coordinates: 52°32′N 85°13′E
- Country: Russia
- Federal subject: Altai Krai
- Founded: 1709
- City status since: 1782

Government
  - Body: Duma
  - Head: Victor Schigrev
- Elevation: 180 m (590 ft)

Population (2010 Census)
  - Total: 210,115
  - Estimate (2025): 179,211 (−14.7%)
  - Rank: 89th in 2010

Administrative status
  - Subordinated to: city of krai significance of Biysk
  - Capital of: city of krai significance of Biysk, Biysky District

Municipal status
  - Urban okrug: Biysk Urban Okrug
  - Capital of: Biysk Urban Okrug, Biysky Municipal District
- Time zone: UTC+7 (MSK+4)
- Postal codes: 659300–659306, 659308, 659309, 659311, 659314–659316, 659318–659323, 659325, 659326, 659328–659330, 659332–659336, 659399
- Dialing code: +7 3854
- OKTMO ID: 01705000001
- City Day: June 18
- Website: biysk22.ru

Biysk (Russian: Бийск, IPA: [bʲijsk]; Altay: Јаш-Тура, IPA: [ɟaʃ-tura]) is a city in Altai Krai, Russia, located on the Biya River not far from its confluence with the Katun River. It is the second largest city of the krai (after Barnaul, the administrative center of the krai). Population: 183,852 (2021 census); 210,115 (2010 census); 218,562 (2002 census); 233,238 (1989 Soviet census).

Historical population
Year	Pop.	±%
1897	17,200	—
1926	46,000	+167.4%
1939	80,000	+73.9%
1959	146,416	+83.0%
1970	186,344	+27.3%
1979	211,567	+13.5%
1989	233,238	+10.2%
2002	218,562	−6.3%
2010	210,115	−3.9%
2021	183,852	−12.5%
Source: Census data

== History ==
The fortress of Bikatunskaya (Бикатунская), or Bikatunsky Ostrog (Бикатунский острог), was founded in 1708–1709: it was constructed near the confluence of Biya and Katun Rivers (hence the name) in 1709 by order of Russian tsar Peter the Great, signed in 1708. Yet, in 1710, after a three-day battle, the ostrog (fortress) was destroyed by the Dzungar people. Bikatunsky Ostrog was re-built at a new location (20 kilometers (12 mi) up the Biya, on the right bank of the river) in 1718 and renamed Biyskaya (Бийская) in 1732. Gradually, Biysk lost its role as a military base, but became an important center of trade, and was granted town status in 1782. In 1797, the town was abolished, but in 1804 it was restored as an uyezd town of Tomsk Governorate and granted the coat of arms which is still in use.

== Administrative and municipal status ==
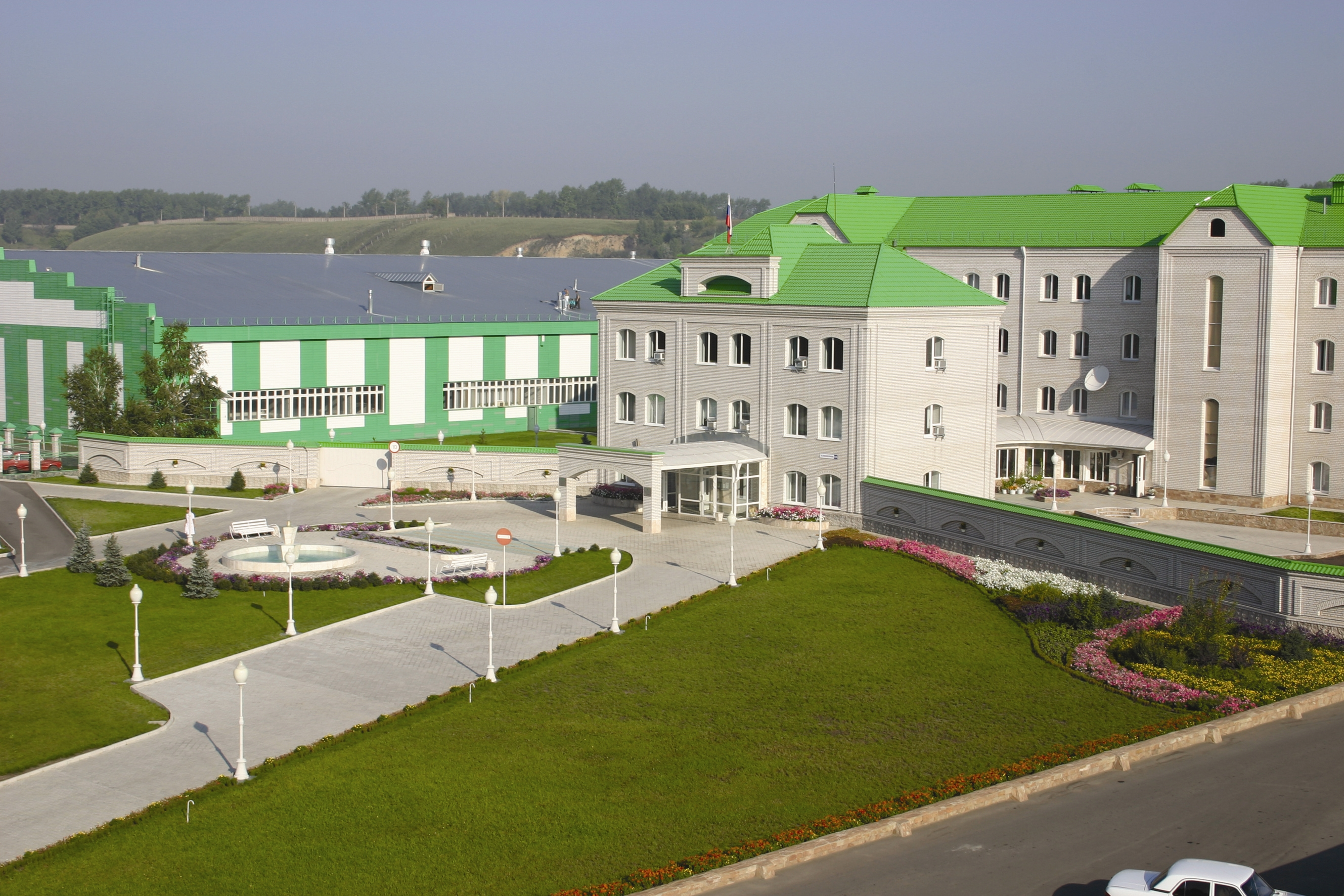
Evalar office building in Biysk

Within the framework of administrative divisions, Biysk serves as the administrative center of Biysky District, even though it is not a part of it. As an administrative division, it is, together with four rural localities, incorporated separately as the city of krai significance of Biysk—an administrative unit with the status equal to that of the districts. As a municipal division, the city of krai significance of Biysk is incorporated as Biysk Urban Okrug.

== Economy ==
The city's industry grew rapidly, especially after some factories were evacuated there from the west of the Soviet Union during World War II. Later the city was an important center of arms development (including solid-fuel rocket engines) and production and still remains an industrial center.

Evalar, one of the largest pharmaceutical companies in Russia, is headquartered in Biysk.

=== Transportation ===
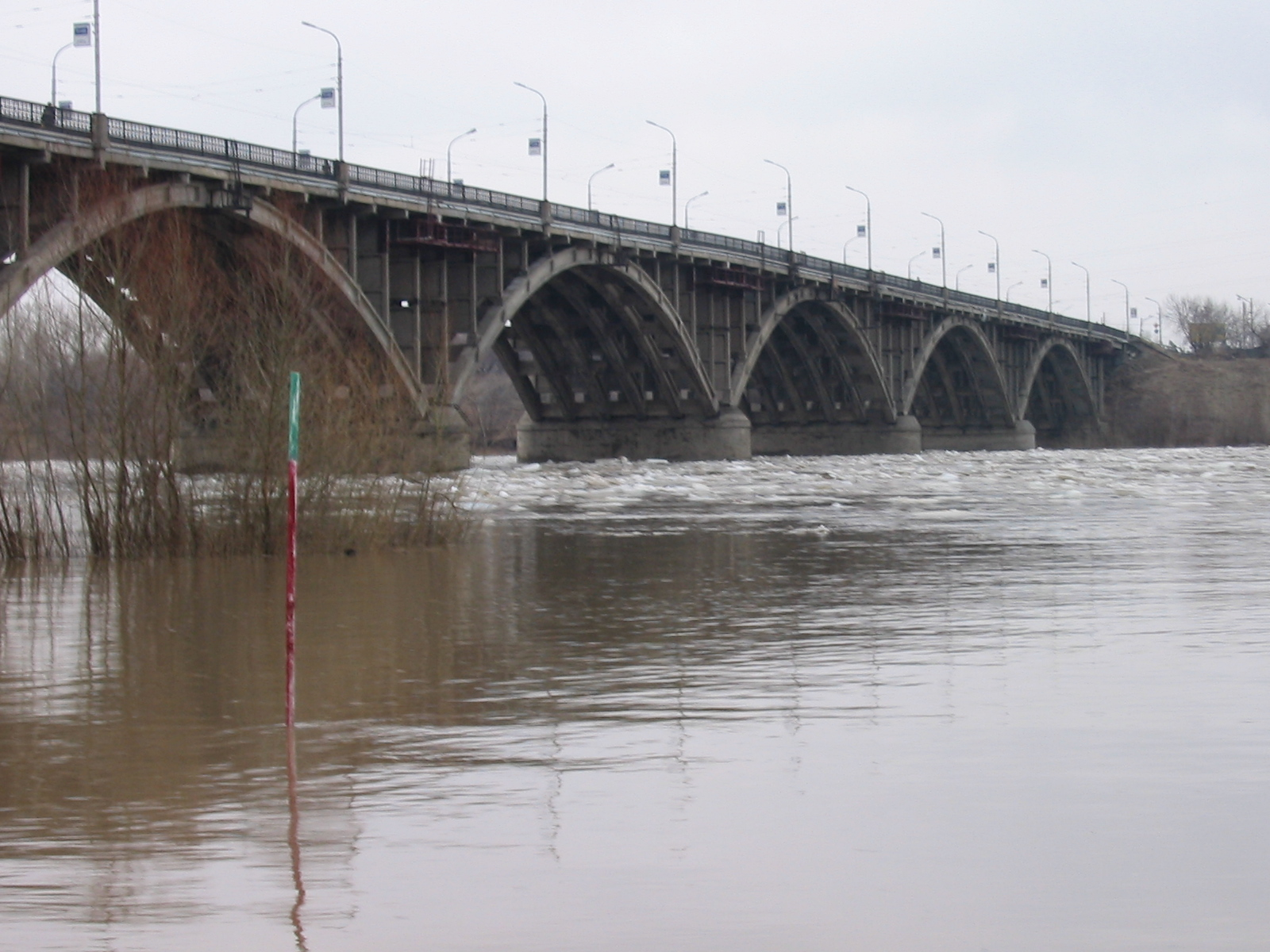
A bridge in Biysk

Biysk has a railway station, a port on the Biya, and is served by the Biysk Airport. The route of federal importance Novosibirsk-Biysk-Tashanta (Chuysky Highway) passes through the city.

== Education and culture ==
Biysk is a center of education and culture, and a home to an academy of education, a technical institute and other educational institutions, a drama theater (founded in 1943), a museum of local lore, and other facilities.

== Geography ==
The city is called "the gates to the Altai Mountains", because of its position comparatively not far from this range. Chuysky Highway begins in Biysk and then goes through the Altai Republic to Russia's border with Mongolia.

=== Climate ===
Biysk has a humid continental climate (Köppen Dfb) with frigid, rather dry winters and very warm, damp summers.

Climate data for Biysk (1991-2020, extremes 1936-present)
Month	Jan	Feb	Mar	Apr	May	Jun	Jul	Aug	Sep	Oct	Nov	Dec	Year
Record high °C (°F)	6.5 (43.7)	9.9 (49.8)	17.4 (63.3)	33.7 (92.7)	36.7 (98.1)	37.2 (99.0)	38.9 (102.0)	38.8 (101.8)	37.0 (98.6)	28.4 (83.1)	19.7 (67.5)	10.8 (51.4)	38.9 (102.0)
Mean daily maximum °C (°F)	−10.7 (12.7)	−7.4 (18.7)	0.4 (32.7)	11.9 (53.4)	20.4 (68.7)	25.1 (77.2)	26.6 (79.9)	25.1 (77.2)	18.3 (64.9)	10.2 (50.4)	−1.4 (29.5)	−8.1 (17.4)	9.2 (48.6)
Daily mean °C (°F)	−16.3 (2.7)	−14.1 (6.6)	−6.1 (21.0)	5.0 (41.0)	12.8 (55.0)	18.2 (64.8)	20.0 (68.0)	17.7 (63.9)	11.1 (52.0)	3.9 (39.0)	−6.1 (21.0)	−13.1 (8.4)	2.8 (36.9)
Mean daily minimum °C (°F)	−21.6 (−6.9)	−19.8 (−3.6)	−11.8 (10.8)	−0.8 (30.6)	5.9 (42.6)	11.7 (53.1)	14.0 (57.2)	11.3 (52.3)	5.3 (41.5)	−0.9 (30.4)	−10.1 (13.8)	−17.9 (−0.2)	−2.9 (26.8)
Record low °C (°F)	−51.8 (−61.2)	−50.6 (−59.1)	−43.1 (−45.6)	−31.5 (−24.7)	−7.8 (18.0)	−1.2 (29.8)	2.0 (35.6)	−2.1 (28.2)	−7.6 (18.3)	−24.1 (−11.4)	−43.9 (−47.0)	−50.5 (−58.9)	−51.8 (−61.2)
Average precipitation mm (inches)	30 (1.2)	24 (0.9)	26 (1.0)	41 (1.6)	57 (2.2)	55 (2.2)	70 (2.8)	53 (2.1)	42 (1.7)	49 (1.9)	53 (2.1)	41 (1.6)	541 (21.3)
Average precipitation days	13.7	10.6	11.3	11.1	12.5	12.3	12.9	12.5	11.4	14.0	15.2	16.2	153.7
Source 1: Pogoda.ru.net
Source 2: climatebase.ru (precipitation days 1936-2012)

== Notable people ==
- Alexander Bessmertnykh (born 1933), Russian diplomat
- Aleksandr Bogatyryov (1963–2009), Kazakhstani football player
- Lev Bogomolets (1911–2009), Soviet Russian painter
- Artyom Fomin (born 1988), Russian footballer
- Konstantin Garbuz (born 1988), Russian footballer
- Sergey Kamenskiy (born 1987), Russian sports shooter
- David Khurtsidze (born 1993), Russian footballer
- Vsevolod Kukushkin (born 1942), Russian journalist, writer and ice hockey administrator
- Ilyas Kurkaev (born 1994), Russian volleyball player
- Aleksandr Lokshin (1920–1987), Russian composer of classical music
