= Petukhovo =

Petukhovo (Russian: Петухово) is a Russian toponym.

== Modern localities ==
Urban localities

- Petukhovo (town), Kurgan Oblast, a town in Petukhovsky District of Kurgan Oblast

Rural localities

- Petukhovo, Arkhangelsk Oblast, a village in Pavlovsky Selsoviet of Vilegodsky District in Arkhangelsk Oblast
- Petukhovo, Ivanovo Oblast, a village in Savinsky District of Ivanovo Oblast
- Petukhovo, Kirov Oblast, a village in Salobelyaksky Rural Okrug of Yaransky District in Kirov Oblast; 57°5′N 48°2′E
- Petukhovo (rural locality), Kurgan Oblast, a selo in Petukhovsky Selsoviet of Petukhovsky District in Kurgan Oblast
- Petukhovo, Mari El Republic, a village in Mikryakovsky Rural Okrug of Gornomariysky District in the Mari El Republic
- Petukhovo, Bor, Nizhny Novgorod Oblast, a village in Kantaurovsky Selsoviet under the administrative jurisdiction of the town of oblast significance of Bor in Nizhny Novgorod Oblast
- Petukhovo, Fedurinsky Selsoviet, Gorodetsky District, Nizhny Novgorod Oblast, a village in Fedurinsky Selsoviet of Gorodetsky District in Nizhny Novgorod Oblast
- Petukhovo, Kovriginsky Selsoviet, Gorodetsky District, Nizhny Novgorod Oblast, a village in Kovriginsky Selsoviet of Gorodetsky District in Nizhny Novgorod Oblast
- Petukhovo, Novgorod Oblast, a village in Peredskoye Settlement of Borovichsky District in Novgorod Oblast
- Petukhovo, Kochyovsky District, Perm Krai, a village in Kochyovsky District of Perm Krai
- Petukhovo, Yusvinsky District, Perm Krai, a village in Yusvinsky District of Perm Krai
- Petukhovo (railway crossing loop), Tomsky District, Tomsk Oblast, a railway crossing loop in Tomsky District of Tomsk Oblast
- Petukhovo (selo), Tomsky District, Tomsk Oblast, a selo in Tomsky District of Tomsk Oblast
- Petukhovo, Tver Oblast, a village in Stoyantsevskoye Rural Settlement of Kimrsky District in Tver Oblast
- Petukhovo, Balezinsky District, Udmurt Republic, a village in Kirshonsky Selsoviet of Balezinsky District in the Udmurt Republic
- Petukhovo, Mozhginsky District, Udmurt Republic, a selo in Pychassky Selsoviet of Mozhginsky District in the Udmurt Republic
- Petukhovo, Vladimir Oblast, a village in Kirzhachsky District of Vladimir Oblast
- Petukhovo, Babushkinsky District, Vologda Oblast, a village in Yurkinsky Selsoviet of Babushkinsky District in Vologda Oblast
- Petukhovo, Totemsky District, Vologda Oblast, a village in Kalininsky Selsoviet of Totemsky District in Vologda Oblast
- Petukhovo, Vashkinsky District, Vologda Oblast, a village in Kisnemsky Selsoviet of Vashkinsky District in Vologda Oblast
- Petukhovo, Danilovsky District, Yaroslavl Oblast, a village in Fedurinsky Rural Okrug of Danilovsky District in Yaroslavl Oblast
- Petukhovo, Pereslavsky District, Yaroslavl Oblast, a village in Zagoryevsky Rural Okrug of Pereslavsky District in Yaroslavl Oblast
- Petukhovo, Uglichsky District, Yaroslavl Oblast, a village in Ilyinsky Rural Okrug of Uglichsky District in Yaroslavl Oblast

== Alternative names ==
- Petukhovo, alternative name of Petukhovy, a village in Karpushinsky Rural Okrug of Kotelnichsky District in Kirov Oblast; 58°21′N 47°57′E
- Petukhovo, alternative name of Petukhi, a selo in Petukhovsky Selsoviet of Klyuchevsky District in Altai Krai; 52°14′N 79°32′E

== Bodies of water ==
- Petukhovo (Petukhi), Altai Krai
- Petukhovo (Severka), Altai Krai, also known as "Petukhovskoe Soda Lake"
- Petukhovo (lake, Kurgan Oblast)

== See also ==
- Petukhovsky (disambiguation)
