= Makarovka =

Makarovka, (Russian: Макаровка) may refer to:

- Makarovka, Fatezhsky District, Kursk Oblast, a village in Kursk Oblast, Russia
- Makarovka, Kurchatovsky District, Kursk Oblast, a village (selo) in Kursk Oblast
- Makarovka, Vladimir Oblast
- Makarovka, Volgograd Oblast
- Makarovka, Altai Krai
- Makarovka, Chekmagushevsky District, Republic of Bashkortostan
- Makarovka, Republic of Mordovia, a village (selo) in the Republic of Mordovia, Russia
