= Istimis =

Istimis Истимис
- Village
- Location within Altai Krai Location within Russia
- Coordinates: 52°22′N 79°17′E
- Country: Russia
- Region: Altai Krai
- District: Klyuchevsky District
- Time zone: UTC+7:00

Istimis (Russian: Истимис) is a rural locality (a selo) and the administrative center of Istimissky Selsoviet of Klyuchevsky District, Altai Krai, Russia. The population was 604 as of 2016. There are 7 streets.

== Geography ==
Istimis lies in the Kulunda Steppe, near lake Krivaya Puchina to the north and lake Shukyrtuz to the southeast. It is located 17 km northeast of Klyuchi (the district's administrative centre) by road. Novopoltava is the nearest rural locality.

== Ethnicity ==
The village is inhabited by Ukrainians and others.
