= Slava, Altai Krai =

Slava Слава
- Selo
- Location within Altai Krai Location within Russia
- Coordinates: 52°23′N 79°33′E
- Country: Russia
- Region: Altai Krai
- District: Klyuchevsky District
- Time zone: UTC+7:00

Slava (Russian: Слава) is a rural locality (a selo) in Zelyonopolyansky Selsoviet, Klyuchevsky District, Altai Krai, Russia, consisting of three streets. The population was 42 as of 2013.

== Geography ==
Slava lies in the Kulunda Steppe, near lake Shukyrtuz to the west and Krivaya Puchina to the northwest. It is located 41 km northeast of Klyuchi (the district's administrative centre) by road. Zelyonaya Polyana is the nearest rural locality.
