= Krasnaya Kurya =

Krasnaya Kurya Красная Курья
- Settlement
- Location within Perm Krai Location within Russia
- Coordinates: 59°31′N 54°36′E
- Country: Russia
- Region: Perm Krai
- District: Kochyovsky District
- Time zone: UTC+5:00

Krasnaya Kurya (Russian: Красная Курья; Komi-Permyak: Гӧрдкурья, Gördkurja) is a rural locality (a settlement) in Kochyovskoye Rural Settlement, Kochyovsky District, Perm Krai, Russia. The population was 92 as of 2010. There are 3 streets.

== Geography ==
Krasnaya Kurya is located 22 km southeast of Kochyovo (the district's administrative centre) by road. Vaskino is the nearest rural locality.
