= Zelyonaya Polyana, Klyuchevsky District, Altai Krai =

Zelyonaya Polyana Зелёная Поляна
- Selo
- Location within Altai Krai Location within Russia
- Coordinates: 52°23′N 79°38′E
- Country: Russia
- Region: Altai Krai
- District: Klyuchevsky District
- Time zone: UTC+7:00

Zelyonaya Polyana (Russian: Зелёная Поляна) is a rural locality (a selo) and the administrative center of Zelyonopolyansky Selsoviet, Klyuchevsky District, Altai Krai, Russia. The population was 429 as of 2013. There are 8 streets.

== Geography ==
Zelyonaya Polyana lies in the Kulunda Steppe, near lake Krivaya Puchina to the WNW and lake Shukyrtuz to the west. It is located 46 km northeast of Klyuchi (the district's administrative centre) by road. Krasny Yar is the nearest rural locality.
