= Demidovka =

Demidovka (Russian: Демидовка) is the name of several inhabited localities in Russia:

- Demidovka, Belgorod Oblast, a village in Krasnoyaruzhsky District in Belgorod Oblast
- Demidovka, Ivanovo Oblast, a hamlet in Yuryevetsky District in Ivanovo Oblast
- Demidovka, Kaliningrad Oblast, an urban-type settlement in Ozyorsky District in Kaliningrad Oblast
- Demidovka, Novosibirsk Oblast, a village in Karasuksky District in Novosibirsk Oblast
- Demidovka, Oryol Oblast, an urban-type settlement in Khotynetsky District in Oryol Oblast
- Demidovka, Perm Krai, a hamlet in Kochyovsky District in Perm Krai
- Demidovka, Rostov Oblast, a khutor in Matveyevo-Kurgansky District in Rostov Oblast
- Demidovka, Samara Oblast, a village in Syzransky District in Samara Oblast
- Demidovka, Smolensk Oblast, a hamlet in Smolensky District in Smolensk Oblast
- Demidovka, Tatarstan, a village in Alkeyevsky District in Tatarstan
- Demidovka, Tver Oblast, a hamlet in Kimrsky District in Tver Oblast
- Demidovka, Tula Oblast, a hamlet in Kireyevsky District in Tula Oblast
