= Vaskino =

Vaskino (Russian: Васькино) is the name of several rural localities in Russia:

- Vaskino, Gaynsky District, Perm Krai, a village in Gaynsky District, Perm Krai
- Vaskino, Kochyovsky District, Perm Krai, a village in Kochyovsky District, Perm Krai
- Vaskino, Mezhdurechensky District, Vologda Oblast, a village in Mezhdurechensky District, Vologda Oblast
