= Markovka =

Markovka Марковка
- Village
- Location within Altai Krai Location within Russia
- Coordinates: 52°25′N 79°46′E
- Country: Russia
- Region: Altai Krai
- District: Klyuchevsky District
- Time zone: UTC+7:00

Markovka (Russian: Марковка) is a rural locality (a selo) and the administrative center of Markovsky Selsoviet of Klyuchevsky District, Altai Krai, Russia. The population was 284 as of 2014. There are 5 streets.

== Geography ==
Markovka lies in the Kulunda Steppe, between lake Koskul to the north and lake Markovskoye to the south. It is located 56 km northeast of Klyuchi (the district's administrative centre) by road. Zelyonaya Polyana is the nearest rural locality.

== Ethnicity ==
The village is inhabited by Ukrainians and others.
