= Urzha =

Urzha Уржа
- Village
- Location within Perm Krai Location within Russia
- Coordinates: 59°30′N 54°27′E
- Country: Russia
- Region: Perm Krai
- District: Kochyovsky District
- Time zone: UTC+5:00

Urzha (Russian: Уржа) is a rural locality (a village) in Kochyovskoye Rural Settlement, Kochyovsky District, Perm Krai, Russia. The population was 24 as of 2010. There is 1 street.

== Geography ==
Urzha is located 20 km southeast of Kochyovo (the district's administrative centre) by road. Salnikovo is the nearest rural locality.
