= Zuyevo =

Zuyevo Зуево
- Village
- Location within Perm Krai Location within Russia
- Coordinates: 59°42′N 54°31′E
- Country: Russia
- Region: Perm Krai
- District: Kochyovsky District
- Time zone: UTC+5:00

Zuyevo (Russian: Зуево) is a rural locality (a village) in Bolshekochinskoye Rural Settlement, Kochyovsky District, Perm Krai, Russia. The population was 36 as of 2010. There are 2 streets.

== Geography ==
Zuyevo is located 26 km northeast of Kochyovo (the district's administrative centre) by road. Borino is the nearest rural locality.
