= Vasilchuki =

Vasilchuki Васильчуки
- Village
- Location within Altai Krai Location within Russia
- Coordinates: 52°16′N 78°57′E
- Country: Russia
- Region: Altai Krai
- District: Klyuchevsky District
- Time zone: UTC+7:00

Vasilchuki (Russian: Васильчуки) is a rural locality (a selo) in Klyuchevsky District, Altai Krai, Russia. The population was 1,154 as of 2016. There are 10 streets.

== Geography ==
Vasilchuki is located 16 km west of Klyuchi (the district's administrative centre) by road. Klyuchi is the nearest rural locality.
