= Parmaylovo =

Parmaylovo Пармайлово
- Village
- Location within Perm Krai Location within Russia
- Coordinates: 59°53′N 54°24′E
- Country: Russia
- Region: Perm Krai
- District: Kochyovsky District
- Time zone: UTC+5:00

Parmaylovo (Russian: Пармайлово; Komi-Permyak: Пармайыл, Parmajyl) is a rural locality (a village) in Yukseyevskoye Rural Settlement, Kochyovsky District, Perm Krai, Russia. The population was 40 as of 2010. There are 3 streets. Parmaylovo is home to an open air Museum of Wooden sculptures created by local artist Yegor Utrobin.

== Geography ==
Parmaylovo is located 36 km north of Kochyovo (the district's administrative centre) by road. Mitino is the nearest rural locality.
