= Shorsha =

Shorsha Шорша
- Village
- Location within Perm Krai Location within Russia
- Coordinates: 59°31′N 54°15′E
- Country: Russia
- Region: Perm Krai
- District: Kochyovsky District
- Time zone: UTC+5:00

Shorsha (Russian: Шорша) is a rural locality (a village) in Kochyovskoye Rural Settlement, Kochyovsky District, Perm Krai, Russia. The population was 39 as of 2010. There are 5 streets.

== Geography ==
Shorsha is located 11 km south of Kochyovo (the district's administrative centre) by road. Durovo is the nearest rural locality.
