= Zapadny Ugol =

Zapadny Ugol Западный Угол
- Selo
- Location within Altai Krai Location within Russia
- Coordinates: 52°07′N 79°34′E
- Country: Russia
- Region: Altai Krai
- District: Klyuchevsky District
- Time zone: UTC+7:00

Zapadny Ugol (Russian: Западный Угол) is a rural locality (a selo) in Petukhovsky Selsoviet, Klyuchevsky District, Altai Krai, Russia. The population was 80 as of 2013. There are 3 streets.

== Geography ==
Zapadny Ugol is located 41 km southeast of Klyuchi (the district's administrative centre) by road. Poluyamki is the nearest rural locality.
