= Makarovka, Altai Krai =

Makarovka Макаровка
- Selo
- Location within Altai Krai Location within Russia
- Coordinates: 52°17′N 79°25′E
- Country: Russia
- Region: Altai Krai
- District: Klyuchevsky District
- Time zone: UTC+7:00

Makarovka (Russian: Макаровка) is a rural locality (a selo) in Novotselinny Selsoviet, Klyuchevsky District, Altai Krai, Russia. The population was 26 as of 2013. There are 6 streets.

== Geography ==
Makarovka lies in the Kulunda Steppe 1 kilometer (0.62 mi) to the northwest of lake Petukhovo and 7 kilometers (4.3 mi)to the south of lake Shukyrtuz. It is located 24 kilometers (15 mi) east of Klyuchi (the district's administrative centre) by road. Petukhi is the nearest rural locality.
