= Ust-Silayka =

Ust-Silayka Усть-Силайка
- Settlement
- Location within Perm Krai Location within Russia
- Coordinates: 59°49′N 54°58′E
- Country: Russia
- Region: Perm Krai
- District: Kochyovsky District
- Time zone: UTC+5:00

Ust-Silayka (Russian: Усть-Силайка) is a rural locality (a settlement) in Yukseyevskoye Rural Settlement, Kochyovsky District, Perm Krai, Russia. The population was 507 as of 2010. There are 7 streets.

== Geography ==
Ust-Silayka is located 45 km northwest of Kochyovo (the district's administrative centre) by road. Serva is the nearest rural locality.
