= Shansherevo =

Shansherevo Шаньшерово
- Village
- Location within Perm Krai Location within Russia
- Coordinates: 59°31′N 54°03′E
- Country: Russia
- Region: Perm Krai
- District: Kochyovsky District
- Time zone: UTC+5:00

Shansherevo (Russian: Шаньшерово; Komi-Permyak: Шаньшор, Šańšor) is a rural locality (a village) in Kochyovskoye Rural Settlement, Kochyovsky District, Perm Krai, Russia. The population was 12 as of 2010. There are 3 streets.

== Geography ==
Shansherevo is located 21 km southwest of Kochyovo (the district's administrative centre) by road. Ust-Yancher is the nearest rural locality.
