= Zapoltsevo =

Zapoltsevo Запольцево
- Village
- Location within Perm Krai Location within Russia
- Coordinates: 59°38′N 54°18′E
- Country: Russia
- Region: Perm Krai
- District: Kochyovsky District
- Time zone: UTC+5:00

Zapoltsevo (Russian: Запольцево) is a rural locality (a village) in Kochyovskoye Rural Settlement, Kochyovsky District, Perm Krai, Russia. The population was 4 as of 2010. There are 2 streets.

== Geography ==
Zapoltsevo is located 6 km north of Kochyovo (the district's administrative centre) by road. Demino is the nearest rural locality.
