= Sizovo =

Sizovo Сизово
- Village
- Location within Perm Krai Location within Russia
- Coordinates: 59°50′N 54°23′E
- Country: Russia
- Region: Perm Krai
- District: Kochyovsky District
- Time zone: UTC+5:00

Sizovo (Russian: Сизово) is a rural locality (a village) in Yukseyevskoye Rural Settlement, Kochyovsky District, Perm Krai, Russia. The population was 10 as of 2010.

== Geography ==
Sizovo is located 30 km north of Kochyovo (the district's administrative centre) by road. Moskvino is the nearest rural locality.
