= Bolshaya Kocha =

Bolshaya Kocha Большая Коча
- Selo
- Location within Perm Krai Location within Russia
- Coordinates: 59°39′N 54°34′E
- Country: Russia
- Region: Perm Krai
- District: Kochyovsky District
- Time zone: UTC+5:00

Bolshaya Kocha (Russian: Большая Коча; Komi-Permyak: Ыджыт Коча, Ydžyt Koća) is a rural locality (a selo) and the administrative center of Bolshekochinskoye Rural Settlement, Kochyovsky District, Perm Krai, Russia. The population was 538 as of 2010. There are 8 streets.

== Geography ==
Bolshaya Kocha is located 18 km northeast of Kochyovo (the district's administrative centre) by road. Abramovka is the nearest rural locality.
