= Lyagayevo =

Lyagayevo Лягаево
- Village
- Location within Perm Krai Location within Russia
- Coordinates: 59°35′N 54°12′E
- Country: Russia
- Region: Perm Krai
- District: Kochyovsky District
- Time zone: UTC+5:00

Lyagayevo (Russian: Лягаево) is a rural locality (a village) in Kochyovskoye Rural Settlement, Kochyovsky District, Perm Krai, Russia. The population was 117 as of 2010. There are 5 streets.

== Geography ==
Lyagayevo is located 7 km west of Kochyovo (the district's administrative centre) by road. Tarasovo is the nearest rural locality.
