= Arkhipovo =

Arkhipovo Архипово
- Village
- Location within Perm Krai Location within Russia
- Coordinates: 59°48′N 54°26′E
- Country: Russia
- Region: Perm Krai
- District: Kochyovsky District
- Time zone: UTC+5:00

Arkhipovo (Russian: Архипово) is a rural locality (a village) in Yukseyevskoye Rural Settlement, Kochyovsky District, Perm Krai, Russia. The population was 7 as of 2010. There are 2 streets.

== Geography ==
Arkhipovo is located 32 km north of Kochyovo (the district's administrative centre) by road. Vershinino is the nearest rural locality.
