= Borino, Perm Krai =

Borino Борино
- Village
- Location within Perm Krai Location within Russia
- Coordinates: 59°42′N 54°30′E
- Country: Russia
- Region: Perm Krai
- District: Kochyovsky District
- Time zone: UTC+5:00

Borino (Russian: Борино) is a rural locality (a village) in Bolshekochinskoye Rural Settlement, Kochyovsky District, Perm Krai, Russia. The population was 155 as of 2010. There are 3 streets.

== Geography ==
Borino is located 25 km northeast of Kochyovo (the district's administrative centre) by road. Zuyevo is the nearest rural locality.
