= Moskvino =

Moskvino Москвино
- Village
- Location within Perm Krai Location within Russia
- Coordinates: 59°49′N 54°23′E
- Country: Russia
- Region: Perm Krai
- District: Kochyovsky District
- Time zone: UTC+5:00

Moskvino (Russian: Москвино) is a rural locality (a village) in Yukseyevskoye Rural Settlement, Kochyovsky District, Perm Krai, Russia. The population was 75 as of 2010. There are 3 streets.

== Geography ==
Moskvino is located 28 km north of Kochyovo (the district's administrative centre) by road. Sizovo is the nearest rural locality.
