= Ust-Yancher =

Ust-Yancher Усть-Янчер
- Settlement
- Location within Perm Krai Location within Russia
- Coordinates: 59°31′N 54°04′E
- Country: Russia
- Region: Perm Krai
- District: Kochyovsky District
- Time zone: UTC+5:00

Ust-Yancher (Russian: Усть-Янчер) is a rural locality (a settlement) in Kochyovskoye Rural Settlement, Kochyovsky District, Perm Krai, Russia. The population was 126 as of 2010. There are 6 streets.

== Geography ==
Ust-Yancher is located 20 km southwest of Kochyovo (the district's administrative centre) by road. Shansherovo is the nearest rural locality.
