= Petukhovsky =

Petukhovsky, Petukhovskaya, or Petukhovskoye may refer to:

- Petukhovsky District, a district of Kurgan Oblast, Russia

== See also ==
- Petukhovsky (rural locality), a list of several rural localities in Russia
- Petukhovo, a list of several inhabited localities in Russia
