= Tashka =

Tashka Ташка
- Village
- Location within Perm Krai Location within Russia
- Coordinates: 59°29′N 54°21′E
- Country: Russia
- Region: Perm Krai
- District: Kochyovsky District
- Time zone: UTC+5:00

Tashka (Russian: Ташка) is a rural locality (a village) in Kochyovskoye Rural Settlement, Kochyovsky District, Perm Krai, Russia. The population was 43 as of 2010. There are 3 streets.

== Geography ==
Tashka is located 26 km south of Kochyovo (the district's administrative centre) by road. Bogolyubovo is the nearest rural locality.
