= Ust-Onolva =

Ust-Onolva Усть-Онолва
- Settlement
- Location within Perm Krai Location within Russia
- Coordinates: 59°36′N 54°48′E
- Country: Russia
- Region: Perm Krai
- District: Kochyovsky District
- Time zone: UTC+5:00

Ust-Onolva (Russian: Усть-Онолва; Komi-Permyak: Усь Онолва, Uś Onolva) is a rural locality (a settlement) in Maratovskoye Rural Settlement, Kochyovsky District, Perm Krai, Russia. The population was 282 as of 2010. There are 5 streets.

== Geography ==
Ust-Onolva is located 39 km east of Kochyovo (the district's administrative centre) by road. Mara-Palnik is the nearest rural locality.
