= Belenkovo =

Belenkovo Беленьково
- Village
- Location within Perm Krai Location within Russia
- Coordinates: 59°40′N 54°24′E
- Country: Russia
- Region: Perm Krai
- District: Kochyovsky District
- Time zone: UTC+5:00

Belenkovo (Russian: Беленьково) is a rural locality (a village) in Bolshekochinskoye Rural Settlement, Kochyovsky District, Perm Krai, Russia. The population was 13 as of 2010. There is 1 street.

== Geography ==
Belenkovo is located 19 km northeast of Kochyovo (the district's administrative centre) by road. Pystogovo is the nearest rural locality.
