= Oy-Pozhum =

Oy-Pozhum Ой-Пожум
- Village
- Location within Perm Krai Location within Russia
- Coordinates: 59°36′N 54°10′E
- Country: Russia
- Region: Perm Krai
- District: Kochyovsky District
- Time zone: UTC+5:00

Oy-Pozhum (Russian: Ой-Пожум; Komi-Permyak: Ой Пожым, Oj Požym) is a rural locality (a village) in Kochyovskoye Rural Settlement, Kochyovsky District, Perm Krai, Russia. The population was 39 as of 2010. There are 6 streets.

== Geography ==
Oy-Pozhum is located 12 km northwest of Kochyovo (the district's administrative centre) by road. Lyagayevo is the nearest rural locality.
