= Tubyzovo =

Tubyzovo Тубызово
- Village
- Location within Perm Krai Location within Russia
- Coordinates: 59°42′N 54°15′E
- Country: Russia
- Region: Perm Krai
- District: Kochyovsky District
- Time zone: UTC+5:00

Tubyzovo (Russian: Тубызово) is a rural locality (a village) in Pelymskoye Rural Settlement, Kochyovsky District, Perm Krai, Russia. The population was 8 as of 2010. There is 1 street.

== Geography ==
Tubyzovo is located 16 km north of Kochyovo (the district's administrative centre) by road. Zyryanovo is the nearest rural locality.
