= Gaintsevo =

Gaintsevo Гаинцево
- Village
- Location within Perm Krai Location within Russia
- Coordinates: 59°32′N 54°10′E
- Country: Russia
- Region: Perm Krai
- District: Kochyovsky District
- Time zone: UTC+5:00

Gaintsevo (Russian: Гаинцево; Komi-Permyak: Гаинчи, Gainći) is a rural locality (a village) in Kochyovskoye Rural Settlement, Kochyovsky District, Perm Krai, Russia. The population was 10 as of 2010. There are 3 streets.

== Geography ==
Gaintsevo is located 14 km southwest of Kochyovo (the district's administrative centre) by road. Petrushino is the nearest rural locality.
