= Proshino =

Proshino Прошино
- Village
- Location within Perm Krai Location within Russia
- Coordinates: 59°41′N 54°11′E
- Country: Russia
- Region: Perm Krai
- District: Kochyovsky District
- Time zone: UTC+5:00

Proshino (Russian: Прошино) is a rural locality (a village) in Pelymskoye Rural Settlement, Kochyovsky District, Perm Krai, Russia. The population was 3 as of 2010. There are 3 streets.

== Geography ==
Proshino is located 16 km north of Kochyovo (the district's administrative centre) by road.
