= Vezhayka =

Vezhayka (Russian: Вежайка) is the name of several rural localities in Russia:

- Vezhayka, Kochyovsky District, Perm Krai, a village in Kochyovsky District, Perm Krai
- Vezhayka, Kudymkarsky District, Perm Krai, a village in Kudymkarsky District, Perm Krai
