= Gordeyevo =

Gordeyevo Гордеево
- Village
- Location within Perm Krai Location within Russia
- Coordinates: 59°40′N 54°13′E
- Country: Russia
- Region: Perm Krai
- District: Kochyovsky District
- Time zone: UTC+5:00

Gordeyevo (Russian: Гордеево) is a rural locality (a village) in Pelymskoye Rural Settlement, Kochyovsky District, Perm Krai, Russia. The population was 3 as of 2010. There are 3 streets.

== Geography ==
Gordeyevo is located 21 km northwest of Kochyovo (the district's administrative centre) by road. Zyryanovo is the nearest rural locality.
