= Serva =

Serva Серва
- Settlement
- Location within Perm Krai Location within Russia
- Coordinates: 59°53′N 54°31′E
- Country: Russia
- Region: Perm Krai
- District: Kochyovsky District
- Time zone: UTC+5:00

Serva (Russian: Серва) is a rural locality (a settlement) in Yukseyevskoye Rural Settlement, Kochyovsky District, Perm Krai, Russia. The population was 260 as of 2010. There are 6 streets.

== Geography ==
Serva is located 41 km north of Kochyovo (the district's administrative centre) by road. Yukseyevo is the nearest rural locality.
