= Akilovo =

Akilovo Акилово
- Settlement
- Location within Perm Krai Location within Russia
- Coordinates: 59°37′N 53°57′E
- Country: Russia
- Region: Perm Krai
- District: Kochyovsky District
- Time zone: UTC+5:00

Akilovo (Russian: Акилово) is a rural locality (a settlement) in Kochyovskoye Rural Settlement, Kochyovsky District, Perm Krai, Russia. The population was 259 as of 2010. There are 5 streets.

== Geography ==
Akilovo is located 25 km northwest of Kochyovo (the district's administrative centre) by road. Vorobyovo is the nearest rural locality.
