= Yukseyevo =

Yukseyevo Юксеево
- Selo
- Location within Perm Krai Location within Russia
- Coordinates: 59°52′03″N 54°19′31″E
- Country: Russia
- Region: Perm Krai
- District: Kochyovsky District
- Time zone: UTC+5:00

Yukseyevo (Russian: Юксеево) is a rural locality (a selo) and the administrative center of Yukseyevskoye Rural Settlement, Kochyovsky District, Perm Krai, Russia. The population was 459 as of 2010. There are 13 streets.

== Geography ==
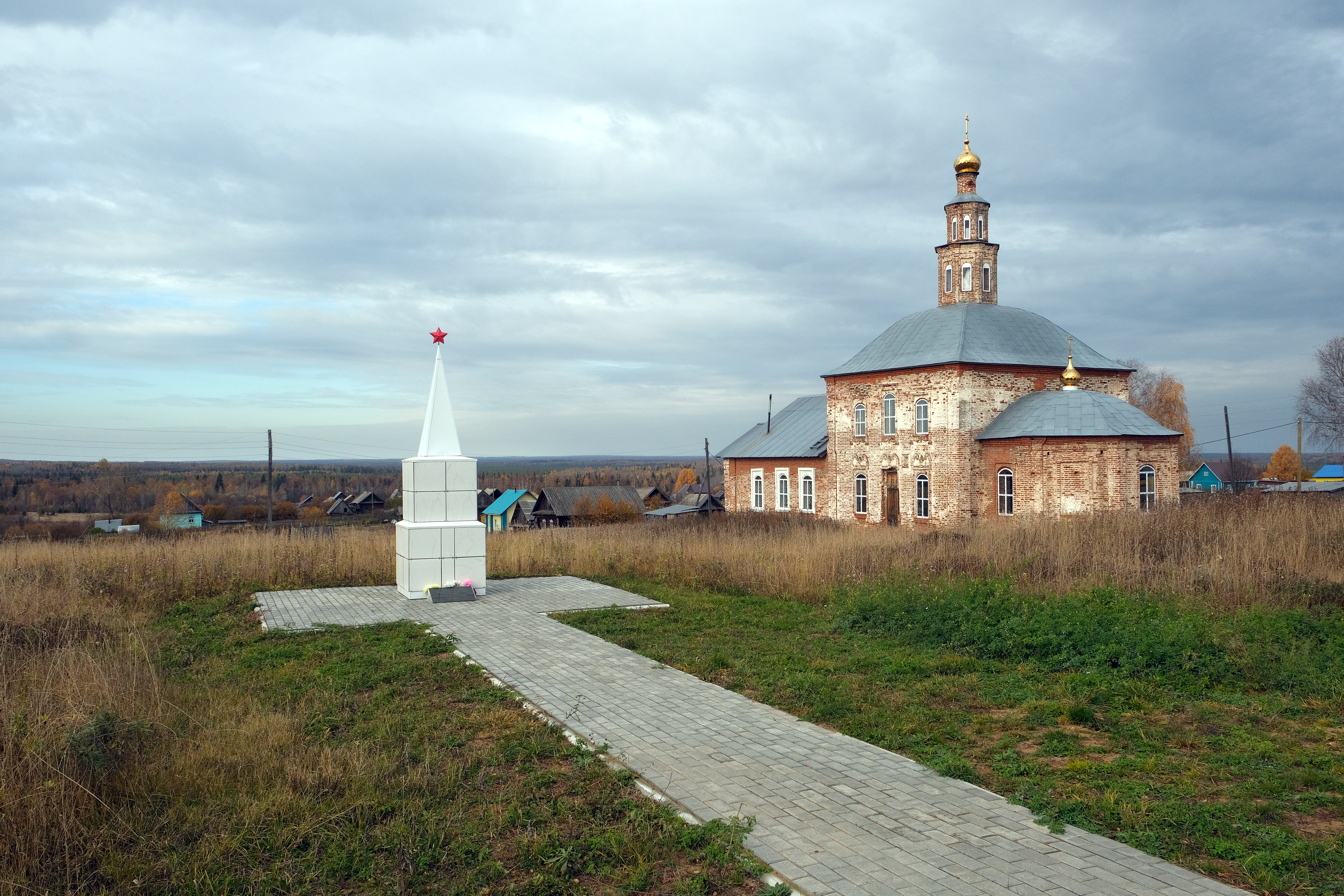

Yukseyevo is located 32 km north of Kochyovo (the district's administrative centre) by road. Mitino is the nearest rural locality.
