= Otopkovo =

Otopkovo Отопково
- Village
- Location within Perm Krai Location within Russia
- Coordinates: 59°45′N 54°24′E
- Country: Russia
- Region: Perm Krai
- District: Kochyovsky District
- Time zone: UTC+5:00

Otopkovo (Russian: Отопково; Komi-Permyak: Ӧтӧпка, Ötöpka) is a rural locality (a village) in Pelymskoye Rural Settlement, Kochyovsky District, Perm Krai, Russia. The population was 108 as of 2010. There are 3 streets.

== Geography ==
Otopkovo is located 20 km north of Kochyovo (the district's administrative centre) by road. Pelym is the nearest rural locality.
