= Sepol =

Sepol Сеполь
- Village
- Location within Perm Krai Location within Russia
- Coordinates: 59°32′N 54°29′E
- Country: Russia
- Region: Perm Krai
- District: Kochyovsky District
- Time zone: UTC+5:00

Sepol (Russian: Сеполь; Komi-Permyak: Сэпӧль, Sepöľ) is a rural locality (a village) in Kochyovskoye Rural Settlement, Kochyovsky District, Perm Krai, Russia. The population was 407 as of 2010. There are 11 streets.

== Geography ==
Sepol is located 14 km southeast of Kochyovo (the district's administrative centre) by road. Slepoyevo is the nearest rural locality.
