= Puzym =

Puzym Пузым
- Village
- Location within Perm Krai Location within Russia
- Coordinates: 59°40′N 54°40′E
- Country: Russia
- Region: Perm Krai
- District: Kochyovsky District
- Time zone: UTC+5:00

Puzym (Russian: Пузым) is a rural locality (a village) in Bolshekochinskoye Rural Settlement, Kochyovsky District, Perm Krai, Russia. The population was 4 as of 2010. There is 1 street.

== Geography ==
Puzym is located 16 km north of Kochyovo (the district's administrative centre) by road. Kuzmino is the nearest rural locality.
