= Bolshoy Palnik =

Bolshoy Palnik Большой Пальник
- Village
- Location within Perm Krai Location within Russia
- Coordinates: 59°38′N 54°28′E
- Country: Russia
- Region: Perm Krai
- District: Kochyovsky District
- Time zone: UTC+5:00

Bolshoy Palnik (Russian: Большой Пальник, Komi-Permyak: Ыджыт Пальник, Ydžyt Paľnik) is a rural locality (a village) in Bolshekochinskoye Rural Settlement, Kochyovsky District, Perm Krai, Russia. The population was 37 as of 2010. There is 1 street.

== Geography ==
Bolshoy Palnik is located 13 km northeast of Kochyovo (the district's administrative centre) by road. Vezhayka is the nearest rural locality.
