= Khazovo =

Khazovo Хазово
- Village
- Location within Perm Krai Location within Russia
- Coordinates: 59°32′N 54°14′E
- Country: Russia
- Region: Perm Krai
- District: Kochyovsky District
- Time zone: UTC+5:00

Khazovo (Russian: Хазово; Komi-Permyak: Каз, Kaz) is a rural locality (a village) in Kochyovskoye Rural Settlement, Kochyovsky District, Perm Krai, Russia. The population was 90 as of 2010. There are 4 streets.

== Geography ==
Khazovo is located 9 km southwest of Kochyovo (the district's administrative centre) by road. Durovo is the nearest rural locality.
