= Novovoznesenka =

Novovoznesenka Нововознесенка
- Selo
- Location within Altai Krai Location within Russia
- Coordinates: 52°11′N 79°11′E
- Country: Russia
- Region: Altai Krai
- District: Klyuchevsky District
- Time zone: UTC+7:00

Novovoznesenka (Russian: Нововознесенка) is a rural locality (a selo) in Klyuchevsky Selsoviet, Klyuchevsky District, Altai Krai, Russia. The population was 168 as of 2013. There are 5 streets.

== Geography ==
Novovoznesenka is located 8 km southeast of Klyuchi (the district's administrative centre) by road. Klyuchi is the nearest rural locality.
