= Krasny Yar, Klyuchevsky District, Altai Krai =

Krasny Yar Красный Яр
- Selo
- Location within Altai Krai Location within Russia
- Coordinates: 52°27′N 79°36′E
- Country: Russia
- Region: Altai Krai
- District: Klyuchevsky District
- Time zone: UTC+7:00

Krasny Yar (Russian: Красный Яр) is a rural locality (a selo) in Zelyonopolyansky Selsoviet, Klyuchevsky District, Altai Krai, Russia. The population was 126 as of 2013. There are 2 streets.

== Geography ==
Krasny Yar lies in the Kulunda Steppe, near lake Krivaya Puchina to the west and lake Shukyrtuz to the southwest.
