= Zyryanovo =

Zyryanovo Зыряново
- Village
- Location within Perm Krai Location within Russia
- Coordinates: 59°41′N 54°12′E
- Country: Russia
- Region: Perm Krai
- District: Kochyovsky District
- Time zone: UTC+5:00

Zyryanovo (Russian: Зыряново) is a rural locality (a village) in Pelymskoye Rural Settlement, Kochyovsky District, Perm Krai, Russia. The population was 131 as of 2010. There are 4 streets.

== Geography ==
Zyryanovo is located 18 km northwest of Kochyovo (the district's administrative centre) by road. Proshino is the nearest rural locality.
