= Buzhdym =

Buzhdym Буждым
- Settlement
- Location within Perm Krai Location within Russia
- Coordinates: 59°39′N 54°52′E
- Country: Russia
- Region: Perm Krai
- District: Kochyovsky District
- Time zone: UTC+5:00

Buzhdym (Russian: Буждым) is a rural locality (a settlement) in Maratovskoye Rural Settlement, Kochyovsky District, Perm Krai, Russia. The population was 199 as of 2010. There are 5 streets.

== Geography ==
Buzhdym is located 44 km east of Kochyovo (the district's administrative centre) by road. Maraty is the nearest rural locality.
