= Maraty =

Maraty Мараты
- Settlement
- Location within Perm Krai Location within Russia
- Coordinates: 59°41′N 54°55′E
- Country: Russia
- Region: Perm Krai
- District: Kochyovsky District
- Time zone: UTC+5:00

Maraty (Russian: Мараты) is a rural locality (a settlement) and the administrative center of Maratovskoye Rural Settlement, Kochyovsky District, Perm Krai, Russia. The population was 504 as of 2010. There are 15 streets.

== Geography ==
Maraty is located 50 km east of Kochyovo (the district's administrative centre) by road. Buzhdym is the nearest rural locality.
