= Petrushino =

Petrushino Петрушино
- Village
- Location within Perm Krai Location within Russia
- Coordinates: 59°32′N 54°12′E
- Country: Russia
- Region: Perm Krai
- District: Kochyovsky District
- Time zone: UTC+5:00

Petrushino (Russian: Петрушино) is a rural locality (a village) in Kochyovskoye Rural Settlement, Kochyovsky District, Perm Krai, Russia. The population was 6 as of 2010. There is 1 street.

== Geography ==
Petrushino is located 11 km southwest of Kochyovo (the district's administrative centre) by road. Lobozovo is the nearest rural locality.
