= Platovka =

Platovka Платовка
- Selo
- Location within Altai Krai Location within Russia
- Coordinates: 52°21′N 79°03′E
- Country: Russia
- Region: Altai Krai
- District: Klyuchevsky District
- Time zone: UTC+7:00

Platovka (Russian: Платовка) is a rural locality (a selo) in Klyuchevsky Selsoviet, Klyuchevsky District, Altai Krai, Russia. The population was 269 as of 2013. There are 3 streets.

== Geography ==
Platovka is located 17 km north of Klyuchi (the district's administrative centre) by road. Tselinny and Klyuchi are the nearest rural localities.
