= Pystogovo =

Pystogovo Пыстогово
- Village
- Location within Perm Krai Location within Russia
- Coordinates: 59°40′N 54°25′E
- Country: Russia
- Region: Perm Krai
- District: Kochyovsky District
- Time zone: UTC+5:00

Pystogovo (Russian: Пыстогово) is a rural locality (a village) in Bolshekochinskoye Rural Settlement, Kochyovsky District, Perm Krai, Russia. The population was 80 as of 2010. There are 3 streets.

== Geography ==
Pystogovo is located 18 km northeast of Kochyovo (the district's administrative centre) by road. Maskal is the nearest rural locality.
