= Syulkovo =

Syulkovo Сюльково
- Village
- Location within Perm Krai Location within Russia
- Coordinates: 59°35′N 54°32′E
- Country: Russia
- Region: Perm Krai
- District: Kochyovsky District
- Time zone: UTC+5:00

Syulkovo (Russian: Сюльково) is a rural locality (a village) in Kochyovskoye Rural Settlement, Kochyovsky District, Perm Krai, Russia. The population was 22 as of 2010. There are 3 streets.

== Geography ==
Syulkovo is located 20 km east of Kochyovo (the district's administrative centre) by road. Slepoyevo is the nearest rural locality.
