= Mara-Palnik =

Mara-Palnik Мара-Пальник
- Village
- Location within Perm Krai Location within Russia
- Coordinates: 59°39′N 54°44′E
- Country: Russia
- Region: Perm Krai
- District: Kochyovsky District
- Time zone: UTC+5:00

Mara-Palnik (Russian: Мара-Пальник) is a rural locality (a village) in Bolshekochinskoye Rural Settlement, Kochyovsky District, Perm Krai, Russia. The population was 95 as of 2010. There are 4 streets.

== Geography ==
Mara-Palnik is located 32 km east of Kochyovo (the district's administrative centre) by road. Puzym is the nearest rural locality.
