= Palkoyag =

Palkoyag Палькояг
- Village
- Location within Perm Krai Location within Russia
- Coordinates: 59°35′N 54°22′E
- Country: Russia
- Region: Perm Krai
- District: Kochyovsky District
- Time zone: UTC+5:00

Palkoyag (Russian: Палькояг) is a rural locality (a village) in Kochyovskoye Rural Settlement, Kochyovsky District, Perm Krai, Russia. The population was 36 as of 2010. There are 5 streets.

== Geography ==
Palkoyag is located 5 km east of Kochyovo (the district's administrative centre) by road. Kochyovo is the nearest rural locality.
