= Petukhovo (Severka) =

Salt lake in Altai Krai, Russia

- Петухово
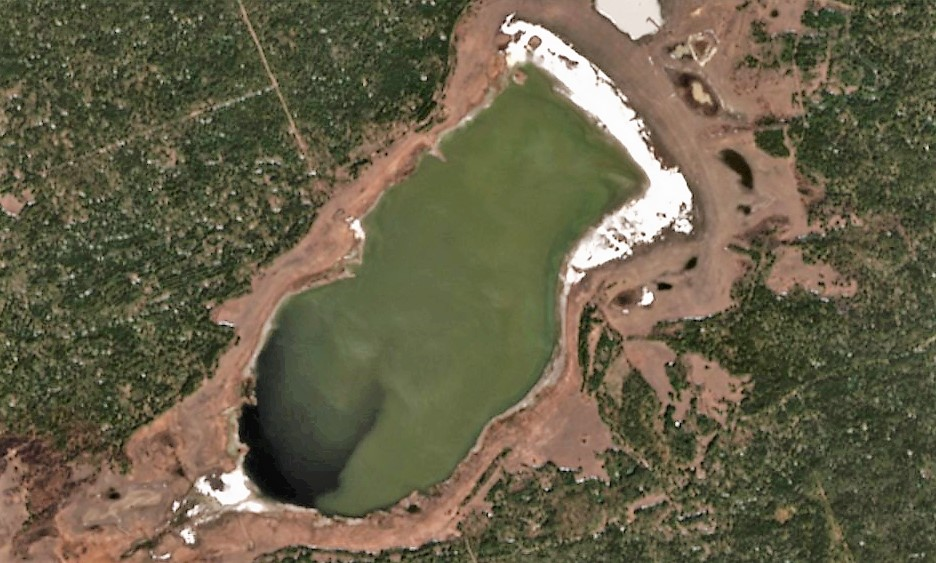
- Sentinel-2 image of the lake.

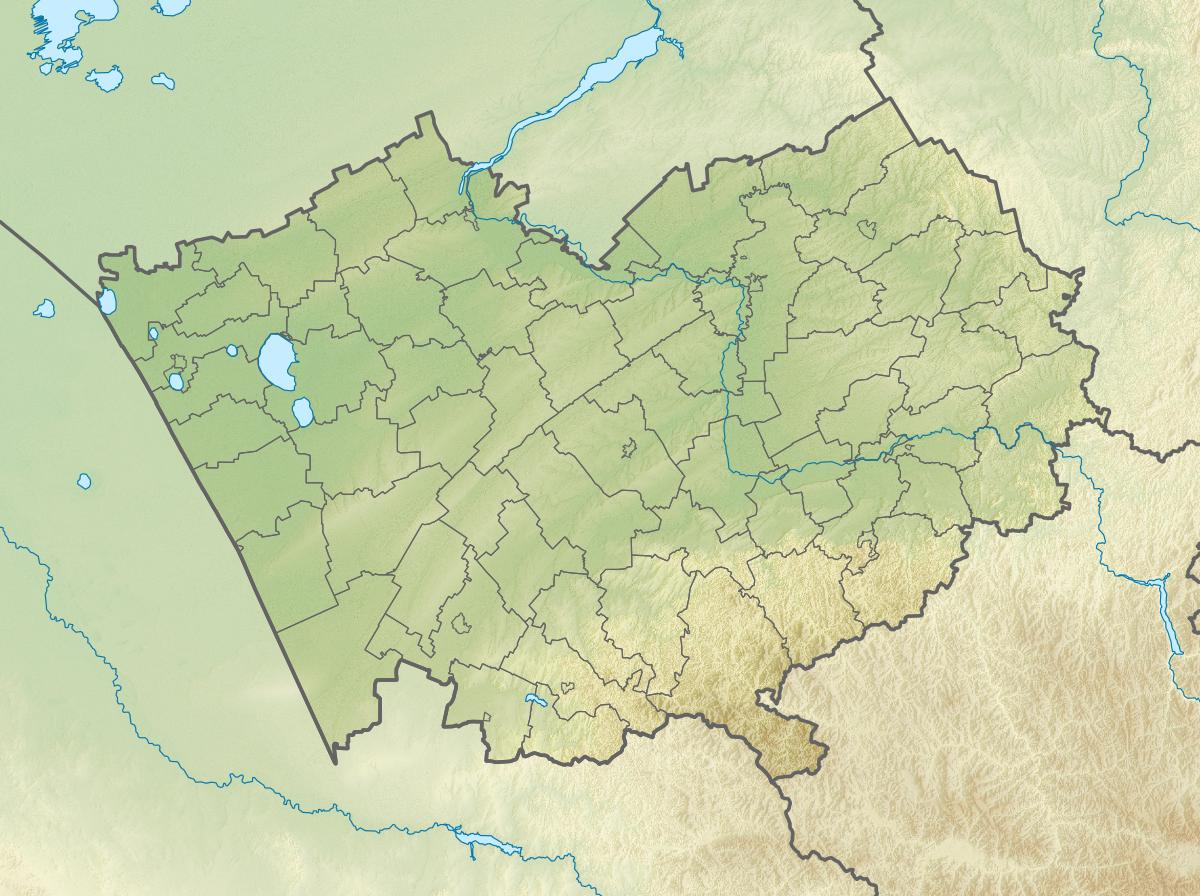
- Location within Altai Krai Location within Russia
- Location: Kulunda Steppe; West Siberian Plain
- Coordinates: 52°06′25″N 79°09′35″E
- Type: endorheic
- Basin countries: Russia
- Max. length: 3.2 kilometers (2.0 mi)
- Max. width: 1.4 kilometers (0.87 mi)
- Surface area: 5.5 square kilometers (2.1 sq mi)
- Average depth: 1.2 meters (3 ft 11 in)
- Residence time: UTC+6
- Surface elevation: 145.7 meters (478 ft)
- Settlements: Severka

Petukhovo (Russian: Петухово), also known as Petukhovskoye Soda Lake (Russian: Петуховское содовое озеро), is an alkaline lake in Klyuchevsky District, Altai Krai, Russian Federation.

The lake is located at the western edge of the Krai, only 7 kilometers (4.3 mi) east of the Russia-Kazakhstan border. The nearest inhabited place is Severka 5 kilometers (3.1 mi) to the east of the eastern end. Klyuchi, the district capital, lies 13 kilometers (8.1 mi) to the north.

In 1998 the lake was declared a natural monument of regional significance. Petukhovo is a soda lake and there was a soda plant operating near it that had been extracting raw material from it since 1921. The company was liquidated in 2006.

== Geography ==
Located in the Kulunda Plain, Petukhovo has an elongated shape, stretching roughly from northeast to southwest for approximately 3 kilometers (1.9 mi). The lake dries during summers of drought, becoming a salt pan. Salt was mined in the lake in the past. The indicator minerals in the sediments of the lake are pyrite, disordered Ca-smectites, and dolomite, the latter being markedly predominant, especially in the lower part of the sediment section. The water has a mineralization of 24.3 grams per liter (3.90 oz/imp gal) and a pH of 9.8.

Metagenomic analyses of lake samples collected in July 2016 indicate the presence of archaea belonging to the Lokiarchaeota group (MAG: Ca. Lokiarchaeota archaeon isolate CSSed165cm_327R1) among other microbes.

Lake Gornostalevo lies 17 kilometers (11 mi) to the south and Kurichye 21 kilometers (13 mi) to the ENE. 24 kilometers (15 mi) to the northeast lies lake Petukhovo, near Petukhi.

== Flora and fauna ==
The lake is surrounded by forest steppe. There are also sand dunes.

== See also ==
- List of lakes of Russia
