= Kaip =

Kaip (Russian: Каип) is the name of several rural localities in Russia:

- Kaip, Altai Krai, a selo in Kaipsky Selsoviet of Klyuchevsky District in Altai Krai; 52°15′N 79°47′E
- Kaip, Kemerovo Oblast, a village in Poperechenskaya Rural Territory of Yurginsky District in Kemerovo Oblast; 55°32′N 84°57′E
