= Mitino, Perm Krai =

Mitino Митино
- Village
- Location within Perm Krai Location within Russia
- Coordinates: 59°52′N 54°22′E
- Country: Russia
- Region: Perm Krai
- District: Kochyovsky District
- Time zone: UTC+5:00

Mitino (Russian: Митино) is a rural locality (a village) in Yukseyevskoye Rural Settlement, Kochyovsky District, Perm Krai, Russia. The population was 168 as of 2010. There are 3 streets.

== Geography ==
Mitino is located 34 km north of Kochyovo (the district's administrative centre) by road. Yukseyevo is the nearest rural locality.
