= Petrovka, Klyuchevsky District, Altai Krai =

Petrovka Петровка
- Selo
- Location within Altai Krai Location within Russia
- Coordinates: 52°27′N 79°19′E
- Country: Russia
- Region: Altai Krai
- District: Klyuchevsky District
- Time zone: UTC+7:00

Petrovka (Russian: Петровка) is a rural locality (a selo) in Novopoltavsky Selsoviet, Klyuchevsky District, Altai Krai, Russia. The population was 132 as of 2013. There are 6 streets.

== Geography ==
Petrovka lies in the Kulunda Steppe, near lake Krivaya Puchina to the east. It is located 28 km north of Klyuchi (the district's administrative centre) by road. Novopoltava is the nearest rural locality.
