= Urya, Perm Krai =

Urya Урья
- Village
- Location within Perm Krai Location within Russia
- Coordinates: 59°42′N 54°28′E
- Country: Russia
- Region: Perm Krai
- District: Kochyovsky District
- Time zone: UTC+5:00

Urya (Russian: Урья; Komi-Permyak: Урьюгорт, Urjugort) is a rural locality (a village) in Bolshekochinskoye Rural Settlement, Kochyovsky District, Perm Krai, Russia. The population was 31 as of 2010. There are 2 streets.

== Geography ==
Urya is located 27 km northeast of Kochyovo (the district's administrative centre) by road. Borino is the nearest rural locality.
