= Bazhovo =

Bazhovo Бажово
- Village
- Location within Perm Krai Location within Russia
- Coordinates: 59°50′N 54°24′E
- Country: Russia
- Region: Perm Krai
- District: Kochyovsky District
- Time zone: UTC+5:00

Bazhovo (Russian: Бажово) is a rural locality (a village) in Yukseyevskoye Rural Settlement, Kochyovsky District, Perm Krai, Russia. The population was 35 as of 2010. There are 3 streets.

== Geography ==
Bazhovo is located 31 km north of Kochyovo (the district's administrative centre) by road. Sizovo is the nearest rural locality.
