= Vezhayka, Kochyovsky District, Perm Krai =

Vezhayka Вежайка
- Village
- Location within Perm Krai Location within Russia
- Coordinates: 59°37′N 54°31′E
- Country: Russia
- Region: Perm Krai
- District: Kochyovsky District
- Time zone: UTC+5:00

Vezhayka (Russian: Вежайка) is a rural locality (a village) in Bolshekochinskoye Rural Settlement, Kochyovsky District, Perm Krai, Russia. The population was 4 as of 2010. There is 1 street.

== Geography ==
Vezhayka is located 19 km northeast of Kochyovo (the district's administrative centre) by road. Oshovo is the nearest rural locality.
