= Petukhovo, Kochyovsky District, Perm Krai =

Petukhovo Петухово
- Village
- Location within Perm Krai Location within Russia
- Coordinates: 59°41′N 54°20′E
- Country: Russia
- Region: Perm Krai
- District: Kochyovsky District
- Time zone: UTC+5:00

Petukhovo (Russian: Петухово) is a rural locality (a village) in Pelymskoye Rural Settlement, Kochyovsky District, Perm Krai, Russia. The population was 89 as of 2010. There are 4 streets.

== Geography ==
Petukhovo is located 11 km north of Kochyovo (the district's administrative centre) by road. Kuzmino is the nearest rural locality.
