= Slavsky =

Slavsky (masculine), Slavskaya (feminine), or Slavskoye (neuter) may refer to:

- Slavsky District, a district of Kaliningrad Oblast, Russia
- Slavskoye Urban Settlement, a municipal formation which the town of district significance of Slavsk in Slavsky District of Kaliningrad Oblast, Russia is incorporated as
- Slavskoye, Russia, a rural locality (a settlement) in Kaliningrad Oblast, Russia
- Slavske (Slavskoye), an urban-type settlement in Ukraine
- Efim P. Slavsky, a Soviet statesman and engineer

== See also ==
- Slava (disambiguation)
