= Kukushka =

Kukushka (Russian meaning "little cuckoo") may refer to:

- The Cuckoo (film), a 2002 Russian film
- Borjomi–Bakuriani railway, nicknamed the Kukushka, a railway line in Georgia
- Kukushka, Perm Krai, a town in Perm, Russia
