= Petukhovo (lake, Kurgan Oblast) =

- Петухово (Russian)
- Interactive map of Petukhovo
- Location: Petukhovsky District, Kurgan Oblast, Russia
- Coordinates: 55°6′37″N 67°57′26″E
- Surface area: 1.2 square kilometres (0.46 sq mi)
- Max. depth: 1.6 metres (5 ft 3 in)
- Surface elevation: 127 metres (417 ft)
- Settlements: Petukhovo

Petukhovo (Russian: Петухово) is a lake in Petukhovsky District, Kurgan Oblast, Russia.

The surface area of the lake is 1.2 square kilometres (0.46 sq mi). The depth is 1.6 metres (5 ft 3 in).

== Geography ==
Petukhovo is a lake located 127 metres (417 ft) above sea level in the Ishim Plain, the southern part of the West Siberian Plain. There is a settlement by the lake – selo Petukhovo located to the northwest of the town of Petukhovo. The lake is located within the protected area Petukhovsky Zoological Zakaznik along with the larger lake Medvezhye to the north.
