= Slepoyevo =

Slepoyevo Слепоево
- Village
- Location within Perm Krai Location within Russia
- Coordinates: 59°33′N 54°29′E
- Country: Russia
- Region: Perm Krai
- District: Kochyovsky District
- Time zone: UTC+5:00

Slepoyevo (Russian: Слепоево) is a rural locality (a village) in Kochyovskoye Rural Settlement, Kochyovsky District, Perm Krai, Russia. The population was 44 as of 2010. There are 2 streets.

== Geography ==
Slepoyevo is located 17 km southeast of Kochyovo (the district's administrative centre) by road. Sepol is the nearest rural locality.
