= Demidovka, Perm Krai =

Demidovka Демидовка
- Village
- Location within Perm Krai Location within Russia
- Coordinates: 59°43′N 54°37′E
- Country: Russia
- Region: Perm Krai
- District: Kochyovsky District
- Time zone: UTC+5:00

Demidovka (Russian: Демидовка) is a rural locality (a village) in Bolshekochinskoye Rural Settlement, Kochyovsky District, Perm Krai, Russia. The population was 5 as of 2010. There is 1 street.

== Geography ==
Demidovka is located 28 km northeast of Kochyovo (the district's administrative centre) by road. Abramovka is the nearest rural locality.
