= Vaskino, Kochyovsky District, Perm Krai =

Vaskino Васькино
- Village
- Location within Perm Krai Location within Russia
- Coordinates: 59°32′N 54°32′E
- Country: Russia
- Region: Perm Krai
- District: Kochyovsky District
- Time zone: UTC+5:00

Vaskino (Russian: Васькино) is a rural locality (a village) in Kochyovskoye Rural Settlement, Kochyovsky District, Perm Krai, Russia. The population was 22 as of 2010. There are 3 streets.

== Geography ==
Vaskino is located 17 km southeast of Kochyovo (the district's administrative centre) by road. Sepol is the nearest rural locality.
