= Novopoltava =

Novopoltava Новополтава
- Selo
- Location within Altai Krai Location within Russia
- Coordinates: 52°24′N 79°20′E
- Country: Russia
- Region: Altai Krai
- District: Klyuchevsky District
- Time zone: UTC+7:00

Novopoltava (Russian: Новополтава) is a rural locality (a selo) and the administrative center of Novopoltavsky Selsoviet, Klyuchevsky District, Altai Krai, Russia. The population was 810 as of 2013. There are 9 streets.

== Geography ==
Novopoltava lies in the Kulunda Steppe, between lake Krivaya Puchina to the north and lake Shukyrtuz to the southeast. It is located 23 km northeast of Klyuchi (the district's administrative centre) by road. Petrovka is the nearest rural locality.
