= Kukushka, Perm Krai =

Kukushka Кукушка
- Village
- Location within Perm Krai Location within Russia
- Coordinates: 59°32′N 54°24′E
- Country: Russia
- Region: Perm Krai
- District: Kochyovsky District
- Time zone: UTC+5:00

Kukushka (Russian: Кукушка) is a rural locality (a village) in Kochyovskoye Rural Settlement, Kochyovsky District, Perm Krai, Russia. The population was 195 as of 2010. There are 7 streets.

== Geography ==
Kukushka is located 20 km southeast of Kochyovo (the district's administrative centre) by road. Polozayka is the nearest rural locality.
