= Kaip, Altai Krai =

Village in Russia

Kaip Каип
- Village
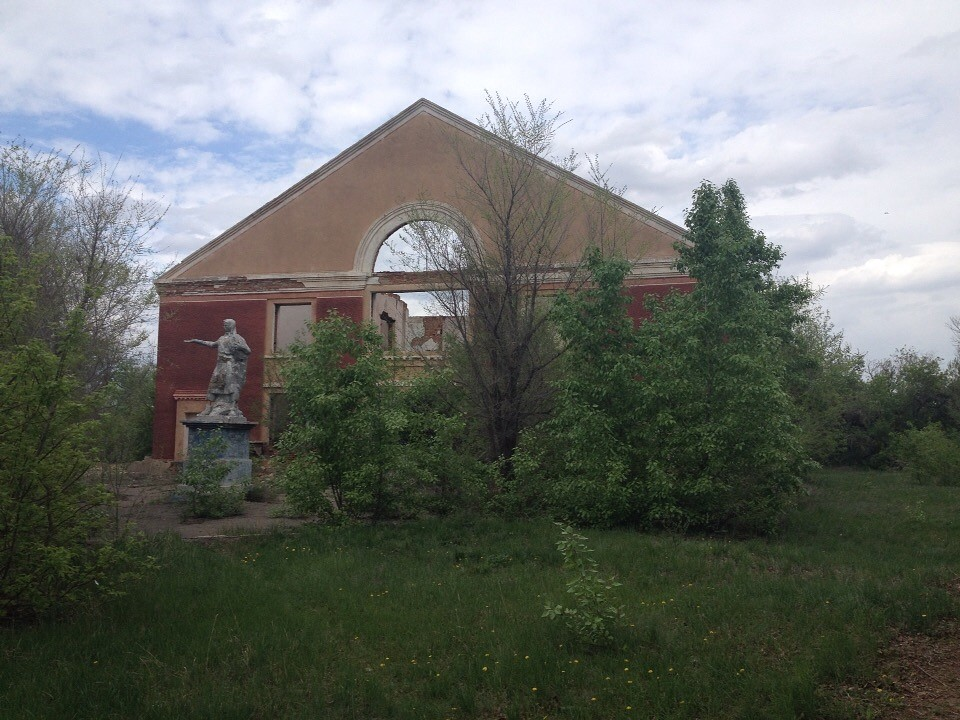

- Location within Altai Krai Location within Russia
- Coordinates: 52°15′N 79°47′E
- Country: Russia
- Region: Altai Krai
- District: Klyuchevsky District
- Time zone: UTC+7:00

Kaip (Russian: Каип) is a rural locality (a selo) and the administrative center of Kaipsky Selsoviet of Klyuchevsky District, Altai Krai, Russia. The population was 467 as of 2016. There are 7 streets.

== Geography ==
Kaip is located on the north bank of the Bulduk Lake, 47 km east of Klyuchi (the district's administrative centre) by road. Petukhi is the nearest rural locality.
