= Petukhovsky (rural locality) =

Petukhovsky (Russian: Петуховский; masculine), Petukhovskaya (Петуховская; feminine), or Petukhovskoye (Петуховское; neuter) is the name of several rural localities in Russia:

- Petukhovskoye, a village in Novodostovalovsky Selsoviet of Belozersky District of Kurgan Oblast
- Petukhovskaya, Kargopolsky District, Arkhangelsk Oblast, a village in Usachevsky Selsoviet of Kargopolsky District of Arkhangelsk Oblast
- Petukhovskaya, Velsky District, Arkhangelsk Oblast, a village in Muravyevsky Selsoviet of Velsky District of Arkhangelsk Oblast
