= Severka =

Severka Северка
- Village
- Location within Altai Krai Location within Russia
- Coordinates: 52°07′N 79°16′E
- Country: Russia
- Region: Altai Krai
- District: Klyuchevsky District
- Time zone: UTC+7:00

Severka (Russian: Северка) is a rural locality (a selo) and the administrative center of Seversky Selsoviet of Klyuchevsky District, Altai Krai, Russia. The population was 1,562 as of 2016. There are 16 streets.

== Geography and Ecology ==
Severka is located 16 km south of Klyuchi (the district's administrative centre) by road. Novovoznesenka is the nearest rural locality. Between Severka and the Russia-Kazakhstan border there is a lake named Petukhovo or Petukhovskoye (озеро Петуховское), a hypersaline soda lake. Metagenomic analyses of lake samples collected in July 2016 indicate the presence of archaea belonging to the Lokiarchaeota group (MAG: Ca. Lokiarchaeota archaeon isolate CSSed165cm_327R1) among other microbes.
