= Slava =

Slava may refer to:

== Ships ==
- Slava class cruiser, a modern Russian warship
  - Soviet cruiser Slava (1979), since 1995 Russian cruiser Moskva, a Slava class guided missile cruiser sunk during the 2022 Russian invasion of Ukraine
- Russian battleship Slava, a Russian World War I warship
- Soviet cruiser Slava (1939), previously known as Molotov, renamed Slava in 1957
- Slava (submarine), a Soviet-manufactured Bulgarian Romeo-class submarine
- Slava, a number of German-built ships seized by the UK during World War II and transferred to the Soviet Union, cf. List of Empire ships (U–Z)
  - Slava II, a German-built whaler in Russian service

== Traditions ==
- Slava (tradition), a custom of celebrating a family patron saint found mainly among the Serbs

== People ==
- Slava (given name), a Slavic masculine and feminine name
- Mstislav Rostropovich, Russian cellist and conductor
- Slava (singer), stage name of Russian singer Anastasia Slanevskaya

== Arts and entertainment ==
- Slava! A Political Overture, a 1977 composition by Leonard Bernstein
- Slava Music, a sub-label of Blonde Vinyl
- Slava (film), the Bulgarian title of Glory, a 2016 drama

== Places ==
- Slava (crater), a lunar crater
- Slava (river), a river in Tulcea County, Romania
- Slava, Altai Krai, a rural locality in Altai Krai, Russia
- Slava, Amur Oblast, Russia
- Slava Ice Shelf, Antarctica

== Other ==
- Slava Moscow, a Moscow-based Russian rugby union club
- Slava watches, a Russian brand produced by the Second Moscow Watch Factory

== See also ==
- Slava Ukraini
- Sława, a town in Poland
