= Petukhovo (Petukhi) =

Salt lake in Altai Krai, Russia

- Петухово
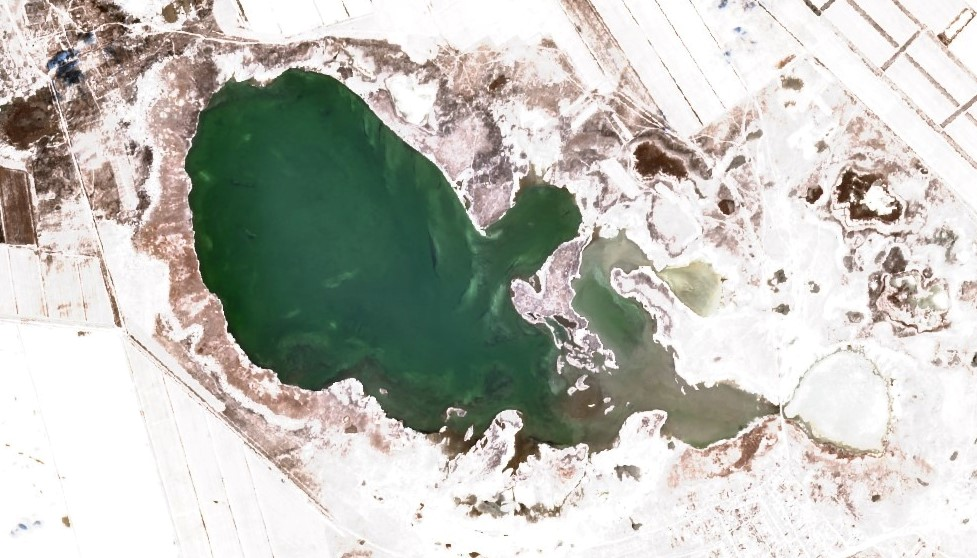
- Sentinel-2 image of the lake.

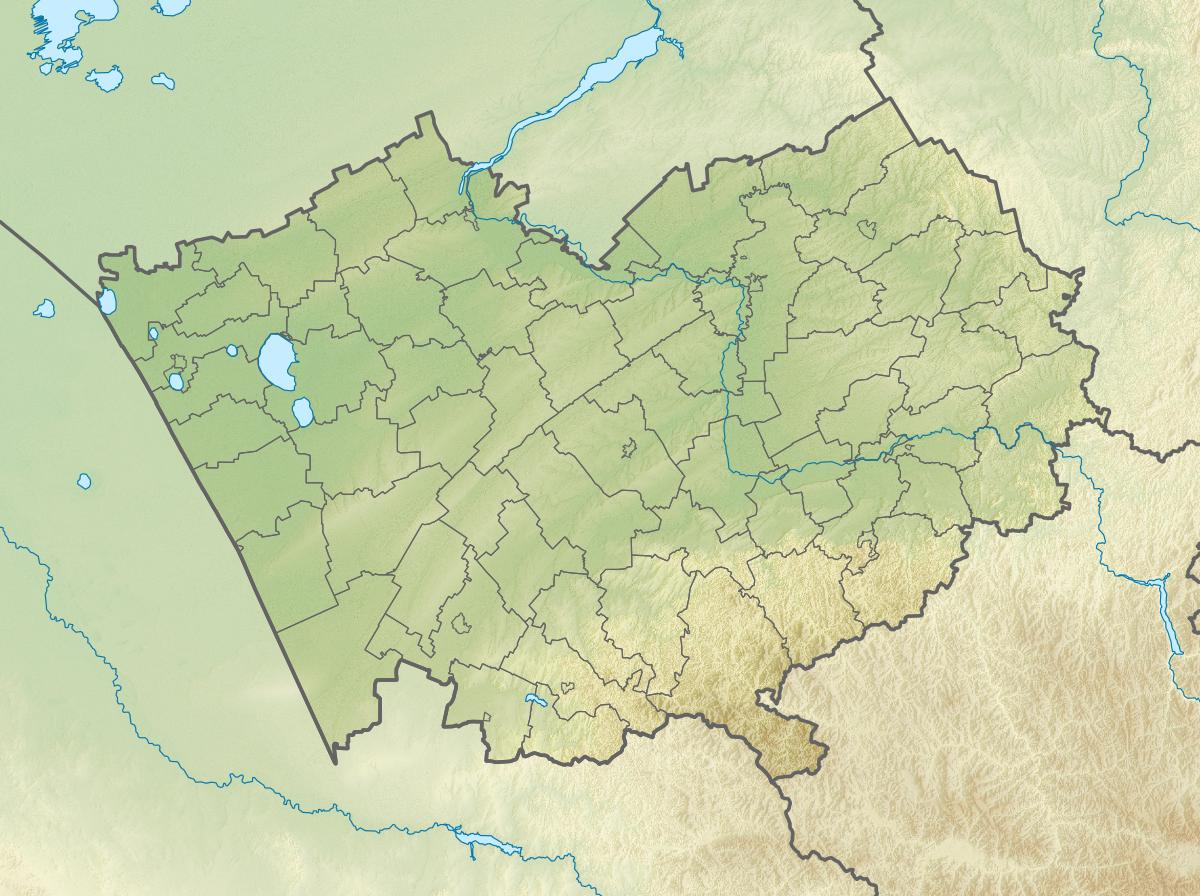
- Location within Altai Krai Location within Russia
- Location: Kulunda Steppe; West Siberian Plain
- Coordinates: 52°16′22″N 79°28′07″E
- Type: endorheic
- Catchment area: 29.4 square kilometers (11.4 sq mi)
- Basin countries: Russia
- Max. length: 7.2 kilometers (4.5 mi)
- Max. width: 3.1 kilometers (1.9 mi)
- Surface area: 14.3 square kilometers (5.5 sq mi)
- Average depth: 0.8 meters (2 ft 7 in)
- Residence time: UTC+6
- Surface elevation: 125 meters (410 ft)
- Settlements: Petukhi and Makarovka

Petukhovo (Russian: Петухово), also known as Petukhovskoye (Russian: Петуховское), is an alkaline lake in Klyuchevsky District, Altai Krai, Russian Federation.

The lake is located at the western edge of the Krai. The Russia-Kazakhstan border lies 35 kilometers (22 mi) to the southwest. The nearest inhabited places are Petukhi, close to the southern shore, and Makarovka, near the northwestern end. Klyuchi, the district capital, lies 18 kilometers (11 mi) to the west.

== Geography ==
Located in the Kulunda Plain, Petukhovo has an irregular shape, stretching roughly from northwest to southeast for approximately 7 kilometers (4.3 mi). In the north and northwest the lake is bound by a 4 meters (13 ft) to 5 meters (16 ft) high shore, while the eastern and southeastern shores have up to 16 meters (52 ft) high cliffs. Silt deposits at the bottom of the lake reach a thickness of 2 meters (6 ft 7 in) in the central part. The minerals in the bottom sediments are dominated by terrigenous quartz, feldspars, excess-Ca dolomite, and Mg-calcite, with the proportion of carbonates increasing in the lower part of the section. The water has a mineralization of 26.1 grams per liter (4.19 oz/imp gal) and a pH of 9.5.

Lake Shukyrtuz lies 7.5 kilometers (4.7 mi) to the north and Kurichye 2 kilometers (1.2 mi) to the south. 24 kilometers (15 mi) to the southwest there is another smaller lake named Petukhovo, 5 kilometers (3.1 mi) west of Severka.

== Flora and fauna ==
The lake is surrounded by deforested steppe landscape of low hills.

== See also ==
- List of lakes of Russia
