= Petukhi, Altai Krai =

Petukhi Петухи
- Selo
- Location within Altai Krai Location within Russia
- Coordinates: 52°14′N 79°32′E
- Country: Russia
- Region: Altai Krai
- District: Klyuchevsky District
- Time zone: UTC+7:00

Petukhi (Russian: Петухи) is a rural locality (a selo) and the administrative center of Petukhovsky Selsoviet, Klyuchevsky District, Altai Krai, Russia. The population was 874 as of 2013. There are 9 streets.

== Geography ==
Petukhi lies in the Kulunda Steppe, between lake Petukhovo to the north and lake Kurichye to the south. It is located 31 kilometers (19 mi) east of Klyuchi (the district's administrative centre) by road. Makarovka is the nearest rural locality.
