= Makarovka, Fatezhsky District, Kursk Oblast =

Rural locality in Kursk Oblast, Russia

Makarovka Макаровка
- Village
- Interactive map of Makarovka
- Location of Makarovka Makarovka (Kursk Oblast)
- Coordinates: 52°04′46″N 35°52′22″E
- Country: Russia
- Federal subject: Kursk Oblast
- Administrative district: Fatezhsky District
- SelsovietSelsoviet: Rusanovsky

Population (2010 Census)
  - Total: 124
  - Estimate (2010): 124 (0%)

Municipal status
  - Municipal district: Fatezhsky Municipal District
  - Rural settlement: Rusanovsky Selsoviet Rural Settlement
- Time zone: UTC+3 (MSK)
- Postal code: 307119
- Dialing code: +7 47144
- OKTMO ID: 38644464131
- Website: морусановский.рф

Makarovka (Russian: Макаровка) is a rural locality (Russian: деревня, lit. 'village') in Rusanovsky Selsoviet Rural Settlement, Fatezhsky District, Kursk Oblast, Russia. The population as of 2010 is 124.

== Geography ==
The village is located on the Usozha River (a left tributary of the Svapa in the basin of the Seym), 104 km from the Russia–Ukraine border, 43 km north-west of Kursk, 1 km south-east of the district center – the town Fatezh, 3 km from the selsoviet center – Basovka.

=== Climate ===
Makarovka has a warm-summer humid continental climate (Dfb in the Köppen climate classification).

== Transport ==
Makarovka is located 1.5 km from the federal route M-2 Crimea Highway as part of the European route E105, 2 km from the road of regional importance 38K-038 (Fatezh – Dmitriyev), 0.5 km from the road of intermunicipal significance 38H-670 (38K-038 – Basovka), 30 km from the nearest railway station Vozy (railway line Oryol – Kursk).

The rural locality is situated 46 km from Kursk Vostochny Airport, 166 km from Belgorod International Airport and 232 km from Voronezh Peter the Great Airport.
