= Vezhayka, Kudymkarsky District, Perm Krai =

Vezhayka Вежайка
- Village
- Location within Perm Krai Location within Russia
- Coordinates: 59°03′N 54°10′E
- Country: Russia
- Region: Perm Krai
- District: Kudymkarsky District
- Time zone: UTC+5:00

Vezhayka (Russian: Вежайка) is a rural locality (a village) in Verkh-Invenskoye Rural Settlement, Kudymkarsky District, Perm Krai, Russia. The population was 28 as of 2010. There is 1 street.

== Geography ==
Vezhayka is located 44 km northwest of Kudymkar (the district's administrative centre) by road. Andriyanova is the nearest rural locality.
