= Makarovka, Volgograd Oblast =

Makarovka Макаровка
- Selo
- Location within Volgograd Oblast Location within Russia
- Coordinates: 50°53′N 45°17′E
- Country: Russia
- Region: Volgograd Oblast
- District: Zhirnovsky District
- Time zone: UTC+4:00

Makarovka (Russian: Макаровка) is a rural locality (a selo) in Alyoshnikovskoye Rural Settlement, Zhirnovsky District, Volgograd Oblast, Russia. The population was 22 as of 2010.

== Geography ==
Makarovka is located in forest steppe of Volga Upland, 48 km southeast of Zhirnovsk (the district's administrative centre) by road. Podchinny is the nearest rural locality.
