= Vaskino, Gaynsky District, Perm Krai =

Vaskino Васькино
- Village
- Location within Perm Krai Location within Russia
- Coordinates: 60°10′N 54°25′E
- Country: Russia
- Region: Perm Krai
- District: Gaynsky District
- Time zone: UTC+5:00

Vaskino (Russian: Васькино) is a rural locality (a village) in Gaynskoye Rural Settlement, Gaynsky District, Perm Krai, Russia. The population was 26 as of 2010. There is one street.

== Geography ==
Vaskino is located 18 km south of Gayny (the district's administrative centre) by road. Chazhegovo is the nearest rural locality.
