= Makarovka, Chekmagushevsky District, Republic of Bashkortostan =

Makarovka Макаровка
- Village
- Location within Bashkortostan Location within Russia
- Coordinates: 54°57′N 54°29′E
- Country: Russia
- Region: Bashkortostan
- District: Chekmagushevsky District
- Time zone: UTC+5:00

Makarovka (Russian: Макаровка; Bashkir: Маҡар, Maqar) is a rural locality (a village) in Chekmagushevsky District, Bashkortostan, Russia. The population was 52 as of 2010. There is 1 street.

== Geography ==
Makarovka is located 27 km southwest of Chekmagush (the district's administrative centre) by road. Karazirek is the nearest rural locality.
