= Petukhovo, Vladimir Oblast =

Petukhovo Петухово
- Village
- Location within Vladimir Oblast Location within Russia
- Coordinates: 56°06′N 39°04′E
- Country: Russia
- Region: Vladimir Oblast
- District: Kirzhachsky District
- Time zone: UTC+3:00

Petukhovo (Russian: Петухово) is a rural locality (a village) in Kiprevskoye Rural Settlement, Kirzhachsky District, Vladimir Oblast, Russia. The population was 3 as of 2010. There is 1 street.

== Geography ==
Petukhovo is located 19 km southeast of Kirzhach (the district's administrative centre) by road. Levakhi is the nearest rural locality.
