= Makarovka, Vladimir Oblast =

Makarovka Макаровка
- Village
- Location within Vladimir Oblast Location within Russia
- Coordinates: 55°35′N 41°56′E
- Country: Russia
- Region: Vladimir Oblast
- District: Muromsky District
- Time zone: UTC+3:00

Makarovka (Russian: Мака́ровка) is a rural locality (a village) in Kovarditskoye Rural Settlement, Muromsky District, Vladimir Oblast, Russia. The population was 424 as of 2010. There are 4 streets.

== Geography ==
Makarovka is located on the Pogartsy River, 9 km west of Murom (the district's administrative centre) by road. Aleksandrovka is the nearest rural locality.
