= Vaskino, Mezhdurechensky District, Vologda Oblast =

Vaskino Васькино
- Village
- Location within Vologda Oblast Location within Russia
- Coordinates: 59°19′N 40°57′E
- Country: Russia
- Region: Vologda Oblast
- District: Mezhdurechensky District
- Time zone: UTC+3:00

Vaskino (Russian: Васькино) is a village in Sukhonskoye Rural Settlement, Mezhdurechensky District, Vologda Oblast, Russia.
