= Petukhovskaya, Velsky District, Arkhangelsk Oblast =

Petukhovskaya Петуховская
- Village
- Location within Arkhangelsk Oblast Location within Russia
- Coordinates: 61°06′N 42°09′E
- Country: Russia
- Region: Arkhangelsk Oblast
- District: Velsky District
- Time zone: UTC+3:00

Petukhovskaya (Russian: Петуховская) is a rural locality (a village) in Muravyovskoye Rural Settlement of Velsky District, Arkhangelsk Oblast, Russia. The population was 178 as of 2014. There are 2 streets.

== Geography ==
Petukhovskaya is located 7 km northeast of Velsk (the district's administrative centre) by road. Gorka Muravyovskaya is the nearest rural locality.
