= Krivaya Puchina =

Salt lake in Altai Krai, Russia

- Кривая Пучина
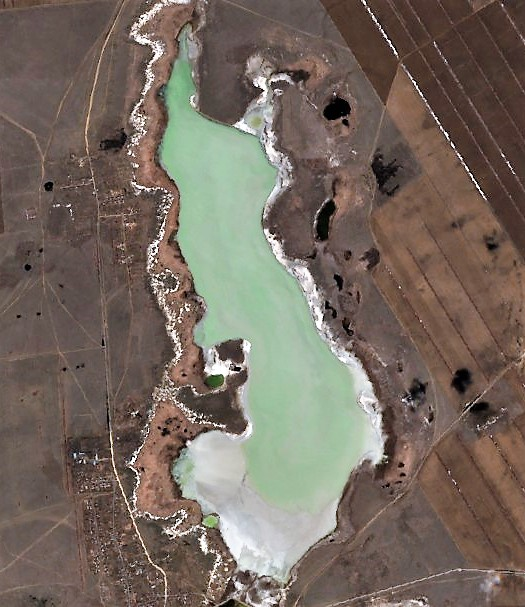
- Sentinel-2 image of the lake

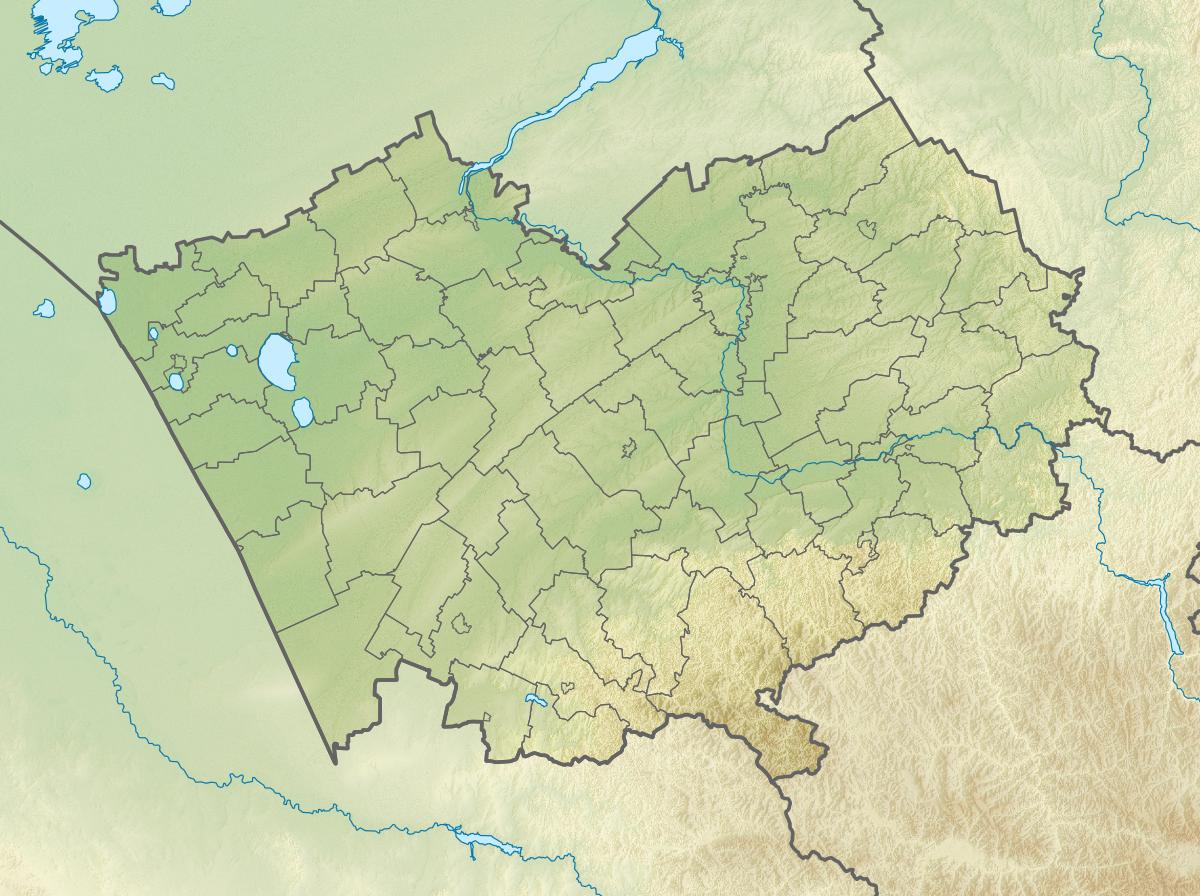
- Location within Altai Krai Location within Russia
- Location: Kulunda Steppe; West Siberian Plain
- Coordinates: 52°26′39″N 79°21′41″E
- Type: endorheic
- Basin countries: Russia
- Max. length: 6.3 kilometers (3.9 mi)
- Max. width: 2.1 kilometers (1.3 mi)
- Surface area: 7.3 square kilometers (2.8 sq mi)
- Residence time: UTC+6
- Surface elevation: 120 meters (390 ft)
- Settlements: Novopoltava and Petrovka

Krivaya Puchina (Russian: Кривая Пучина) is a salt lake in Klyuchevsky District, Altai Krai, Russian Federation.

The lake is located at the western edge of the Krai. The Russia-Kazakhstan border lies 37 kilometers (23 mi) to the southwest. The nearest inhabited places are Novopoltava, located by the southern end, and Petrovka, near the western shore. Klyuchi, the district capital, lies 22 kilometers (14 mi) to the southwest.

The Klyuchevskoye deposit of underground industrial waters is located in the area of the Krivaya Puchina and Tolubay lakes.

== Geography ==
Located in the Kulunda Plain, Krivaya Puchina has an elongated shape. It stretches for approximately 6 kilometers (3.7 mi) from north to south. The shores are indented, forming bays an peninsulas.

Lake Shukyrtuz lies 6 kilometers (3.7 mi) to the SSE, Petukhovo 15 kilometers (9.3 mi) in the same direction, and Gorkiye Kilty 8 kilometers (5.0 mi) to the north.

== Flora and fauna ==
The lake is surrounded by flat steppe landscape.

== See also ==
- List of lakes of Russia
