= Petukhovo (town), Kurgan Oblast =

Town in Kurgan Oblast, Russia

Petukhovo Петухово
- Town
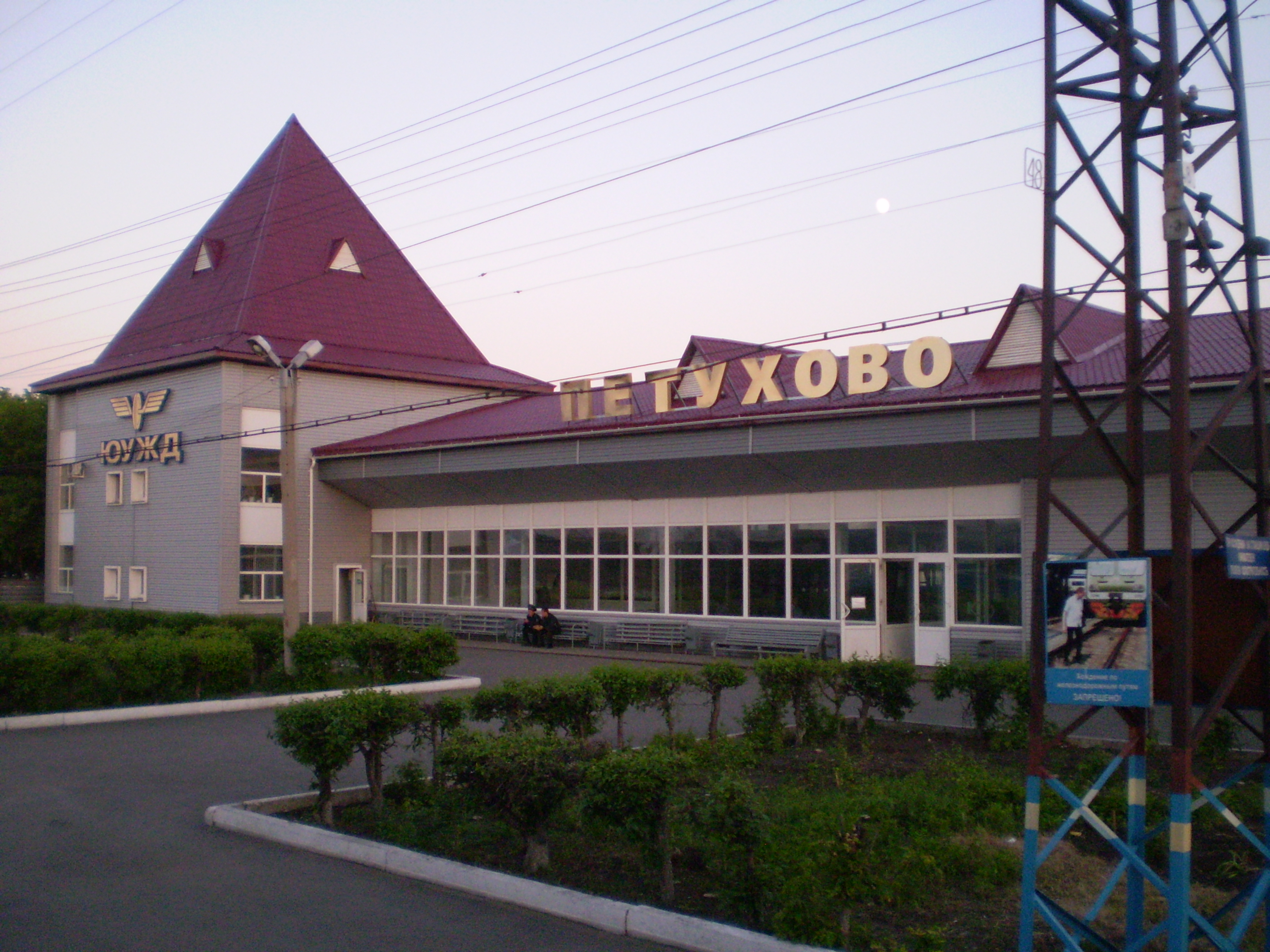
- Petukhovo station, Southern-Ural railway

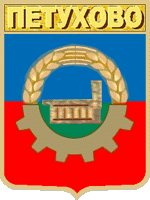
- Coat of arms
- Interactive map of Petukhovo
- Location of Petukhovo Petukhovo (Kurgan Oblast)
- Coordinates: 55°04′N 67°54′E
- Country: Russia
- Federal subject: Kurgan Oblast
- Administrative district: Petukhovsky District
- Town under district jurisdictionSelsoviet: Petukhovo
- Founded: 1892
- Town status since: 1944
- Elevation: 135 m (443 ft)

Population (2010 Census)
  - Total: 11,292
  - Estimate (2025): 8,149 (−27.8%)

Administrative status
  - Capital of: Petukhovsky District, Petukhovo Town Under District Jurisdiction

Municipal status
  - Municipal district: Petukhovsky Municipal District
  - Urban settlement: Petukhovo Urban Settlement
  - Capital of: Petukhovsky Municipal District, Petukhovo Urban Settlement
- Time zone: UTC+5 (MSK+2)
- Postal code: 641640–641642
- OKTMO ID: 37626101001
- Website: www.petuhovo.net

Petukhovo (Russian: Петухо́во) is a town and the administrative center of Petukhovsky District in Kurgan Oblast, Russia, located on the Ishim Plain 180 kilometers (110 mi) southeast of Kurgan, the administrative center of the oblast. Population: 11,292 (2010 census); 12,661 (2002 census); 14,584 (1989 Soviet census). It is located on the Kazakhstan–Russia border.

== History ==
It was founded in 1892 as a settlement around a railway station of the Trans-Siberian Railway. In 1899, Petukhovo merged with the nearby village of Yudino. In 1944, it was granted town status.

== Administrative and municipal status ==
Within the framework of administrative divisions, Petukhovo serves as the administrative center of Petukhovsky District. As an administrative division, it is incorporated within Petukhovsky District as Petukhovo Town Under District Jurisdiction. As a municipal division, Petukhovo Town Under District Jurisdiction is incorporated within Petukhovsky Municipal District as Petukhovo Urban Settlement.
