= Petukhovsky District =

District in Kurgan Oblast, Russia

Petukhovsky District Петуховский район (Russian)
- District
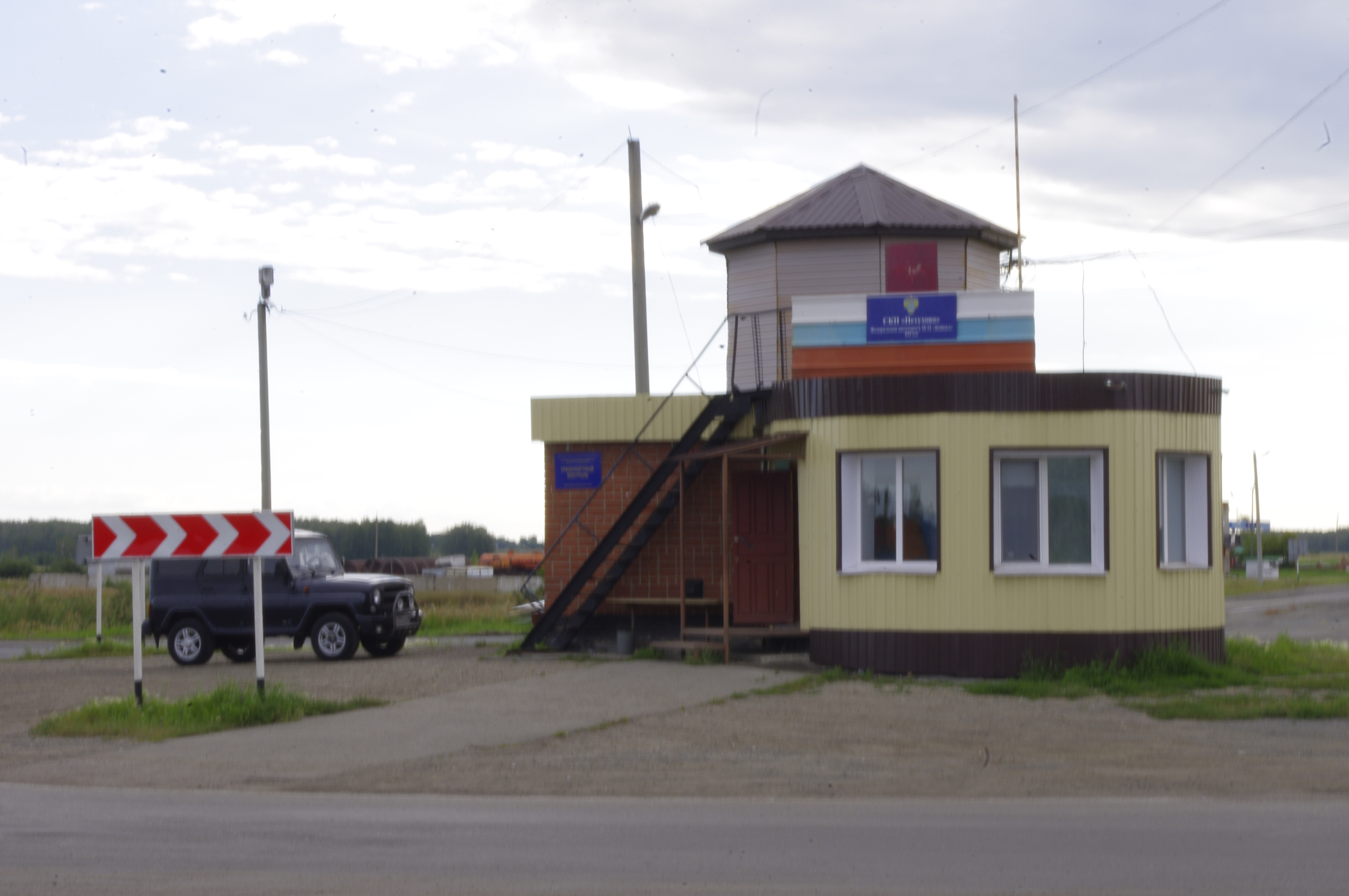
- Border control post at Russia-Kazakhstan border, Petukhovsky District

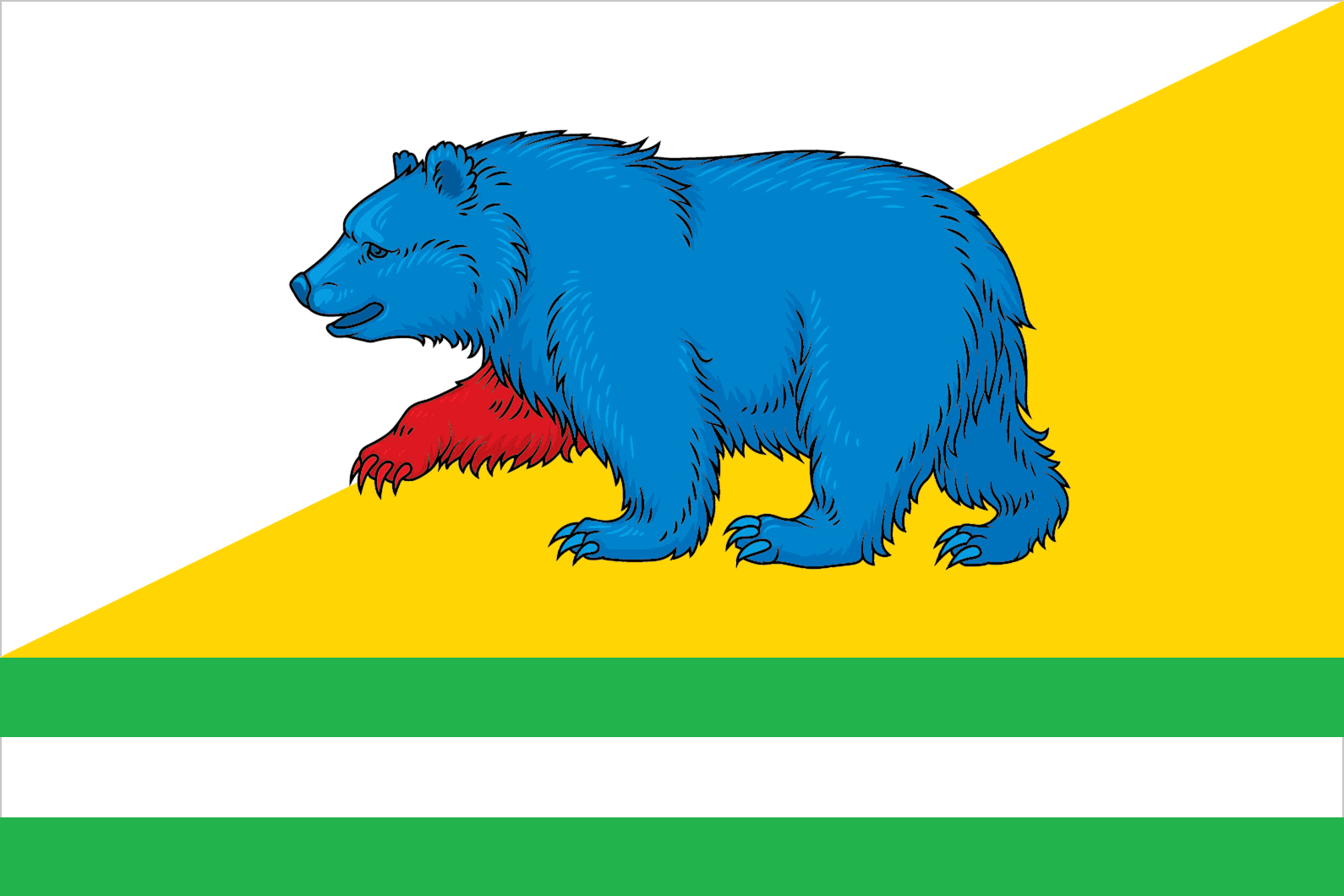
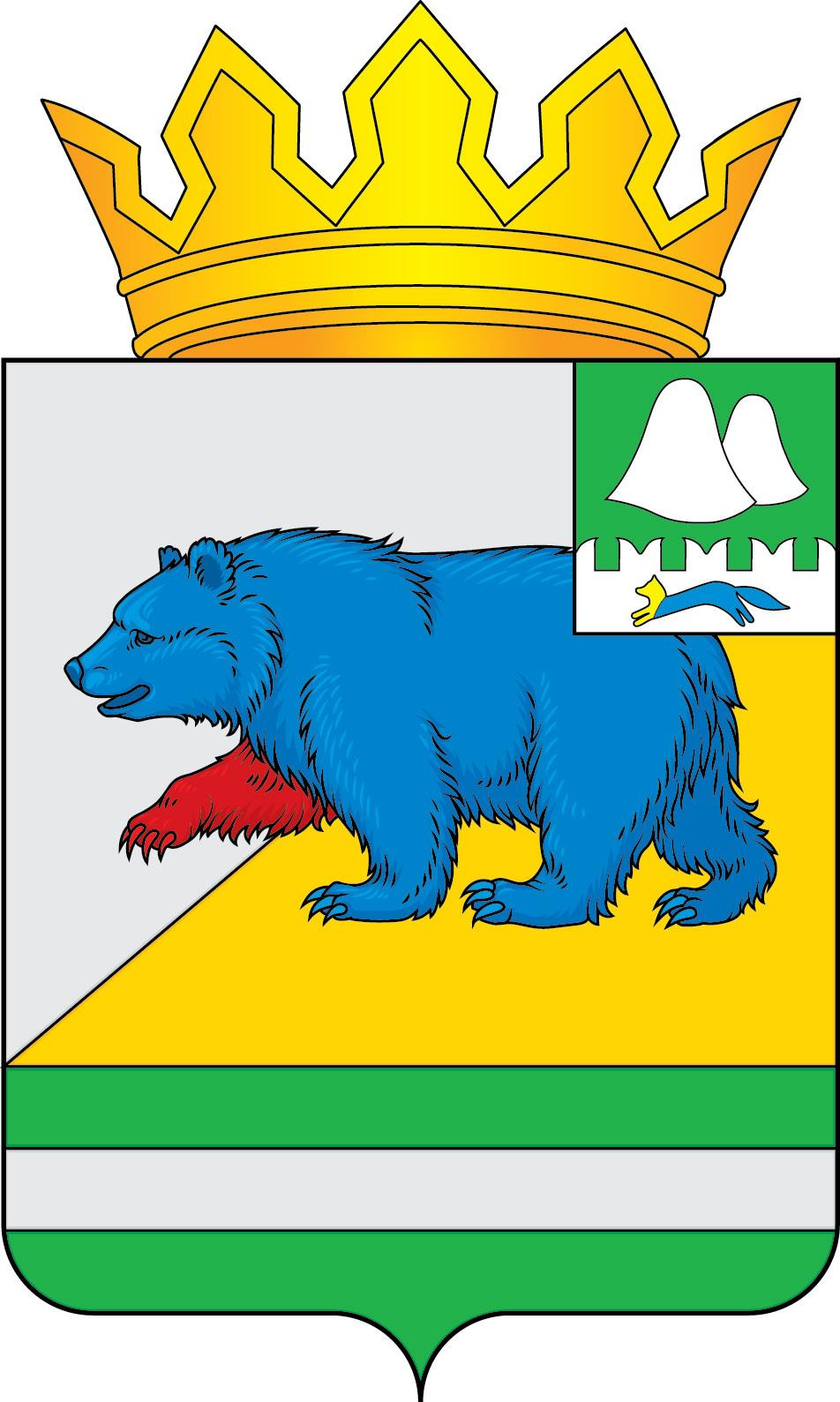
- Flag Coat of arms
- Location of Petukhovsky District in Kurgan Oblast
- Coordinates: 55°04′N 67°53′E
- Country: Russia
- Federal subject: Kurgan Oblast
- Established: 3 November 1923
- Administrative center: Petukhovo

Area
  - Total: 2,780 km^{2} (1,070 sq mi)

Population (2010 Census)
  - Total: 20,493
  - Density: 7.37/km^{2} (19.1/sq mi)
  - Urban: 55.1%
  - Rural: 44.9%

Administrative structure
  - Administrative divisions: 1 Towns under district jurisdiction, 17 Selsoviets
  - Inhabited localities: 1 cities/towns, 37 rural localities

Municipal structure
  - Municipally incorporated as: Petukhovsky Municipal District
  - Municipal divisions: 1 urban settlements, 17 rural settlements
- Time zone: UTC+5 (MSK+2)
- OKTMO ID: 37626000
- Website: http://admpr.ru/

Petukhovsky District (Russian: Петуховский райо́н) is an administrative and municipal district (raion), one of the twenty-four in Kurgan Oblast, Russia. It is located in the east of the oblast. The area of the district is 2,780 square kilometers (1,070 sq mi). Its administrative center is the town of Petukhovo. Population: 20,493 (2010 census); 24,253 (2002 Census); 28,109 (1989 Soviet census). The population of Petukhovo accounts for 55.1% of the district's total population.
