= Shukyrtuz =

Salt lake in Altai Krai, Russia

- Шукыртуз
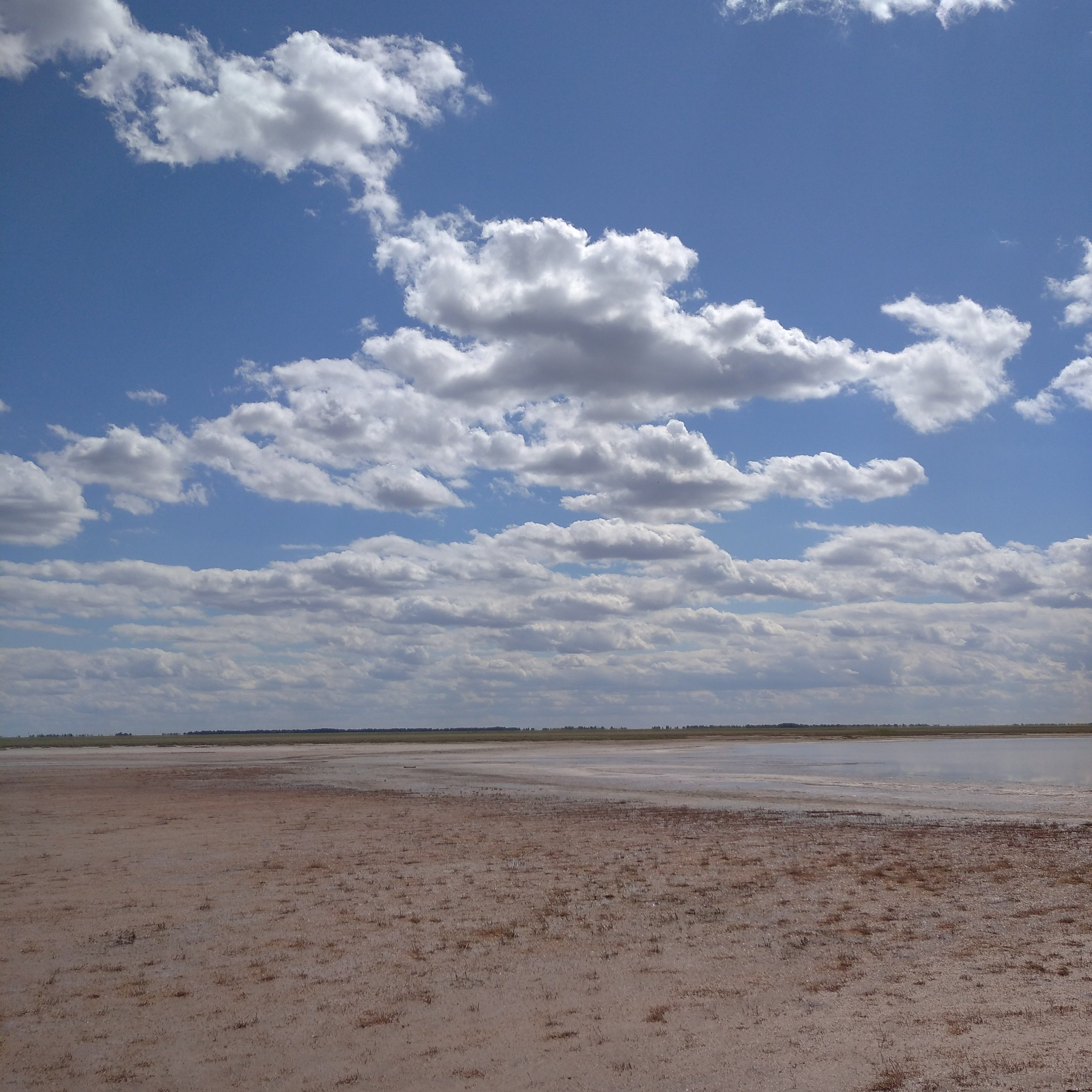
- Panorama of the lakeshore.

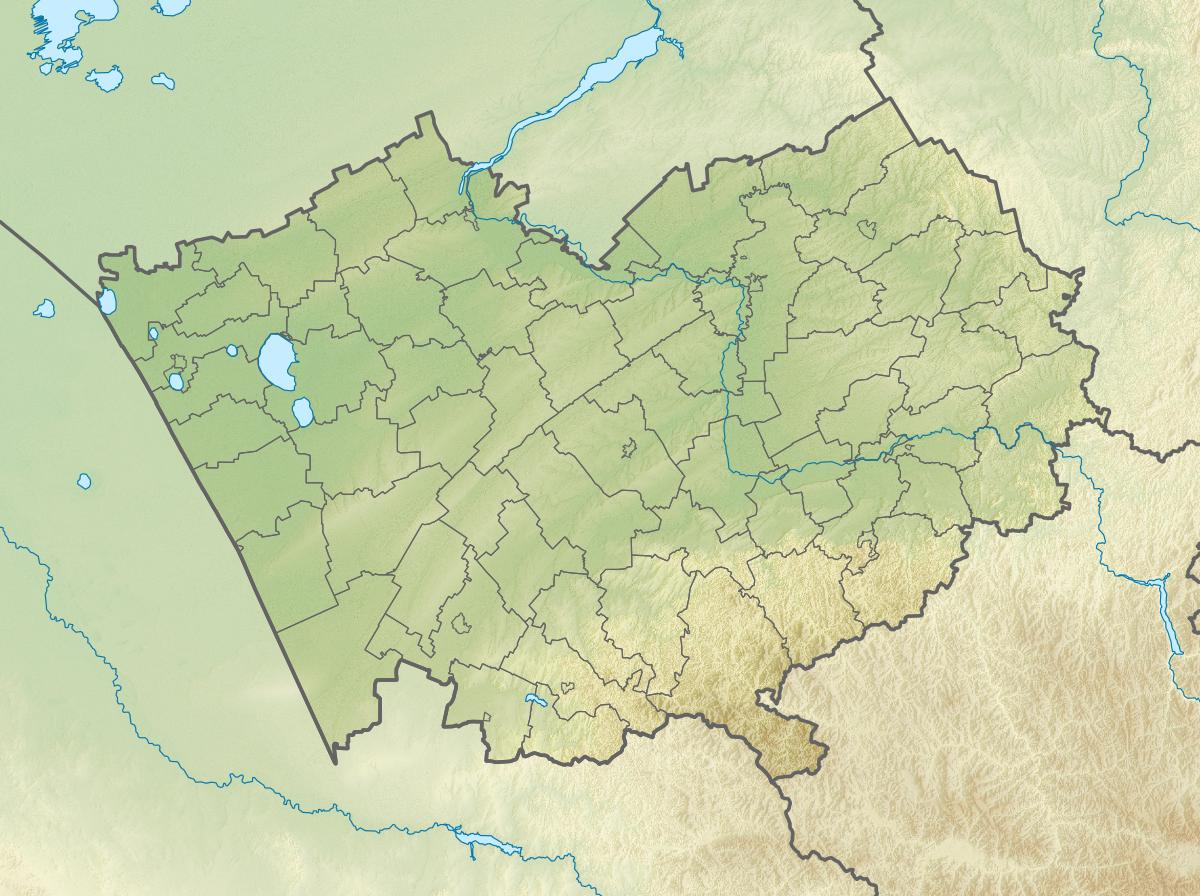
- Location within Altai Krai Location within Russia
- Location: Kulunda Steppe; West Siberian Plain
- Coordinates: 52°22′11″N 79°24′52″E
- Type: endorheic
- Basin countries: Russia
- Max. length: 4 kilometers (2.5 mi)
- Max. width: 2.2 kilometers (1.4 mi)
- Surface area: 5.1 square kilometers (2.0 sq mi)
- Average depth: 1.2 meters (3 ft 11 in)
- Max. depth: 1.6 meters (5 ft 3 in)
- Residence time: UTC+6
- Surface elevation: 119 meters (390 ft)
- Settlements: Novopoltava and Istimis

Shukyrtuz (Russian: Шукыртуз) is a salt lake in Klyuchevsky District, Altai Krai, Russian Federation.

The lake is located at the western edge of the Krai. The Russia-Kazakhstan border lies 38 kilometers (24 mi) to the southwest. The nearest inhabited places are Novopoltava and Istimis. Klyuchi, the district capital, lies 19 kilometers (12 mi) to the southwest.

In 1998 the lake was declared a natural monument of regional significance. In some parts of the lake there is viscous black mud with a hydrogen sulphide smell which is deemed to have medicinal properties.

== Geography ==
Located in the Kulunda Plain, Shukyrtuz has a drop shape. It stretches for approximately 4 kilometers (2.5 mi) with the point in the north. The northern shore rises up to 2 meters (6 ft 7 in) in height and is cut in places by gullies, while the southern shore is flat and gently sloping. The lake is shallow, with a maximum depth in the central area not exceeding 1.6 meters (5 ft 3 in). The bottom is sandy and silty. The water is saline, with a high mineralization reaching 180 grams per liter (29 oz/imp gal).

Lake Petukhovo lies 7 kilometers (4.3 mi) to the south, Krivaya Puchina 6 kilometers (3.7 mi) to the NNW, and larger lake Kuchuk 33 kilometers (21 mi) to the northeast.

== Flora and fauna ==
The lake is surrounded by flat steppe landscape. The vegetation includes fescue, wormwood, milkvetch, feather grass, Limonium and saltwort. The lake provides a habitat for Artemia salina crustaceans. There is no fish fauna.

== See also ==
- List of lakes of Russia
