= Klyuchevsky District =

Klyuchevsky District Ключевский район (Russian)
- District
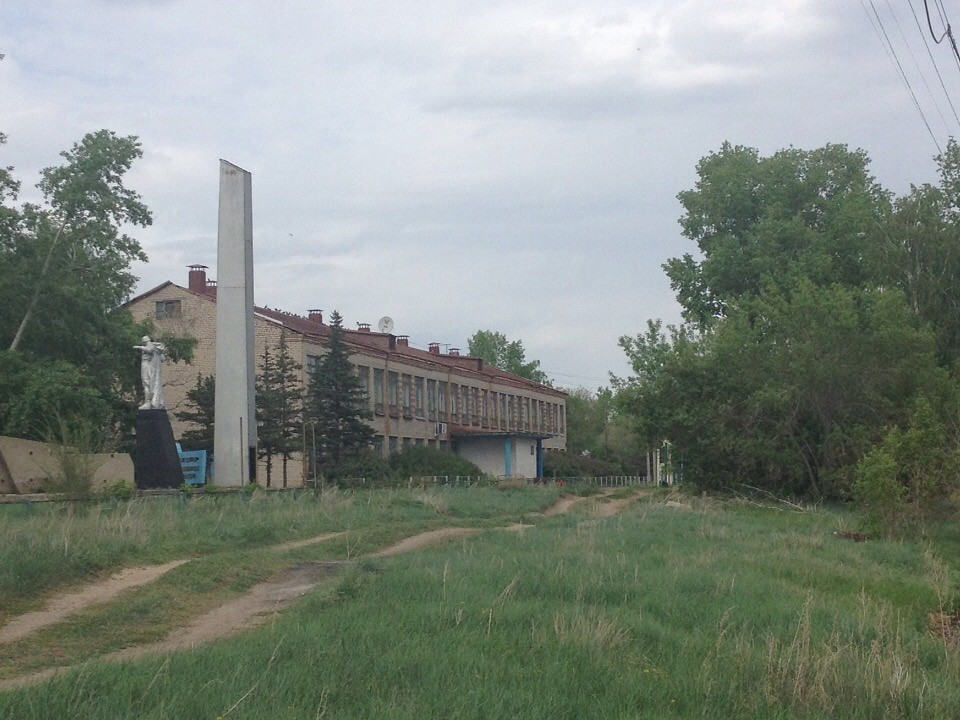
- The selo of Kaip in Klyuchevsky District

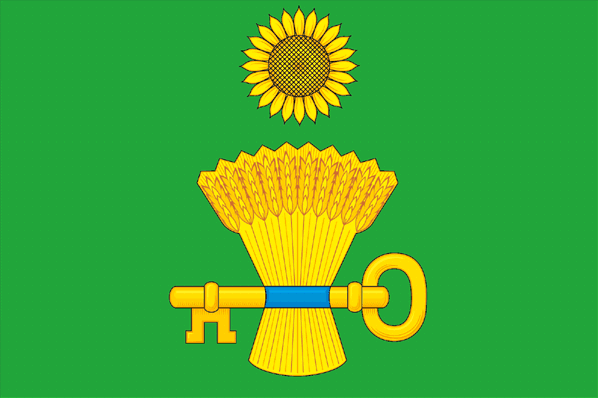
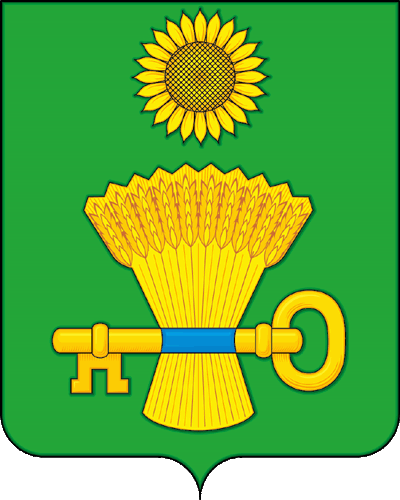
- Flag Coat of arms
- Location of Klyuchevsky District in Altai Krai
- Coordinates: 52°16′N 79°10′E
- Country: Russia
- Federal subject: Altai Krai
- Established: 1928
- Administrative center: Klyuchi

Area
  - Total: 3,043 km^{2} (1,175 sq mi)

Population (2010 Census)
  - Total: 18,267
  - Density: 6.003/km^{2} (15.55/sq mi)
  - Urban: 0%
  - Rural: 100%

Administrative structure
  - Administrative divisions: 10 Selsoviets
  - Inhabited localities: 18 rural localities

Municipal structure
  - Municipally incorporated as: Klyuchevsky Municipal District
  - Municipal divisions: 0 urban settlements, 10 rural settlements
- Time zone: UTC+7 (MSK+4)
- OKTMO ID: 01617000
- Website: http://kluchialt.ru

Population of Klyuchevsky District
- 2010 Census: 18,267
- 2002 Census: 20,113
- 1989 Census: 19,271
- 1979 Census: 20,124

Klyuchevsky District (Russian: Ключе́вский райо́н) is an administrative and municipal district (raion), one of the fifty-nine in Altai Krai, Russia. It is located in the west of the krai. The area of the district is 3,043 square kilometers (1,175 sq mi). Its administrative center is the rural locality (a selo) of Klyuchi. As of the 2010 Census, the total population of the district was 18,267, with the population of Klyuchi accounting for 48.7% of that number.

== Geography ==
Klyuchevsky District lies in the Kulunda Plain; flat steppe landscape dominates the area. There are no major rivers running through the district, but there are 26 significant lakes, including Krivaya Puchina, Shukyrtuz, Petukhovo (near Petukhi), Petukhovo (near Severka) and Kurichye. 52% of the area is arable land for crops, another 20% used in pasture, and the southwest corner of the district is forested. Klyuchevsky District lies about 350 km to the southwest of the city of Novosibirsk, 280 km west of the regional city of Barnaul, and 2,600 km east of Moscow. The district measures 60 km (north–south), and 60 km (west–east); its total area is 3,042 km2 (about 2% of Altai Krai). The administrative center is the town of Klyuchi in the west-center of the district, on the one major road running north–south through the district.

The district is located on the western border Altai Krai and is bordered to the north by Kulundinsky District, to the east by Rodinsky District, to the south by Mikhaylovsky District, and to the west by the Pavlodar Region of Kazakhstan.
