= Klyuchi, Klyuchevsky District, Altai Krai =

Rural locality in Russia

Klyuchi Ключи
- Selo
- Interactive map of Klyuchi
- Location of Klyuchi Klyuchi (Altai Krai)
- Coordinates: 52°15′11″N 79°10′5″E
- Country: Russia
- Federal subject: Altai Krai
- Administrative district: Klyuchevsky District
- SelsovietSelsoviet: Klyuchevsky Selsoviet
- Founded: 1874

Population (2010 Census)
  - Total: 8,892
  - Estimate (2021): 7,107 (−20.1%)

Administrative status
  - Capital of: Klyuchevsky District, Klyuchevsky Selsoviet

Municipal status
  - Municipal district: Klyuchevsky Municipal District
  - Rural settlement: Klyuchevsky Selsoviet Rural Settlement
  - Capital of: Klyuchevsky Municipal District, Klyuchevsky Selsoviet Rural Settlement
- Time zone: UTC+7 (MSK+4)
- Postal code: 658980
- OKTMO ID: 01617424101

Klyuchi (Russian: Ключи) is a rural locality (a selo) and the administrative center of Klyuchevsky District of Altai Krai, Russia. Population: 8,892 (2010 census); 9,278 (2002 census); 8,248 (1989 Soviet census).
