= Kochyovo =

Kochyovo Кочёво
- Selo
- Location within Perm Krai Location within Russia
- Coordinates: 59°35′N 54°18′E
- Country: Russia
- Region: Perm Krai
- District: Kochyovsky District
- Time zone: UTC+5:00

Kochyovo (Russian: Кочёво; Komi-Permyak: Кӧч, Köć) is a rural locality (a selo) and the administrative center of Kochyovskoye Rural Settlement and Kochyovsky District, Perm Krai, Russia. The population was 3,504 as of 2010. There are 54 streets.

== Geography ==
It is located on the Sepol River.
