= Kochyovsky District =

Kochyovsky District Кочёвский район
- District
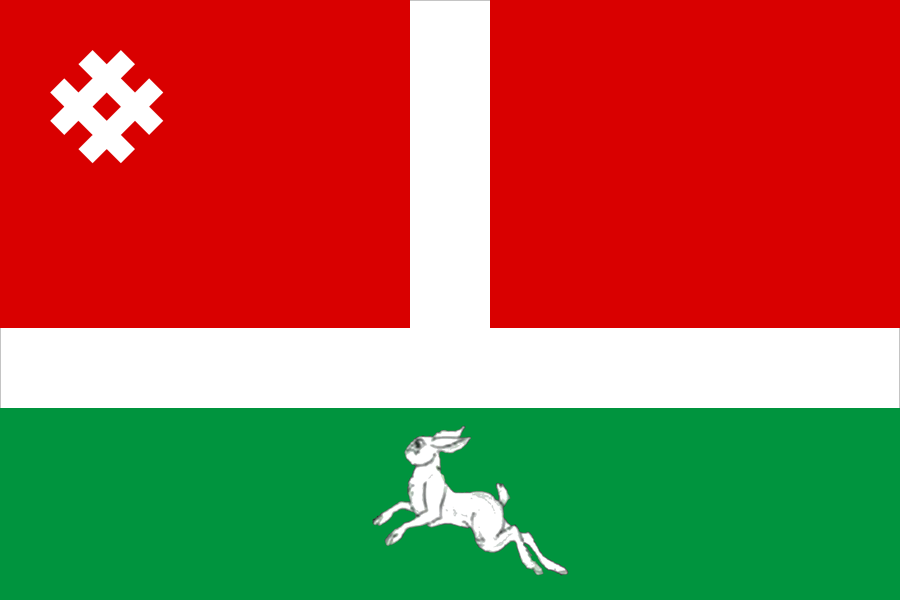
- Flag Coat of arms
- Location of Kochyovsky District in Komi-Permyak Okrug, Perm Krai
- Coordinates: 59.711°N 54.173°E
- Country: Russia
- Federal subject: Perm Krai
- Established: September 15, 1926
- Administrative center: Kochyovo

Area
  - Total: 2,700 km^{2} (1,000 sq mi)

Population (2010 Census)
  - Total: 11,167
  - Density: 4.1/km^{2} (11/sq mi)
  - Urban: 0%
  - Rural: 100%

Administrative structure
  - Inhabited localities: 67 rural localities

Municipal structure
  - Municipally incorporated as: Kochyovsky Municipal District
  - Municipal divisions: 0 urban settlements, 5 rural settlements
- Time zone: UTC+5 (MSK+2)
- OKTMO ID: 57819000
- Website: http://kochevo.permarea.ru/

Kochyovsky District (Russian: Кочёвский райо́н; Komi-Permyak: Кӧчладор район, Köćlador rajon) is an administrative district (raion) of Komi-Permyak Okrug of Perm Krai, Russia; one of the thirty-three in the krai. Municipally, it is incorporated as Kochyovsky Municipal District. It is located in the northwest of the krai. The area of the district is 2,700 square kilometers (1,000 sq mi). Its administrative center is the rural locality (a selo) of Kochyovo. Population: 11,167 (2010 Census); 12,856 (2002 Census); 14,188 (1989 Soviet census). The population of Kochyovo accounts for 31.4% of the district's total population.

== Geography ==
About 85% of the district's territory is covered by forests.

== History ==
The district was established on September 15, 1926.

== Demographics ==
Ethnic composition (as of the 2002 Census):

- Komi-Permyak people: 80.1%
- Russians: 18.1%

== Economy ==
The economy of the district is based on forestry, timber industry, and agriculture.

== Sources ==
- Законодательное собрание Пермской области. Закон №416-67 от 28 февраля 1996 г. «Об административно-территориальном устройстве Пермского края», в ред. Закона №504-ПК от 9 июля 2015 г. «О внесении изменений в Закон Пермской области "Об административно-территориальном устройстве Пермского края"». Вступил в силу с момента опубликования. Опубликован: "Звезда", №38, 12 марта 1996 г. (Legislative Assembly of Perm Oblast. Law #416-67 of February 28, 1996 On the Administrative-Territorial Structure of Perm Krai, as amended by the Law #504-PK of July 9, 2015 On Amending the Law of Perm Oblast "On the Administrative-Territorial Structure of Perm Krai". Effective as of the moment of publication.).
- Законодательное собрание Коми-Пермяцкого автономного округа. Закон №50 от 24 июня 2005 г. «Об утверждении границ и о наделении статусом муниципальных образований Кочевского района Пермского края», в ред. Закона №328-ПК от 7 июня 2014 г. «О внесении изменений в отдельные Законы Пермской области и Коми-Пермяцкого автономного округа». Вступил в силу через 10 дней со дня официального опубликования. Опубликован: "Парма", №138–139, 5 июля 2005 г. (Legislative Assembly of Komi-Permyak Autonomous Okrug. Law #50 of June 24, 2005 On Establishing the Borders and on Granting the Status to the Municipal Formations of Kochevsky District of Perm Krai, as amended by the Law #328-PK of June 7, 2014 On Amending Various Laws of Perm Oblast and Komi-Permyak Autonomous Okrug. Effective as of the day which is 10 days following the day of the official publication.).
