= List of districts in Russia =

This is a list of districts of Russia. A district (raion) is an administrative and municipal division of a federal subject of Russia.

Within the framework of administrative divisions, the administrative districts are on the same level of hierarchy as the cities of federal subject significance and may be further subdivided into towns of district significance, urban-type settlements of district significance, and selsoviets, although the exact terms for these entities vary from one federal subject to another.

Within the framework of municipal divisions, the municipal districts are on the same level of hierarchy as urban okrugs and are further subdivided into urban settlements, rural settlements, or both. Municipal districts are commonly formed within the boundaries of existing administrative districts, although in practice there are some exceptions to this rule.

Major Russian cities are divided into city districts. Despite a similarity in terminology, they are divisions of a different kind and are not within the scope of this article.

Unlike other federal subjects of Russia, the federal cities have the unique structure of the administrative-territorial divisions. The administrative-territorial divisions of the federal city of Moscow in particular include districts and settlements, which, in turn, are grouped into administrative okrugs. Only the districts are included below. However, as the districts of neither Moscow nor St. Petersburg include any inhabited localities, they do not have administrative centers.

The Republic of Crimea is a federal subject of Russia formed on the territory of the Crimean Peninsula, which is disputed between Russia and Ukraine. Within the Russian legal framework, the districts of the Autonomous Republic of Crimea (an administrative division of Ukraine) continue to be in use and are included in the tables below. The federal city of Sevastopol is also located on the peninsula, with its districts having a status similar to that of the districts of Moscow and St. Petersburg.

As of 2014, excluding Moscow, St. Petersburg, and Sevastopol, there are 1,873 administrative districts (including the 14 in the Republic of Crimea) and 1,823 municipal districts (also including the 14 in the Republic of Crimea) in Russia. All these districts have an administrative center, which is usually the same locality for both the administrative and municipal entity.

== Administrative districts ==
The following tables list the administrative districts of the federal subjects and include their administrative center and population information. Unless otherwise noted, the administrative districts are municipally incorporated as municipal districts and the boundaries of the two entities are identical.

=== Republic of Adygea ===
District	Russian name	Adyghe name	Administrative center	Population (2010 Census)
Giaginsky District	Гиагинский район	Джэджэ къедзыгъо	stanitsa of Giaginskaya	31766
Koshekhablsky District	Кошехабльский район	Кощхьэблэ къедзыгъон	aul of Koshekhabl	30422
Krasnogvardeysky District	Красногвардейский район	Красногвардейскэ къедзыгъо	selo of Krasnogvardeyskoye	30868
Maykopsky District	Майкопский район	Мыекъуэпэ къедзыгъо	settlement of Tulsky	58439
Shovgenovsky District	Шовгеновский район	Шэуджэн къедзыгъо	aul of Khakurinokhabl	16997
Takhtamukaysky District	Тахтамукайский район	Тэхъутэмыкъуае къедзыгъо	aul of Takhtamukay	69662
Teuchezhsky District	Теучежский район	Теуцожь къедзыгъо	aul of Ponezhukay	20643

=== Altai Krai ===
District	Russian name	Administrative center	Population (2010 Census)
Aleysky District	Алейский район	town of Aleysk	16800
Altaysky District	Алтайский район	selo of Altayskoye	25645
Bayevsky District	Баевский район	selo of Bayevo	10979
Biysky District	Бийский район	city of Biysk	34067
Blagoveshchensky District	Благовещенский район	work settlement of Blagoveshchenka	30783
Burlinsky District	Бурлинский район	selo of Burla	12042
Bystroistoksky District	Быстроистокский район	selo of Bystry Istok	10150
Charyshsky District	Чарышский район	selo of Charyshskoye	12337
Kalmansky District	Калманский район	selo of Kalmanka	14331
Kamensky District	Каменский район	town of Kamen-na-Obi	12025
Khabarsky District	Хабарский район	selo of Khabary	16431
Klyuchevsky District	Ключевский район	selo of Klyuchi	18267
Kosikhinsky District	Косихинский район	selo of Kosikha	17927
Krasnogorsky District	Красногорский район	selo of Krasnogorskoye	16228
Krasnoshchyokovsky District	Краснощёковский район	selo of Krasnoshchyokovo	19251
Krutikhinsky District	Крутихинский район	selo of Krutikha	11301
Kulundinsky District	Кулундинский район	selo of Kulunda	23000
Kuryinsky District	Курьинский район	selo of Kurya	11079
Kytmanovsky District	Кытмановский район	selo of Kytmanovo	13896
Loktevsky District	Локтевский район	town of Gornyak	29658
Mamontovsky District	Мамонтовский район	selo of Mamontovo	23412
Mikhaylovsky District	Михайловский район	selo of Mikhaylovskoye	21211
Nemetsky National District	Немецкий национальный район	selo of Galbshtadt	17668
Novichikhinsky District	Новичихинский район	selo of Novichikha	9938
Pankrushikhinsky District	Панкрушихинский район	selo of Pankrushikha	13364
Pavlovsky District	Павловский район	selo of Pavlovsk	40235
Pervomaysky District	Первомайский район	town of Novoaltaysk	50100
Petropavlovsky District	Петропавловский район	selo of Petropavlovskoye	12450
Pospelikhinsky District	Поспелихинский район	selo of Pospelikha	24788
Rebrikhinsky District	Ребрихинский район	selo of Rebrikha	24559
Rodinsky District	Родинский район	selo of Rodino	20719
Romanovsky District	Романовский район	selo of Romanovo	13179
Rubtsovsky District	Рубцовский район	city of Rubtsovsk	24556
Shelabolikhinsky District	Шелаболихинский район	selo of Shelabolikha	13678
Shipunovsky District	Шипуновский район	selo of Shipunovo	33285
Smolensky District	Смоленский район	selo of Smolenskoye	23955
Soloneshensky District	Солонешенский район	selo of Soloneshnoye	10720
Soltonsky District	Солтонский район	selo of Solton	8610
Sovetsky District	Советский район	selo of Sovetskoye	16467
Suyetsky District	Суетский район	selo of Verkh-Suyetka	5120
Tabunsky District	Табунский район	selo of Tabuny	10057
Talmensky District	Тальменский район	work settlement of Talmenka	46770
Togulsky District	Тогульский район	selo of Togul	8478
Topchikhinsky District	Топчихинский район	selo of Topchikha	23350
Tretyakovsky District	Третьяковский район	selo of Staroaleyskoye	14197
Troitsky District	Троицкий район	selo of Troitskoye	24868
Tselinny District	Целинный район	selo of Tselinnoye	16403
Tyumentsevsky District	Тюменцевский район	selo of Tyumentsevo	15695
Uglovsky District	Угловский район	selo of Uglovskoye	13888
Ust-Kalmansky District	Усть-Калманский район	selo of Ust-Kalmanka	15365
Ust-Pristansky District	Усть-Пристанский район	selo of Ust-Charyshskaya Pristan	13409
Volchikhinsky District	Волчихинский район	selo of Volchikha	19703
Yegoryevsky District	Егорьевский район	selo of Novoyegoryevskoye	14170
Yeltsovsky District	Ельцовский район	selo of Yeltsovka	6339
Zalesovsky District	Залесовский район	selo of Zalesovo	15074
Zarinsky District	Заринский район	town of Zarinsk	20136
Zavyalovsky District	Завьяловский район	selo of Zavyalovo	19305
Zmeinogorsky District	Змеиногорский район	town of Zmeinogorsk	21022
Zonalny District	Зональный район	selo of Zonalnoye	19676

=== Altai Republic ===
District	Russian name	Altai name	Administrative center	Population (2010 Census)
Chemalsky District	Чемальский район	Чамал аймак Çamal aymak	selo of Chemal	9441
Choysky District	Чойский район	Чоо аймак Çoo aymak	selo of Choya	8348
Kosh-Agachsky District	Кош-Агачский район	Кош-Агаш аймак Koş-Agaş aymak	selo of Kosh-Agach	18263
Mayminsky District	Майминский район	Майма аймак Mayma aymak	selo of Mayma	28642
Ongudaysky District	Онгудайский район	Оҥдой аймак Oñdoy aymak	selo of Onguday	15046
Shebalinsky District	Шебалинский район	Шабалин аймак Şabalin aymak	selo of Shebalino	13596
Turochaksky District	Турочакский район	Турачак аймак Turaçak aymak	selo of Turochak	12484
Ulagansky District	Улаганский район	Улаган аймак Ulagan aymak	selo of Ulagan	11388
Ust-Kansky District	Усть-Канский район	Кан-Оозы аймак Kan-Oozı aymak	selo of Ust-Kan	15007
Ust-Koksinsky District	Усть-Коксинский район	Кӧк-Суу Оозы аймак Kök-Suu Oozı aymak	selo of Ust-Koksa	17020

=== Amur Oblast ===
District	Russian name	Administrative center	Population (2010 Census)
Arkharinsky District	Архаринский район	work settlement of Arkhara	17186
Belogorsky District	Белогорский район	town of Belogorsk	20052
Blagoveshchensky District	Благовещенский район	city of Blagoveshchensk	19641
Bureysky District	Бурейский район	work settlement of Novobureysky	24021
Ivanovsky District	Ивановский район	selo of Ivanovka	26509
Konstantinovsky District	Константиновский район	selo of Konstantinovka	12986
Magdagachinsky District	Магдагачинский район	work settlement of Magdagachi	22671
Mazanovsky District	Мазановский район	selo of Novokiyevsky Uval	14803
Mikhaylovsky District	Михайловский район	selo of Poyarkovo	14850
Oktyabrsky District	Октябрьский район	selo of Yekaterinoslavka	19679
Romnensky District	Ромненский район	selo of Romny	9401
Selemdzhinsky District	Селемджинский район	work settlement of Ekimchan	11639
Seryshevsky District	Серышевский район	work settlement of Seryshevo	25725
Shimanovsky District	Шимановский район	town of Shimanovsk	5956
Skovorodinsky District	Сковородинский район	town of Skovorodino	29558
Svobodnensky District	Свободненский район	town of Svobodny	14315
Tambovsky District	Тамбовский район	selo of Tambovka	22671
Tyndinsky District	Тындинский район	town of Tynda	16065
Zavitinsky District	Завитинский район	town of Zavitinsk	15970
Zeysky District	Зейский район	town of Zeya	16847

=== Arkhangelsk Oblast ===
District	Russian name	Administrative center	Population (2010 Census)	Notes on municipal incorporation
Kargopolsky District	Каргопольский район	town of Kargopol	18466	
Kholmogorsky District	Холмогорский район	selo of Kholmogory	25061	
Konoshsky District	Коношский район	work settlement of Konosha	26106	
Kotlassky District	Котласский район	town of Kotlas	21005	
Krasnoborsky District	Красноборский район	selo of Krasnoborsk	13815	
Lensky District	Ленский район	selo of Yarensk	13362	
Leshukonsky District	Лешуконский район	selo of Leshukonskoye	7979	
Mezensky District	Мезенский район	town of Mezen	10330	
Novaya Zemlya District	Новая Земля район	work settlement of Belushya Guba	2429	Incorporated as Novaya Zemlya Urban Okrug
Nyandomsky District	Няндомский район	town of Nyandoma	30244	
Onezhsky District	Онежский район	town of Onega	14017	
Pinezhsky District	Пинежский район	selo of Karpogory	26978	
Plesetsky District	Плесецкий район	work settlement of Plesetsk	49077	
Primorsky District	Приморский район	city of Arkhangelsk	25466	Primorsky Municipal District includes territories of both Primorsky and Solovetsky administrative districts
Shenkursky District	Шенкурский район	town of Shenkursk	15196	
Solovetsky District	Соловецкий район	settlement of Solovetsky	861	Incorporated as Solovetskoye Rural Settlement within Primorsky Municipal District
Ustyansky District	Устьянский район	work settlement of Oktyabrsky	30581	
Velsky District	Вельский район	town of Velsk	54792	
Verkhnetoyemsky District	Верхнетоемский район	selo of Verkhnyaya Toyma	17060	
Vilegodsky District	Вилегодский район	selo of Ilyinsko-Podomskoye	11158	
Vinogradovsky District	Виноградовский район	work settlement of Bereznik	16753	

=== Astrakhan Oblast ===
District	Russian name	Administrative center	Population (2010 Census)
Akhtubinsky District	Ахтубинский район	town of Akhtubinsk	29326
Chernoyarsky District	Черноярский район	selo of Chyorny Yar	20220
Ikryaninsky District	Икрянинский район	selo of Ikryanoye	47759
Kamyzyaksky District	Камызякский район	town of Kamyzyak	48647
Kharabalinsky District	Харабалинский район	town of Kharabali	41176
Krasnoyarsky District	Красноярский район	selo of Krasny Yar	35615
Limansky District	Лиманский район	work settlement of Liman	31952
Narimanovsky District	Наримановский район	town of Narimanov	45457
Privolzhsky District	Приволжский район	selo of Nachalovo	43647
Volodarsky District	Володарский район	settlement of Volodarsky	47825
Yenotayevsky District	Енотаевский район	selo of Yenotayevka	26786

=== Republic of Bashkortostan ===
District	Russian name	Bashkir name	Administrative center	Population (2010 Census)
Abzelilovsky District	Абзелиловский район	Әбйәлил районы	selo of Askarovo	45551
Alsheyevsky District	Альшеевский район	Әлшәй районы	selo of Rayevsky	43647
Arkhangelsky District	Архангельский район	Архангел районы	selo of Arkhangelskoye	18514
Askinsky District	Аскинский район	Асҡын районы	selo of Askino	21272
Aurgazinsky District	Аургазинский район	Ауырғазы районы	selo of Tolbazy	36970
Bakalinsky District	Бакалинский район	Баҡалы районы	selo of Bakaly	28776
Baltachevsky District	Балтачевский район	Балтас районы	selo of Starobaltachevo	21623
Baymaksky District	Баймакский район	Баймаҡ районы	town of Baymak	40862
Belebeyevsky District	Белебеевский район	Бәләбәй районы	town of Belebey	41708
Belokataysky District	Белокатайский район	Балаҡатай районы	selo of Novobelokatay	20169
Beloretsky District	Белорецкий район	Белорет районы	town of Beloretsk	38442
Birsky District	Бирский район	Бөрө районы	town of Birsk	17924
Bizhbulyaksky District	Бижбулякский район	Бишбүләк районы	selo of Bizhbulyak	26080
Blagovarsky District	Благоварский район	Благовар районы	selo of Yazykovo	26004
Blagoveshchensky District	Благовещенский район	Благовещен районы	town of Blagoveshchensk	15497
Burayevsky District	Бураевский район	Борай районы	selo of Burayevo	25154
Burzyansky District	Бурзянский район	Бөрйән районы	selo of Starosubkhangulovo	16698
Buzdyaksky District	Буздякский район	Бүздәк районы	selo of Buzdyak	30688
Chekmagushevsky District	Чекмагушевский район	Саҡмағош районы	selo of Chekmagush	30780
Chishminsky District	Чишминский район	Шишмә районы	work settlement of Chishmy	52344
Davlekanovsky District	Давлекановский район	Дәүләкән районы	town of Davlekanovo	18392
Duvansky District	Дуванский район	Дыуан районы	selo of Mesyagutovo	31068
Dyurtyulinsky District	Дюртюлинский район	Дүртөйлө районы	town of Dyurtyuli	32701
Fyodorovsky District	Фёдоровский район	Федоровка районы	selo of Fyodorovka	18650
Gafuriysky District	Гафурийский район	Ғафури районы	selo of Krasnousolsky	33869
Iglinsky District	Иглинский район	Иглин районы	selo of Iglino	49675
Ilishevsky District	Илишевский район	Илеш районы	selo of Verkhneyarkeyevo	34654
Ishimbaysky District	Ишимбайский район	Ишембай районы	town of Ishimbay	25042
Kaltasinsky District	Калтасинский район	Ҡалтасы районы	selo of Kaltasy	26268
Karaidelsky District	Караидельский район	Ҡариҙел районы	selo of Karaidel	27945
Karmaskalinsky District	Кармаскалинский район	Ҡырмыҫҡалы районы	selo of Karmaskaly	51504
Khaybullinsky District	Хайбуллинский район	Хәйбулла районы	selo of Akyar	33398
Kiginsky District	Кигинский район	Ҡыйғы районы	selo of Verkhniye Kigi	19137
Krasnokamsky District	Краснокамский район	Краснокама районы	selo of Nikolo-Beryozovka	27986
Kugarchinsky District	Кугарчинский район	Күгәрсен районы	selo of Mrakovo	31444
Kushnarenkovsky District	Кушнаренковский район	Кушнаренко районы	selo of Kushnarenkovo	27491
Kuyurgazinsky District	Куюргазинский район	Көйөргәҙе районы	selo of Yermolayevo	25125
Mechetlinsky District	Мечетлинский район	Мәсетле районы	selo of Bolsheustyikinskoye	25032
Meleuzovsky District	Мелеузовский район	Мәләүез районы	town of Meleuz	27159
Mishkinsky District	Мишкинский район	Мишкә районы	selo of Mishkino	25318
Miyakinsky District	Миякинский район	Миәкә районы	selo of Kirgiz-Miyaki	28224
Nurimanovsky District	Нуримановский район	Нуриман районы	selo of Krasnaya Gorka	20824
Salavatsky District	Салаватский район	Салауат районы	selo of Maloyaz	26566
Sharansky District	Шаранский район	Шаран районы	selo of Sharan	22514
Sterlibashevsky District	Стерлибашевский район	Стәрлебаш районы	selo of Sterlibashevo	20217
Sterlitamaksky District	Стерлитамакский район	Стәрлетамаҡ районы	city of Sterlitamak	40325
Tatyshlinsky District	Татышлинский район	Тәтешле районы	selo of Verkhniye Tatyshly	25159
Tuymazinsky District	Туймазинский район	Туймазы районы	town of Tuymazy	64389
Uchalinsky District	Учалинский район	Учалы районы	town of Uchaly	35480
Ufimsky District	Уфимский район	Өфө районы	city of Ufa	67067
Yanaulsky District	Янаульский район	Яңауыл районы	town of Yanaul	21210
Yermekeyevsky District	Ермекеевский район	Йәрмәкәй районы	selo of Yermekeyevo	17162
Zianchurinsky District	Зианчуринский район	Ейәнсура районы	selo of Isyangulovo	27626
Zilairsky District	Зилаирский район	Йылайыр районы	selo of Zilair	16590

=== Belgorod Oblast ===
District	Russian name	Administrative center	Population (2010 Census)	Notes on municipal incorporation
Alexeyevsky District	Алексеевский район	town of Alexeyevka	25425	
Belgorodsky District	Белгородский район	settlement of Maysky	108778	
Borisovsky District	Борисовский район	settlement of Borisovka	26252	
Chernyansky District	Чернянский район	settlement of Chernyanka	32647	
Grayvoronsky District	Грайворонский район	town of Grayvoron	29137	
Gubkinsky District	Губкинский район	town of Gubkin	33561	Incorporated as Gubkinsky Urban Okrug
Ivnyansky District	Ивнянский район	settlement of Ivnya	23570	
Korochansky District	Корочанский район	town of Korocha	38695	
Krasnensky District	Красненский район	selo of Krasnoye	13371	
Krasnogvardeysky District	Красногвардейский район	town of Biryuch	40636	
Krasnoyaruzhsky District	Краснояружский район	settlement of Krasnaya Yaruga	14891	
Novooskolsky District	Новооскольский район	town of Novy Oskol	43396	
Prokhorovsky District	Прохоровский район	settlement of Prokhorovka	30094	
Rakityansky District	Ракитянский район	work settlement of Rakitnoye	33935	
Rovensky District	Ровеньский район	work settlement of Rovenki	24060	
Shebekinsky District	Шебекинский район	town of Shebekino	47889	
Starooskolsky District	Старооскольский район	city of Stary Oskol	35457	Incorporated as Starooskolsky Urban Okrug
Valuysky District	Валуйский район	town of Valuyki	33845	
Veydelevsky District	Вейделевский район	settlement of Veydelevka	21670	
Volokonovsky District	Волоконовский район	work settlement of Volokonovka	32769	
Yakovlevsky District	Яковлевский район	town of Stroitel	57774	

=== Bryansk Oblast ===
District	Russian name	Administrative center	Population (2010 Census)
Brasovsky District	Брасовский район	work settlement of Lokot	21471
Bryansky District	Брянский район	selo of Glinishchevo	56496
Dubrovsky District	Дубровский район	work settlement of Dubrovka	20094
Dyatkovsky District	Дятьковский район	town of Dyatkovo	73935
Gordeyevsky District	Гордеевский район	selo of Gordeyevka	12218
Karachevsky District	Карачевский район	town of Karachev	36036
Kletnyansky District	Клетнянский район	work settlement of Kletnya	20166
Klimovsky District	Климовский район	work settlement of Klimovo	30003
Klintsovsky District	Клинцовский район	town of Klintsy	20503
Komarichsky District	Комаричский район	work settlement of Komarichi	18064
Krasnogorsky District	Красногорский район	work settlement of Krasnaya Gora	13208
Mglinsky District	Мглинский район	town of Mglin	19458
Navlinsky District	Навлинский район	work settlement of Navlya	28341
Novozybkovsky District	Новозыбковский район	town of Novozybkov	12415
Pochepsky District	Почепский район	town of Pochep	42365
Pogarsky District	Погарский район	work settlement of Pogar	28333
Rognedinsky District	Рогнединский район	work settlement of Rognedino	7284
Sevsky District	Севский район	town of Sevsk	16923
Starodubsky District	Стародубский район	town of Starodub	40414
Surazhsky District	Суражский район	town of Surazh	24623
Suzemsky District	Суземский район	work settlement of Suzemka	16654
Trubchevsky District	Трубчевский район	town of Trubchevsk	37002
Unechsky District	Унечский район	town of Unecha	40682
Vygonichsky District	Выгоничский район	work settlement of Vygonichi	20105
Zhiryatinsky District	Жирятинский район	selo of Zhiryatino	7442
Zhukovsky District	Жуковский район	town of Zhukovka	36983
Zlynkovsky District	Злынковский район	town of Zlynka	12917

=== Republic of Buryatia ===
District	Russian name	Buryat name	Administrative center	Population (2010 Census)
Barguzinsky District	Баргузинский район	Баргажанай аймаг	selo of Barguzin	23598
Bauntovsky District	Баунтовский район	Бабанта (Баунтын) аймаг	selo of Bagdarin	9667
Bichursky District	Бичурский район	Бэшүүрэй аймаг	selo of Bichura	25352
Dzhidinsky District	Джидинский район	Зэдын аймаг	selo of Petropavlovka	29352
Ivolginsky District	Иволгинский район	Эбилгын аймаг	selo of Ivolginsk	37983
Kabansky District	Кабанский район	Хабаансхын аймаг	selo of Kabansk	59883
Khorinsky District	Хоринский район	Хориин аймаг	selo of Khorinsk	18467
Kizhinginsky District	Кижингинский район	Хэжэнгын аймаг	selo of Kizhinga	16509
Kurumkansky District	Курумканский район	Хурамхаанай аймаг	selo of Kurumkan	15007
Kyakhtinsky District	Кяхтинский район	Хяагтын аймаг	town of Kyakhta	39785
Mukhorshibirsky District	Мухоршибирский район	Мухар Шэбэрэй аймаг	selo of Mukhorshibir	24969
Muysky District	Муйский район	Муяын аймаг	urban-type settlement of Taksimo	13142
Okinsky District	Окинский район	Ахын аймаг	selo of Orlik	5353
Pribaykalsky District	Прибайкальский район	Байгал шадар аймаг	selo of Turuntayevo	26856
Selenginsky District	Селенгинский район	Сэлэнгын аймаг	town of Gusinoozyorsk	46427
Severo-Baykalsky District	Северо-Байкальский район	Хойто-Байгалай аймаг	urban-type settlement of Nizhneangarsk	14035
Tarbagataysky District	Тарбагатайский район	Тарбагатайн аймаг	selo of Tarbagatay	16476
Tunkinsky District	Тункинский район	Түнхэнэй аймаг	selo of Kyren	22672
Yeravninsky District	Еравнинский район	Яруунын аймаг	selo of Sosnovo-Ozerskoye	18705
Zaigrayevsky District	Заиграевский район	Загарайн аймаг	urban-type settlement of Zaigrayevo	49975
Zakamensky District	Закаменский район	Захааминай аймаг	town of Zakamensk	28453

=== Chechen Republic ===
District	Russian name	Chechen name	Administrative center	Population (2010 Census)	Notes on municipal incorporation
Achkhoy-Martanovsky District	Ачхой-Мартановский район	ТIехьа-Мартанан кӀошт	selo of Achkhoy-Martan	78505	
Groznensky District	Грозненский район	Соьлжа-ГӀалин кӀошт	selo of Tolstoy-Yurt	118347	The city of Grozny serves as the administrative center of Groznensky Municipal District
Gudermessky District	Гудермесский район	Гуьмсан кӀошт	town of Gudermes	78108	
Itum-Kalinsky District	Итум-Калинский район	Итон-Кхаьллан кӀошт	selo of Itum-Kale	5483	
Kurchaloyevsky District	Курчалоевский район	Курчалойн кӀошт	selo of Kurchaloy	114039	
Nadterechny District	Надтеречный район	Теркан кӀошт	selo of Znamenskoye	55782	
Naursky District	Наурский район	Невран кӀошт	stanitsa of Naurskaya	54752	
Nozhay-Yurtovsky District	Ножай-Юртовский район	Нажи-Йуьртан кӀошт	selo of Nozhay-Yurt	49445	
Shalinsky District	Шалинский район	Шелан кӀошт	town of Shali	115970	
Sharoysky District	Шаройский район	Шаройн кӀошт	selo of Sharoy	3094	The selo of Khimoy serves as the administrative center of Sharoysky Municipal District
Shatoysky District	Шатойский район	Шуьйтан кӀошта	selo of Shatoy	16812	
Shelkovskoy District	Шелковской район	Шелковскан кӀошт	stanitsa of Shelkovskaya	53548	
Sunzhensky District	Сунженский район	Эна-Хишкан кӀошт	selo of Sernovodskoye	20989	
Urus-Martanovsky District	Урус-Мартановский район	Хьалха-Мартанан кӀошт	town of Urus-Martan	120585	
Vedensky District	Веденский район	Веданан кӀошт	selo of Vedeno	36801	

=== Chelyabinsk Oblast ===
District	Russian name	Administrative center	Population (2010 Census)
Agapovsky District	Агаповский район	selo of Agapovka	34779
Argayashsky District	Аргаяшский район	selo of Argayash	41387
Ashinsky District	город Аша и Ашинский район	town of Asha	32898
Bredinsky District	Брединский район	settlement of Bredy	28498
Chebarkulsky District	Чебаркульский район	town of Chebarkul	29606
Chesmensky District	Чесменский район	selo of Chesma	20185
Kartalinsky District	город Карталы и Карталинский район	town of Kartaly	20256
Kaslinsky District	город Касли и Каслинский район	town of Kasli	17680
Katav-Ivanovsky District	город Катав-Ивановск и Катав-Ивановский район	town of Katav-Ivanovsk	15327
Kizilsky District	Кизильский район	selo of Kizilskoye	25876
Korkinsky District	Коркинский район	town of Korkino	24314
Krasnoarmeysky District	Красноармейский район	selo of Miasskoye	41710
Kunashaksky District	Кунашакский район	selo of Kunashak	30112
Kusinsky District	Кусинский район	town of Kusa	29392
Nagaybaksky District	Нагайбакский район	selo of Fershampenuaz	20927
Nyazepetrovsky District	Нязепетровский район	town of Nyazepetrovsk	18261
Oktyabrsky District	Октябрьский район	selo of Oktyabrskoye	21097
Plastovsky District	Пластовский район	town of Plast	8624
Satkinsky District	город Сатка и Саткинский район	town of Satka	39371
Sosnovsky District	Сосновский район	selo of Dolgoderevenskoye	60941
Troitsky District	Троицкий район	town of Troitsk	28059
Uvelsky District	Увельский район	settlement of Uvelsky	31867
Uysky District	Уйский район	selo of Uyskoye	26184
Varnensky District	Варненский район	selo of Varna	27357
Verkhneuralsky District	Верхнеуральский район	town of Verkhneuralsk	36198
Yemanzhelinsky District	Еманжелинский район	town of Yemanzhelinsk	21868
Yetkulsky District	Еткульский район	selo of Yetkul	30697

=== Chukotka Autonomous Okrug ===
District	Russian name	Administrative center	Population (2010 Census)
Anadyrsky District	Анадырский район	town of Anadyr	6935
Bilibinsky District	Билибинский район	town of Bilibino	7866
Chaunsky District	Чаунский район	town of Pevek	5148
Chukotsky District	Чукотский район	selo of Lavrentiya	4838
Iultinsky District	Иультинский район	urban-type settlement of Egvekinot	4329
Providensky District	Провиденский район	urban-type settlement of Provideniya	3923

=== Chuvash Republic ===
District	Russian name	Administrative center	Population (2010 Census)
Alatyrsky District	Алатырский район	town of Alatyr	17244
Alikovsky District	Аликовский район	selo of Alikovo	18282
Batyrevsky District	Батыревский район	selo of Batyrevo	38620
Cheboksarsky District	Чебоксарский район	urban-type settlement of Kugesi	62920
Ibresinsky District	Ибресинский район	urban-type settlement of Ibresi	26192
Kanashsky District	Канашский район	town of Kanash	39708
Komsomolsky District	Комсомольский район	selo of Komsomolskoye	26951
Kozlovsky District	Козловский район	town of Kozlovka	21649
Krasnoarmeysky District	Красноармейский район	selo of Krasnoarmeyskoye	16036
Krasnochetaysky District	Красночетайский район	selo of Krasnye Chetai	16941
Mariinsko-Posadsky District	Мариинско-Посадский район	town of Mariinsky Posad	23895
Morgaushsky District	Моргаушский район	selo of Morgaushi	34884
Poretsky District	Порецкий район	selo of Poretskoye	13992
Shemurshinsky District	Шемуршинский район	selo of Shemursha	14759
Shumerlinsky District	Шумерлинский район	town of Shumerlya	10765
Tsivilsky District	Цивильский район	town of Tsivilsk	36772
Urmarsky District	Урмарский район	urban-type settlement of Urmary	25189
Vurnarsky District	Вурнарский район	urban-type settlement of Vurnary	35850
Yadrinsky District	Ядринский район	town of Yadrin	29965
Yalchiksky District	Яльчикский район	selo of Yalchiki	20452
Yantikovsky District	Янтиковский район	selo of Yantikovo	16421

=== Republic of Crimea ===
District	Russian name	Administrative center	Population (2013 est.)
Bakhchisaraysky District	Бахчисарайский район	town of Bakhchisaray	91054
Belogorsky District	Белогорский район	town of Belogorsk	64166
Chernomorsky District	Черноморский район	urban-type settlement of Chernomorskoye	32109
Dzhankoysky District	Джанкойский район	town of Dzhankoy	74131
Kirovsky District	Кировский район	urban-type settlement of Kirovskoye	53961
Krasnogvardeysky District	Красногвардейский район	urban-type settlement of Krasnogvardeyskoye	91120
Krasnoperekopsky District	Красноперекопский район	town of Krasnoperekopsk	29540
Leninsky District	Ленинский район	urban-type settlement of Lenino	63041
Nizhnegorsky District	Нижнегорский район	urban-type settlement of Nizhnegorsky	50567
Pervomaysky District	Первомайский район	urban-type settlement of Pervomayskoye	35537
Razdolnensky District	Раздольненский район	urban-type settlement of Razdolnoye	34360
Saksky District	Сакский район	town of Saki	78025
Simferopolsky District	Симферопольский район	city of Simferopol	158375
Sovetsky District	Советский район	urban-type settlement of Sovetsky	34277

=== Republic of Dagestan ===
District	Russian name	Administrative center	Population (2010 Census)
Agulsky District	Агульский район	selo of Tpig	11204
Akhtynsky District	Ахтынский район	selo of Akhty	32604
Akhvakhsky District	Ахвахский район	selo of Karata	22014
Akushinsky District	Акушинский район	selo of Akusha	53558
Babayurtovsky District	Бабаюртовский район	selo of Babayurt	45701
Botlikhsky District	Ботлихский район	selo of Botlikh	54322
Buynaksky District	Буйнакский район	town of Buynaksk	73402
Charodinsky District	Чародинский район	selo of Tsurib	11777
Dakhadayevsky District	Дахадаевский район	selo of Urkarakh	36709
Derbentsky District	Дербентский район	city of Derbent	99054
Dokuzparinsky District	Докузпаринский район	selo of Usukhchay	15357
Gergebilsky District	Гергебильский район	selo of Gergebil	19910
Gumbetovsky District	Гумбетовский район	selo of Mekhelta	22046
Gunibsky District	Гунибский район	selo of Gunib	25303
Karabudakhkentsky District	Карабудахкентский район	selo of Karabudakhkent	73016
Kayakentsky District	Каякентский район	selo of Novokayakent	54089
Kaytagsky District	Кайтагский район	selo of Madzhalis	31368
Kazbekovsky District	Казбековский район	selo of Dylym	42752
Khasavyurtovsky District	Хасавюртовский район	city of Khasavyurt	141232
Khivsky District	Хивский район	selo of Khiv	22753
Khunzakhsky District	Хунзахский район	selo of Khunzakh	31691
Kizilyurtovsky District	Кизилюртовский район	town of Kizilyurt	61876
Kizlyarsky District	Кизлярский район	town of Kizlyar	67287
Kulinsky District	Кулинский район	selo of Vachi	11174
Kumtorkalinsky District	Кумторкалинский район	selo of Korkmaskala	24848
Kurakhsky District	Курахский район	selo of Kurakh	18669
Laksky District	Лакский район	selo of Kumukh	12161
Levashinsky District	Левашинский район	selo of Levashi	70704
Magaramkentsky District	Магарамкентский район	selo of Magaramkent	62195
Nogaysky District	Ногайский район	selo of Terekli-Mekteb	22472
Novolaksky District	Новолакский район	selo of Novolakskoye	28556
Rutulsky District	Рутульский район	selo of Rutul	22926
Sergokalinsky District	Сергокалинский район	selo of Sergokala	27133
Shamilsky District	Шамильский район	selo of Khebda	28122
Suleyman-Stalsky District	Сулейман-Стальский район	selo of Kasumkent	58835
Tabasaransky District	Табасаранский район	selo of Khuchni	52886
Tarumovsky District	Тарумовский район	selo of Tarumovka	31683
Tlyaratinsky District	Тляратинский район	selo of Tlyarata	22165
Tsumadinsky District	Цумадинский район	selo of Agvali	23345
Tsuntinsky District	Цунтинский район	selo of Tsunta	18282
Untsukulsky District	Унцукульский район	selo of Untsukul	29547

=== Republic of Ingushetia ===
District	Russian name	Administrative center	Population (2010 Census)
Dzheyrakhsky District	Джейрахский район	selo of Dzheyrakh	2638
Malgobeksky District	Малгобекский район	town of Malgobek	47754
Nazranovsky District	Назрановский район	town of Nazran	87851
Sunzhensky District	Сунженский район	stanitsa of Ordzhonikidzevskaya	116470

=== Irkutsk Oblast ===
District	Russian name	Administrative center	Population (2010 Census)
Alarsky District	Аларский район	settlement of Kutulik	21479
Angarsky District	Ангарский район	city of Angarsk	12010
Balagansky District	Балаганский район	work settlement of Balagansk	9194
Bayandayevsky District	Баяндаевский район	selo of Bayanday	11529
Bodaybinsky District	Бодайбинский район	town of Bodaybo	7887
Bokhansky District	Боханский район	settlement of Bokhan	25398
Bratsky District	Братский район	city of Bratsk	56878
Cheremkhovsky District	Черемховский район	town of Cheremkhovo	30114
Chunsky District	Чунский район	work settlement of Chunsky	36516
Ekhirit-Bulagatsky District	Эхирит-Булагатский район	settlement of Ust-Ordynsky	30597
Irkutsky District	Иркутский район	city of Irkutsk	84322
Kachugsky District	Качугский район	work settlement of Kachug	17388
Katangsky District	Катангский район	selo of Yerbogachen	3779
Kazachinsko-Lensky District	Казачинско-Ленский район	selo of Kazachinskoye	18829
Kirensky District	Киренский район	town of Kirensk	20322
Kuytunsky District	Куйтунский район	work settlement of Kuytun	31856
Mamsko-Chuysky District	Мамско-Чуйский район	work settlement of Mama	5501
Nizhneilimsky District	Нижнеилимский район	town of Zheleznogorsk-Ilimsky	55096
Nizhneudinsky District	Нижнеудинский район	town of Nizhneudinsk	25694
Nukutsky District	Нукутский район	settlement of Novonukutsky	15743
Olkhonsky District	Ольхонский район	selo of Yelantsy	9446
Osinsky District	Осинский район	selo of Osa	20431
Shelekhovsky District	Шелеховский район	town of Shelekhov	14435
Slyudyansky District	Слюдянский район	town of Slyudyanka	40509
Tayshetsky District	Тайшетский район	town of Tayshet	29752
Tulunsky District	Тулунский район	town of Tulun	27285
Usolsky District	Усольский район	town of Usolye-Sibirskoye	50334
Ust-Ilimsky District	Усть-Илимский район	town of Ust-Ilimsk	18589
Ust-Kutsky District	Усть-Кутский район	town of Ust-Kut	8416
Ust-Udinsky District	Усть-Удинский район	work settlement of Ust-Uda	14385
Zalarinsky District	Заларинский район	work settlement of Zalari	28229
Zhigalovsky District	Жигаловский район	work settlement of Zhigalovo	9340
Ziminsky District	Зиминский район	town of Zima	13383

=== Ivanovo Oblast ===
District	Russian name	Administrative center	Population (2010 Census)
Furmanovsky District	Фурмановский район	town of Furmanov	6733
Gavrilovo-Posadsky District	Гаврилово-Посадский район	town of Gavrilov Posad	17591
Ilyinsky District	Ильинский район	settlement of Ilyinskoye-Khovanskoye	9703
Ivanovsky District	Ивановский район	city of Ivanovo	66398
Kineshemsky District	Кинешемский район	town of Kineshma	23258
Komsomolsky District	Комсомольский район	town of Komsomolsk	20263
Lezhnevsky District	Лежневский район	settlement of Lezhnevo	19001
Lukhsky District	Лухский район	settlement of Lukh	9273
Palekhsky District	Палехский район	settlement of Palekh	10884
Pestyakovsky District	Пестяковский район	settlement of Pestyaki	7160
Privolzhsky District	Приволжский район	town of Privolzhsk	26327
Puchezhsky District	Пучежский район	town of Puchezh	13863
Rodnikovsky District	Родниковский район	town of Rodniki	35846
Savinsky District	Савинский район	settlement of Savino	12079
Shuysky District	Шуйский район	town of Shuya	21682
Teykovsky District	Тейковский район	town of Teykovo	12232
Verkhnelandekhovsky District	Верхнеландеховский район	settlement of Verkhny Landekh	5348
Vichugsky District	Вичугский район	town of Vichuga	20201
Yuryevetsky District	Юрьевецкий район	town of Yuryevets	15930
Yuzhsky District	Южский район	town of Yuzha	25728
Zavolzhsky District	Заволжский район	town of Zavolzhsk	18468

=== Jewish Autonomous Oblast ===
District	Russian name	Administrative center	Population (2010 Census)
Birobidzhansky District	Биробиджанский район	town of Birobidzhan	11907
Leninsky District	Ленинский район	selo of Leninskoye	20684
Obluchensky District	Облученский район	town of Obluchye	29035
Oktyabrsky District	Октябрьский район	selo of Amurzet	11354
Smidovichsky District	Смидовичский район	settlement of Smidovich	28165

=== Kabardino-Balkar Republic ===
District	Russian name	Administrative center	Population (2010 Census)
Baksansky District	Баксанский район	town of Baksan	60970
Chegemsky District	Чегемский район	town of Chegem	69092
Chereksky District	Черекский район	settlement of Kashkhatau	26956
Elbrussky District	Эльбрусский район	town of Tyrnyauz	36260
Leskensky District	Лескенский район	selo of Anzorey	27840
Maysky District	Майский район	town of Maysky	38625
Prokhladnensky District	Прохладненский район	town of Prokhladny	45533
Tersky District	Терский район	town of Terek	51220
Urvansky District	Урванский район	town of Nartkala	71782
Zolsky District	Зольский район	settlement of Zalukokoazhe	48939

=== Kaliningrad Oblast ===
District	Russian name	Administrative center	Population (2010 Census)	Notes on municipal incorporation
Bagrationovsky District	Багратионовский район	town of Bagrationovsk	32352	
Baltiysky District	Балтийский район	town of Baltiysk	36047	
Chernyakhovsky District	Черняховский район	town of Chernyakhovsk	51936	
Guryevsky District	Гурьевский район	town of Guryevsk	52988	Incorporated as Guryevsky Urban Okrug
Gusevsky District	Гусевский район	town of Gusev	37142	Incorporated as Gusevsky Urban Okrug
Gvardeysky District	Гвардейский район	town of Gvardeysk	29926	
Krasnoznamensky District	Краснознаменский район	town of Krasnoznamensk	12905	
Nemansky District	Неманский район	town of Neman	20132	
Nesterovsky District	Нестеровский район	town of Nesterov	16213	
Ozyorsky District	Озёрский район	town of Ozyorsk	15316	Incorporated as Ozyorsky Urban Okrug
Polessky District	Полесский район	town of Polessk	19205	
Pravdinsky District	Правдинский район	town of Pravdinsk	19061	
Slavsky District	Славский район	town of Slavsk	21015	
Svetlogorsky District	Светлогорский район	town of Svetlogorsk	14875	
Zelenogradsky District	Зеленоградский район	town of Zelenogradsk	32271	

=== Republic of Kalmykia ===
District	Russian name	Administrative center	Population (2010 Census)
Chernozemelsky District	Черноземельский район	settlement of Komsomolsky	13258
Gorodovikovsky District	Городовиковский район	town of Gorodovikovsk	17295
Iki-Burulsky District	Ики-Бурульский район	settlement of Iki-Burul	11424
Ketchenerovsky District	Кетченеровский район	settlement of Ketchenery	10622
Lagansky District	Лаганский район	town of Lagan	20089
Maloderbetovsky District	Малодербетовский район	selo of Malye Derbety	10528
Oktyabrsky District	Октябрьский район	settlement of Bolshoy Tsaryn	9438
Priyutnensky District	Приютненский район	selo of Priyutnoye	11658
Sarpinsky District	Сарпинский район	selo of Sadovoye	13796
Tselinny District	Целинный район	selo of Troitskoye	20051
Yashaltinsky District	Яшалтинский район	selo of Yashalta	17178
Yashkulsky District	Яшкульский район	settlement of Yashkul	15270
Yustinsky District	Юстинский район	settlement of Tsagan Aman	10585

=== Kaluga Oblast ===
District	Russian name	Administrative center	Population (2010 Census)
Babyninsky District	Бабынинский район	settlement of Babynino	21041
Baryatinsky District	Барятинский район	selo of Baryatino	6340
Borovsky District	Боровский район	town of Borovsk	61401
Duminichsky District	Думиничский район	settlement of Duminichi	15261
Dzerzhinsky District	Дзержинский район	town of Kondrovo	60377
Ferzikovsky District	Ферзиковский район	settlement of Ferzikovo	15789
Iznoskovsky District	Износковский район	selo of Iznoski	7011
Khvastovichsky District	Хвастовичский район	selo of Khvastovichi	10852
Kirovsky District	Кировский район	town of Kirov	42105
Kozelsky District	Козельский район	town of Kozelsk	41802
Kuybyshevsky District	Куйбышевский район	settlement of Betlitsa	7831
Lyudinovsky District	Людиновский район	town of Lyudinovo	45041
Maloyaroslavetsky District	Малоярославецкий район	town of Maloyaroslavets	54269
Medynsky District	Медынский район	town of Medyn	13347
Meshchovsky District	Мещовский район	town of Meshchovsk	12161
Mosalsky District	Мосальский район	town of Mosalsk	9094
Peremyshlsky District	Перемышльский район	selo of Peremyshl	14137
Spas-Demensky District	Спас-Деменский район	town of Spas-Demensk	8238
Sukhinichsky District	Сухиничский район	town of Sukhinichi	25427
Tarussky District	Тарусский район	town of Tarusa	15255
Ulyanovsky District	Ульяновский район	selo of Ulyanovo	7636
Yukhnovsky District	Юхновский район	town of Yukhnov	12696
Zhizdrinsky District	Жиздринский район	town of Zhizdra	10593
Zhukovsky District	Жуковский район	town of Zhukov	48999

=== Kamchatka Krai ===
District	Russian name	Administrative center	Population (2010 Census)
Aleutsky District	Алеутский район	selo of Nikolskoye	676
Bystrinsky District	Быстринский район	selo of Esso	2560
Karaginsky District	Карагинский район	settlement of Ossora	4076
Milkovsky District	Мильковский район	selo of Milkovo	10585
Olyutorsky District	Олюторский район	selo of Tilichiki	5036
Penzhinsky District	Пенжинский район	selo of Kamenskoye	2340
Sobolevsky District	Соболевский район	selo of Sobolevo	2604
Tigilsky District	Тигильский район	selo of Tigil	7307
Ust-Bolsheretsky District	Усть-Большерецкий район	selo of Ust-Bolsheretsk	8331
Ust-Kamchatsky District	Усть-Камчатский район	settlement of Ust-Kamchatsk	11744
Yelizovsky District	Елизовский район	town of Yelizovo	24566

=== Karachay-Cherkess Republic ===
District	Russian name	Administrative center	Population (2010 Census)
Abazinsky District	Абазинский район	aul of Inzhich-Chukun	17069
Adyge-Khablsky District	Адыге-Хабльский район	aul of Adyge-Khabl	16186
Karachayevsky District	Карачаевский район	town of Karachayevsk	30376
Khabezsky District	Хабезский район	aul of Khabez	30356
Malokarachayevsky District	Малокарачаевский район	selo of Uchkeken	43318
Nogaysky District	Ногайский район	settlement of Erken-Shakhar	15659
Prikubansky District	Прикубанский район	settlement of Kavkazsky	29343
Urupsky District	Урупский район	stanitsa of Pregradnaya	24404
Ust-Dzhegutinsky District	Усть-Джегутинский район	town of Ust-Dzheguta	50641
Zelenchuksky District	Зеленчукский район	stanitsa of Zelenchukskaya	51780

=== Republic of Karelia ===
District	Russian name	Administrative center	Population (2010 Census)
Belomorsky District	Беломорский район	town of Belomorsk	19118
Kalevalsky District	Калевальский район	urban-type settlement of Kalevala	8321
Kemsky District	Кемский район	town of Kem	17756
Kondopozhsky District	Кондопожский район	town of Kondopoga	41114
Lakhdenpokhsky District	Лахденпохский район	town of Lakhdenpokhya	14235
Loukhsky District	Лоухский район	urban-type settlement of Loukhi	14760
Medvezhyegorsky District	Медвежьегорский район	town of Medvezhyegorsk	31864
Muyezersky District	Муезерский район	urban-type settlement of Muyezersky	12236
Olonetsky District	Олонецкий район	town of Olonets	23124
Pitkyarantsky District	Питкярантский район	town of Pitkyaranta	19895
Prionezhsky District	Прионежский район	city of Petrozavodsk	21502
Pryazhinsky District	Пряжинский район	urban-type settlement of Pryazha	14664
Pudozhsky District	Пудожский район	town of Pudozh	21659
Segezhsky District	Сегежский район	town of Segezha	41215
Suoyarvsky District	Суоярвский район	town of Suoyarvi	18814

- Note: the territory of the town of republic significance of Sortavala is incorporated as Sortavalsky Municipal District.

=== Kemerovo Oblast ===
District	Russian name	Administrative center	Population (2010 Census)	Notes on municipal incorporation
Belovsky District	Беловский район	town of Belovo	30204	
Chebulinsky District	Чебулинский район	urban-type settlement of Verkh-Chebula	16348	
Guryevsky District	Гурьевский район	town of Guryevsk	10617	
Izhmorsky District	Ижморский район	urban-type settlement of Izhmorsky	13517	
Kemerovsky District	Кемеровский район	city of Kemerovo	45459	
Krapivinsky District	Крапивинский район	urban-type settlement of Krapivinsky	24533	
Leninsk-Kuznetsky District	Ленинск-Кузнецкий район	city of Leninsk-Kuznetsky	23760	
Mariinsky District	Мариинский район	town of Mariinsk	17285	
Mezhdurechensky District	Междуреченский район	city of Mezhdurechensk	2268	Incorporated as a part of Mezhdurechensky Urban Okrug
Novokuznetsky District	Новокузнецкий район	city of Novokuznetsk	50681	
Prokopyevsky District	Прокопьевский район	city of Prokopyevsk	31442	
Promyshlennovsky District	Промышленновский район	urban-type settlement of Promyshlennaya	50106	
Tashtagolsky District	Таштагольский район	town of Tashtagol	31895	
Tisulsky District	Тисульский район	urban-type settlement of Tisul	25045	
Topkinsky District	Топкинский район	town of Topki	16246	
Tyazhinsky District	Тяжинский район	urban-type settlement of Tyazhinsky	25597	
Yashkinsky District	Яшкинский район	urban-type settlement of Yashkino	30856	
Yaysky District	Яйский район	urban-type settlement of Yaya	20383	
Yurginsky District	Юргинский район	town of Yurga	22448	

=== Khabarovsk Krai ===
District	Russian name	Administrative center	Population (2010 Census)
Amursky District	Амурский район	town of Amursk	22669
Ayano-Maysky District	Аяно-Майский район	selo of Ayan	2292
Bikinsky District	Бикинский район	town of Bikin	7264
imeni Lazo District	имени Лазо район	work settlement of Pereyaslavka	46185
imeni Poliny Osipenko District	имени Полины Осипенко район	selo of imeni Poliny Osipenko	5198
Khabarovsky District	Хабаровский район	city of Khabarovsk	85404
Komsomolsky District	Комсомольский район	city of Komsomolsk-on-Amur	29072
Nanaysky District	Нанайский район	selo of Troitskoye	17491
Nikolayevsky District	Николаевский район	town of Nikolayevsk-on-Amur	9942
Okhotsky District	Охотский район	work settlement of Okhotsk	8197
Solnechny District	Солнечный район	work settlement of Solnechny	33701
Sovetsko-Gavansky District	Советско-Гаванский район	town of Sovetskaya Gavan	15794
Tuguro-Chumikansky District	Тугуро-Чумиканский район	selo of Chumikan	2255
Ulchsky District	Ульчский район	selo of Bogorodskoye	18729
Vaninsky District	Ванинский район	work settlement of Vanino	37310
Verkhnebureinsky District	Верхнебуреинский район	work settlement of Chegdomyn	27457
Vyazemsky District	Вяземский район	town of Vyazemsky	22974

=== Republic of Khakassia ===
District	Russian name	Administrative center	Population (2010 Census)
Altaysky District	Алтайский район	selo of Bely Yar	25559
Askizsky District	Аскизский район	selo of Askiz	40912
Beysky District	Бейский район	selo of Beya	19305
Bogradsky District	Боградский район	selo of Bograd	15869
Ordzhonikidzevsky District	Орджоникидзевский район	settlement of Kopyevo	12841
Shirinsky District	Ширинский район	selo of Shira	29371
Tashtypsky District	Таштыпский район	selo of Tashtyp	16582
Ust-Abakansky District	Усть-Абаканский район	work settlement of Ust-Abakan	39397

=== Khanty-Mansi Autonomous Okrug ===
District	Russian name	Administrative center	Population (2010 Census)
Beloyarsky District	Белоярский район	town of Beloyarsky	9766
Beryozovsky District	Берёзовский район	urban-type settlement of Beryozovo	25744
Khanty-Mansiysky District	Ханты-Мансийский район	town of Khanty-Mansiysk	19362
Kondinsky District	Кондинский район	urban-type settlement of Mezhdurechensky	34494
Nefteyugansky District	Нефтеюганский район	city of Nefteyugansk	44815
Nizhnevartovsky District	Нижневартовский район	city of Nizhnevartovsk	35745
Oktyabrsky District	Октябрьский район	urban-type settlement of Oktyabrskoye	32224
Sovetsky District	Советский район	town of Sovetsky	48059
Surgutsky District	Сургутский район	city of Surgut	113515

=== Kirov Oblast ===
District	Russian name	Administrative center	Population (2010 Census)
Afanasyevsky District	Афанасьевский район	urban-type settlement of Afanasyevo	13848
Arbazhsky District	Арбажский район	urban-type settlement of Arbazh	7328
Belokholunitsky District	Белохолуницкий район	town of Belaya Kholunitsa	19890
Bogorodsky District	Богородский район	urban-type settlement of Bogorodskoye	5015
Darovskoy District	Даровской район	urban-type settlement of Darovskoy	11829
Falyonsky District	Фалёнский район	urban-type settlement of Falyonki	11138
Kiknursky District	Кикнурский район	urban-type settlement of Kiknur	9795
Kilmezsky District	Кильмезский район	urban-type settlement of Kilmez	13086
Kirovo-Chepetsky District	Кирово-Чепецкий район	town of Kirovo-Chepetsk	21317
Kotelnichsky District	Котельничский район	town of Kotelnich	15799
Kumyonsky District	Кумёнский район	urban-type settlement of Kumyony	17350
Lebyazhsky District	Лебяжский район	urban-type settlement of Lebyazhye	8700
Luzsky District	Лузский район	town of Luza	18688
Malmyzhsky District	Малмыжский район	town of Malmyzh	26757
Murashinsky District	Мурашинский район	town of Murashi	12905
Nagorsky District	Нагорский район	urban-type settlement of Nagorsk	10336
Nemsky District	Немский район	urban-type settlement of Nema	7983
Nolinsky District	Нолинский район	town of Nolinsk	20868
Omutninsky District	Омутнинский район	town of Omutninsk	44793
Oparinsky District	Опаринский район	urban-type settlement of Oparino	11795
Orichevsky District	Оричевский район	urban-type settlement of Orichi	30781
Orlovsky District	Орловский район	town of Orlov	12934
Pizhansky District	Пижанский район	urban-type settlement of Pizhanka	11242
Podosinovsky District	Подосиновский район	urban-type settlement of Podosinovets	17009
Sanchursky District	Санчурский район	urban-type settlement of Sanchursk	10080
Shabalinsky District	Шабалинский район	urban-type settlement of Leninskoye	10854
Slobodskoy District	Слободской район	town of Slobodskoy	30174
Sovetsky District	Советский район	town of Sovetsk	27302
Sunsky District	Сунский район	urban-type settlement of Suna	6784
Svechinsky District	Свечинский район	urban-type settlement of Svecha	8517
Tuzhinsky District	Тужинский район	urban-type settlement of Tuzha	7688
Uninsky District	Унинский район	urban-type settlement of Uni	9178
Urzhumsky District	Уржумский район	town of Urzhum	27075
Verkhnekamsky District	Верхнекамский район	town of Kirs	32669
Verkhoshizhemsky District	Верхошижемский район	urban-type settlement of Verkhoshizhemye	9483
Vyatskopolyansky District	Вятскополянский район	town of Vyatskiye Polyany	30659
Yaransky District	Яранский район	town of Yaransk	26899
Yuryansky District	Юрьянский район	urban-type settlement of Yurya	20128
Zuyevsky District	Зуевский район	town of Zuyevka	22586

=== Komi Republic ===
District	Russian name	Administrative center	Population (2010 Census)
Izhemsky District	Ижемский район	selo of Izhma	18771
Knyazhpogostsky District	Княжпогостский район	town of Yemva	23432
Kortkerossky District	Корткеросский район	selo of Kortkeros	19658
Koygorodsky District	Койгородский район	selo of Koygorodok	8431
Priluzsky District	Прилузский район	selo of Obyachevo	20737
Syktyvdinsky District	Сыктывдинский район	selo of Vylgort	22660
Sysolsky District	Сысольский район	selo of Vizinga	13956
Troitsko-Pechorsky District	Троицко-Печорский район	urban-type settlement of Troitsko-Pechorsk	13925
Udorsky District	Удорский район	selo of Koslan	20400
Ust-Kulomsky District	Усть-Куломский район	selo of Ust-Kulom	26858
Ust-Tsilemsky District	Усть-Цилемский район	selo of Ust-Tsilma	13036
Ust-Vymsky District	Усть-Вымский район	selo of Aykino	29474

- Note: the territories of the towns of republic significance of Pechora, Sosnogorsk, and Vuktyl are incorporated, correspondingly, as Pechora, Sosnogorsk, and Vuktyl Municipal Districts.

=== Kostroma Oblast ===
District	Russian name	Administrative center	Population (2010 Census)
Antropovsky District	Антроповский район	settlement of Antropovo	7182
Buysky District	Буйский район	town of Buy	11829
Chukhlomsky District	Чухломский район	town of Chukhloma	11346
Galichsky District	Галичский район	town of Galich	8738
Kadyysky District	Кадыйский район	urban-type settlement of Kadyy	8374
Kologrivsky District	Кологривский район	town of Kologriv	6474
Kostromskoy District	Костромской район	city of Kostroma	44524
Krasnoselsky District	Красносельский район	urban-type settlement of Krasnoye-na-Volge	17845
Makaryevsky District	Макарьевский район	town of Makaryev	15968
Manturovsky District	Мантуровский район	town of Manturovo	4978
Mezhevskoy District	Межевской район	selo of Georgiyevskoye	4461
Nerekhtsky District	Нерехтский район	town of Nerekhta	11416
Neysky District	Нейский район	town of Neya	4325
Oktyabrsky District	Октябрьский район	selo of Bogovarovo	4946
Ostrovsky District	Островский район	settlement of Ostrovskoye	12787
Parfenyevsky District	Парфеньевский район	selo of Parfenyevo	6391
Pavinsky District	Павинский район	selo of Pavino	5102
Ponazyrevsky District	Поназыревский район	urban-type settlement of Ponazyrevo	8456
Pyshchugsky District	Пыщугский район	selo of Pyshchug	5201
Sharyinsky District	Шарьинский район	town of Sharya	10390
Soligalichsky District	Солигаличский район	town of Soligalich	10265
Sudislavsky District	Судиславский район	urban-type settlement of Sudislavl	13077
Susaninsky District	Сусанинский район	urban-type settlement of Susanino	7587
Vokhomsky District	Вохомский район	settlement of Vokhma	10152

=== Krasnodar Krai ===
District	Russian name	Administrative center	Population (2010 Census)	Notes on municipal incorporation
Abinsky District	Абинский район	town of Abinsk	91909	
Anapsky District	Анапский район	town of Anapa	76904	Incorporated as a part of Anapa Urban Okrug
Apsheronsky District	Апшеронский район	town of Apsheronsk	98891	
Beloglinsky District	Белоглинский район	selo of Belaya Glina	31303	
Belorechensky District	Белореченский район	town of Belorechensk	45149	
Bryukhovetsky District	Брюховецкий район	stanitsa of Bryukhovetskaya	53028	
Dinskoy District	Динской район	stanitsa of Dinskaya	126871	
Gulkevichsky District	Гулькевичский район	town of Gulkevichi	101521	
Kalininsky District	Калининский район	stanitsa of Kalininskaya	50691	
Kanevskoy District	Каневской район	stanitsa of Kanevskaya	102624	
Kavkazsky District	Кавказский район	stanitsa of Kavkazskaya	44445	Despite being incorporated separately from the administrative district, the town of Kropotkin is a part of Kavkazsky Municipal District and serves as the latter's administrative center
Korenovsky District	Кореновский район	town of Korenovsk	85264	
Krasnoarmeysky District	Красноармейский район	stanitsa of Poltavskaya	102508	
Krylovsky District	Крыловский район	stanitsa of Krylovskaya	35930	
Krymsky District	Крымский район	town of Krymsk	74761	
Kurganinsky District	Курганинский район	town of Kurganinsk	103036	
Kushchyovsky District	Кущёвский район	stanitsa of Kushchyovskaya	67164	
Labinsky District	Лабинский район	town of Labinsk	37443	
Leningradsky District	Ленинградский район	stanitsa of Leningradskaya	63505	
Mostovsky District	Мостовский район	urban-type settlement of Mostovskoy	71178	
Novokubansky District	Новокубанский район	town of Novokubansk	86311	
Novopokrovsky District	Новопокровский район	stanitsa of Novopokrovskaya	44116	
Otradnensky District	Отрадненский район	stanitsa of Otradnaya	64862	
Pavlovsky District	Павловский район	stanitsa of Pavlovskaya	67521	
Primorsko-Akhtarsky District	Приморско-Ахтарский район	town of Primorsko-Akhtarsk	60327	
Seversky District	Северский район	stanitsa of Severskaya	112942	
Shcherbinovsky District	Щербиновский район	stanitsa of Staroshcherbinovskaya	37301	
Slavyansky District	Славянский район	town of Slavyansk-na-Kubani	65711	
Starominsky District	Староминский район	stanitsa of Starominskaya	40755	
Tbilissky District	Тбилисский район	stanitsa of Tbilisskaya	48536	
Temryuksky District	Темрюкский район	town of Temryuk	117904	
Tikhoretsky District	Тихорецкий район	town of Tikhoretsk	59106	
Timashyovsky District	Тимашёвский район	town of Timashyovsk	106130	
Tuapsinsky District	Туапсинский район	town of Tuapse	63530	
Uspensky District	Успенский район	selo of Uspenskoye	41273	
Ust-Labinsky District	Усть-Лабинский район	town of Ust-Labinsk	112900	
Vyselkovsky District	Выселковский район	stanitsa of Vyselki	60271	
Yeysky District	Ейский район	town of Yeysk	44067	

=== Krasnoyarsk Krai ===
District	Russian name	Administrative center	Population (2010 Census)
Abansky District	Абанский район	settlement of Aban	22577
Achinsky District	Ачинский район	city of Achinsk	15870
Balakhtinsky District	Балахтинский район	work settlement of Balakhta	21000
Beryozovsky District	Берёзовский район	work settlement of Beryozovka	37868
Birilyussky District	Бирилюсский район	selo of Novobirilyussy	10927
Bogotolsky District	Боготольский район	town of Bogotol	11267
Boguchansky District	Богучанский район	selo of Boguchany	47968
Bolshemurtinsky District	Большемуртинский район	work settlement of Bolshaya Murta	19115
Bolsheuluysky District	Большеулуйский район	selo of Bolshoy Uluy	7658
Dzerzhinsky District	Дзержинский район	selo of Dzerzhinskoye	14552
Evenkiysky District	Эвенкийский район	settlement of Tura	16253
Idrinsky District	Идринский район	selo of Idrinskoye	12472
Ilansky District	Иланский район	town of Ilansky	25899
Irbeysky District	Ирбейский район	selo of Irbeyskoye	16784
Kansky District	Канский район	town of Kansk	27281
Karatuzsky District	Каратузский район	selo of Karatuzskoye	16036
Kazachinsky District	Казачинский район	selo of Kazachinskoye	11430
Kezhemsky District	Кежемский район	town of Kodinsk	22072
Kozulsky District	Козульский район	work settlement of Kozulka	16689
Krasnoturansky District	Краснотуранский район	selo of Krasnoturansk	15562
Kuraginsky District	Курагинский район	work settlement of Kuragino	47690
Mansky District	Манский район	selo of Shalinskoye	16077
Minusinsky District	Минусинский район	town of Minusinsk	25872
Motyginsky District	Мотыгинский район	work settlement of Motygino	16200
Nazarovsky District	Назаровский район	town of Nazarovo	23547
Nizhneingashsky District	Нижнеингашский район	work settlement of Nizhny Ingash	33439
Novosyolovsky District	Новосёловский район	selo of Novosyolovo	14135
Partizansky District	Партизанский район	selo of Partizanskoye	10254
Pirovsky District	Пировский район	selo of Pirovskoye	7572
Rybinsky District	Рыбинский район	town of Zaozyorny	31941
Sayansky District	Саянский район	selo of Aginskoye	12002
Severo-Yeniseysky District	Северо-Енисейский район	work settlement of Severo-Yeniseysky	11119
Sharypovsky District	Шарыповский район	town of Sharypovo	15109
Shushensky District	Шушенский район	work settlement of Shushenskoye	33216
Sukhobuzimsky District	Сухобузимский район	selo of Sukhobuzimskoye	20537
Taseyevsky District	Тасеевский район	selo of Taseyevo	13255
Taymyrsky Dolgano-Nenetsky District	Таймырский Долгано-Ненецкий район	town of Dudinka	34432
Turukhansky District	Туруханский район	selo of Turukhansk	18708
Tyukhtetsky District	Тюхтетский район	selo of Tyukhtet	8858
Uyarsky District	Уярский район	town of Uyar	21932
Uzhursky District	Ужурский район	town of Uzhur	33739
Yemelyanovsky District	Емельяновский район	work settlement of Yemelyanovo	50998
Yeniseysky District	Енисейский район	town of Yeniseysk	27223
Yermakovsky District	Ермаковский район	selo of Yermakovskoye	20918

=== Kurgan Oblast ===
District	Russian name	Administrative center	Population (2010 Census)
Almenevsky District	Альменевский район	selo of Almenevo	12412
Belozersky District	Белозерский район	selo of Belozerskoye	16934
Chastoozersky District	Частоозерский район	selo of Chastoozerye	5924
Dalmatovsky District	Далматовский район	town of Dalmatovo	29476
Kargapolsky District	Каргапольский район	urban-type settlement of Kargapolye	31832
Kataysky District	Катайский район	town of Kataysk	23991
Ketovsky District	Кетовский район	selo of Ketovo	55427
Kurtamyshsky District	Куртамышский район	town of Kurtamysh	32155
Lebyazhyevsky District	Лебяжьевский район	urban-type settlement of Lebyazhye	16557
Makushinsky District	Макушинский район	town of Makushino	18116
Mishkinsky District	Мишкинский район	urban-type settlement of Mishkino	17684
Mokrousovsky District	Мокроусовский район	selo of Mokrousovo	13115
Petukhovsky District	Петуховский район	town of Petukhovo	20493
Polovinsky District	Половинский район	selo of Polovinnoye	12255
Pritobolny District	Притобольный район	selo of Glyadyanskoye	14592
Safakulevsky District	Сафакулевский район	selo of Safakulevo	13120
Shadrinsky District	Шадринский район	town of Shadrinsk	27360
Shatrovsky District	Шатровский район	selo of Shatrovo	18446
Shchuchansky District	Щучанский район	town of Shchuchye	23547
Shumikhinsky District	Шумихинский район	town of Shumikha	28499
Tselinny District	Целинный район	selo of Tselinnoye	17187
Vargashinsky District	Варгашинский район	urban-type settlement of Vargashi	19919
Yurgamyshsky District	Юргамышский район	urban-type settlement of Yurgamysh	20886
Zverinogolovsky District	Звериноголовский район	selo of Zverinogolovskoye	9518

=== Kursk Oblast ===
District	Russian name	Administrative center	Population (2010 Census)
Belovsky District	Беловский район	sloboda of Belaya	17933
Bolshesoldatsky District	Большесолдатский район	selo of Bolshoye Soldatskoye	12678
Cheremisinovsky District	Черемисиновский район	work settlement of Cheremisinovo	10347
Dmitriyevsky District	Дмитриевский район	town of Dmitriyev	18088
Fatezhsky District	Фатежский район	town of Fatezh	18885
Glushkovsky District	Глушковский район	work settlement of Glushkovo	22661
Gorshechensky District	Горшеченский район	work settlement of Gorshechnoye	18591
Kastorensky District	Касторенский район	work settlement of Kastornoye	18195
Khomutovsky District	Хомутовский район	work settlement of Khomutovka	11429
Konyshyovsky District	Конышёвский район	work settlement of Konyshyovka	10594
Korenevsky District	Кореневский район	work settlement of Korenevo	18294
Kurchatovsky District	Курчатовский район	town of Kurchatov	18021
Kursky District	Курский район	city of Kursk	54778
Lgovsky District	Льговский район	town of Lgov	14451
Manturovsky District	Мантуровский район	selo of Manturovo	14349
Medvensky District	Медвенский район	work settlement of Medvenka	16558
Oboyansky District	Обоянский район	town of Oboyan	31042
Oktyabrsky District	Октябрьский район	work settlement of Pryamitsyno	22569
Ponyrovsky District	Поныровский район	work settlement of Ponyri	11778
Pristensky District	Пристенский район	work settlement of Pristen	16893
Rylsky District	Рыльский район	town of Rylsk	33158
Shchigrovsky District	Щигровский район	town of Shchigry	11994
Solntsevsky District	Солнцевский район	work settlement of Solntsevo	15382
Sovetsky District	Советский район	work settlement of Kshensky	19080
Sudzhansky District	Суджанский район	town of Sudzha	26964
Timsky District	Тимский район	work settlement of Tim	11759
Zheleznogorsky District	Железногорский район	town of Zheleznogorsk	16289
Zolotukhinsky District	Золотухинский район	work settlement of Zolotukhino	22914

=== Leningrad Oblast ===
District	Russian name	Administrative center	Population (2010 Census)
Boksitogorsky District	Бокситогорский район	town of Boksitogorsk	15695
Gatchinsky District	Гатчинский район	town of Gatchina	140210
Kingiseppsky District	Кингисеппский район	town of Kingisepp	19830
Kirishsky District	Киришский район	town of Kirishi	11455
Kirovsky District	Кировский район	town of Kirovsk	62533
Lodeynopolsky District	Лодейнопольский район	town of Lodeynoye Pole	9795
Luzhsky District	Лужский район	town of Luga	40166
Podporozhsky District	Подпорожский район	town of Podporozhye	13000
Priozersky District	Приозерский район	town of Priozersk	43260
Slantsevsky District	Сланцевский район	town of Slantsy	10038
Tikhvinsky District	Тихвинский район	town of Tikhvin	12529
Tosnensky District	Тосненский район	town of Tosno	83898
Volkhovsky District	Волховский район	town of Volkhov	48000
Volosovsky District	Волосовский район	town of Volosovo	49443
Vsevolozhsky District	Всеволожский район	town of Vsevolozhsk	153045
Vyborgsky District	Выборгский район	town of Vyborg	124446

=== Lipetsk Oblast ===
District	Russian name	Administrative center	Population (2010 Census)
Chaplyginsky District	Чаплыгинский район	town of Chaplygin	32704
Dankovsky District	Данковский район	town of Dankov	35468
Dobrinsky District	Добринский район	settlement of Dobrinka	37567
Dobrovsky District	Добровский район	selo of Dobroye	24228
Dolgorukovsky District	Долгоруковский район	selo of Dolgorukovo	18623
Gryazinsky District	Грязинский район	town of Gryazi	75159
Izmalkovsky District	Измалковский район	selo of Izmalkovo	17281
Khlevensky District	Хлевенский район	selo of Khlevnoye	20208
Krasninsky District	Краснинский район	selo of Krasnoye	13498
Lebedyansky District	Лебедянский район	town of Lebedyan	43178
Lev-Tolstovsky District	Лев-Толстовский район	settlement of Lev Tolstoy	17141
Lipetsky District	Липецкий район	city of Lipetsk	49258
Stanovlyansky District	Становлянский район	selo of Stanovoye	18746
Terbunsky District	Тербунский район	selo of Terbuny	22536
Usmansky District	Усманский район	town of Usman	50906
Volovsky District	Воловский район	selo of Volovo	14632
Yeletsky District	Елецкий район	city of Yelets	30130
Zadonsky District	Задонский район	town of Zadonsk	34959

=== Magadan Oblast ===
District	Russian name	Administrative center	Population (2010 Census)
Khasynsky District	Хасынский район	urban-type settlement of Palatka	8141
Olsky District	Ольский район	urban-type settlement of Ola	10496
Omsukchansky District	Омсукчанский район	urban-type settlement of Omsukchan	5531
Severo-Evensky District	Северо-Эвенский район	urban-type settlement of Evensk	2666
Srednekansky District	Среднеканский район	urban-type settlement of Seymchan	3228
Susumansky District	Сусуманский район	town of Susuman	9015
Tenkinsky District	Тенькинский район	urban-type settlement of Ust-Omchug	5422
Yagodninsky District	Ягоднинский район	urban-type settlement of Yagodnoye	9839

=== Mari El Republic ===
District	Russian name	Administrative center	Population (2010 Census)
Gornomariysky District	Горномарийский район	town of Kozmodemyansk	25869
Kilemarsky District	Килемарский район	urban-type settlement of Kilemary	13604
Kuzhenersky District	Куженерский район	urban-type settlement of Kuzhener	14556
Mari-Tureksky District	Мари-Турекский район	urban-type settlement of Mari-Turek	23155
Medvedevsky District	Медведевский район	urban-type settlement of Medvedevo	67703
Morkinsky District	Моркинский район	urban-type settlement of Morki	32403
Novotoryalsky District	Новоторъяльский район	urban-type settlement of Novy Toryal	17124
Orshansky District	Оршанский район	urban-type settlement of Orshanka	15139
Paranginsky District	Параньгинский район	urban-type settlement of Paranga	16307
Sernursky District	Сернурский район	urban-type settlement of Sernur	25672
Sovetsky District	Советский район	urban-type settlement of Sovetsky	31081
Volzhsky District	Волжский район	town of Volzhsk	23940
Yurinsky District	Юринский район	urban-type settlement of Yurino	8758
Zvenigovsky District	Звениговский район	town of Zvenigovo	44976

=== Republic of Mordovia ===
District	Russian name	Administrative center	Population (2010 Census)
Ardatovsky District	Ардатовский район	town of Ardatov	29446
Atyashevsky District	Атяшевский район	work settlement of Atyashevo	20161
Atyuryevsky District	Атюрьевский район	selo of Atyuryevo	10952
Bolshebereznikovsky District	Большеберезниковский район	selo of Bolshiye Berezniki	14072
Bolsheignatovsky District	Большеигнатовский район	selo of Bolshoye Ignatovo	8313
Chamzinsky District	Чамзинский район	work settlement of Chamzinka	31639
Dubyonsky District	Дубёнский район	selo of Dubyonki	13851
Ichalkovsky District	Ичалковский район	selo of Kemlya	20582
Insarsky District	Инсарский район	town of Insar	14098
Kadoshkinsky District	Кадошкинский район	work settlement of Kadoshkino	7970
Kochkurovsky District	Кочкуровский район	selo of Kochkurovo	10794
Kovylkinsky District	Ковылкинский район	town of Kovylkino	22523
Krasnoslobodsky District	Краснослободский район	town of Krasnoslobodsk	26406
Lyambirsky District	Лямбирский район	selo of Lyambir	34142
Romodanovsky District	Ромодановский район	settlement of Romodanovo	20702
Ruzayevsky District	Рузаевский район	town of Ruzayevka	18859
Staroshaygovsky District	Старошайговский район	selo of Staroye Shaygovo	14071
Temnikovsky District	Темниковский район	town of Temnikov	17261
Tengushevsky District	Теньгушевский район	selo of Tengushevo	12340
Torbeyevsky District	Торбеевский район	work settlement of Torbeyevo	21479
Yelnikovsky District	Ельниковский район	selo of Yelniki	11995
Zubovo-Polyansky District	Зубово-Полянский район	work settlement of Zubova Polyana	59256

=== Federal city of Moscow ===
District	Russian name	Population (2010 Census)
Arbat District	район Арбат	25699
Basmanny District	Басманный район	100899
Zamoskvorechye District	район Замоскворечье	50590
Krasnoselsky District	Красносельский район	45229
Meshchansky District	Мещанский район	56077
Presnensky District	Пресненский район	116979
Tagansky District	Таганский район	109993
Tverskoy District	Тверской район	75955
Khamovniki District	район Хамовники	97110
Yakimanka District	район Якиманка	22822
Aeroport District	район Аэропорт	74775
Begovoy District	Беговой район	44385
Beskudnikovsky District	Бескудниковский район	74790
Voykovsky District	Войковский район	67470
Vostochnoye Degunino District	район Восточное Дегунино	97083
Golovinsky District	Головинский район	102160
Dmitrovsky District	Дмитровский район	88931
Zapadnoye Degunino District	район Западное Дегунино	76756
Koptevo District	район Коптево	97989
Levoberezhny District	Левобережный район	51309
Molzhaninovsky District	Молжаниновский район	2928
Savyolovsky District	Савёловский район	57814
Sokol District	район Сокол	57317
Timiryazevsky District	Тимирязевский район	84098
Khovrino District	район Ховрино	79092
Khoroshyovsky District	Хорошёвский район	55949
Alexeyevsky District	Алексеевский район	73429
Altufyevsky District	Алтуфьевский район	50091
Babushkinsky District	Бабушкинский район	77491
Bibirevo District	район Бибирево	151334
Butyrsky District	район Бутырский	60922
Lianozovo District	район Лианозово	76465
Losinoostrovsky District	Лосиноостровский район	72640
Marfino District	район Марфино	23971
Maryina roshcha District	район Марьина роща	60194
Ostankinsky District	Останкинский район	57707
Otradnoye District	район Отрадное	168972
Rostokino District	район Ростокино	35134
Sviblovo District	район Свиблово	52824
Severny District	Северный район	9629
Severnoye Medvedkovo District	район Северное Медведково	111804
Yuzhnoye Medvedkovo District	район Южное Медведково	72716
Yaroslavsky District	Ярославский район	84739
Bogorodskoye District	район Богородское	98602
Veshnyaki District	район Вешняки	126546
Vostochny District	Восточный район	
Vostochnoye Izmaylovo District	район Восточное Измайлово	75450
Golyanovo District	район Гольяново	159147
Ivanovskoye District	район Ивановское	127905
Izmaylovo District	район Измайлово	110099
Kosino-Ukhtomsky District	Косино-Ухтомский район	16917
Metrogorodok District	район Метрогородок	37283
Novogireyevo District	район Новогиреево	95183
Novokosino District	район Новокосино	97927
Perovo District	район Перово	135095
Preobrazhenskoye District	район Преображенское	80827
Severnoye Izmaylovo District	район Северное Измайлово	80785
Sokolinaya gora District	район Соколиная гора	85056
Sokolniki District	район Сокольники	54975
Vykhino-Zhulebino District	район Выхино-Жулебино	184749
Kapotnya District	район Капотня	27828
Kuzminki District	район Кузьминки	122951
Lefortovo District	район Лефортово	87560
Lyublino District	район Люблино	132331
Maryino District	район Марьино	206388
Nekrasovka District	район Некрасовка	
Nizhegorodsky District	Нижегородский район	38756
Pechatniki District	район Печатники	71383
Ryazansky District	Рязанский район	89270
Tekstilshchiki District	район Текстильщики	87849
Yuzhnoportovy District	Южнопортовый район	60056
Biryulyovo Vostochnoye District	район Бирюлёво Восточное	129700
Biryulyovo Zapadnoye District	район Бирюлёво Западное	83303
Brateyevo District	район Братеево	94644
Danilovsky District	Даниловский район	90265
Donskoy District	Донской район	45447
Zyablikovo District	район Зябликово	121197
Moskvorechye-Saburovo District	район Москворечье-Сабурово	67257
Nagatino-Sadovniki District	район Нагатино-Садовники	69031
Nagatinsky zaton District	район Нагатинский затон	105948
Nagorny District	Нагорный район	69535
Orekhovo-Borisovo Severnoye District	район Орехово-Борисово Северное	121402
Orekhovo-Borisovo Yuzhnoye District	район Орехово-Борисово Южное	137965
Tsaritsyno District	район Царицыно	115708
Chertanovo Severnoye District	район Чертаново Северное	104613
Chertanovo Tsentralnoye District	район Чертаново Центральное	104042
Chertanovo Yuzhnoye District	район Чертаново Южное	133008
Akademichesky District	Академический район	96172
Gagarinsky District	Гагаринский район	72072
Zyuzino District	район Зюзино	111719
Konkovo District	район Коньково	138757
Kotlovka District	район Котловка	58666
Lomonosovsky District	Ломоносовский район	81851
Obruchevsky District	Обручевский район	63484
Severnoye Butovo District	район Северное Бутово	75045
Tyoply Stan District	район Тёплый Стан	112733
Cheryomushki District	район Черёмушки	89264
Yuzhnoye Butovo District	район Южное Бутово	105212
Yasenevo District	район Ясенево	174236
Dorogomilovo District	район Дорогомилово	59732
Vnukovo District	район Внуково	
Krylatskoye District	район Крылатское	76261
Kuntsevo District	район Кунцево	125100
Mozhaysky District	Можайский район	109248
Novo-Peredelkino District	район Ново-Переделкино	86755
Ochakovo-Matveyevskoye District	район Очаково-Матвеевское	90576
Prospekt Vernadskogo District	район Проспект Вернадского	56564
Ramenki District	район Раменки	101485
Solntsevo District	район Солнцево	85642
Troparyovo-Nikulino District	район Тропарёво-Никулино	77901
Filyovsky park District	район Филёвский парк	66775
Fili-Davydkovo District	район Фили-Давыдково	92965
Kurkino District	район Куркино	2339
Mitino District	район Митино	138371
Pokrovskoye-Streshnevo District	район Покровское-Стрешнево	46707
Severnoye Tushino District	район Северное Тушино	138533
Strogino District	район Строгино	124149
Khoroshyovo-Mnyovniki District	район Хорошёво-Мнёвники	146968
Shchukino District	район Щукино	89454
Yuzhnoye Tushino District	район Южное Тушино	93444
Matushkino District	район Матушкино	38430
Savyolki District	район Савёлки	33429
Silino District	район Силино	38168
Staroye Kryukovo District	район Старое Крюково	32219

=== Murmansk Oblast ===
District	Russian name	Administrative center	Population (2010 Census)	Notes on municipal incorporation
Kandalakshsky District	Кандалакшский район	town of Kandalaksha	N/A	
Kolsky District	Кольский район	town of Kola	44670	
Kovdorsky District	Ковдорский район	town of Kovdor	21297	Incorporated as Kovdorsky Urban Okrug
Lovozersky District	Ловозерский район	selo of Lovozero	11820	
Pechengsky District	Печенгский район	urban-type settlement of Nikel	38920	
Tersky District	Терский район	urban-type settlement of Umba	6288	

=== Nenets Autonomous Okrug ===
District	Russian name	Administrative center	Population (2010 Census)
Zapolyarny District	Заполярный район	work settlement of Iskateley	20432

=== Nizhny Novgorod Oblast ===
District	Russian name	Administrative center	Population (2010 Census)	Notes on municipal incorporation
Ardatovsky District	Ардатовский район	work settlement of Ardatov	26428	
Arzamassky District	Арзамасский район	city of Arzamas	43723	
Balakhninsky District	Балахнинский район	town of Balakhna	77598	
Bogorodsky District	Богородский район	town of Bogorodsk	65677	
Bolsheboldinsky District	Большеболдинский район	selo of Bolshoye Boldino	12035	
Bolshemurashkinsky District	Большемурашкинский район	work settlement of Bolshoye Murashkino	10508	
Buturlinsky District	Бутурлинский район	work settlement of Buturlino	14471	
Dalnekonstantinovsky District	Дальнеконстантиновский район	work settlement of Dalneye Konstantinovo	22474	
Diveyevsky District	Дивеевский район	selo of Diveyevo	16618	
Gaginsky District	Гагинский район	selo of Gagino	12444	
Gorodetsky District	Городецкий район	town of Gorodets	91577	
Knyagininsky District	Княгининский район	town of Knyaginino	11922	
Koverninsky District	Ковернинский район	work settlement of Kovernino	19951	
Krasnobakovsky District	Краснобаковский район	work settlement of Krasnye Baki	22524	
Krasnooktyabrsky District	Краснооктябрьский район	selo of Urazovka	11729	
Kstovsky District	Кстовский район	town of Kstovo	112823	
Lukoyanovsky District	Лукояновский район	town of Lukoyanov	32384	
Lyskovsky District	Лысковский район	town of Lyskovo	39964	
Pavlovsky District	Павловский район	town of Pavlovo	100960	
Perevozsky District	Перевозский район	town of Perevoz	16519	
Pilninsky District	Пильнинский район	work settlement of Pilna	21960	
Pochinkovsky District	Починковский район	selo of Pochinki	30668	
Sechenovsky District	Сеченовский район	selo of Sechenovo	15446	
Sergachsky District	Сергачский район	town of Sergach	31296	
Sharangsky District	Шарангский район	work settlement of Sharanga	12450	
Shatkovsky District	Шатковский район	work settlement of Shatki	27018	
Sokolsky District	Сокольский район	work settlement of Sokolskoye	14139	Incorporated as Sokolsky Urban Okrug
Sosnovsky District	Сосновский район	work settlement of Sosnovskoye	19546	
Spassky District	Спасский район	selo of Spasskoye	10998	
Tonkinsky District	Тонкинский район	work settlement of Tonkino	9007	
Tonshayevsky District	Тоншаевский район	work settlement of Tonshayevo	20219	
Urensky District	Уренский район	town of Uren	30106	
Vachsky District	Вачский район	work settlement of Vacha	19979	
Vadsky District	Вадский район	selo of Vad	15626	
Varnavinsky District	Варнавинский район	work settlement of Varnavino	13366	
Vetluzhsky District	Ветлужский район	town of Vetluga	16330	
Volodarsky District	Володарский район	town of Volodarsk	58807	
Vorotynsky District	Воротынский район	work settlement of Vorotynets	19411	
Voskresensky District	Воскресенский район	work settlement of Voskresenskoye	21645	
Voznesensky District	Вознесенский район	work settlement of Voznesenskoye	17352	

=== Republic of North Ossetia–Alania ===
District	Russian name	Administrative center	Population (2010 Census)
Alagirsky District	Алагирский район	town of Alagir	38830
Ardonsky District	Ардонский район	town of Ardon	30685
Digorsky District	Дигорский район	town of Digora	19334
Irafsky District	Ирафский район	selo of Chikola	15766
Kirovsky District	Кировский район	selo of Elkhotovo	27807
Mozdoksky District	Моздокский район	town of Mozdok	84682
Pravoberezhny District	Правобережный район	town of Beslan	57063
Prigorodny District	Пригородный район	selo of Oktyabrskoye	108665

=== Novgorod Oblast ===
District	Russian name	Administrative center	Population (2010 Census)
Batetsky District	Батецкий район	settlement of Batetsky	6335
Borovichsky District	Боровичский район	town of Borovichi	15675
Chudovsky District	Чудовский район	town of Chudovo	22011
Demyansky District	Демянский район	work settlement of Demyansk	13001
Kholmsky District	Холмский район	town of Kholm	6177
Khvoyninsky District	Хвойнинский район	work settlement of Khvoynaya	15552
Krestetsky District	Крестецкий район	work settlement of Kresttsy	12940
Lyubytinsky District	Любытинский район	work settlement of Lyubytino	9744
Malovishersky District	Маловишерский район	town of Malaya Vishera	17785
Maryovsky District	Марёвский район	selo of Maryovo	4673
Moshenskoy District	Мошенской район	selo of Moshenskoye	7309
Novgorodsky District	Новгородский район	city of Veliky Novgorod	57673
Okulovsky District	Окуловский район	town of Okulovka	25808
Parfinsky District	Парфинский район	work settlement of Parfino	14395
Pestovsky District	Пестовский район	town of Pestovo	21676
Poddorsky District	Поддорский район	selo of Poddorye	4645
Shimsky District	Шимский район	work settlement of Shimsk	11750
Soletsky District	Солецкий район	town of Soltsy	15714
Starorussky District	Старорусский район	town of Staraya Russa	15063
Valdaysky District	Валдайский район	town of Valday	26476
Volotovsky District	Волотовский район	settlement of Volot	5493

=== Novosibirsk Oblast ===
District	Russian name	Administrative center	Population (2010 Census)
Bagansky District	Баганский район	selo of Bagan	16627
Barabinsky District	Барабинский район	town of Barabinsk	14169
Bolotninsky District	Болотнинский район	town of Bolotnoye	29365
Chanovsky District	Чановский район	work settlement of Chany	25523
Cherepanovsky District	Черепановский район	town of Cherepanovo	47842
Chistoozyorny District	Чистоозёрный район	work settlement of Chistoozyornoye	19603
Chulymsky District	Чулымский район	town of Chulym	23909
Dovolensky District	Доволенский район	selo of Dovolnoye	17405
Iskitimsky District	Искитимский район	town of Iskitim	62816
Karasuksky District	Карасукский район	town of Karasuk	46262
Kargatsky District	Каргатский район	town of Kargat	18207
Kochenyovsky District	Коченёвский район	work settlement of Kochenyovo	43850
Kochkovsky District	Кочковский район	selo of Kochki	14863
Kolyvansky District	Колыванский район	work settlement of Kolyvan	24049
Krasnozyorsky District	Краснозёрский район	work settlement of Krasnozyorskoye	32491
Kupinsky District	Купинский район	town of Kupino	31199
Kuybyshevsky District	Куйбышевский район	town of Kuybyshev	15466
Kyshtovsky District	Кыштовский район	selo of Kyshtovka	12399
Maslyaninsky District	Маслянинский район	work settlement of Maslyanino	24438
Moshkovsky District	Мошковский район	work settlement of Moshkovo	39192
Novosibirsky District	Новосибирский район	city of Novosibirsk	127891
Ordynsky District	Ордынский район	work settlement of Ordynskoye	36708
Severny District	Северный район	selo of Severnoye	10687
Suzunsky District	Сузунский район	work settlement of Suzun	32592
Tatarsky District	Татарский район	town of Tatarsk	15875
Toguchinsky District	Тогучинский район	town of Toguchin	60303
Ubinsky District	Убинский район	selo of Ubinskoye	16297
Ust-Tarksky District	Усть-Таркский район	selo of Ust-Tarka	12307
Vengerovsky District	Венгеровский район	selo of Vengerovo	20446
Zdvinsky District	Здвинский район	selo of Zdvinsk	16636

=== Omsk Oblast ===
District	Russian name	Administrative center	Population (2010 Census)
Azovsky Nemetsky National District	Азовский Немецкий национальный район	selo of Azovo	22925
Bolsherechensky District	Большереченский район	work settlement of Bolsherechye	28486
Bolsheukovsky District	Большеуковский район	selo of Bolshiye Uki	8174
Cherlaksky District	Черлакский район	work settlement of Cherlak	30344
Gorkovsky District	Горьковский район	work settlement of Gorkovskoye	20807
Isilkulsky District	Исилькульский район	town of Isilkul	18942
Kalachinsky District	Калачинский район	town of Kalachinsk	18197
Kolosovsky District	Колосовский район	selo of Kolosovka	12803
Kormilovsky District	Кормиловский район	work settlement of Kormilovka	24726
Krutinsky District	Крутинский район	work settlement of Krutinka	17408
Lyubinsky District	Любинский район	work settlement of Lyubinsky	37735
Maryanovsky District	Марьяновский район	work settlement of Maryanovka	27595
Moskalensky District	Москаленский район	work settlement of Moskalenki	28968
Muromtsevsky District	Муромцевский район	work settlement of Muromtsevo	23795
Nazyvayevsky District	Называевский район	town of Nazyvayevsk	12372
Nizhneomsky District	Нижнеомский район	selo of Nizhnyaya Omka	15826
Novovarshavsky District	Нововаршавский район	work settlement of Novovarshavka	24450
Odessky District	Одесский район	selo of Odesskoye	17422
Okoneshnikovsky District	Оконешниковский район	work settlement of Okoneshnikovo	14791
Omsky District	Омский район	settlement of Rostovka	94086
Pavlogradsky District	Павлоградский район	work settlement of Pavlogradka	20034
Poltavsky District	Полтавский район	work settlement of Poltavka	21772
Russko-Polyansky District	Русско-Полянский район	work settlement of Russkaya Polyana	19333
Sargatsky District	Саргатский район	work settlement of Sargatskoye	20014
Sedelnikovsky District	Седельниковский район	selo of Sedelnikovo	10943
Sherbakulsky District	Шербакульский район	work settlement of Sherbakul	21342
Tarsky District	Тарский район	town of Tara	19242
Tavrichesky District	Таврический район	work settlement of Tavricheskoye	36458
Tevrizsky District	Тевризский район	work settlement of Tevriz	15485
Tyukalinsky District	Тюкалинский район	town of Tyukalinsk	14831
Ust-Ishimsky District	Усть-Ишимский район	selo of Ust-Ishim	13480
Znamensky District	Знаменский район	selo of Znamenskoye	12427

=== Orenburg Oblast ===
District	Russian name	Administrative center	Population (2010 Census)
Abdulinsky District	Абдулинский район	town of Abdulino	10373
Adamovsky District	Адамовский район	settlement of Adamovka	26079
Akbulaksky District	Акбулакский район	settlement of Akbulak	25606
Alexandrovsky District	Александровский район	selo of Alexandrovka	15702
Asekeyevsky District	Асекеевский район	selo of Asekeyevo	21050
Belyayevsky District	Беляевский район	selo of Belyayevka	17074
Buguruslansky District	Бугурусланский район	town of Buguruslan	19680
Buzuluksky District	Бузулукский район	town of Buzuluk	31071
Dombarovsky District	Домбаровский район	settlement of Dombarovsky	15994
Gaysky District	Гайский район	town of Gay	10331
Grachyovsky District	Грачёвский район	selo of Grachyovka	13495
Ileksky District	Илекский район	selo of Ilek	25150
Krasnogvardeysky District	Красногвардейский район	selo of Pleshanovo	21097
Kurmanayevsky District	Курманаевский район	selo of Kurmanayevka	17705
Kuvandyksky District	Кувандыкский район	town of Kuvandyk	19545
Kvarkensky District	Кваркенский район	selo of Kvarkeno	18655
Matveyevsky District	Матвеевский район	selo of Matveyevka	12267
Novoorsky District	Новоорский район	settlement of Novoorsk	29428
Novosergiyevsky District	Новосергиевский район	settlement of Novosergiyevka	36322
Oktyabrsky District	Октябрьский район	selo of Oktyabrskoye	20018
Orenburgsky District	Оренбургский район	city of Orenburg	74404
Perevolotsky District	Переволоцкий район	settlement of Perevolotsky	28345
Pervomaysky District	Первомайский район	settlement of Pervomaysky	25626
Ponomaryovsky District	Пономарёвский район	selo of Ponomaryovka	15463
Sakmarsky District	Сакмарский район	selo of Sakmara	29179
Saraktashsky District	Саракташский район	settlement of Saraktash	40145
Severny District	Северный район	selo of Severnoye	15012
Sharlyksky District	Шарлыкский район	selo of Sharlyk	18032
Sol-Iletsky District	Соль-Илецкий район	town of Sol-Iletsk	25424
Sorochinsky District	Сорочинский район	town of Sorochinsk	14192
Svetlinsky District	Светлинский район	settlement of Svetly	13876
Tashlinsky District	Ташлинский район	selo of Tashla	25281
Totsky District	Тоцкий район	selo of Totskoye	32866
Tyulgansky District	Тюльганский район	settlement of Tyulgan	19725
Yasnensky District	Ясненский район	town of Yasny	5043

=== Oryol Oblast ===
District	Russian name	Administrative center	Population (2010 Census)
Bolkhovsky District	Болховский район	town of Bolkhov	18041
Dmitrovsky District	Дмитровский район	town of Dmitrovsk	12196
Dolzhansky District	Должанский район	urban-type settlement of Dolgoye	11984
Glazunovsky District	Глазуновский район	urban-type settlement of Glazunovka	13162
Khotynetsky District	Хотынецкий район	urban-type settlement of Khotynets	10183
Kolpnyansky District	Колпнянский район	urban-type settlement of Kolpna	15453
Korsakovsky District	Корсаковский район	selo of Korsakovo	4798
Krasnozorensky District	Краснозоренский район	settlement of Krasnaya Zarya	6504
Kromskoy District	Кромской район	urban-type settlement of Kromy	21346
Livensky District	Ливенский район	town of Livny	32791
Maloarkhangelsky District	Малоархангельский район	town of Maloarkhangelsk	11520
Mtsensky District	Мценский район	town of Mtsensk	19233
Novoderevenkovsky District	Новодеревеньковский район	urban-type settlement of Khomutovo	10704
Novosilsky District	Новосильский район	town of Novosil	8561
Orlovsky District	Орловский район	city of Oryol	67384
Pokrovsky District	Покровский район	urban-type settlement of Pokrovskoye	14782
Shablykinsky District	Шаблыкинский район	urban-type settlement of Shablykino	8045
Soskovsky District	Сосковский район	selo of Soskovo	5982
Sverdlovsky District	Свердловский район	urban-type settlement of Zmiyevka	16311
Trosnyansky District	Троснянский район	selo of Trosna	10302
Uritsky District	Урицкий район	urban-type settlement of Naryshkino	18666
Verkhovsky District	Верховский район	urban-type settlement of Verkhovye	17283
Zalegoshchensky District	Залегощенский район	urban-type settlement of Zalegoshch	15376
Znamensky District	Знаменский район	selo of Znamenskoye	5016

=== Penza Oblast ===
District	Russian name	Administrative center	Population (2010 Census)
Bashmakovsky District	Башмаковский район	work settlement of Bashmakovo	23304
Bekovsky District	Бековский район	work settlement of Bekovo	17531
Belinsky District	Белинский район	town of Belinsky	28881
Bessonovsky District	Бессоновский район	selo of Bessonovka	45296
Gorodishchensky District	Городищенский район	town of Gorodishche	52480
Issinsky District	Иссинский район	work settlement of Issa	11157
Kamensky District	Каменский район	town of Kamenka	62322
Kameshkirsky District	Камешкирский район	selo of Russky Kameshkir	12802
Kolyshleysky District	Колышлейский район	work settlement of Kolyshley	26187
Kuznetsky District	Кузнецкий район	town of Kuznetsk	38056
Lopatinsky District	Лопатинский район	selo of Lopatino	14942
Luninsky District	Лунинский район	work settlement of Lunino	19944
Maloserdobinsky District	Малосердобинский район	selo of Malaya Serdoba	9824
Mokshansky District	Мокшанский район	work settlement of Mokshan	28033
Narovchatsky District	Наровчатский район	selo of Narovchat	12069
Neverkinsky District	Неверкинский район	selo of Neverkino	16329
Nikolsky District	Никольский район	town of Nikolsk	34271
Nizhnelomovsky District	Нижнеломовский район	town of Nizhny Lomov	41974
Pachelmsky District	Пачелмский район	work settlement of Pachelma	16310
Penzensky District	Пензенский район	selo of Kondol	51308
Serdobsky District	Сердобский район	town of Serdobsk	54520
Shemysheysky District	Шемышейский район	work settlement of Shemysheyka	17661
Sosnovoborsky District	Сосновоборский район	work settlement of Sosnovoborsk	17242
Spassky District	Спасский район	town of Spassk	13008
Tamalinsky District	Тамалинский район	work settlement of Tamala	16503
Vadinsky District	Вадинский район	selo of Vadinsk	9807
Zemetchinsky District	Земетчинский район	work settlement of Zemetchino	24674

=== Perm Krai ===
District	Russian name	Administrative center	Population (2010 Census)
Bardymsky District	Бардымский район	selo of Barda	25538
Beryozovsky District	Берёзовский район	selo of Beryozovka	17042
Bolshesosnovsky District	Большесосновский район	selo of Bolshaya Sosnova	13215
Chastinsky District	Частинский район	selo of Chastye	12817
Cherdynsky District	Чердынский район	town of Cherdyn	24568
Chernushinsky District	Чернушинский район	town of Chernushka	50593
Gaynsky District	Гайнский район	settlement of Gayny	13802
Gornozavodsky District	Горнозаводский район	town of Gornozavodsk	26044
Ilyinsky District	Ильинский район	settlement of Ilyinsky	19634
Karagaysky District	Карагайский район	selo of Karagay	22875
Kishertsky District	Кишертский район	selo of Ust-Kishert	12777
Kochyovsky District	Кочёвский район	selo of Kochyovo	11167
Kosinsky District	Косинский район	selo of Kosa	7246
Krasnovishersky District	Красновишерский район	town of Krasnovishersk	22554
Kudymkarsky District	Кудымкарский район	town of Kudymkar	25808
Kungursky District	Кунгурский район	town of Kungur	42450
Kuyedinsky District	Куединский район	settlement of Kuyeda	26952
Nytvensky District	Нытвенский район	town of Nytva	43812
Ochyorsky District	Очёрский район	town of Ochyor	22828
Okhansky District	Оханский район	town of Okhansk	16272
Oktyabrsky District	Октябрьский район	work settlement of Oktyabrsky	30441
Ordinsky District	Ординский район	selo of Orda	15605
Osinsky District	Осинский район	town of Osa	29513
Permsky District	Пермский район	city of Perm	103444
Sivinsky District	Сивинский район	selo of Siva	14843
Solikamsky District	Соликамский район	town of Solikamsk	17165
Suksunsky District	Суксунский район	work settlement of Suksun	20099
Uinsky District	Уинский район	selo of Uinskoye	11440
Usolsky District	Усольский район	town of Usolye	14232
Vereshchaginsky District	Верещагинский район	town of Vereshchagino	41379
Yelovsky District	Еловский район	selo of Yelovo	10743
Yurlinsky District	Юрлинский район	selo of Yurla	9609
Yusvinsky District	Юсьвинский район	selo of Yusva	19558

- Note: the territories of the cities and towns of krai significance of Alexandrovsk, Chusovoy, Dobryanka, Gremyachinsk, Kizel, and Krasnokamsk are incorporated, correspondingly, as Alexandrovsky, Chusovskoy, Dobryansky, Gremyachinsky, Kizelovsky, and Krasnokamsky Municipal Districts.

=== Primorsky Krai ===
District	Russian name	Administrative center	Population (2010 Census)
Anuchinsky District	Анучинский район	selo of Anuchino	14613
Chernigovsky District	Черниговский район	selo of Chernigovka	36230
Chuguyevsky District	Чугуевский район	selo of Chuguyevka	24937
Dalnerechensky District	Дальнереченский район	town of Dalnerechensk	11344
Kavalerovsky District	Кавалеровский район	urban-type settlement of Kavalerovo	25833
Khankaysky District	Ханкайский район	selo of Kamen-Rybolov	24666
Khasansky District	Хасанский район	urban-type settlement of Slavyanka	35541
Khorolsky District	Хорольский район	selo of Khorol	30281
Kirovsky District	Кировский район	urban-type settlement of Kirovsky	21249
Krasnoarmeysky District	Красноармейский район	selo of Novopokrovka	18537
Lazovsky District	Лазовский район	selo of Lazo	14235
Mikhaylovsky District	Михайловский район	selo of Mikhaylovka	34437
Nadezhdinsky District	Надеждинский район	selo of Volno-Nadezhdinskoye	39161
Oktyabrsky District	Октябрьский район	selo of Pokrovka	30060
Olginsky District	Ольгинский район	urban-type settlement of Olga	10701
Partizansky District	Партизанский район	selo of Vladimiro-Alexandrovskoye	30238
Pogranichny District	Пограничный район	urban-type settlement of Pogranichny	23492
Pozharsky District	Пожарский район	urban-type settlement of Luchegorsk	31086
Shkotovsky District	Шкотовский район	urban-type settlement of Smolyaninovo	24511
Spassky District	Спасский район	town of Spassk-Dalny	30475
Terneysky District	Тернейский район	urban-type settlement of Terney	12468
Yakovlevsky District	Яковлевский район	selo of Yakovlevka	16042

=== Pskov Oblast ===
District	Russian name	Administrative center	Population (2010 Census)
Bezhanitsky District	Бежаницкий район	work settlement of Bezhanitsy	13264
Dedovichsky District	Дедовичский район	work settlement of Dedovichi	14692
Dnovsky District	Дновский район	town of Dno	13341
Gdovsky District	Гдовский район	town of Gdov	12792
Krasnogorodsky District	Красногородский район	work settlement of Krasnogorodsk	7328
Kunyinsky District	Куньинский район	work settlement of Kunya	10277
Loknyansky District	Локнянский район	work settlement of Loknya	9535
Nevelsky District	Невельский район	town of Nevel	26657
Novorzhevsky District	Новоржевский район	town of Novorzhev	9334
Novosokolnichesky District	Новосокольнический район	town of Novosokolniki	14776
Opochetsky District	Опочецкий район	town of Opochka	18673
Ostrovsky District	Островский район	town of Ostrov	31096
Palkinsky District	Палкинский район	work settlement of Palkino	8826
Pechorsky District	Печорский район	town of Pechory	22123
Plyussky District	Плюсский район	work settlement of Plyussa	9187
Porkhovsky District	Порховский район	town of Porkhov	21568
Pskovsky District	Псковский район	city of Pskov	34323
Pushkinogorsky District	Пушкиногорский район	work settlement of Pushkinskiye Gory	9253
Pustoshkinsky District	Пустошкинский район	town of Pustoshka	9379
Pytalovsky District	Пыталовский район	town of Pytalovo	12083
Sebezhsky District	Себежский район	town of Sebezh	21674
Strugo-Krasnensky District	Струго-Красненский район	work settlement of Strugi Krasnye	13466
Usvyatsky District	Усвятский район	work settlement of Usvyaty	5598
Velikoluksky District	Великолукский район	town of Velikiye Luki	22121

=== Rostov Oblast ===
District	Russian name	Administrative center	Population (2010 Census)
Aksaysky District	Аксайский район	town of Aksay	102369
Azovsky District	Азовский район	town of Azov	93579
Bagayevsky District	Багаевский район	stanitsa of Bagayevskaya	34813
Belokalitvinsky District	Белокалитвинский район	town of Belaya Kalitva	102039
Bokovsky District	Боковский район	stanitsa of Bokovskaya	15085
Chertkovsky District	Чертковский район	settlement of Chertkovo	36680
Dubovsky District	Дубовский район	selo of Dubovskoye	22983
Kagalnitsky District	Кагальницкий район	stanitsa of Kagalnitskaya	30489
Kamensky District	Каменский район	work settlement of Gluboky	47696
Kasharsky District	Кашарский район	sloboda of Kashary	25355
Konstantinovsky District	Константиновский район	town of Konstantinovsk	33159
Krasnosulinsky District	Красносулинский район	town of Krasny Sulin	81825
Kuybyshevsky District	Куйбышевский район	selo of Kuybyshevo	14800
Martynovsky District	Мартыновский район	sloboda of Bolshaya Martynovka	36545
Matveyevo-Kurgansky District	Матвеево-Курганский район	settlement of Matveyev Kurgan	43446
Millerovsky District	Миллеровский район	town of Millerovo	68360
Milyutinsky District	Милютинский район	stanitsa of Milyutinskaya	15082
Morozovsky District	Морозовский район	town of Morozovsk	42404
Myasnikovsky District	Мясниковский район	selo of Chaltyr	39631
Neklinovsky District	Неклиновский район	selo of Pokrovskoye	84915
Oblivsky District	Обливский район	stanitsa of Oblivskaya	18872
Oktyabrsky District	Октябрьский район	work settlement of Kamenolomni	73224
Orlovsky District	Орловский район	settlement of Orlovsky	40894
Peschanokopsky District	Песчанокопский район	selo of Peschanokopskoye	31619
Proletarsky District	Пролетарский район	town of Proletarsk	36510
Remontnensky District	Ремонтненский район	selo of Remontnoye	19152
Rodionovo-Nesvetaysky District	Родионово-Несветайский район	sloboda of Rodionovo-Nesvetayskaya	23632
Salsky District	Сальский район	town of Salsk	107795
Semikarakorsky District	Семикаракорский район	town of Semikarakorsk	52833
Sholokhovsky District	Шолоховский район	stanitsa of Vyoshenskaya	27294
Sovetsky District	Советский район	stanitsa of Sovetskaya	6692
Tarasovsky District	Тарасовский район	settlement of Tarasovsky	29802
Tatsinsky District	Тацинский район	stanitsa of Tatsinskaya	38464
Tselinsky District	Целинский район	settlement of Tselina	33690
Tsimlyansky District	Цимлянский район	town of Tsimlyansk	34222
Ust-Donetsky District	Усть-Донецкий район	work settlement of Ust-Donetsky	33647
Verkhnedonskoy District	Верхнедонской район	stanitsa of Kazanskaya	20441
Vesyolovsky District	Весёловский район	settlement of Vesyoly	26165
Volgodonskoy District	Волгодонской район	stanitsa of Romanovskaya	33779
Yegorlyksky District	Егорлыкский район	stanitsa of Yegorlykskaya	35733
Zavetinsky District	Заветинский район	selo of Zavetnoye	17250
Zernogradsky District	Зерноградский район	town of Zernograd	58757
Zimovnikovsky District	Зимовниковский район	settlement of Zimovniki	37092

=== Ryazan Oblast ===
District	Russian name	Administrative center	Population (2010 Census)
Alexandro-Nevsky District	Александро-Невский район	work settlement of Alexandro-Nevsky	11818
Chuchkovsky District	Чучковский район	work settlement of Chuchkovo	8700
Kadomsky District	Кадомский район	work settlement of Kadom	8494
Kasimovsky District	Касимовский район	town of Kasimov	29602
Klepikovsky District	Клепиковский район	town of Spas-Klepiki	25476
Korablinsky District	Кораблинский район	town of Korablino	22941
Mikhaylovsky District	Михайловский район	town of Mikhaylov	35223
Miloslavsky District	Милославский район	work settlement of Miloslavskoye	13455
Pitelinsky District	Пителинский район	work settlement of Pitelino	5893
Pronsky District	Пронский район	work settlement of Pronsk	31393
Putyatinsky District	Путятинский район	selo of Putyatino	7511
Ryazansky District	Рязанский район	city of Ryazan	56869
Ryazhsky District	Ряжский район	town of Ryazhsk	29026
Rybnovsky District	Рыбновский район	town of Rybnoye	35585
Sapozhkovsky District	Сапожковский район	work settlement of Sapozhok	10901
Sarayevsky District	Сараевский район	work settlement of Sarai	17810
Sasovsky District	Сасовский район	town of Sasovo	18504
Shatsky District	Шацкий район	town of Shatsk	24414
Shilovsky District	Шиловский район	work settlement of Shilovo	40334
Skopinsky District	Скопинский район	town of Skopin	27080
Spassky District	Спасский район	town of Spassk-Ryazansky	30388
Starozhilovsky District	Старожиловский район	work settlement of Starozhilovo	17136
Ukholovsky District	Ухоловский район	work settlement of Ukholovo	9532
Yermishinsky District	Ермишинский район	work settlement of Yermish	8879
Zakharovsky District	Захаровский район	selo of Zakharovo	9136

=== Federal city of Saint Petersburg ===
District	Russian name	Population (2010 Census)
Admiralteysky District	Адмиралтейский район	187837
Frunzensky District	Фрунзенский район	405274
Kalininsky District	Калининский район	469409
Kirovsky District	Кировский район	338820
Kolpinsky District	Колпинский район	175396
Krasnogvardeysky District	Красногвардейский район	336342
Krasnoselsky District	Красносельский район	305129
Kronshtadtsky District	Кронштадтский район	43385
Kurortny District	Курортный район	67511
Moskovsky District	Московский район	275884
Nevsky District	Невский район	438061
Petrodvortsovy District	Петродворцовый район	77542
Petrogradsky District	Петроградский район	134607
Primorsky District	Приморский район	393960
Pushkinsky District	Пушкинский район	101655
Tsentralny District	Центральный район	236856
Vasileostrovsky District	Василеостровский район	199692
Vyborgsky District	Выборгский район	419567

=== Sakha Republic ===
District	Russian name	Administrative center	Population (2010 Census)
Abyysky District	Абыйский район	settlement of Belaya Gora	4425
Aldansky District	Алданский район	town of Aldan	42632
Allaikhovsky District	Аллаиховский район	settlement of Chokurdakh	3050
Amginsky District	Амгинский район	selo of Amga	17183
Anabarsky District	Анабарский район	selo of Saskylakh	3501
Bulunsky District	Булунский район	settlement of Tiksi	9054
Churapchinsky District	Чурапчинский район	selo of Churapcha	20387
Eveno-Bytantaysky National District	Эвено-Бытантайский район	selo of Batagay-Alyta	2867
Gorny District	Горный район	selo of Berdigestyakh	11706
Khangalassky District	Хангаласский район	town of Pokrovsk	24557
Kobyaysky District	Кобяйский район	settlement of Sangar	13680
Lensky District	Ленский район	town of Lensk	39765
Megino-Kangalassky District	Мегино-Кангаласский район	settlement of Nizhny Bestyakh	31278
Mirninsky District	Мирнинский район	town of Mirny	38802
Momsky District	Момский район	selo of Khonuu	4452
Namsky District	Намский район	selo of Namtsy	23198
Nizhnekolymsky District	Нижнеколымский район	urban-type settlement of Chersky	4664
Nyurbinsky District	Нюрбинский район	town of Nyurba	15101
Olenyoksky District	Оленёкский район	selo of Olenyok	4127
Olyokminsky District	Олёкминский район	town of Olyokminsk	26785
Oymyakonsky District	Оймяконский район	urban-type settlement of Ust-Nera	10109
Srednekolymsky District	Среднеколымский район	town of Srednekolymsk	7897
Suntarsky District	Сунтарский район	selo of Suntar	25140
Tattinsky District	Таттинский район	selo of Ytyk-Kyuyol	17242
Tomponsky District	Томпонский район	urban-type settlement of Khandyga	14099
Ust-Aldansky District	Усть-Алданский район	selo of Borogontsy	22155
Ust-Maysky District	Усть-Майский район	urban-type settlement of Ust-Maya	8629
Ust-Yansky District	Усть-Янский район	urban-type settlement of Deputatsky	8056
Verkhnekolymsky District	Верхнеколымский район	urban-type settlement of Zyryanka	4723
Verkhnevilyuysky District	Верхневилюйский район	selo of Verkhnevilyuysk	21661
Verkhoyansky District	Верхоянский район	urban-type settlement of Batagay	12815
Vilyuysky District	Вилюйский район	town of Vilyuysk	25222
Zhigansky District	Жиганский район	selo of Zhigansk	4296

=== Sakhalin Oblast ===
District	Russian name	Administrative center	Population (2010 Census)	Notes on municipal incorporation
Alexandrovsk-Sakhalinsky District	Александровск-Сахалинский район	town of Alexandrovsk-Sakhalinsky	2791	Incorporated as Alexandrovsk-Sakhalinsky Urban Okrug
Anivsky District	Анивский район	town of Aniva	17533	Incorporated as Anivsky Urban Okrug
Dolinsky District	Долинский район	town of Dolinsk	13699	Incorporated as Dolinsky Urban Okrug
Kholmsky District	Холмский район	town of Kholmsk	10988	Incorporated as Kholmsky Urban Okrug
Korsakovsky District	Корсаковский район	town of Korsakov	7885	Incorporated as Korsakovsky Urban Okrug
Kurilsky District	Курильский район	town of Kurilsk	7359	Incorporated as Kurilsky Urban Okrug
Makarovsky District	Макаровский район	town of Makarov	8579	Incorporated as Makarovsky Urban Okrug
Nevelsky District	Невельский район	town of Nevelsk	5876	Incorporated as Nevelsky Urban Okrug
Nogliksky District	Ногликский район	urban-type settlement of Nogliki	12124	Incorporated as Nogliksky Urban Okrug
Okhinsky District	Охинский район	town of Okha	2847	Incorporated as Okhinsky Urban Okrug
Poronaysky District	Поронайский район	town of Poronaysk	7811	Incorporated as Poronaysky Urban Okrug
Severo-Kurilsky District	Северо-Курильский район	town of Severo-Kurilsk	2536	Incorporated as Severo-Kurilsky Urban Okrug
Smirnykhovsky District	Смирныховский район	urban-type settlement of Smirnykh	13142	Incorporated as Smirnykhovsky Urban Okrug
Tomarinsky District	Томаринский район	town of Tomari	9457	Incorporated as Tomarinsky Urban Okrug
Tymovsky District	Тымовский район	urban-type settlement of Tymovskoye	16212	Incorporated as Tymovsky Urban Okrug
Uglegorsky District	Углегорский район	town of Uglegorsk	12156	
Yuzhno-Kurilsky District	Южно-Курильский район	urban-type settlement of Yuzhno-Kurilsk	9501	Incorporated as Yuzhno-Kurilsky Urban Okrug

=== Samara Oblast ===
District	Russian name	Administrative center	Population (2010 Census)
Alexeyevsky District	Алексеевский район	selo of Alexeyevka	12274
Bezenchuksky District	Безенчукский район	urban-type settlement of Bezenchuk	42095
Bogatovsky District	Богатовский район	selo of Bogatoye	14142
Bolshechernigovsky District	Большечерниговский район	selo of Bolshaya Chernigovka	19153
Bolsheglushitsky District	Большеглушицкий район	selo of Bolshaya Glushitsa	20477
Borsky District	Борский район	selo of Borskoye	24433
Chelno-Vershinsky District	Челно-Вершинский район	selo of Chelno-Vershiny	16954
Isaklinsky District	Исаклинский район	selo of Isakly	13395
Kamyshlinsky District	Камышлинский район	selo of Kamyshla	11420
Khvorostyansky District	Хворостянский район	selo of Khvorostyanka	16302
Kinel-Cherkassky District	Кинель-Черкасский район	selo of Kinel-Cherkassy	47362
Kinelsky District	Кинельский район	town of Kinel	33258
Klyavlinsky District	Клявлинский район	railway station of Klyavlino	15988
Koshkinsky District	Кошкинский район	selo of Koshki	24194
Krasnoarmeysky District	Красноармейский район	selo of Krasnoarmeyskoye	18050
Krasnoyarsky District	Красноярский район	selo of Krasny Yar	54497
Neftegorsky District	Нефтегорский район	town of Neftegorsk	34478
Pestravsky District	Пестравский район	selo of Pestravka	17779
Pokhvistnevsky District	Похвистневский район	town of Pokhvistnevo	29027
Privolzhsky District	Приволжский район	selo of Privolzhye	24005
Sergiyevsky District	Сергиевский район	selo of Sergiyevsk	47548
Shentalinsky District	Шенталинский район	railway station of Shentala	16656
Shigonsky District	Шигонский район	selo of Shigony	21002
Stavropolsky District	Ставропольский район	city of Tolyatti	54181
Syzransky District	Сызранский район	city of Syzran	25947
Volzhsky District	Волжский район	city of Samara	83377
Yelkhovsky District	Елховский район	selo of Yelkhovka	10046

=== Saratov Oblast ===
District	Russian name	Administrative center	Population (2010 Census)
Alexandrovo-Gaysky District	Александрово-Гайский район	selo of Alexandrov Gay	16855
Arkadaksky District	Аркадакский район	town of Arkadak	26236
Atkarsky District	Аткарский район	town of Atkarsk	16550
Balakovsky District	Балаковский район	city of Balakovo	19617
Balashovsky District	Балашовский район	town of Balashov	31125
Baltaysky District	Балтайский район	selo of Baltay	12282
Bazarno-Karabulaksky District	Базарно-Карабулакский район	work settlement of Bazarny Karabulak	31841
Dergachyovsky District	Дергачёвский район	work settlement of Dergachi	21104
Dukhovnitsky District	Духовницкий район	work settlement of Dukhovnitskoye	12951
Engelssky District	Энгельсский район	city of Engels	44832
Fyodorovsky District	Фёдоровский район	work settlement of Mokrous	20876
Ivanteyevsky District	Ивантеевский район	selo of Ivanteyevka	15186
Kalininsky District	Калининский район	town of Kalininsk	33302
Khvalynsky District	Хвалынский район	town of Khvalynsk	10688
Krasnoarmeysky District	Красноармейский район	town of Krasnoarmeysk	24375
Krasnokutsky District	Краснокутский район	town of Krasny Kut	34676
Krasnopartizansky District	Краснопартизанский район	work settlement of Gorny	13008
Lysogorsky District	Лысогорский район	work settlement of Lysye Gory	19948
Marksovsky District	Марксовский район	town of Marks	33719
Novoburassky District	Новобурасский район	work settlement of Novye Burasy	16359
Novouzensky District	Новоузенский район	town of Novouzensk	32248
Ozinsky District	Озинский район	work settlement of Ozinki	19147
Perelyubsky District	Перелюбский район	selo of Perelyub	14747
Petrovsky District	Петровский район	town of Petrovsk	14538
Pitersky District	Питерский район	selo of Piterka	18054
Pugachyovsky District	Пугачёвский район	town of Pugachyov	20031
Romanovsky District	Романовский район	work settlement of Romanovka	16226
Rovensky District	Ровенский район	work settlement of Rovnoye	16654
Rtishchevsky District	Ртищевский район	town of Rtishchevo	17383
Samoylovsky District	Самойловский район	work settlement of Samoylovka	21451
Saratovsky District	Саратовский район	city of Saratov	48105
Sovetsky District	Советский район	work settlement of Stepnoye	28012
Tatishchevsky District	Татищевский район	work settlement of Tatishchevo	28405
Turkovsky District	Турковский район	work settlement of Turki	12834
Volsky District	Вольский район	town of Volsk	27457
Voskresensky District	Воскресенский район	selo of Voskresenskoye	12098
Yekaterinovsky District	Екатериновский район	work settlement of Yekaterinovka	19798
Yershovsky District	Ершовский район	town of Yershov	41609

=== Federal city of Sevastopol ===
District	Russian name	Population
Balaklavsky District	Балаклавский район	
Gagarinsky District	Гагаринский район	
Leninsky District	Ленинский район	
Nakhimovsky District	Нахимовский район	

=== Smolensk Oblast ===
District	Russian name	Administrative center	Population (2010 Census)
Demidovsky District	Демидовский район	town of Demidov	14039
Dorogobuzhsky District	Дорогобужский район	town of Dorogobuzh	29077
Dukhovshchinsky District	Духовщинский район	town of Dukhovshchina	16658
Gagarinsky District	Гагаринский район	town of Gagarin	48928
Glinkovsky District	Глинковский район	selo of Glinka	4948
Kardymovsky District	Кардымовский район	settlement of Kardymovo	11852
Khislavichsky District	Хиславичский район	settlement of Khislavichi	9070
Kholm-Zhirkovsky District	Холм-Жирковский район	settlement of Kholm-Zhirkovsky	10717
Krasninsky District	Краснинский район	settlement of Krasny	12895
Monastyrshchinsky District	Монастырщинский район	settlement of Monastyrshchina	10788
Novoduginsky District	Новодугинский район	selo of Novodugino	10477
Pochinkovsky District	Починковский район	town of Pochinok	30959
Roslavlsky District	Рославльский район	town of Roslavl	76100
Rudnyansky District	Руднянский район	town of Rudnya	25244
Safonovsky District	Сафоновский район	town of Safonovo	61572
Shumyachsky District	Шумячский район	settlement of Shumyachi	10713
Smolensky District	Смоленский район	city of Smolensk	44964
Sychyovsky District	Сычёвский район	town of Sychyovka	14158
Tyomkinsky District	Тёмкинский район	selo of Tyomkino	6348
Ugransky District	Угранский район	settlement of Ugra	8916
Velizhsky District	Велижский район	town of Velizh	12248
Vyazemsky District	Вяземский район	town of Vyazma	80436
Yartsevsky District	Ярцевский район	town of Yartsevo	55803
Yelninsky District	Ельнинский район	town of Yelnya	14948
Yershichsky District	Ершичский район	selo of Yershichi	7102

=== Stavropol Krai ===
District	Russian name	Administrative center	Population (2010 Census)
Alexandrovsky District	Александровский район	selo of Alexandrovskoye	50235
Andropovsky District	Андроповский район	selo of Kursavka	35437
Apanasenkovsky District	Апанасенковский район	selo of Divnoye	33074
Arzgirsky District	Арзгирский район	selo of Arzgir	26298
Blagodarnensky District	Благодарненский район	town of Blagodarny	62047
Budyonnovsky District	Будённовский район	town of Budyonnovsk	53251
Georgiyevsky District	Георгиевский район	town of Georgiyevsk	101367
Grachyovsky District	Грачёвский район	selo of Grachyovka	36272
Ipatovsky District	Ипатовский район	town of Ipatovo	62751
Izobilnensky District	Изобильненский район	town of Izobilny	103635
Kirovsky District	Кировский район	town of Novopavlovsk	71723
Kochubeyevsky District	Кочубеевский район	selo of Kochubeyevskoye	79557
Krasnogvardeysky District	Красногвардейский район	selo of Krasnogvardeyskoye	40957
Kursky District	Курский район	stanitsa of Kurskaya	54054
Levokumsky District	Левокумский район	selo of Levokumskoye	41499
Mineralovodsky District	Минераловодский район	town of Mineralnye Vody	49404
Neftekumsky District	Нефтекумский район	town of Neftekumsk	68778
Novoalexandrovsky District	Новоалександровский район	town of Novoalexandrovsk	65477
Novoselitsky District	Новоселицкий район	selo of Novoselitskoye	26697
Petrovsky District	Петровский район	town of Svetlograd	78067
Predgorny District	Предгорный район	stanitsa of Yessentukskaya	106775
Shpakovsky District	Шпаковский район	town of Mikhaylovsk	123071
Sovetsky District	Советский район	town of Zelenokumsk	62790
Stepnovsky District	Степновский район	selo of Stepnoye	22192
Trunovsky District	Труновский район	selo of Donskoye	34558
Turkmensky District	Туркменский район	selo of Letnyaya Stavka	25948

=== Sverdlovsk Oblast ===
District	Russian name	Administrative center	Population (2010 Census)	Notes on municipal incorporation
Achitsky District	Ачитский район	work settlement of Achit	16807	Incorporated as Achitsky Urban Okrug
Alapayevsky District	Алапаевский район	town of Alapayevsk	33613	Incorporated as Alapayevskoye Urban Okrug
Artinsky District	Артинский район	work settlement of Arti	29624	Incorporated as Artinsky Urban Okrug
Artyomovsky District	Артёмовский район	town of Artyomovsky	27017	Incorporated as Artyomovsky Urban Okrug
Baykalovsky District	Байкаловский район	selo of Baykalovo	16294	
Beloyarsky District	Белоярский район	work settlement of Beloyarsky	39374	Split between Beloyarsky Urban Okrug and Verkhneye Dubrovo Urban Okrug
Bogdanovichsky District	Богдановичский район	town of Bogdanovich	16357	Incorporated as Bogdanovich Urban Okrug
Garinsky District	Гаринский район	work settlement of Gari	4904	Incorporated as Garinsky Urban Okrug
Irbitsky District	Ирбитский район	town of Irbit	30331	Incorporated as Irbitskoye Urban Okrug
Kamensky District	Каменский район	city of Kamensk-Uralsky	28111	Incorporated as Kamensky Urban Okrug
Kamyshlovsky District	Камышловский район	town of Kamyshlov	28162	
Krasnoufimsky District	Красноуфимский район	town of Krasnoufimsk	28077	Incorporated as Krasnoufimsky Urban Okrug
Nevyansky District	Невьянский район	town of Nevyansk	22833	Split between Nevyansky Urban Okrug and Verkh-Neyvinsky Urban Okrug
Nizhneserginsky District	Нижнесергинский район	town of Nizhniye Sergi	55135	
Novolyalinsky District	Новолялинский район	town of Novaya Lyalya	23564	Incorporated as Novolyalinsky Urban Okrug
Prigorodny District	Пригородный район	city of Nizhny Tagil	38527	Incorporated as Gornouralsky Urban Okrug
Pyshminsky District	Пышминский район	work settlement of Pyshma	20614	Incorporated as Pyshminsky Urban Okrug
Rezhevsky District	Режевский район	town of Rezh	10220	Incorporated as Rezhevskoy Urban Okrug
Serovsky District	Серовский район	town of Serov	23538	Incorporated as Serovsky Urban Okrug
Shalinsky District	Шалинский район	work settlement of Shalya	23834	Split between Shalinsky Urban Okrug and Staroutkinsk Urban Okrug
Slobodo-Turinsky District	Слободо-Туринский район	selo of Turinskaya Sloboda	15091	
Sukholozhsky District	Сухоложский район	town of Sukhoy Log	14451	Incorporated as Sukhoy Log Urban Okrug
Sysertsky District	Сысертский район	town of Sysert	77691	Split between Sysertsky Urban Okrug and Aramilsky Urban Okrug
Taborinsky District	Таборинский район	selo of Tabory	3574	
Talitsky District	Талицкий район	town of Talitsa	47309	Incorporated as Talitsky Urban Okrug
Tavdinsky District	Тавдинский район	town of Tavda	6885	Incorporated as Tavdinsky Urban Okrug
Tugulymsky District	Тугулымский район	work settlement of Tugulym	22581	Incorporated as Tugulymsky Urban Okrug
Turinsky District	Туринский район	town of Turinsk	28274	Incorporated as Turinsky Urban Okrug
Verkhnesaldinsky District	Верхнесалдинский район	town of Verkhnyaya Salda	3306	Incorporated as Verkhnesaldinsky Urban Okrug
Verkhotursky District	Верхотурский район	town of Verkhoturye	16802	Incorporated as Verkhotursky Urban Okrug

=== Tambov Oblast ===
District	Russian name	Administrative center	Population (2010 Census)
Bondarsky District	Бондарский район	selo of Bondari	13191
Gavrilovsky District	Гавриловский район	selo of Gavrilovka 2-ya	12032
Inzhavinsky District	Инжавинский район	work settlement of Inzhavino	23184
Kirsanovsky District	Кирсановский район	town of Kirsanov	21756
Michurinsky District	Мичуринский район	town of Michurinsk	34245
Mordovsky District	Мордовский район	work settlement of Mordovo	19375
Morshansky District	Моршанский район	town of Morshansk	34088
Muchkapsky District	Мучкапский район	work settlement of Muchkapsky	15177
Nikiforovsky District	Никифоровский район	work settlement of Dmitriyevka	20066
Pervomaysky District	Первомайский район	work settlement of Pervomaysky	29277
Petrovsky District	Петровский район	selo of Petrovskoye	19074
Pichayevsky District	Пичаевский район	selo of Pichayevo	14027
Rasskazovsky District	Рассказовский район	town of Rasskazovo	22991
Rzhaksinsky District	Ржаксинский район	work settlement of Rzhaksa	18565
Sampursky District	Сампурский район	settlement of Satinka	14204
Sosnovsky District	Сосновский район	work settlement of Sosnovka	31641
Staroyuryevsky District	Староюрьевский район	selo of Staroyuryevo	14553
Tambovsky District	Тамбовский район	city of Tambov	102786
Tokaryovsky District	Токарёвский район	work settlement of Tokaryovka	17898
Umyotsky District	Умётский район	work settlement of Umyot	12044
Uvarovsky District	Уваровский район	town of Uvarovo	11221
Zherdevsky District	Жердевский район	town of Zherdevka	30331
Znamensky District	Знаменский район	work settlement of Znamenka	18405

=== Republic of Tatarstan ===
District	Russian name	Administrative center	Population (2010 Census)
Agryzsky District	Агрызский район	town of Agryz	36626
Aksubayevsky District	Аксубаевский район	urban-type settlement of Aksubayevo	32161
Aktanyshsky District	Актанышский район	selo of Aktanysh	31971
Alexeyevsky District	Алексеевский район	urban-type settlement of Alexeyevskoye	26236
Alkeyevsky District	Алькеевский район	selo of Bazarnye Mataki	19991
Almetyevsky District	Альметьевский район	city of Almetyevsk	51100
Apastovsky District	Апастовский район	urban-type settlement of Apastovo	21627
Arsky District	Арский район	town of Arsk	51667
Atninsky District	Атнинский район	selo of Bolshaya Atnya	13650
Aznakayevsky District	Азнакаевский район	town of Aznakayevo	29694
Baltasinsky District	Балтасинский район	urban-type settlement of Baltasi	33879
Bavlinsky District	Бавлинский район	town of Bavly	14161
Bugulminsky District	Бугульминский район	town of Bugulma	22261
Buinsky District	Буинский район	town of Buinsk	25101
Cheremshansky District	Черемшанский район	selo of Cheremshan	20361
Chistopolsky District	Чистопольский район	town of Chistopol	19406
Drozhzhanovsky District	Дрожжановский район	selo of Staroye Drozhzhanoye	25753
Kamsko-Ustyinsky District	Камско-Устьинский район	urban-type settlement of Kamskoye Ustye	16904
Kaybitsky District	Кайбицкий район	selo of Bolshiye Kaybitsy	14898
Kukmorsky District	Кукморский район	urban-type settlement of Kukmor	52021
Laishevsky District	Лаишевский район	town of Laishevo	36516
Leninogorsky District	Лениногорский район	town of Leninogorsk	22700
Mamadyshsky District	Мамадышский район	town of Mamadysh	45005
Mendeleyevsky District	Менделеевский район	town of Mendeleyevsk	30377
Menzelinsky District	Мензелинский район	town of Menzelinsk	29359
Muslyumovsky District	Муслюмовский район	selo of Muslyumovo	21884
Nizhnekamsky District	Нижнекамский район	city of Nizhnekamsk	37860
Novosheshminsky District	Новошешминский район	selo of Novosheshminsk	14179
Nurlatsky District	Нурлатский район	town of Nurlat	27519
Pestrechinsky District	Пестречинский район	selo of Pestretsy	29023
Rybno-Slobodsky District	Рыбно-Слободский район	urban-type settlement of Rybnaya Sloboda	27630
Sabinsky District	Сабинский район	urban-type settlement of Bogatye Saby	31038
Sarmanovsky District	Сармановский район	selo of Sarmanovo	36681
Spassky District	Спасский район	town of Bolgar	20554
Tetyushsky District	Тетюшский район	town of Tetyushi	24875
Tukayevsky District	Тукаевский район	city of Naberezhnye Chelny	36561
Tyulyachinsky District	Тюлячинский район	selo of Tyulyachi	14273
Verkhneuslonsky District	Верхнеуслонский район	selo of Verkhny Uslon	16641
Vysokogorsky District	Высокогорский район	settlement of zheleznodorozhnoy stantsii Vysokaya Gora	43207
Yelabuzhsky District	Елабужский район	town of Yelabuga	10904
Yutazinsky District	Ютазинский район	urban-type settlement of Urussu	21615
Zainsky District	Заинский район	town of Zainsk	15978
Zelenodolsky District	Зеленодольский район	town of Zelenodolsk	60878

=== Tomsk Oblast ===
District	Russian name	Administrative center	Population (2010 Census)
Alexandrovsky District	Александровский район	selo of Alexandrovskoye	8686
Asinovsky District	Асиновский район	town of Asino	36459
Bakcharsky District	Бакчарский район	selo of Bakchar	13419
Chainsky District	Чаинский район	selo of Podgornoye	12920
Kargasoksky District	Каргасокский район	selo of Kargasok	21814
Kolpashevsky District	Колпашевский район	town of Kolpashevo	41183
Kozhevnikovsky District	Кожевниковский район	selo of Kozhevnikovo	20967
Krivosheinsky District	Кривошеинский район	selo of Krivosheino	13285
Molchanovsky District	Молчановский район	selo of Molchanovo	13446
Parabelsky District	Парабельский район	selo of Parabel	12595
Pervomaysky District	Первомайский район	selo of Pervomayskoye	18947
Shegarsky District	Шегарский район	selo of Melnikovo	20306
Teguldetsky District	Тегульдетский район	selo of Teguldet	6937
Tomsky District	Томский район	city of Tomsk	68652
Verkhneketsky District	Верхнекетский район	work settlement of Bely Yar	17052
Zyryansky District	Зырянский район	selo of Zyryanskoye	13179

=== Tula Oblast ===
District	Russian name	Administrative center	Population (2010 Census)	Notes on municipal incorporation
Aleksinsky District	Алексинский район	town of Aleksin	74326	Split between Aleksin Urban Okrug and Novogurovsky Urban Okrug
Arsenyevsky District	Арсеньевский район	work settlement of Arsenyevo	12209	
Belyovsky District	Белёвский район	town of Belyov	20952	
Bogoroditsky District	Богородицкий район	town of Bogoroditsk	51643	
Chernsky District	Чернский район	work settlement of Chern	20476	
Dubensky District	Дубенский район	work settlement of Dubna	14618	
Kamensky District	Каменский район	selo of Arkhangelskoye	9548	
Kimovsky District	Кимовский район	town of Kimovsk	42853	
Kireyevsky District	Киреевский район	town of Kireyevsk	75142	
Kurkinsky District	Куркинский район	work settlement of Kurkino	10830	
Leninsky District	Ленинский район	settlement of Leninsky	63355	Incorporated as a part of Tula Urban Okrug
Novomoskovsky District	Новомосковский район	city of Novomoskovsk	143848	Incorporated as Novomoskovsk Urban Okrug
Odoyevsky District	Одоевский район	work settlement of Odoyev	13184	
Plavsky District	Плавский район	town of Plavsk	27778	
Shchyokinsky District	Щёкинский район	town of Shchyokino	106595	
Suvorovsky District	Суворовский район	town of Suvorov	37637	
Tyoplo-Ogaryovsky District	Тёпло-Огарёвский район	work settlement of Tyoploye	12705	
Uzlovsky District	Узловский район	town of Uzlovaya	85173	
Venyovsky District	Венёвский район	town of Venyov	33940	
Volovsky District	Воловский район	work settlement of Volovo	13596	
Yasnogorsky District	Ясногорский район	town of Yasnogorsk	31152	
Yefremovsky District	Ефремовский район	town of Yefremov	64227	Incorporated as Yefremov Urban Okrug
Zaoksky District	Заокский район	work settlement of Zaoksky	22368	

=== Tuva Republic ===
District	Russian name	Administrative center	Population (2010 Census)
Barun-Khemchiksky District	Барун-Хемчикский район	selo of Kyzyl-Mazhalyk	12847
Bay-Tayginsky District	Бай-Тайгинский район	selo of Teeli	10803
Chaa-Kholsky District	Чаа-Хольский район	selo of Chaa-Khol	6036
Chedi-Kholsky District	Чеди-Хольский район	selo of Khovu-Aksy	7685
Dzun-Khemchiksky District	Дзун-Хемчикский район	town of Chadan	19918
Erzinsky District	Эрзинский район	selo of Erzin	8280
Kaa-Khemsky District	Каа-Хемский район	selo of Saryg-Sep	12279
Kyzylsky District	Кызылский район	urban-type settlement of Kaa-Khem	27659
Mongun-Tayginsky District	Монгун-Тайгинский район	selo of Mugur-Aksy	5661
Ovyursky District	Овюрский район	selo of Khandagayty	7022
Piy-Khemsky District	Пий-Хемский район	town of Turan	10092
Sut-Kholsky District	Сут-Хольский район	selo of Sug-Aksy	8029
Tandinsky District	Тандинский район	selo of Bay-Khaak	12891
Tere-Kholsky District	Тере-Хольский район	selo of Kungurtug	1882
Tes-Khemsky District	Тес-Хемский район	selo of Samagaltay	8174
Todzhinsky District	Тоджинский район	selo of Toora-Khem	6020
Ulug-Khemsky District	Улуг-Хемский район	town of Shagonar	19266

=== Tver Oblast ===
District	Russian name	Administrative center	Population (2010 Census)
Andreapolsky District	Андреапольский район	town of Andreapol	13756
Belsky District	Бельский район	town of Bely	6582
Bezhetsky District	Бежецкий район	town of Bezhetsk	36701
Bologovsky District	Бологовский район	town of Bologoye	38557
Firovsky District	Фировский район	urban-type settlement of Firovo	9396
Kalininsky District	Калининский район	city of Tver	52047
Kalyazinsky District	Калязинский район	town of Kalyazin	21688
Kashinsky District	Кашинский район	town of Kashin	27410
Kesovogorsky District	Кесовогорский район	urban-type settlement of Kesova Gora	8199
Kimrsky District	Кимрский район	town of Kimry	13190
Konakovsky District	Конаковский район	town of Konakovo	87125
Krasnokholmsky District	Краснохолмский район	town of Krasny Kholm	11835
Kuvshinovsky District	Кувшиновский район	town of Kuvshinovo	15386
Lesnoy District	Лесной район	selo of Lesnoye	5252
Likhoslavlsky District	Лихославльский район	town of Likhoslavl	28492
Maksatikhinsky District	Максатихинский район	urban-type settlement of Maksatikha	16723
Molokovsky District	Молоковский район	urban-type settlement of Molokovo	5235
Nelidovsky District	Нелидовский район	town of Nelidovo	30731
Oleninsky District	Оленинский район	urban-type settlement of Olenino	12675
Ostashkovsky District	Осташковский район	town of Ostashkov	23761
Penovsky District	Пеновский район	urban-type settlement of Peno	6864
Rameshkovsky District	Рамешковский район	urban-type settlement of Rameshki	14988
Rzhevsky District	Ржевский район	town of Rzhev	12480
Sandovsky District	Сандовский район	urban-type settlement of Sandovo	6811
Selizharovsky District	Селижаровский район	urban-type settlement of Selizharovo	12722
Sonkovsky District	Сонковский район	urban-type settlement of Sonkovo	8553
Spirovsky District	Спировский район	urban-type settlement of Spirovo	12203
Staritsky District	Старицкий район	town of Staritsa	24056
Toropetsky District	Торопецкий район	town of Toropets	20526
Torzhoksky District	Торжокский район	town of Torzhok	22534
Udomelsky District	Удомельский район	town of Udomlya	40292
Vesyegonsky District	Весьегонский район	town of Vesyegonsk	13481
Vyshnevolotsky District	Вышневолоцкий район	town of Vyshny Volochyok	25421
Zapadnodvinsky District	Западнодвинский район	town of Zapadnaya Dvina	16018
Zharkovsky District	Жарковский район	urban-type settlement of Zharkovsky	6132
Zubtsovsky District	Зубцовский район	town of Zubtsov	17216

=== Tyumen Oblast ===
District	Russian name	Administrative center	Population (2010 Census)	Notes on municipal incorporation
Abatsky District	Абатский район	selo of Abatskoye	19837	
Armizonsky District	Армизонский район	selo of Armizonskoye	10064	
Aromashevsky District	Аромашевский район	selo of Aromashevo	12202	
Berdyuzhsky District	Бердюжский район	selo of Berdyuzhye	11490	
Golyshmanovsky District	Голышмановский район	work settlement of Golyshmanovo	26747	
Isetsky District	Исетский район	selo of Isetskoye	26061	
Ishimsky District	Ишимский район	town of Ishim	31085	
Kazansky District	Казанский район	selo of Kazanskoye	22490	
Nizhnetavdinsky District	Нижнетавдинский район	selo of Nizhnyaya Tavda	23048	
Omutinsky District	Омутинский район	selo of Omutinskoye	19608	
Sladkovsky District	Сладковский район	selo of Sladkovo	12264	
Sorokinsky District	Сорокинский район	selo of Bolshoye Sorokino	10254	
Tobolsky District	Тобольский район	town of Tobolsk	22354	
Tyumensky District	Тюменский район	city of Tyumen	107175	
Uporovsky District	Упоровский район	selo of Uporovo	20662	
Uvatsky District	Уватский район	selo of Uvat	19452	
Vagaysky District	Вагайский район	selo of Vagay	22539	
Vikulovsky District	Викуловский район	selo of Vikulovo	16435	
Yalutorovsky District	Ялуторовский район	town of Yalutorovsk	14461	
Yarkovsky District	Ярковский район	selo of Yarkovo	23184	
Yurginsky District	Юргинский район	selo of Yurginskoye	12313	
Zavodoukovsky District	Заводоуковский район	town of Zavodoukovsk	21101	Incorporated as a part of Zavodoukovsky Urban Okrug

=== Udmurt Republic ===
District	Russian name	Administrative center	Population (2010 Census)
Alnashsky District	Алнашский район	selo of Alnashi	20403
Balezinsky District	Балезинский район	settlement of Balezino	34617
Debyossky District	Дебёсский район	selo of Debyosy	12665
Glazovsky District	Глазовский район	town of Glazov	17132
Grakhovsky District	Граховский район	selo of Grakhovo	9354
Igrinsky District	Игринский район	settlement of Igra	38194
Kambarsky District	Камбарский район	town of Kambarka	18106
Karakulinsky District	Каракулинский район	selo of Karakulino	12230
Kezsky District	Кезский район	settlement of Kez	22911
Kiyasovsky District	Киясовский район	selo of Kiyasovo	10305
Kiznersky District	Кизнерский район	settlement of Kizner	20263
Krasnogorsky District	Красногорский район	selo of Krasnogorskoye	10347
Malopurginsky District	Малопургинский район	selo of Malaya Purga	33058
Mozhginsky District	Можгинский район	town of Mozhga	28293
Sarapulsky District	Сарапульский район	selo of Sigayevo	24625
Seltinsky District	Селтинский район	selo of Selty	11368
Sharkansky District	Шарканский район	selo of Sharkan	19100
Syumsinsky District	Сюмсинский район	selo of Syumsi	13401
Uvinsky District	Увинский район	settlement of Uva	39671
Vavozhsky District	Вавожский район	selo of Vavozh	16351
Votkinsky District	Воткинский район	town of Votkinsk	24114
Yakshur-Bodyinsky District	Якшур-Бодьинский район	selo of Yakshur-Bodya	21467
Yarsky District	Ярский район	settlement of Yar	15286
Yukamensky District	Юкаменский район	selo of Yukamenskoye	10207
Zavyalovsky District	Завьяловский район	selo of Zavyalovo	66000

=== Ulyanovsk Oblast ===
District	Russian name	Administrative center	Population (2010 Census)
Baryshsky District	Барышский район	town of Barysh	44034
Bazarnosyzgansky District	Базарносызганский район	work settlement of Bazarny Syzgan	10083
Cherdaklinsky District	Чердаклинский район	work settlement of Cherdakly	41449
Inzensky District	Инзенский район	town of Inza	33877
Karsunsky District	Карсунский район	work settlement of Karsun	25170
Kuzovatovsky District	Кузоватовский район	work settlement of Kuzovatovo	22377
Maynsky District	Майнский район	work settlement of Mayna	25826
Melekessky District	Мелекесский район	city of Dimitrovgrad	36718
Nikolayevsky District	Николаевский район	work settlement of Nikolayevka	27211
Novomalyklinsky District	Новомалыклинский район	selo of Novaya Malykla	15379
Novospassky District	Новоспасский район	work settlement of Novospasskoye	22478
Pavlovsky District	Павловский район	work settlement of Pavlovka	15109
Radishchevsky District	Радищевский район	work settlement of Radishchevo	14284
Sengileyevsky District	Сенгилеевский район	town of Sengiley	23260
Starokulatkinsky District	Старокулаткинский район	work settlement of Staraya Kulatka	14731
Staromaynsky District	Старомайнский район	work settlement of Staraya Mayna	18132
Sursky District	Сурский район	work settlement of Surskoye	19430
Terengulsky District	Тереньгульский район	work settlement of Terenga	18761
Tsilninsky District	Цильнинский район	selo of Bolshoye Nagatkino	27543
Ulyanovsky District	Ульяновский район	work settlement of Isheyevka	36669
Veshkaymsky District	Вешкаймский район	work settlement of Veshkayma	19801

=== Vladimir Oblast ===
District	Russian name	Administrative center	Population (2010 Census)
Alexandrovsky District	Александровский район	town of Alexandrov	113900
Gorokhovetsky District	Гороховецкий район	town of Gorokhovets	22923
Gus-Khrustalny District	Гусь-Хрустальный район	town of Gus-Khrustalny	44883
Kameshkovsky District	Камешковский район	town of Kameshkovo	30466
Kirzhachsky District	Киржачский район	town of Kirzhach	42159
Kolchuginsky District	Кольчугинский район	town of Kolchugino	56351
Kovrovsky District	Ковровский район	city of Kovrov	31477
Melenkovsky District	Меленковский район	town of Melenki	36464
Muromsky District	Муромский район	city of Murom	24991
Petushinsky District	Петушинский район	town of Petushki	68062
Selivanovsky District	Селивановский район	settlement of Krasnaya Gorbatka	18610
Sobinsky District	Собинский район	town of Sobinka	58801
Sudogodsky District	Судогодский район	town of Sudogda	41177
Suzdalsky District	Суздальский район	town of Suzdal	44114
Vyaznikovsky District	Вязниковский район	town of Vyazniki	80987
Yuryev-Polsky District	Юрьев-Польский район	town of Yuryev-Polsky	36747

=== Volgograd Oblast ===
District	Russian name	Administrative center	Population (2010 Census)	Notes on municipal incorporation
Alexeyevsky District	Алексеевский район	stanitsa of Alexeyevskaya	18166	
Bykovsky District	Быковский район	work settlement of Bykovo	27055	
Chernyshkovsky District	Чернышковский район	work settlement of Chernyshkovsky	16873	
Danilovsky District	Даниловский район	work settlement of Danilovka	16908	
Dubovsky District	Дубовский район	town of Dubovka	30108	
Frolovsky District	Фроловский район	town of Frolovo	14631	The settlement of Prigorodny serves as the administrative center of Frolovsky Municipal District
Gorodishchensky District	Городищенский район	work settlement of Gorodishche	60188	
Ilovlinsky District	Иловлинский район	work settlement of Ilovlya	33168	
Kalachyovsky District	Калачёвский район	town of Kalach-na-Donu	58524	
Kamyshinsky District	Камышинский район	city of Kamyshin	42893	
Kikvidzensky District	Киквидзенский район	stanitsa of Preobrazhenskaya	17669	
Kletsky District	Клетский район	stanitsa of Kletskaya	17858	
Kotelnikovsky District	Котельниковский район	town of Kotelnikovo	37584	
Kotovsky District	Котовский район	town of Kotovo	34477	
Kumylzhensky District	Кумылженский район	stanitsa of Kumylzhenskaya	21425	
Leninsky District	Ленинский район	town of Leninsk	30375	
Mikhaylovsky District	Михайловский район	town of Mikhaylovka	25936	
Nekhayevsky District	Нехаевский район	stanitsa of Nekhayevskaya	15588	
Nikolayevsky District	Николаевский район	town of Nikolayevsk	32034	
Novoanninsky District	Новоаннинский район	town of Novoanninsky	37306	
Novonikolayevsky District	Новониколаевский район	work settlement of Novonikolayevsky	22618	
Oktyabrsky District	Октябрьский район	work settlement of Oktyabrsky	21760	
Olkhovsky District	Ольховский район	selo of Olkhovka	17626	
Pallasovsky District	Палласовский район	town of Pallasovka	43293	
Rudnyansky District	Руднянский район	work settlement of Rudnya	17437	
Serafimovichsky District	Серафимовичский район	town of Serafimovich	25378	
Sredneakhtubinsky District	Среднеахтубинский район	work settlement of Srednyaya Akhtuba	58962	
Staropoltavsky District	Старополтавский район	selo of Staraya Poltavka	20363	
Surovikinsky District	Суровикинский район	town of Surovikino	37104	
Svetloyarsky District	Светлоярский район	work settlement of Svetly Yar	38355	
Uryupinsky District	Урюпинский район	town of Uryupinsk	28775	
Yelansky District	Еланский район	work settlement of Yelan	33064	
Zhirnovsky District	Жирновский район	town of Zhirnovsk	43685	

=== Vologda Oblast ===
District	Russian name	Administrative center	Population (2010 Census)
Babayevsky District	Бабаевский район	town of Babayevo	21944
Babushkinsky District	Бабушкинский район	selo of imeni Babushkina	12779
Belozersky District	Белозерский район	town of Belozersk	17271
Chagodoshchensky District	Чагодощенский район	work settlement of Chagoda	13865
Cherepovetsky District	Череповецкий район	city of Cherepovets	41025
Gryazovetsky District	Грязовецкий район	town of Gryazovets	36820
Kaduysky District	Кадуйский район	work settlement of Kaduy	17109
Kharovsky District	Харовский район	town of Kharovsk	16622
Kichmengsko-Gorodetsky District	Кичменгско-Городецкий район	selo of Kichmengsky Gorodok	18485
Kirillovsky District	Кирилловский район	town of Kirillov	15877
Mezhdurechensky District	Междуреченский район	selo of Shuyskoye	6112
Nikolsky District	Никольский район	town of Nikolsk	22414
Nyuksensky District	Нюксенский район	selo of Nyuksenitsa	9777
Sheksninsky District	Шекснинский район	work settlement of Sheksna	33375
Sokolsky District	Сокольский район	town of Sokol	12947
Syamzhensky District	Сямженский район	selo of Syamzha	8745
Tarnogsky District	Тарногский район	selo of Tarnogsky Gorodok	12838
Totemsky District	Тотемский район	town of Totma	23315
Ust-Kubinsky District	Усть-Кубинский район	selo of Ustye	8094
Ustyuzhensky District	Устюженский район	town of Ustyuzhna	18738
Vashkinsky District	Вашкинский район	selo of Lipin Bor	8089
Velikoustyugsky District	Великоустюгский район	town of Veliky Ustyug	18087
Verkhovazhsky District	Верховажский район	selo of Verkhovazhye	13898
Vologodsky District	Вологодский район	city of Vologda	50438
Vozhegodsky District	Вожегодский район	work settlement of Vozhega	16790
Vytegorsky District	Вытегорский район	town of Vytegra	27139

=== Voronezh Oblast ===
District	Russian name	Administrative center	Population (2010 Census)
Anninsky District	Аннинский район	urban-type settlement of Anna	45385
Bobrovsky District	Бобровский район	town of Bobrov	49494
Bogucharsky District	Богучарский район	town of Boguchar	37198
Buturlinovsky District	Бутурлиновский район	town of Buturlinovka	52575
Ertilsky District	Эртильский район	town of Ertil	25728
Gribanovsky District	Грибановский район	urban-type settlement of Gribanovsky	33073
Kalacheyevsky District	Калачеевский район	town of Kalach	57242
Kamensky District	Каменский район	urban-type settlement of Kamenka	20612
Kantemirovsky District	Кантемировский район	work settlement of Kantemirovka	38081
Kashirsky District	Каширский район	selo of Kashirskoye	25268
Khokholsky District	Хохольский район	work settlement of Khokholsky	29814
Liskinsky District	Лискинский район	town of Liski	105704
Nizhnedevitsky District	Нижнедевицкий район	selo of Nizhnedevitsk	20611
Novokhopyorsky District	Новохопёрский район	town of Novokhopyorsk	41128
Novousmansky District	Новоусманский район	selo of Novaya Usman	73034
Olkhovatsky District	Ольховатский район	work settlement of Olkhovatka	24218
Ostrogozhsky District	Острогожский район	town of Ostrogozhsk	61291
Paninsky District	Панинский район	work settlement of Panino	29231
Pavlovsky District	Павловский район	town of Pavlovsk	57081
Petropavlovsky District	Петропавловский район	selo of Petropavlovka	20042
Podgorensky District	Подгоренский район	urban-type settlement of Podgorensky	27340
Povorinsky District	Поворинский район	town of Povorino	34030
Ramonsky District	Рамонский район	work settlement of Ramon	32027
Repyovsky District	Репьёвский район	selo of Repyovka	16027
Rossoshansky District	Россошанский район	town of Rossosh	94694
Semiluksky District	Семилукский район	town of Semiluki	67247
Talovsky District	Таловский район	work settlement of Talovaya	42603
Ternovsky District	Терновский район	selo of Ternovka	22125
Verkhnekhavsky District	Верхнехавский район	selo of Verkhnyaya Khava	25156
Verkhnemamonsky District	Верхнемамонский район	selo of Verkhny Mamon	21659
Vorobyovsky District	Воробьёвский район	selo of Vorobyovka	18933

=== Yamalo-Nenets Autonomous Okrug ===
District	Russian name	Administrative center	Population (2010 Census)
Krasnoselkupsky District	Красноселькупский район	selo of Krasnoselkup	6204
Nadymsky District	Надымский район	town of Nadym	19919
Priuralsky District	Приуральский район	selo of Aksarka	14995
Purovsky District	Пуровский район	town of Tarko-Sale	51280
Shuryshkarsky District	Шурышкарский район	selo of Muzhi	9814
Tazovsky District	Тазовский район	settlement of Tazovsky	16537
Yamalsky District	Ямальский район	selo of Yar-Sale	16310

=== Yaroslavl Oblast ===
District	Russian name	Administrative center	Population (2010 Census)
Bolsheselsky District	Большесельский район	selo of Bolshoye Selo	9906
Borisoglebsky District	Борисоглебский район	work settlement of Borisoglebsky	12630
Breytovsky District	Брейтовский район	selo of Breytovo	7034
Danilovsky District	Даниловский район	town of Danilov	26072
Gavrilov-Yamsky District	Гаврилов-Ямский район	town of Gavrilov-Yam	26558
Lyubimsky District	Любимский район	town of Lyubim	11789
Myshkinsky District	Мышкинский район	town of Myshkin	10329
Nekouzsky District	Некоузский район	selo of Novy Nekouz	15688
Nekrasovsky District	Некрасовский район	work settlement of Nekrasovskoye	21573
Pereslavsky District	Переславский район	town of Pereslavl-Zalessky	20352
Pervomaysky District	Первомайский район	work settlement of Prechistoye	11012
Poshekhonsky District	Пошехонский район	town of Poshekhonye	14292
Rostovsky District	Ростовский район	town of Rostov	34062
Rybinsky District	Рыбинский район	city of Rybinsk	28153
Tutayevsky District	Тутаевский район	town of Tutayev	15949
Uglichsky District	Угличский район	town of Uglich	13255
Yaroslavsky District	Ярославский район	city of Yaroslavl	52328

=== Zabaykalsky Krai ===
District	Russian name	Administrative center	Population (2010 Census)
Aginsky District	Агинский район	urban-type settlement of Aginskoye	34354
Akshinsky District	Акшинский район	selo of Aksha	10682
Alexandrovo-Zavodsky District	Александрово-Заводский район	selo of Alexandrovsky Zavod	8726
Baleysky District	Балейский район	town of Baley	20500
Borzinsky District	Борзинский район	town of Borzya	51647
Chernyshevsky District	Чернышевский район	urban-type settlement of Chernyshevsk	35019
Chitinsky District	Читинский район	city of Chita	64642
Duldurginsky District	Дульдургинский район	selo of Duldurga	15350
Gazimuro-Zavodsky District	Газимуро-Заводский район	selo of Gazimursky Zavod	9407
Kalarsky District	Каларский район	selo of Chara	9051
Kalgansky District	Калганский район	selo of Kalga	8771
Karymsky District	Карымский район	urban-type settlement of Karymskoye	37161
Khiloksky District	Хилокский район	town of Khilok	31760
Krasnochikoysky District	Красночикойский район	selo of Krasny Chikoy	19453
Krasnokamensky District	Краснокаменский район	town of Krasnokamensk	64597
Kyrinsky District	Кыринский район	selo of Kyra	13650
Mogochinsky District	Могочинский район	town of Mogocha	25508
Mogoytuysky District	Могойтуйский район	urban-type settlement of Mogoytuy	27463
Nerchinsko-Zavodsky District	Нерчинско-Заводский район	selo of Nerchinsky Zavod	10782
Nerchinsky District	Нерчинский район	town of Nerchinsk	28455
Olovyanninsky District	Оловяннинский район	urban-type settlement of Olovyannaya	43494
Ononsky District	Ононский район	selo of Nizhny Tsasuchey	11199
Petrovsk-Zabaykalsky District	Петровск-Забайкальский район	town of Petrovsk-Zabaykalsky	37900
Priargunsky District	Приаргунский район	urban-type settlement of Priargunsk	21831
Shelopuginsky District	Шелопугинский район	selo of Shelopugino	8369
Shilkinsky District	Шилкинский район	town of Shilka	43194
Sretensky District	Сретенский район	town of Sretensk	23311
Tungiro-Olyokminsky District	Тунгиро-Олёкминский район	selo of Tupik	1432
Tungokochensky District	Тунгокоченский район	selo of Verkh-Usugli	12685
Ulyotovsky District	Улетовский район	selo of Ulyoty	18946
Zabaykalsky District	Забайкальский район	urban-type settlement of Zabaykalsk	20485
