= Kanash constituency =

Russian legislative constituency

Kanash single-member constituency
- Constituency of the Russian State Duma
- Deputy: Anatoly Aksakov; A Just Russia
- Federal subject: Chuvash Republic
- Districts: Batyrevsky, Cheboksarsky (Alatyrkasy, Alymkasy, Atlashevo, Koderkasy, Lipovo, Nizhny Magaz, Tolikovo, Tomakasy, Urayevo-Magaz, Verkhny Magaz, Yerdovo), Cheboksary (Kalininsky), Kanash, Kanashsky, Kozlovsky, Komsomolsky, Krasnoarmeysky, Mariinsko-Posadsky, Novocheboksarsk, Shemurshinsky, Tsivilsky, Urmarsky, Yalchiksky, Yantikovsky
- Voters: 447,557 (2026)

The Kanash constituency (No.42 (Note: No.33 in 1993-1995 and 2003-2007, No.32 in 1995-2003, No.37 in 2016–2026)) is a Russian legislative constituency in Chuvashia. The constituency covers eastern half of Chuvashia, including Novocheboksarsk and eastern Cheboksary.

The constituency has been represented since 2016 by A Just Russia deputy Anatoly Aksakov, a seven-term State Duma member, who represented Cheboksary constituency in 2000–2007. Aksakov has been serving as Chairman of the Duma Committee on Financial Markets since October 2016.

== Boundaries ==
1993–2007: Alatyr, Alatyrsky District, Alikovsky District, Batyrevsky District, Ibresinsky District, Kanash, Kanashsky District, Komsomolsky District, Krasnoarmeysky District, Krasnochetaysky District, Morgaushsky District, Poretsky District, Shemurshinsky District, Shumerlya, Shumerlinsky District, Tsivilsky District, Urmarsky District, Vurnarsky District, Yadrinsky District, Yalchiksky District, Yantikovsky District
The constituency covered most of Chuvashia to the south of Cheboksary metro area, including the towns of Alatyr, Kanash and Sarapul.

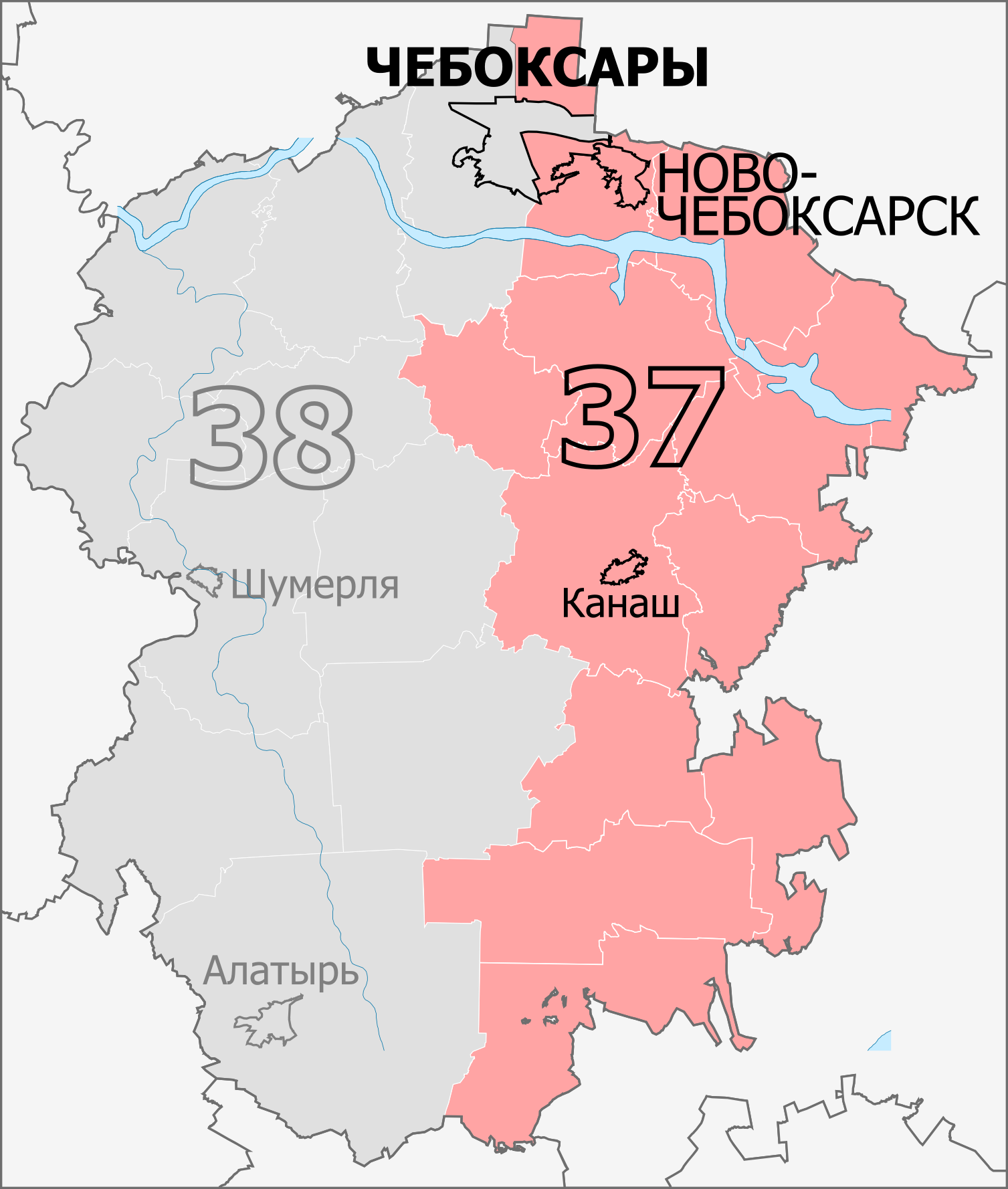
Constituency boundaries from 2016 to 2026

2016–2026: Batyrevsky District, Cheboksarsky District (Abashevo, Akulevskoye, Atlashevskoye, Kugesi, Shinerposinskoye, Sinyalskoye, Sirmaposinskoye), Cheboksary (Kalininsky), Kanash, Kanashsky District, Kozlovsky District, Komsomolsky District, Krasnoarmeysky District, Mariinsko-Posadsky District, Novocheboksarsk, Shemurshinsky District, Tsivilsky District, Urmarsky District, Yalchiksky District, Yantikovsky District
The constituency was re-created for the 2016 election. This seat retained only eastern Chuvashia, swapping the rest with Cheboksary constituency for part of Cheboksary itself, Novocheboksarsk and north-eastern part of the region.

2026–present: Batyrevsky District, Cheboksarsky District (Alatyrkasy, Alymkasy, Atlashevo, Koderkasy, Lipovo, Nizhny Magaz, Tolikovo, Tomakasy, Urayevo-Magaz, Verkhny Magaz, Yerdovo), Cheboksary (Kalininsky), Kanashsky District, Kozlovsky District, Komsomolsky District, Krasnoarmeysky District, Mariinsko-Posadsky District, Novocheboksarsk, Shemurshinsky District, Tsivilsky District, Urmarsky District, Yalchiksky District, Yantikovsky District
After the 2025 redistricting the constituency was slightly altered, losing most of its share of Cheboksarsky District to Cheboksary constituency.

== Members elected ==
Election	Member	Party
1993	Valentin Agafonov	Independent
1995	Valentin Agafonov	Independent
1999	Valentin Shurchanov	Communist Party
2003	Pavel Semyonov	United Russia
2007	Proportional representation - no election by constituency	
2011	Proportional representation - no election by constituency	
2016	Anatoly Aksakov	A Just Russia
2021	Anatoly Aksakov	A Just Russia
2026	Anatoly Aksakov	A Just Russia

== Election results ==
=== 1993 ===
==== Declared candidates ====
- Valentin Agafonov (Independent), former Deputy Chairman of the Supreme Soviet of Russia (1993), former People's Deputy of Russia (1990–1993)
- Yevgeny Dmitriyev (PRES), Deputy Head of the State Antimonopoly Committee Regional Office (1991–present)
- Nikolay Maksimov (DPR), computer science lecturer
- Mikhail Tikhonov (Independent), journalist
- Vyacheslav Tikhonov (Independent), Minister of Security of Chuvashia (1981–present), major general
- Gennady Volkov (Independent), businessman
- Mikhail Yukhma (Independent), writer, journalist

==== Results ====
Summary of the 12 December 1993 Russian legislative election in the Kanash constituency
Candidate	Party	Votes	%
Valentin Agafonov	Independent	130,041	41.01%
Vyacheslav Tikhonov	Independent	–	10.30%
Yevgeny Dmitriyev	Party of Russian Unity and Accord	–	–
Nikolay Maksimov	Democratic Party	–	–
Mikhail Tikhonov	Independent	–	–
Gennady Volkov	Independent	–	–
Mikhail Yukhma	Independent	–	–
Total		317,085	100%

=== 1995 ===
==== Declared candidates ====
- Valentin Agafonov (Independent), incumbent Member of State Duma (1994–present)
- Vladimir Barsukov (KRO), manufacturers' union director
- Lev Kurakov (Independent), Member of Federation Council (1994–present), rector of Chuvash State University (1990–present), 1993–94 presidential candidate
- Gennady Kuzmin (LDPR), electric loader plant foreman
- Svetlana Lyapidovskaya (Common Cause), rector of University of Volga Peoples (1994–present)
- Lyudmila Rulkova (NDR), Deputy Minister of Social Protection of Chuvashia (1992–present)

==== Results ====
Summary of the 17 December 1995 Russian legislative election in the Kanash constituency
Candidate	Party	Votes	%
Valentin Agafonov (incumbent)	Independent	122,179	40.19%
Lev Kurakov	Independent	96,554	31.76%
Gennady Kuzmin	Liberal Democratic Party	17,933	5.90%
Lyudmila Rulkova	Our Home – Russia	15,911	5.23%
Svetlana Lyapidovskaya	Common Cause	12,529	4.12%
Vladimir Barsukov	Congress of Russian Communities	5,518	1.82%
against all		19,491	6.41%
Total		303,977	100%

=== 1999 ===
==== Declared candidates ====
- Valentin Agafonov (Independent), incumbent Member of State Duma (1994–present)
- Pyotr Ivantayev (Independent), First Deputy Premier of Chuvashia (1998–present)
- Vladimir Mayorov (Independent), brick factory director
- Vladimir Mukin (Yabloko), director of the Chuvash State University, Batyrevo branch (1994–present)
- Valentin Shurchanov (CPRF), Chairman of the State Council of the Chuvash Republic (1994–present), 1997 presidential candidate
- Anatoly Zhuromsky (For Civil Dignity), Member of State Council of the Chuvash Republic (1998–present), railroad car repair factory director

==== Failed to qualify ====
- Dmitry Balakin (Independent)
- Andrey Bronitsyn (LDPR), aide to State Duma member
- Valery Timofeyev (SPS), Chuvash State University distance faculty of law dean

==== Did not file ====
- Nikolay Grigoryev (Independent)
- Nikolay Mikhaylov (Independent), gas distribution executive
- Arkady Mineykin (Independent), entrepreneur
- Aleksey Platonov (Independent), surgeon, urologist
- Nikolay Ruzavin (Independent)
- Vladislav Sadyrga (NDR), Member of State Council of the Chuvash Republic (1998–present), gas distribution executive
- Vladimir Vladimirov (Independent), Yantikovsky District Administration staffer

==== Results ====
Summary of the 19 December 1999 Russian legislative election in the Kanash constituency
Candidate	Party	Votes	%
Valentin Shurchanov	Communist Party	114,738	40.26%
Pyotr Ivantayev	Independent	101,366	35.57%
Vladimir Mayorov	Independent	19,839	6.96%
Vladimir Mukin	Yabloko	10,314	3.62%
Valentin Agafonov (incumbent)	Independent	7,406	2.60%
Anatoly Zhuromsky	For Civil Dignity	7,096	2.49%
against all		13,246	4.65%
Total		285,008	100%

=== 2003 ===
==== Declared candidates ====
- Robert Churkin (ORP Rus'), attorney
- Konstantin Ilyin (VR–ES), chairman of the Russian Party of Labor regional office, union activist
- Vladimir Izhederov (Independent), former Member of State Council of the Chuvash Republic (1998–2002), 1997 presidential candidate
- Pavel Semyonov (United Russia), Member of State Council of the Chuvash Republic (2002–present), oil businessman
- Valentin Shurchanov (CPRF), incumbent Member of State Duma (2000–present), 1997 and 2001 presidential candidate
- Nikolay Vladimirov (Yabloko), paralegal

==== Withdrawn candidates ====
- Yevgeny Slepov (PVR-RPZh), Member of State Council of the Chuvash Republic (2002–present), businessman

==== Did not file ====
- Arina Ryzhova (ORP Rus'), auditor (ran in the Cheboksary constituency)

==== Results ====
Summary of the 7 December 2003 Russian legislative election in the Kanash constituency
Candidate	Party	Votes	%
Pavel Semyonov	United Russia	200,810	70.55%
Valentin Shurchanov (incumbent)	Communist Party	56,681	19.91%
Vladimir Izhederov	Independent	3,026	1.06%
Nikolay Vladimirov	Yabloko	2,831	0.99%
Konstantin Ilyin	Great Russia – Eurasian Union	1,917	0.67%
Robert Churkin	United Russian Party Rus'	1,533	0.54%
against all		9,649	3.39%
Total		284,682	100%

=== 2016 ===
==== Declared candidates ====
- Anatoly Aksakov (A Just Russia), Member of State Duma (2000–present), Chairman of the Duma Committee on Economic Policy, Innovations, and Entrepreneurship (2015–present)
- Grigory Danilov (CPRF), former Member of Cheboksary City Assembly of Deputies (2005–2015), consumers' rights advocate
- Aleksandr Kapitonov (Party of Growth), agriculture businessman
- Vladimir Mikhaylov (Rodina), corporate executive
- Valery Pavlov (Patriots of Russia), former Member of Cheboksary City Assembly of Deputies (2005–2015), construction businessman
- Anton Saprykin (Yabloko), unemployed
- Dmitry Semyonov (PARNAS), journalist
- Dmitry Sorokin (GP), Sberbank regional executive
- Konstantin Stepanov (LDPR), Member of Cheboksary City Assembly of Deputies (2015–present), aide to State Duma member Vasily Zhurko
- Anton Trefilov (CPCR), businessman, perennial candidate

==== Withdrawn candidates ====
- Aleksandr Aksakov (The Greens), driver

==== Failed to qualify ====
- Anatoly Aksakov (Independent), unemployed
- Aleksey Lapshin (Independent), construction businessman
- Ksenia Prokopyeva (Independent), cosmetology businesswoman

==== Did not file ====
- Aleksandr Aksakov (Independent), gymnastics coach

==== Declined ====
- Nikolay Malov (United Russia), Deputy Chairman of the State Council of the Chuvash Republic (2015–present), Member of the State Council (2005–present) (lost the primary, ran on the party list)
- Alla Samoylova (United Russia), Minister of Health of Chuvashia (2012–present) (lost the primary)

==== Results ====
Summary of the 18 September 2016 Russian legislative election in the Kanash constituency
Candidate	Party	Votes	%
Anatoly Aksakov	A Just Russia	84,920	29.99%
Aleksandr Kapitonov	Party of Growth	60,580	21.39%
Grigory Danilov	Communist Party	38,603	13.63%
Konstantin Stepanov	Liberal Democratic Party	24,527	8.66%
Vladimir Mikhaylov	Rodina	12,049	4.26%
Valery Pavlov	Patriots of Russia	11,095	3.92%
Dmitry Semyonov	People's Freedom Party	9,974	3.52%
Anton Trefilov	Communists of Russia	9,672	3.42%
Dmitry Sorokin	Civic Platform	5,634	1.99%
Anton Saprykin	Yabloko	4,099	1.45%
Total		283,161	100%

=== 2021 ===
==== Declared candidates ====
- Anatoly Aksakov (SR–ZP), incumbent Member of State Duma (2000–present), Chairman of the Duma Committee on Financial Market (2016–present)
- Aleksandr Andreyev (CPRF), Member of State Council of the Chuvash Republic (2016–present), 2020 head candidate
- Elza Kuzmina (New People), individual entrepreneur
- Leonid Pronin (United Russia), Member of Shumerlya Assembly of Deputies (2015–present), community activist
- Eduard Romanov (Rodina), marketing manager
- Vyacheclav Solovyov (LDPR), Member of State Council of the Chuvash Republic (2016–present), lawyer
- Nikolay Stepanov (RPPSS), Member of Cheboksary City Assembly of Deputies (2005–2010, 2020–present), former Member of State Council of the Chuvash Republic (1998–2002)
- Aleksandr Vorobyov (The Greens), former acting Minister of Natural Resources and Ecology of Chuvashia (2020–2021)

==== Failed to qualify ====
- Vladimir Anisimov (Yabloko), pensioner
- Aleksandr Golitsyn (GP), manager at VEB.RF

==== Results ====
Summary of the 17-19 September 2021 Russian legislative election in the Kanash constituency
Candidate	Party	Votes	%
Anatoly Aksakov (incumbent)	A Just Russia — For Truth	111,123	41.64%
Aleksandr Andreyev	Communist Party	53,390	20.01%
Leonid Pronin	United Russia	37,571	14.08%
Elza Kuzmina	New People	17,241	6.46%
Nikolay Stepanov	Party of Pensioners	16,216	6.08%
Vyacheslav Solovyov	Liberal Democratic Party	10,569	3.69%
Aleksandr Vorobyov	The Greens	5,415	2.03%
Eduard Romanov	Rodina	3,527	1.32%
Total		266,855	100%

=== 2026 ===
==== Declared candidates ====
- Anatoly Aksakov (A Just Russia), incumbent Member of State Duma (2000–present), Chairman of the Duma Committee on Financial Market (2016–present)
- Aleksandr Andreyev (CPRF), Member of State Council of the Chuvash Republic (2016–present), aide to State Duma member Irina Filatova, 2020 head candidate, 2021 candidate for this seat
- Vladimir Ilyin (RPPSS), Member of Cheboksary City Assembly of Deputies (2025–present), businessman, 2025 head candidate
- Viktor Makarov (CPCR), businessman, perennial candidate
- Grigory Mikhaylov (The Greens), former Member of Novocheboksarsk City Assembly of Deputies (2020–2025), Russian Army senior lieutenant
- Maksim Morozov (New People), Member of Cheboksary City Assembly of Deputies (2025–present), agribusinessman, 2025 head candidate
- Eduard Petrov (LDPR), Member of Cheboksary City Assembly of Deputies (2025–present), aide to State Duma member Vladimir Koshelev
- Radimir Yegorov (United Russia), businessman

==== Withdrew after registration ====
- Viktor Stenshin (Yabloko), logistics specialist (disqualified on September 10, 2026, for campaign financing violations)

==== Results ====
Summary of the 18-20 September 2026 Russian legislative election in the Kanash constituency
Candidate	Party	Votes	%
Anatoly Aksakov (incumbent)	A Just Russia	125,203	45.31%
Radimir Yegorov	United Russia	42,432	15.36%
Aleksandr Andreyev	Communist Party	38,416	13.90%
Maksim Morozov	New People	21,910	7.93%
Eduard Petrov	Liberal Democratic Party	15,283	5.53%
Vladimir Ilyin	Party of Pensioners	10,364	3.75%
Viktor Makarov	Communists of Russia	9,815	3.55%
Grigory Mikhaylov	The Greens	6,489	2.35%
Total		276,336	100%
