= Cheboksary constituency =

Russian legislative constituency

Cheboksary single-member constituency
- Constituency of the Russian State Duma
- Deputy: Alla Salayeva; United Russia
- Federal subject: Chuvash Republic
- Districts: Alatyr, Alatyrsky, Alikovsky, most of Cheboksarsky, Cheboksary (Leninsky, Moskovsky), Ibresinsky, Krasnochetaysky, Morgaushsky, Poretsky, Shumerlinsky, Shumerlya, Vurnarsky, Yadrinsky
- Voters: 458,048 (2026)

The Cheboksary constituency (No.43 (Note: No. 34 in 1993–1995 and 2003–2007, No. 33 in 1995–2003, No.38 in 2016–2026)) is a Russian legislative constituency in Chuvashia. The constituency covers western half of Chuvashia, including western Cheboksary, Alatyr and Shumerlya.

The constituency has been represented since 2021 by United Russia deputy Alla Salayeva, former Deputy Prime Minister of Chuvashia, who won the open seat, succeeding one-term United Russia incumbent Leonid Cherkesov.

== Boundaries ==
1993–2007: Cheboksarsky District, Cheboksary, Novocheboksarsk, Kozlovsky District, Mariinsko-Posadsky District
The constituency covered the republican capital of Cheboksary, industrial satellite city of Novocheboksarsk as well as surrounding area in northern Chuvashia.

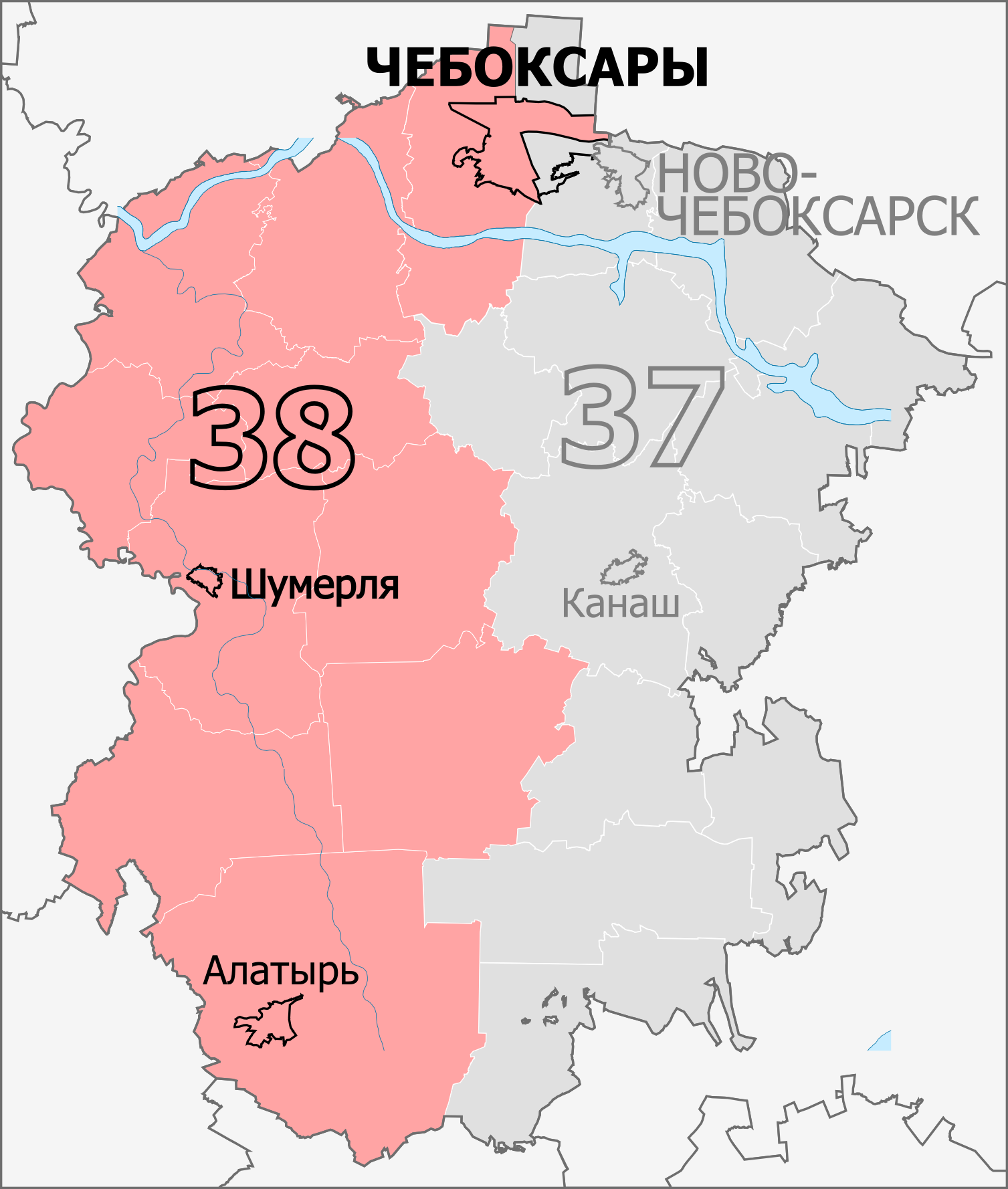
Constituency boundaries from 2016 to 2026

2016–2026: Alatyr, Alatyrsky District, Alikovsky District, Cheboksarsky District (Bolshekatrasskoye, Chirshkasinskoye, Ishakskoye, Ishleyskoye, Kshaushskoye, Lapsarskoye, Sarabakasinskoye, Sinyal-Pokrovskoye, Vurman-Syukterskoye, Yanyshskoye), Cheboksary (Leninsky, Moskovsky), Ibresinsky District, Krasnochetaysky District, Morgaushsky District, Poretsky District, Shumerlinsky District, Shumerlya, Vurnarsky District, Yadrinsky District
The constituency was re-created for the 2016 election. This seat retained only western Cheboksary and Cheboksarsky District, losing the rest to Kanash constituency. In its new configuration the constituency was pushed into western Chuvashia, which was previously part of Kanash constituency.

2026–present: Alatyr, Alatyrsky District, Alikovsky District, most of Cheboksarsky District, Cheboksary (Leninsky, Moskovsky), Ibresinsky District, Krasnochetaysky District, Morgaushsky District, Poretsky District, Shumerlinsky District, Shumerlya, Vurnarsky District, Yadrinsky District
After the 2025 redistricting the constituency was slightly altered, gaining more localities of Cheboksarsky District from Kanash constituency.

== Members elected ==
Election	Member	Party
1993	Nadezhda Bikalova	Independent
1995	Svyatoslav Fyodorov	Party of Workers' Self-Government
1999	Anatoly Aksakov	Independent
2003	Anatoly Aksakov	People's Party
2007	Proportional representation – no election by constituency	
2011	Proportional representation – no election by constituency	
2016	Leonid Cherkesov	United Russia
2021	Alla Salayeva	United Russia
2026	Alla Salayeva	United Russia

== Election results ==
=== 1993 ===
==== Declared candidates ====
- Vitaly Alekseyev (DPR), Chairman of the Cheboksary City Council of People's Deputies (1990–present)
- Vladislav Alekseyev (Independent), expert for the Presidential Envoy to Chuvashia
- Nadezhda Bikalova (Independent), Chairwoman of the Chuvashia Property Fund (1993–present)
- Mikhail Demidov (PRES), Deputy Minister of Justice of Chuvashia (1993–present)
- Lev Fyodorov (Independent), RAN Institute of Geochemistry and Analytical Chemistry leading researcher
- Aleksey Guryev (YaBL), ecological activist
- Svetlana Lyapidovskaya (Independent), advisor to Mayor of Cheboksary
- Stanislav Lyapunov (Civic Union), electronics plant director
- Igor Molyakov (Independent), philosophy senior lecturer
- Anatoly Sharapov (Independent), attorney
- Arseny Suvorov (Independent), businessman
- Ivan Toreyev (Independent), community activist

==== Results ====
Summary of the 12 December 1993 Russian legislative election in the Cheboksary constituency
Candidate	Party	Votes	%
Nadezhda Bikalova	Independent	35,748	13.02%
Igor Molyakov	Independent	34,683	12.60%
Vitaly Alekseyev	Democratic Party	–	–
Vladislav Alekseyev	Independent	–	–
Mikhail Demidov	Party of Russian Unity and Accord	–	–
Lev Fyodorov	Independent	–	–
Aleksey Guryev	Future of Russia–New Names	–	–
Svetlana Lyapidovskaya	Independent	–	–
Stanislav Lyapunov	Civic Union	–	–
Anatoly Sharapov	Independent	–	–
Arseny Suvorov	Independent	–	–
Ivan Toreyev	Independent	–	–
Total		274,487	100%

=== 1995 ===
==== Declared candidates ====
- Alimzhan Abubikerov (AAR), attorney
- Vladislav Alekseyev (Social Democrats), expert for the Presidential Envoy to Chuvashia, 1993 candidate for this seat
- Eduard Arslanov (Common Cause), neuropathologist
- Nadezhda Bikalova (Independent), incumbent Member of State Duma (1994–present)
- Valery Bobkov (BIR), Chernobyl movement activist, painter
- Yury Chetkov (Independent), nonprofit director
- Svyatoslav Fyodorov (PST), former People's Deputy of the Soviet Union (1989–1991), Eye Microsurgery Complex director, leader of the Party of Workers' Self-Government (1995–present)
- Vladimir Izhederov (Independent), Member of State Council of the Chuvash Republic (1994–1995, 1995–present), history teacher
- Eduard Kubarev (DVR–OD), former Chairman of the Supreme Council of Chuvashia (1991–1994), 1993 presidential candidate
- Valery Petrov (PPR–ST), union leader
- Tatyana Petrova (NDR), First Deputy Minister of Finance of Chuvashia
- Galina Ruban (Independent), journalist
- Valery Saperov (People's Union), party secretary
- Anatoly Sharapov (Independent), attorney, 1993 candidate for this seat
- Aleksandr Shipov (LDPR), Member of State Duma (1995–present)
- Gennady Sokolov (Independent), Military Commissioner of Chuvashia (1991–present), Russian Army major general

==== Withdrawn candidates ====
- Oleg Blinov (My Fatherland), theatre actor

==== Results ====
Summary of the 17 December 1995 Russian legislative election in the Cheboksary constituency
Candidate	Party	Votes	%
Svyatoslav Fyodorov	Party of Workers' Self-Government	112,160	41.03%
Nadezhda Bikalova (incumbent)	Independent	69,789	25.53%
Eduard Kubarev	Democratic Choice of Russia – United Democrats	11,347	4.15%
Vladimir Izhederov	Independent	10,668	3.90%
Aleksandr Shipov	Liberal Democratic Party	7,583	2.77%
Tatyana Petrova	Our Home – Russia	6,645	2.43%
Valery Petrov	Trade Unions and Industrialists – Union of Labour	5,009	1.83%
Anatoly Sharapov	Independent	3,817	1.40%
Alimzhan Abubikerov	Russian Lawyers' Association	3,315	1.21%
Valery Bobkov	Ivan Rybkin Bloc	2,925	1.07%
Vladislav Alekseyev	Social Democrats	2,566	0.94%
Yury Chetkov	Independent	2,498	0.91%
Eduard Arlanov	Common Cause	2,185	0.80%
Gennady Sokolov	Independent	1,785	0.65%
Valery Saperov	People's Union	1,124	0.41%
Galina Ruban	Independent	943	0.35%
against all		15,004	5.49%
Total		273,332	100%

=== 1999 ===
==== Declared candidates ====
- Anatoly Aksakov (Independent), Deputy Premier of Chuvashia – Minister of Economy (1998–present)
- Vakhtang Chkuaseli (Independent), former Deputy Governor of Taymyr Autonomous Okrug (1998–1999)
- Vladimir Izhederov (Stalin Bloc), former Member of State Council of the Chuvash Republic (1994–1995, 1995–1998), 1995 candidate for this seat, 1997 presidential candidate
- Vitaly Malinov (DPA), Member of State Council of the Chuvash Republic (1996–present)
- Valentin Malyutkin (Yabloko), Chuvash State University faculty of law dean, retired militsiya colonel
- Yury Metlov (Independent), writer
- Valery Mikhaylov (Independent), former People's Deputy of Russia (1990–1993)
- Igor Molyakov (CPRF), Member of State Council of the Chuvash Republic (1994–1995, 1995–present), 1993 candidate for this seat
- Oleg Nasakin (LDPR), Chuvash State University faculty of chemistry dean
- Vladimir Petrov (Independent), Ministry of Finance of Russia Audit Department Regional Office official

==== Withdrawn candidates ====
- Valery Pavlov (Independent), former chairman of the Social Democratic Party of Chuvashia
- Aleksandr Vorotnikov (NDR), Member of State Council of the Chuvash Republic (1998–present)

==== Failed to qualify ====
- Mikhail Fyodorov (Independent)
- Vladimir Fyodorov (Independent), former Chairman of the State Antimonopoly Committee Regional Office, 1993 presidential candidate
- Ivan Kiriyenko (Independent)

==== Did not file ====
- Vladislav Alekseyev (Nikolayev–Fyodorov Bloc), expert for the Presidential Envoy to Chuvashia, 1993 and 1995 Social Democrats candidate for this seat
- Nadezhda Bikalova (ROS), former Member of State Duma (1994–1995)
- Yury Mikushkin (Independent)
- Nikolay Nikolsky (KTR–zSS), mechanic
- Edison Patmar (Independent), writer, poet
- Grigory Pavlov (DN)
- Sergey Sergeyev (Independent)
- Aleksandr Sorokin (Independent)
- Vasily Stepanov (Independent)
- Arseny Suvorov (Independent), businessman, 1993 candidate for this seat

==== Declined ====
- Svyatoslav Fyodorov (Nikolayev–Fyodorov Bloc), incumbent Member of State Duma (1996–present), leader of the Party of Workers' Self-Government (1995–present), 1996 presidential candidate (ran in the Sheremetyevo constituency)

==== Results ====
Summary of the 19 December 1999 Russian legislative election in the Cheboksary constituency
Candidate	Party	Votes	%
Anatoly Aksakov	Independent	116,729	40.41%
Igor Molyakov	Communist Party	84,990	29.42%
Oleg Nasakin	Liberal Democratic Party	17,285	5.98%
Valentin Malyutkin	Yabloko	12,536	4.34%
Vladimir Izhederov	Stalin Bloc – For the USSR	9,869	3.42%
Vakhtang Chkuaseli	Independent	6,491	2.25%
Vitaly Malinov	Movement in Support of the Army	4,131	1.43%
Vladimir Petrov	Independent	3,549	1.23%
Valery Mikhaylov	Independent	1,921	0.67%
Yury Metlov	Independent	833	0.29%
against all		22,585	7.82%
Total		288,849	100%

=== 2003 ===
==== Declared candidates ====
- Anatoly Aksakov (NPRF), incumbent Member of State Duma (2000–present)
- Sergey Drandrov (Independent), businessman
- Viktor Fyodorov (Independent), nonprofit chairman
- Yevgeny Lin (Yabloko), chairman of the party regional office
- Vladimir Mayorov (Independent), businessman, singer
- Igor Molyakov (CPRF), former Member of State Council of the Chuvash Republic (1994–1995, 1995–2003), 1993 and 1999 candidate for this seat
- Arina Ryzhova (ORP Rus'), auditor
- Valery Zhukov (PVR-RPZh), businessman

==== Withdrawn candidates ====
- Eduard Alekseyev (VR–ES), nonprofit chairman
- Lev Goncharenko (LDPR), Chuvash State Pedagogical University faculty of history dean
- Yevgeny Spiridonov (SPS), businessman

==== Did not file ====
- Nikolay Alyoshev (Independent), militsiya investigator
- Sergey Borisov (Independent), military prosecutor
- Robert Churkin (ORP Rus'), attorney (ran in the Kanash constituency)
- Vitaly Danilov (Independent), nonprofit executive
- Georgy Vasilyev (Independent), unemployed

==== Results ====
Summary of the 7 December 2003 Russian legislative election in the Cheboksary constituency
Candidate	Party	Votes	%
Anatoly Aksakov (incumbent)	People's Party	135,222	47.32%
Igor Molyakov	Communist Party	71,385	24.98%
Vladimir Mayorov	Independent	13,691	4.79%
Yevgeny Lin	Yabloko	7,275	2.55%
Arina Ryzhova	United Russian Party Rus'	7,142	2.50%
Viktor Fedorov	Independent	5,403	1.89%
Valery Zhukov	Party of Russia's Rebirth-Russian Party of Life	3,418	1.20%
Sergey Drandrov	Independent	3,368	1.18%
against all		31,390	10.99%
Total		285,917	100%

=== 2016 ===
==== Declared candidates ====
- Vladislav Arkadyev (Yabloko), human rights activist, 2015 head candidate
- Sergey Belobayev (LDPR), aide to State Duma member Vasily Zhurko
- Leonid Cherkesov (United Russia), Head of Cheboksary – Chairman of the City Assembly of Deputies (2010–present), Member of the Assembly of Deputies (2005–present)
- Aleksandr Golitsyn (GP), party financial director
- Mikhail Gorbatin (Party of Growth), businessman
- Andrey Kulagin (Patriots of Russia), Member of State Council of the Chuvash Republic (2006–present)
- Vladimir Mayorov (PARNAS), businessman, singer, 2003 candidate for this seat
- Oleg Nikolayev (The Greens), pensioner
- Oleg Nikolayev (A Just Russia), Member of State Council of the Chuvash Republic (2011–present)
- Oleg Nikolayev (Independent), driver
- Nina Ryleyeva (Rodina), bank teller
- Sergey Shulyatyev (CPCR), businessman, perennial candidate
- Valentin Shurchanov (CPRF), Member of State Duma (2000–2003, 2007–present), 1997, 2001 and 2015 head candidate

==== Failed to qualify ====
- Anastasia Ivanova (Independent), individual entrepreneur
- Valentin Sretensky (Independent), pensioner

==== Declined ====
- Irina Klementyeva (United Russia), Member of Cheboksary City Assembly of Deputies (2001–present), insurance businesswoman (lost the primary)

==== Results ====
Summary of the 18 September 2016 Russian legislative election in the Cheboksary constituency
Candidate	Party	Votes	%
Leonid Cherkesov	United Russia	125,456	46.77%
Oleg Nikolayev	A Just Russia	32,153	11.99%
Valentin Shurchanov	Communist Party	31,881	11.88%
Sergey Belobayev	Liberal Democratic Party	20,430	7.62%
Sergey Shulyatyev	Communists of Russia	8,058	3.00%
Oleg Nikolayev	The Greens	7,567	2.82%
Vladimir Mayorov	People's Freedom Party	5,204	1.94%
Oleg Nikolayev	Independent	4,938	1.84%
Vladislav Arkadyev	Yabloko	4,548	1.70%
Andrey Kulagin	Patriots of Russia	4,099	1.53%
Aleksandr Golitsyn	Civic Platform	3,497	1.30%
Mikhail Gorbatin	Party of Growth	3,439	1.28%
Nina Ryleyeva	Rodina	3,257	1.21%
Total		268,264	100%

=== 2021 ===
==== Declared candidates ====
- Vladimir Andreyev (CPCR), unemployed
- Vladislav Arkadyev (Yabloko), human rights activist, 2015 head candidate, 2016 candidate for this seat
- Igor Molyakov (A Just Russia), Member of State Duma (2020–present), 1993, 1999 and 2003 CPRF candidate for this seat
- Sergey Pavlov (Rodina), businessman
- Stanislav Pesin (RPPSS), lawyer
- Alla Salayeva (United Russia), Deputy Premier of Chuvashia – Minister of Education and Youth Policy (2020–present)
- Sergey Sorokin (GP), computer graphics school director
- Konstantin Stepanov (LDPR), Member of State Council of the Chuvash Republic (2016–present), 2020 head candidate
- Vladislav Tsapin (CPRF), security executive

==== Withdrawn candidates ====
- Oleg Baranov (New People), medical businessman

==== Failed to qualify ====
- Yelena Yevgenyeva (Independent), construction executive

==== Declined ====
- Leonid Cherkesov (United Russia), incumbent Member of State Duma (2016–present) (ran for the State Council of the Chuvash Republic)

==== Results ====
Summary of the 17–19 September 2021 Russian legislative election in the Cheboksary constituency
Candidate	Party	Votes	%
Alla Salayeva	United Russia	97,548	39.63%
Igor Molyakov	A Just Russia — For Truth	45,197	18.36%
Vladimir Andreyev	Communists of Russia	27,788	11.29%
Vladislav Tsapin	Communist Party	22,502	9.14%
Stanislav Pesin	Party of Pensioners	13,750	5.59%
Konstantin Stepanov	Liberal Democratic Party	13,596	5.52%
Sergey Pavlov	Rodina	5,934	2.41%
Sergey Sorokin	Civic Platform	4,957	2.01%
Vladislav Arkadyev	Yabloko	3,231	1.31%
Total		246,150	100%

=== 2026 ===
==== Declared candidates ====
- Aleksandr Filippov (CPRF), engineer
- Nikolay Kirgizov (New People), IT specialist
- Konstantin Konovalov (The Greens), businessman
- Alla Salayeva (United Russia), incumbent Member of State Duma (2021–present)
- Fyodor Stepanov (A Just Russia), Member of State Council of the Chuvash Republic (2025–present)
- Konstantin Stepanov (LDPR), Member of State Council of the Chuvash Republic (2017–present), 2020 and 2025 head candidate, 2021 candidate for this seat
- Natalya Voronkova (RPPSS), party activist

==== Withdrew after registration ====
- Vladislav Arkadyev (Yabloko), human rights activist, 2015 head candidate, 2016 and 2021 candidate for this seat (disqualified on September 10, 2026, for campaign financing violations)

==== Declined ====
- Andrey Petrov (United Russia), former acting Mayor of Cheboksary (2021) (lost the primary)
- Denis Spirin (United Russia), former Mayor of Cheboksary (2021–2024) (lost the primary)

==== Results ====
Summary of the 18-20 September 2026 Russian legislative election in the Cheboksary constituency
Candidate	Party	Votes	%
Alla Salayeva (incumbent)	United Russia	137,113	50.59%
Aleksandr Filippov	Communist Party	43,101	15.90%
Konstantin Stepanov	Liberal Democratic Party	26,950	9.94%
Nikolay Kirgizov	New People	19,573	7.22%
Fyodor Stepanov	A Just Russia	16,076	5.93%
Natalya Voronkova	Party of Pensioners	14,318	5.28%
Konstantin Konovalov	The Greens	6,208	2.29%
Total		271,010	100%
