= Administrative divisions of Chuvashia =

Administrative divisions of Russian federal subject

Chuvash Republic Russia
- Administrative centre: Cheboksary

Administrative structure (as of 2013)
- Districts: 21
- Cities/towns: 9
- Urban-type settlements: 7
- Selsovets and rural administrations: 351

Municipal structure (as of 2002)
- Rural settlements: 1,723 (inhabited); 14 (uninhabited)

Chuvashia is a federal subject of Russia.

== Administrative and municipal divisions ==
Map

Division		Structure		OKATO	OKTMO	Urban-type settlement/ island territory/district-level town*	Rural
Division		Administrative	Municipal	OKATO	OKTMO	Urban-type settlement/ island territory/district-level town*	Rural
Cheboksary (Чебоксары)		city	urban okrug	97 401	97 701		
↳	Kalininsky (Калининский)	(under Cheboksary)	—N/a	97 401	—N/a		
↳	Leninsky (Ленинский)	(under Cheboksary)	—N/a	97 401	—N/a	Novye Lapsary (Новые Лапсары)	
↳	Moskovsky (Московский)	(under Cheboksary)	—N/a	97 401	—N/a	Sosnovka (Сосновка)	1 selsovet
Alatyr (Алатырь)		city	urban okrug	97 404	97 704		
Kanash (Канаш)		city	urban okrug	97 407	97 707		
Novocheboksarsk (Новочебоксарск)		city	urban okrug	97 410	97 710		
Shumerlya (Шумерля)		district		97 413	97 713		
Alatyrsky (Алатырский)		district		97 203	97 603		21 rural administrations
Alikovsky (Аликовский)		district		97 205	97 605		20 rural administrations
Batyrevsky (Батыревский)		district		97 207	97 607		20 rural administrations
Vurnarsky (Вурнарский)		district		97 210	97 610	Vurnary (Вурнары)	28 rural administrations
Ibresinsky (Ибресинский)		district		97 213	97 613	Buinsk (Буинск); Ibresi (Ибреси)	11 selsovets
Kanashsky (Канашский)		district		97 216	97 616		27 rural administrations
Kozlovsky (Козловский)		district		97 219	97 619	Kozlovka (Козловка) town*	10 rural administrations
Komsomolsky (Комсомольский)		district		97 221	97 621		13 rural administrations
Krasnoarmeysky (Красноармейский)		district		97 224	97 624		13 selsovets
Krasnochetaysky (Красночетайский)		district		97 226	97 626		11 rural administrations
Mariinsko-Posadsky (Мариинско-Посадский)		district		97 229	97 629	Mariinsky Posad (Мариинский Посад) town*	13 rural administrations
Morgaushsky (Моргаушский)		district		97 232	97 632		19 selsovets
Poretsky (Порецкий)		district		97 235	97 635		16 rural administrations
Urmarsky (Урмарский)		district		97 238	97 638	Urmary (Урмары)	17 selsovets
Tsivilsky (Цивильский)		district		97 241	97 641	Tsivilsk (Цивильск) town*	20 selsovets
Cheboksarsky (Чебоксарский)		district		97 244	97 644	Kugesi (Кугеси)	22 selsovets
Shemurshinsky (Шемуршинский)		district		97 247	97 647		14 rural administrations
Shumerlinsky (Шумерлинский)		district		97 250	97 650		13 selsovets
Yadrinsky (Ядринский)		district		97 253	97 653	Yadrin (Ядрин) town*	20 selsovets
Yalchiksky (Яльчикский)		district		97 255	97 655		12 rural administrations
Yantikovsky (Янтиковский)		district		97 258	97 658		10 rural administrations
