= Anatoly Aksakov =

Russian politician and economist

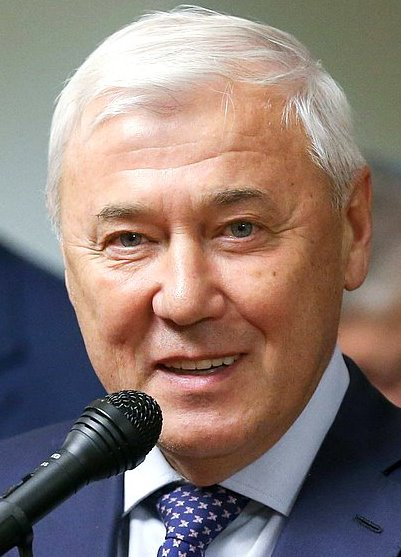

Chairman of the State Duma committee on financial market
- Incumbent
- Assumed office 5 October 2016
- Preceded by: Nikolay Gonchar

Deputy of the State Duma Russia
- Incumbent
- Assumed office 18 January 2000
- Preceded by: Constituency Re-established
- Constituency: Kanash (No. 37); Cheboksary (No. 38); Party List

Chairman of the State Duma committee on innovative development and entrepreneurship
- In office 21 April 2015 – 5 October 2016
- Preceded by: Igor Rudensky
- Succeeded by: Sergey Zhigarev

Personal details
- Born: 27 October 1957 (age 68) Yermolayevo, Kuyurgazinsky District, Bashkir ASSR
- Party: A Just Russia
- Occupation: Politician

Anatoly Gennadyevich Aksakov (Russian: Анато́лий Генна́дьевич Акса́ков; born 28 November 1957) is a Russian politician and economist. Chairman of the State Duma Russia committee on financial market from 5 October 2016.

He is a deputy of the Russian State Duma from the A Just Russia party.

== Early life and career ==
After graduating from secondary school in 1975, Aksakov began studies at Moscow State University in the Economics Department in 1977. After graduating in 1983 as a qualified economist, Aksakov served as a Deputy in the State Council of the Chuvash Republic. In 1986 he completed post-graduate studies in economics at Moscow State University.

From 1986 Aksakov was a lecturer at Chuvash State University as a docent in Economic Theory and Market Economics, and from 1994—1997 he was deputy director of the Institute of Economics, Finance and Law in Cheboksary, whilst also holding the position of Director of the Cheboksary branches of the Moscow Commercial Bank from 1995—1997.

== Political career ==
From 1997—2000, Aksakov was Deputy Chairman of the Cabinet and Minister of Economic Affairs of the Chuvash Republic.

In the 1999 State Duma elections, he was elected as a Deputy in the State Duma of the Russian Federation for the Cheboksary constituency, and became Deputy Chairman of the Committee on Economic Policy and Entrepreneurship. In the 2005 State Duma elections, Aksakov was re-elected for the same district as a member of United Russia.

In 2005, Aksakov graduated from the Diplomatic Academy of the Ministry of Foreign Affairs of the Russian Federation as a specialist in the field of international relations.

In the 2007 State Duma elections, he was re-elected as a member of the federal list of A Just Russia.

Aksakov is a member of the National Banking Council of Central Bank of Russia and is a member of the board of the Russian Union of Industrialists and Entrepreneurs.

== Awards ==
- Order “For Merit to the Fatherland”, 4th Class
- Medals of the Order “For Merit to the Fatherland”, 1st and 2nd Class
- Certificate of Honour of the President of the Russian Federation — for contributions to state-building, the development of budget and tax legislation, and active public and political engagement
- Certificate of Honour and Badge of Honour of the State Duma of the Russian Federation — for a significant contribution to the development of legislation and parliamentarism
- Commendations from the Chairman of the Government of the Russian Federation, the Minister of Finance of the Russian Federation, and the Director of the Federal Security Service (FSB)

=== Sanctions ===
Due to the violation of Ukraine’s territorial integrity and independence during the Russo-Ukrainian war, he is subject to personal international sanctions imposed by various countries.

On February 23, 2022, he was included in the European Union’s sanctions list for actions and policies that undermine the territorial integrity, sovereignty, and independence of Ukraine and further destabilize the country.

On February 24, 2022, he was added to Canada’s sanctions list of “close associates of the regime” for voting in favor of recognizing the independence of the “so-called republics in Donetsk and Luhansk”.

On March 24, 2022, amid Russia’s invasion of Ukraine, he was added to the U.S. sanctions list for “complicity in Putin’s war” and “supporting the Kremlin’s efforts to invade Ukraine”. The U.S. Department of State stated that State Duma deputies use their powers to persecute dissenters and political opponents, violate freedom of information, and restrict the human rights and fundamental freedoms of Russian citizens.

Since February 25, 2022, he has been under sanctions by Switzerland.

Since February 26, 2022 — under sanctions by Australia.

Since March 18, 2022 — under sanctions by New Zealand.

Since March 24, 2022 — under sanctions by the United States.

Since April 12, 2022 — under personal sanctions by Japan.

By decree of Ukrainian president Volodymyr Zelenskyy, he has been under Ukrainian sanctions since September 7, 2022.

== Family and personal life ==
A. G. Aksakov’s parents are buried in Crimea.

He is married to Tatyana Alexandrovna Petrova, the daughter of A. P. Petrov, former head of the Chuvash ASSR and Chairman of the Presidium of the Supreme Soviet of the Chuvash ASSR.

Children: Dmitry and Alexander, both graduates of the Higher School of Economics. For some time, they lived in the United States. As of 2024, Aksakov’s sons hold senior positions in state financial institutions: Dmitry is head of ESG banking at VEB.RF, and Alexander heads a division at DOM.RF JSC.

He usually spends his vacations in Crimea, where he owns a house and a garden near the sea.
