= List of chairpersons of the State Council of the Chuvash Republic =

List of chairpersons of the State Council of the Chuvash Republic. The State Council was preceded by the Supreme Soviet.

== List ==
=== Chairmen of the Supreme Soviet 1938–1994 ===
	Name	Period
1st convocation	Nikolai Pavlov	26 July 1938 – 17 March 1947
2nd/3rd convocation	Saed Islyukov	17 March 1947 – 21 April 1955
4th convocation	Vasily Yakovlev	21 April 1955 – 20 March 1959
5th convocation	Leonid Mikhailov	20 March 1959 – 25 March 1963
6th convocation	Ilya Prokopiev	25 March 1963 – 24 March 1967
7th convocation	Mikhail Sirotkin	24 March 1967 – 29 June 1971
8th convocation	Anatoly Markov	29 June 1971 – 2 July 1975
9th convocation	Alexander Petrov	2 July 1975 – 21 March 1985
10th convocation	Demian Semenov	21 March 1985 – 25 April 1990
11th convocation	Anatoly Leontiev	25 April 1990 – 28 August 1991
12th convocation	Edouard Kubarev	29 August 1991 – 4 May 1994

=== Chairpersons of the State Council 1994 – present ===
	Name	Period
1st convocation	Valentin Shurchanov	22 June 1994 – July 1998
2nd convocation	Lev Kurakov	July 1998 – February 2000
2nd convocation	Nikolai Ivanov	14 February 2000 – April 2001
2nd convocation	Mikhail Mikhailovsky	17 April 2001 – July 2002
3rd Convocation	Mikhail Mikhailovsky	26 July, 2002–2006
4th convocation	Mikhail Mikhailovsky	19 October 2006 – 22 November 2011
5th convocation	Yury Popov	15 December 2011 – 2016
6th convocation	Valery Filimonov	29 September 2016 – 2019
6th convocation	Albina Egorova	12 February 2019 – present

== Sources ==
- Official website
