= Morgaushi =

Rural locality in Chuvashia, Russia

Coordinates: 55°58′10″N 46°45′58″E

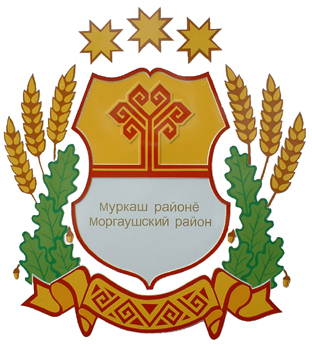
Coat of arms of Morgaushi

Morgaushi (Russian: Моргауши, Chuvash: Муркаш, Murkaş) is a rural locality (a selo) and the administrative center of Morgaushsky District of the Chuvash Republic, Russia. Population: 3,263 (2010 census); 2,950 (2002 census); 2,893 (1989 Soviet census).
