= Krasnoarmeyskoye, Chuvash Republic =

Rural locality in Chuvashia, Russia

Coordinates: 55°46′15″N 47°10′20″E

Krasnoarmeyskoye (Russian: Красноармейское, Chuvash: Красноармейски, Krasnoarmeyski) is a rural locality (a selo) and the administrative center of Krasnoarmeysky District of the Chuvash Republic, Russia. Population: 4,271 (2010 census); 4,337 (2002 census); 4,345 (1989 Soviet census).
