= Krasnoarmeysky District, Chuvash Republic =

Krasnoarmeysky District Красноармейский район (Russian)
- District

Other transcription(s)
  - Chuvash: Красноармейски районӗ
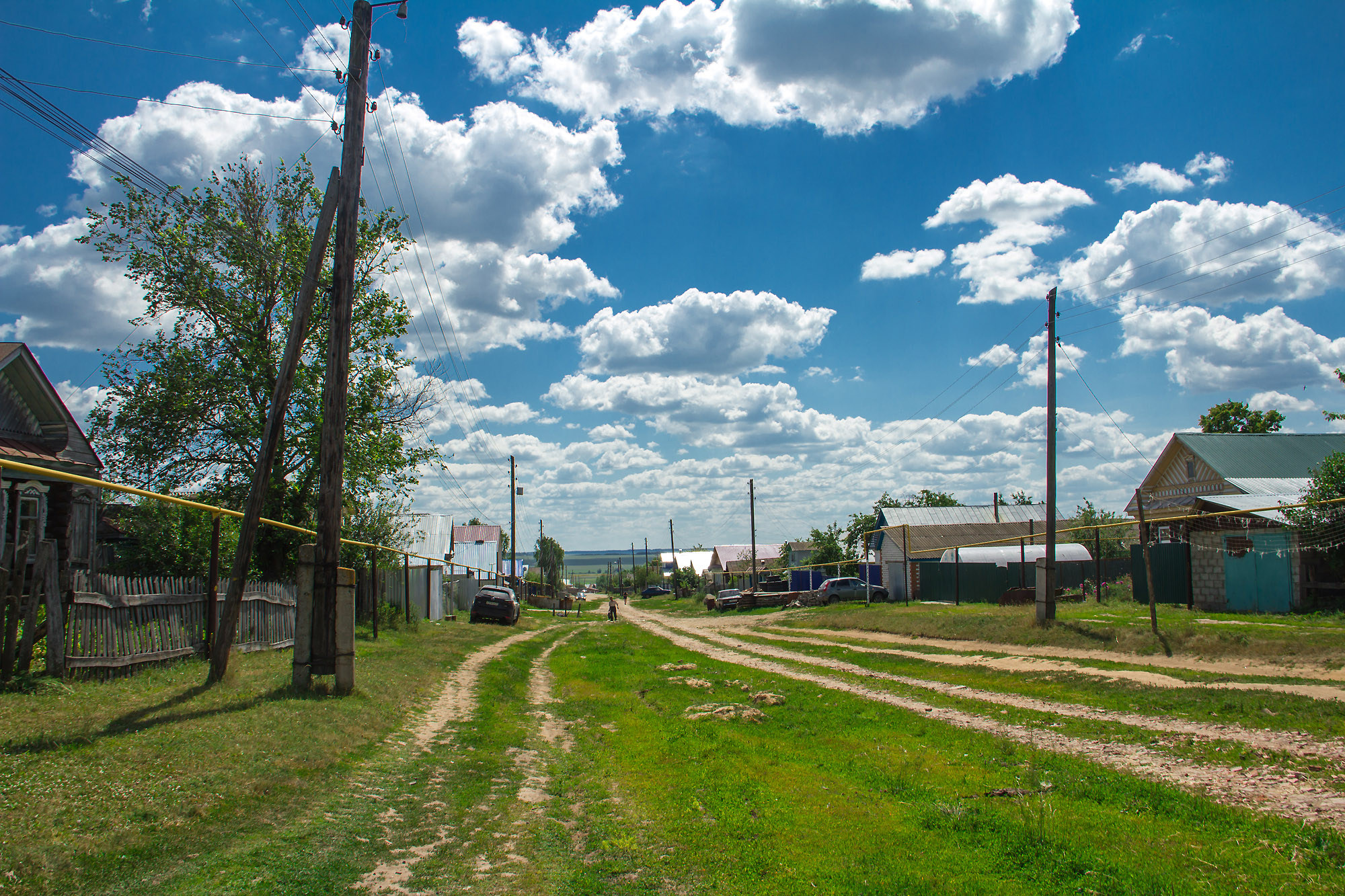
- Yanmurzino Village, Krasnoarmeysky District, Chuvashia

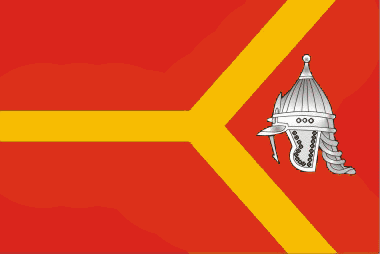
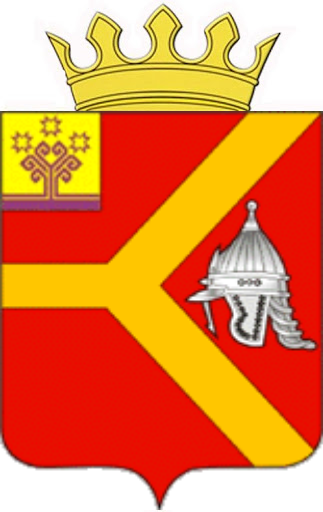
- Flag Coat of arms
- Location of Krasnoarmeysky District in the Chuvash Republic
- Coordinates: 55°46′02″N 47°10′11″E
- Country: Russia
- Federal subject: Chuvash Republic
- Established: January 9, 1935
- Administrative center: Krasnoarmeyskoye

Area
  - Total: 456.3 km^{2} (176.2 sq mi)

Population (2010 Census)
  - Total: 16,036
  - Density: 35.14/km^{2} (91.02/sq mi)
  - Urban: 0%
  - Rural: 100%

Administrative structure
  - Administrative divisions: 9 rural settlement
  - Inhabited localities: 89 rural localities

Municipal structure
  - Municipally incorporated as: Krasnoarmeysky Municipal District
  - Municipal divisions: 0 urban settlements, 9 rural settlements
- Time zone: UTC+3 (MSK)
- OKTMO ID: 97624000
- Website: http://gov.cap.ru/main.asp?govid=67

Krasnoarmeysky District (Russian: Красноарме́йский райо́н; Chuvash: Красноармейски районӗ, Krasnoarmeyski rayonĕ) is an administrative and municipal district (raion), one of the twenty-one in the Chuvash Republic, Russia. It is located in the north of the republic and borders with Cheboksarsky District in the north, Tsivilsky District in the northeast, Kanashsky and Vurnarsky Districts in the south, and with Alikovsky and Morgaushsky Districts in the west. The area of the district is 456.3 square kilometers (176.2 sq mi). Its administrative center is the rural locality (a selo) of Krasnoarmeyskoye. Population: 16,036 (2010 census); 17,940 (2002 census); 19,693 (1989 Soviet census). The population of Krasnoarmeyskoye accounts for 26.6% of the district's total population.

== History ==
The district was established on January 9, 1935.
