= Mišši Juhma =

Mikhail Nikolayevich Yukhma
- Born: Михаил Николаевич Ильин; 10 April 1936 (age 90); Săkăt, Batyrevsky District, Chuvash ASSR, USSR
- Occupations: novelist, poet
- Writing career
- Pen name: Mishshi Yukhma
- Language: Chuvash, Russian

Mikhail Nikolayevich Yukhma (Russian: Михаил Николаевич Юхма; born 10 April 1936), better known by his pen name Mishshi Yukhma (Chuvash: Юхма Мишши, Yuhma Mişşi), is a Chuvash novelist, poet, and folklorist.

== Biography ==
Mishshi Yukhma was born on 10 April 1936 in Săkăt, Batyrevsky District, Chuvashia. He graduated from the Chuvash State Pedagogical University. He has worked as a researcher in Chuvash Republican Museum of Local Lore. He also headed a Chuvash book publishing house.

== Creative activity ==
Yukhma is known as the author of many historical novels and novellas, collections of legends and short stories, essays, dramatic and poetic books; studies on ancient and medieval history, as well as on folklore and mythology of the Chuvash people.

Besides in Russian and Chuvash, his works have been published in other languages of the Soviet Union, as well as in other languages outside the USSR. Yukhma also works in the genre of drama. About thirty of his plays have been staged on the stages of theaters in a number of countries (Azerbaijan, Lithuania, Ukraine, Kazakhstan, Austria, Korea, etc.), such as "On the Night of the Full Moon", "Foundation", "Feathers of the White Swan", "Straw Boy", "Dough-Hero", "Husband and Wife — One Satan", "How to Get to Heaven", and "Tears of the Gods". Based on his works, operas and ballets were created, which were staged on the stages of a large number of theaters. The words of Mishsha Yukhma are composed of many songs that are sung to this day.

== Literature ==
- Арустамян Э. С. Михаил Юхма (Миши Юхма) – Всё отдаю людям : Размышления и философские обобщения о жизни и творчестве. – М. : ООО "РиоМакс", 2006. – 319 с.
- "Чӑваш литературин антологийӗ", составители: Д. В. Гордеев, Ю. А. Силэм. Чебоксары, 2003. ISBN 5-7670-1279-2 .
