= Alla Salayeva =

Russian politician

- Алла Салаева
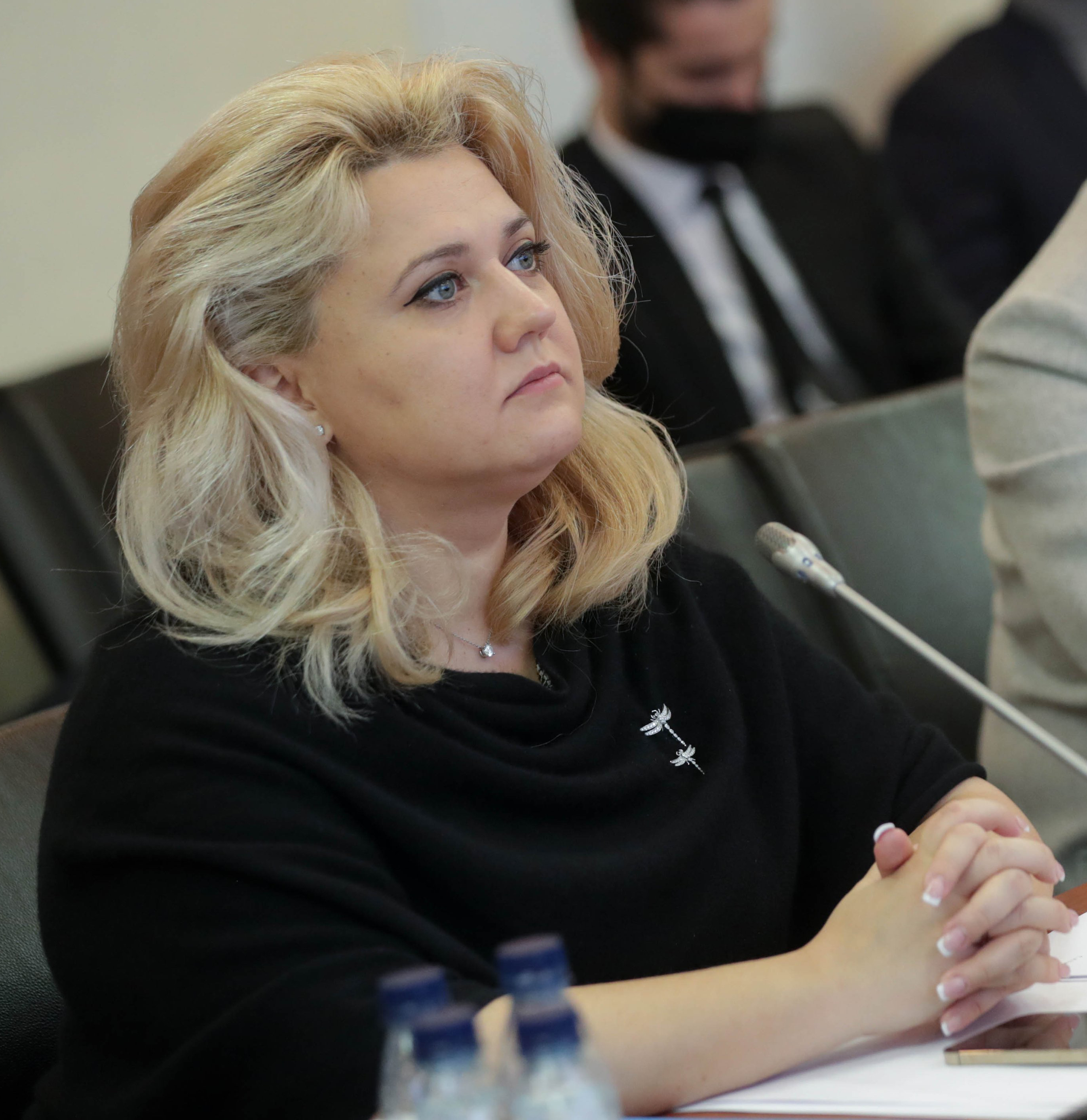

Member of the State Duma for Chuvashia
- Incumbent
- Assumed office 12 October 2021
- Preceded by: Leonid Cherkesov
- Constituency: Cheboksary (No. 38)

Personal details
- Born: 14 September 1979 (age 47) Cheboksary, Chuvash ASSR, Russian SFSR, USSR
- Party: United Russia
- Spouse: Dmitry Razvin (divorced)
- Children: Ivan Razvin
- Parent(s): Leonid Salaev; Tatyana Salaeva
- Education: Chuvash State University; RANEPA
- Occupation: Historian

Alla Leonidovna Salaeva (Russian: Алла Леонидовна Салаева; born 14 September 1979) is a Russian political figure and deputy of the 8th State Duma. From 2003 to 2012, Salaeva worked at the department of culture at the Cheboksary city administration. From 2012 to 2020, she was the vice-president of social affairs. On 23 September 2020, Salaeva was appointed acting head of the Ministry of Education of the Chuvashia. On 9 November 2020, she became the vice-president of the Republic's Ministry of Education and Youth Policy. Since September 2021, she has served as deputy of the 8th State Duma.

== Sanctions ==
She was sanctioned by the UK government in 2022 in relation to the Russo-Ukrainian War.
