= Sosnovka, Cheboksary, Chuvash Republic =

Urban locality in Cheboksary, Republic of Chuvashia, Russia

Sosnovka Сосновка
- Work settlement

Other transcription(s)
  - Chuvash: Сосновка
- Interactive map of Sosnovka
- Location of Sosnovka Sosnovka (Chuvash Republic)
- Coordinates: 56°11′21″N 47°13′40″E
- Country: Russia
- Federal subject: Chuvashia

Population (2010 Census)
  - Total: 2,242
  - Estimate (1989): 4,876 (+117.5%)

Administrative status
  - Subordinated to: town of krai significance of Cheboksary

Municipal status
  - Urban okrug: Cheboksary Urban Okrug
- Time zone: UTC+3 (MSK)
- Postal code: 428902
- OKTMO ID: 97701000061

Sosnovka (Russian: Сосновка, Chuvash: Сосновка) is an urban locality (urban-type settlement) under the administrative jurisdiction of Moskovsky City District of the town of republican significance of Cheboksary, the Republic of Chuvashia, Russia. Population: 2,242 (2010 census); 3,053 (2002 census); 4,876 (1989 Soviet census).
