= Valentin Shurchanov =

Russian politician (1947–2020)

- Валентин Шурчанов
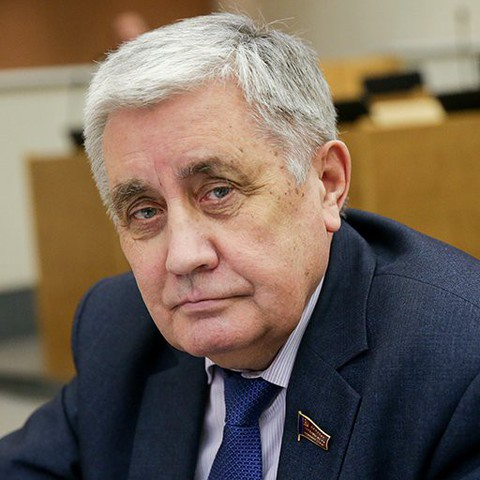

Member of the State Duma
- In office 1999 – 2003, 2007 – 2020
- Parliamentary group: CPRF

Chairman of the State Council of Chuvashia
- In office 1994–1998
- Preceded by: Position established
- Succeeded by: Lev Kurakov

Personal details
- Born: 19 April 1947 Starye Shaltyamy, Kanashsky District, Chuvash ASSR, RSFSR, Soviet Union
- Died: 18 December 2020 (aged 73) Moscow, Russia

Valentin Sergeyevich Shurchanov (Russian: Валентин Сергеевич Шурчанов; 19 April 1947 – 18 December 2020) was a Russian politician and journalist. He was born in Kanashsky District, Soviet Union. From 1999 to 2003 and again from 2007 until his death, Shurchanov was a member of the State Duma. He was a member of the Communist Party.

Valentin Shurchanov was Communist candidate for presidency of Chuvashia in 1997, 2001 and 2015. From 2005 to 2009 he was editor-in-chief of Pravda.

Shurchanov died from COVID-19 on 18 December 2020, in Moscow during the COVID-19 pandemic in Russia. He was 73.

== See also ==
- List of members of the State Duma of Russia who died in office
