= Yermolayevo =

Yermolayevo (Russian: Ермолаево) is the name of several rural localities in Russia:

- Yermolayevo, Republic of Bashkortostan, a selo in Yermolayevsky Selsoviet of Kuyurgazinsky District in the Republic of Bashkortostan
- Yermolayevo, Beryozovsky District, Krasnoyarsk Krai, a village in Yesaulsky Selsoviet of Beryozovsky District in Krasnoyarsk Krai
- Yermolayevo, Shushensky District, Krasnoyarsk Krai, a village in Ilyichevsky Selsoviet of Shushensky District in Krasnoyarsk Krai
- Yermolayevo, Oryol Oblast, a village in Bolshekulikovsky Selsoviet of Orlovsky District in Oryol Oblast
- Yermolayevo, Udmurt Republic, a selo in Yermolayevsky Selsoviet of Kiyasovsky District in the Udmurt Republic
