= Cheboksarsky District =

Cheboksarsky District Чебоксарский район (Russian)
- District

Other transcription(s)
  - Chuvash: Шупашкар районӗ
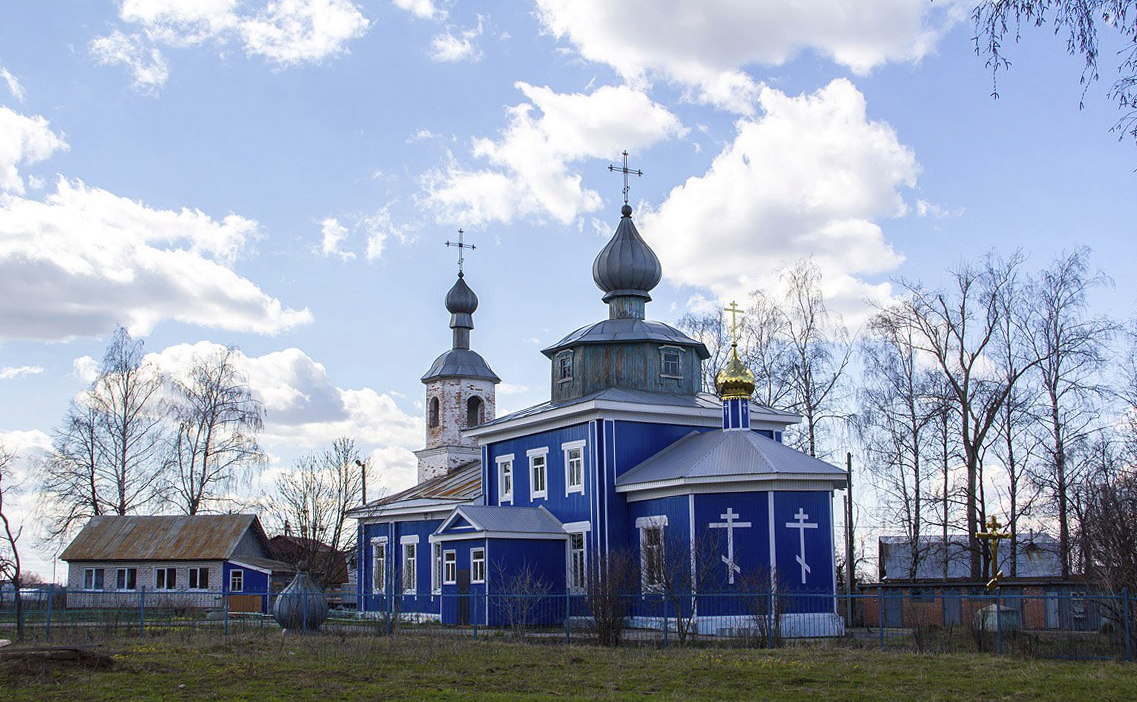
- Church of the Nativity of Christ, Cheboksarsky District

- Flag Coat of arms
- Location of Cheboksarsky District in the Chuvash Republic
- Coordinates: 56.093°N 46.970°E
- Country: Russia
- Federal subject: Chuvash Republic
- Established: September 5, 1927
- Administrative center: Kugesi

Area
  - Total: 1,178.8 km^{2} (455.1 sq mi)

Population (2010 Census)
  - Total: 62,920
  - Density: 53.38/km^{2} (138.2/sq mi)
  - Urban: 18.9%
  - Rural: 81.1%

Administrative structure
  - Administrative divisions: 17 rural settlement
  - Inhabited localities: 1 urban-type settlements, 171 rural localities

Municipal structure
  - Municipally incorporated as: Cheboksarsky Municipal District
  - Municipal divisions: 0 urban settlements, 17 rural settlements
- Time zone: UTC+3 (MSK)
- OKTMO ID: 97544000
- Website: http://gov.cap.ru/main.asp?govid=93

Cheboksarsky District (Russian: Чебокса́рский райо́н; Chuvash: Шупашкар районӗ, Şupaşkar rayonĕ) is an administrative and municipal district (raion), one of the twenty-one in the Chuvash Republic, Russia. It is located in the north of the republic and borders with the Mari El Republic in the north, Mariinsko-Posadsky District in the east, Tsivilsky and Krasnoarmeysky Districts in the south, and with Morgaushsky District in the west. The area of the district is 1,178.8 square kilometers (455.1 sq mi). Its administrative center is the urban locality (an urban-type settlement) of Kugesi. Population: 62,920 (2010 census); 58,766 (2002 census); 57,107 (1989 Soviet census).

== Geography ==
The Volga River parts the district into a smaller area in the north and a larger southern area which contains the majority of the population.

== History ==
The district was established on September 5, 1927.

== Notable residents ==
- Hyacinth (born Nikita Bichurin; 1777–1853), one of the founding fathers of Russian Sinology
- Mikhail Ignatyev (1962–2020), politician
