= Kanash =

Town in the Chuvash Republic, Russia

Kanash Канаш
- Town

Other transcription(s)
  - Chuvash: Канаш
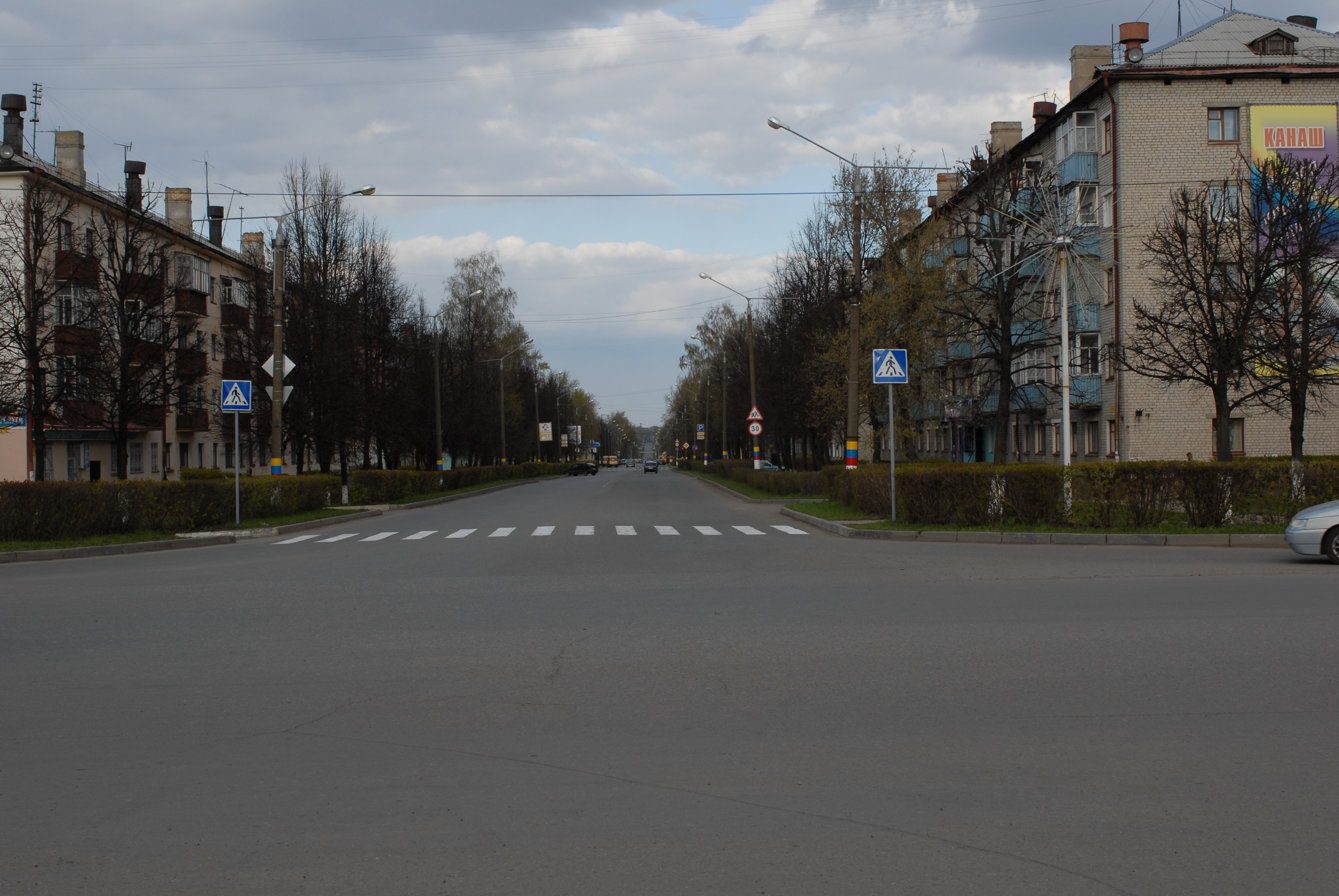
- Lenina Avenue in Kanash

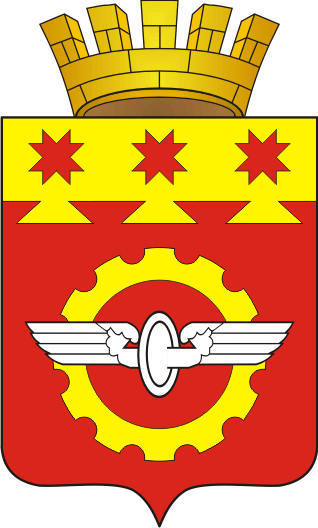
- Flag Coat of arms
- Interactive map of Kanash
- Location of Kanash Kanash (Chuvash Republic)
- Coordinates: 55°30′25″N 47°29′29″E
- Country: Russia
- Federal subject: Chuvashia
- Founded: 1891
- Town status since: 1925

Government
  - Head: Lyudmila Ivanova
- Elevation: 190 m (620 ft)

Population (2010 Census)
  - Total: 45,607
  - Estimate (2025): 43,035 (−5.6%)

Administrative status
  - Subordinated to: Town of Kanash
  - Capital of: Town of Kanash, Kanashsky District

Municipal status
  - Urban okrug: Kanash Urban Okrug
  - Capital of: Kanash Urban Okrug, Kanashsky Municipal District
- Time zone: UTC+3 (MSK)
- Postal codes: 429330, 429332–429337, 429340, 429349
- OKTMO ID: 97707000001
- Website: gov.cap.ru/main.asp?govid=61

Kanash (Russian: Кана́ш; Chuvash: Канаш, Kanaş, lit. soviet) is a town in the Chuvash Republic, Russia, located at a major railway junction 76 kilometers (47 mi) from Cheboksary, the capital of the republic. Population: 45,607 (2010 census); 50,593 (2002 census); 54,585 (1989 Soviet census).

== History ==
It was founded in 1891. Between 1891 and 1925 it was called Shikhrany (Шихраны).

The town's history is closely linked to the development of the railway. The Moscow–Kazan line was completed, except for the Imperatorsky Romanovsky railway bridge across Volga, in December 1884 by private Moscow Ryazan Railway Company which was renamed to Moscow Kazan Railway Company on July 11, 1891, which provided all train service in the area up to 1918, when all the remaining private railways were nationalized by the Bolsheviks.

The opening of the station, which was then surrounded by woodland, provided a convenient production point for the timber industry, and windmills were built in the area. In 1911, there were more than forty trading firms in Shikhrany. In 1912, a primary school was opened, and in 1914—a middle school. In 1919, Shikhrany station became a railway junction, when the Arzamas–Shikhrany line, which had been under construction from 1914, when the last section was completed from the Tsarkli River bridge to Shihrany, and opened to full traffic. The line had been in restricted use with limited car loads since summer 1917.

By 1925, when Kanash was granted town status, its population was approximately 2,200.

Another station was built in 1926 for goods transit. The first power station, which supplied electricity to the railway station, portions of the town, and thirteen nearby villages, was constructed in 1929.

Construction of the Kanash–Cheboksary line began in 1939, bringing the number of lines connecting Kanash up to four.

During World War II, railway production facilities and transit capacity were substantially increased.

From the 1950s to the 1970s, local industry was diversified. Factories producing furniture, tools, polymers, and plastics, and car repair factories were built.

== Administrative and municipal status ==
Within the framework of administrative divisions, Kanash serves as the administrative center of Kanashsky District, even though it is not a part of it. As an administrative division, it is incorporated separately as the town of republic significance of Kanash—an administrative unit with the status equal to that of the districts. As a municipal division, the town of republic significance of Kanash is incorporated as Kanash Urban Okrug.

== Notable residents ==
- Alexandra Boltasseva (born 1978), professor of electrical and computer engineering
- Nadezhda Wijenberg (born 1964), long-distance runner
- Viatcheslav Mukhanov (born 1956), theoretical physicist and cosmologist
