= Novye Lapsary =

Novye Lapsary Новые Лапсары
- Work settlement

Other transcription(s)
  - Chuvash: Çĕнĕ Лапсар
- Interactive map of Novye Lapsary
- Location of Novye Lapsary Novye Lapsary (Chuvash Republic)
- Coordinates: 56°04′10″N 47°12′57″E
- Country: Russia
- Federal subject: Chuvashia
- Founded: 1970

Population (2010 Census)
  - Total: 6,955
  - Estimate (2021): 5,913 (−15%)

Administrative status
  - Subordinated to: town of krai significance of Cheboksary

Municipal status
  - Urban okrug: Cheboksary Urban Okrug
- Time zone: UTC+3 (MSK)
- Postal code: 428903
- OKTMO ID: 97701000056

Novye Lapsary (Russian: Новые Лапсары, Chuvash: Çĕнĕ Лапсар, Śĕnĕ Lapsar) is an urban locality (urban-type settlement) under the administrative jurisdiction of Leninsky City District of the town of republican significance of Cheboksary, the Chuvash Republic, Russia. Population: 6,955 (2010 census); 7,655 (2002 census); 5,691 (1989 Soviet census).
