= Batyrevo, Chuvash Republic =

Rural locality in Chuvashia, Russia

Coordinates: 55°04′04″N 47°36′27″E

Batyrevo (Russian: Батырево, Chuvash: Патăрьел, Patăryel) is a rural locality (a selo) and the administrative center of Batyrevsky District of the Chuvash Republic, Russia. Population: 5,431 (2010 census); 5,702 (2002 census); 5,664 (1989 Soviet census).
