= Shumerlinsky District =

Shumerlinsky District Шумерлинский район (Russian)
- District

Other transcription(s)
  - Chuvash: Ҫӗмӗрле районӗ
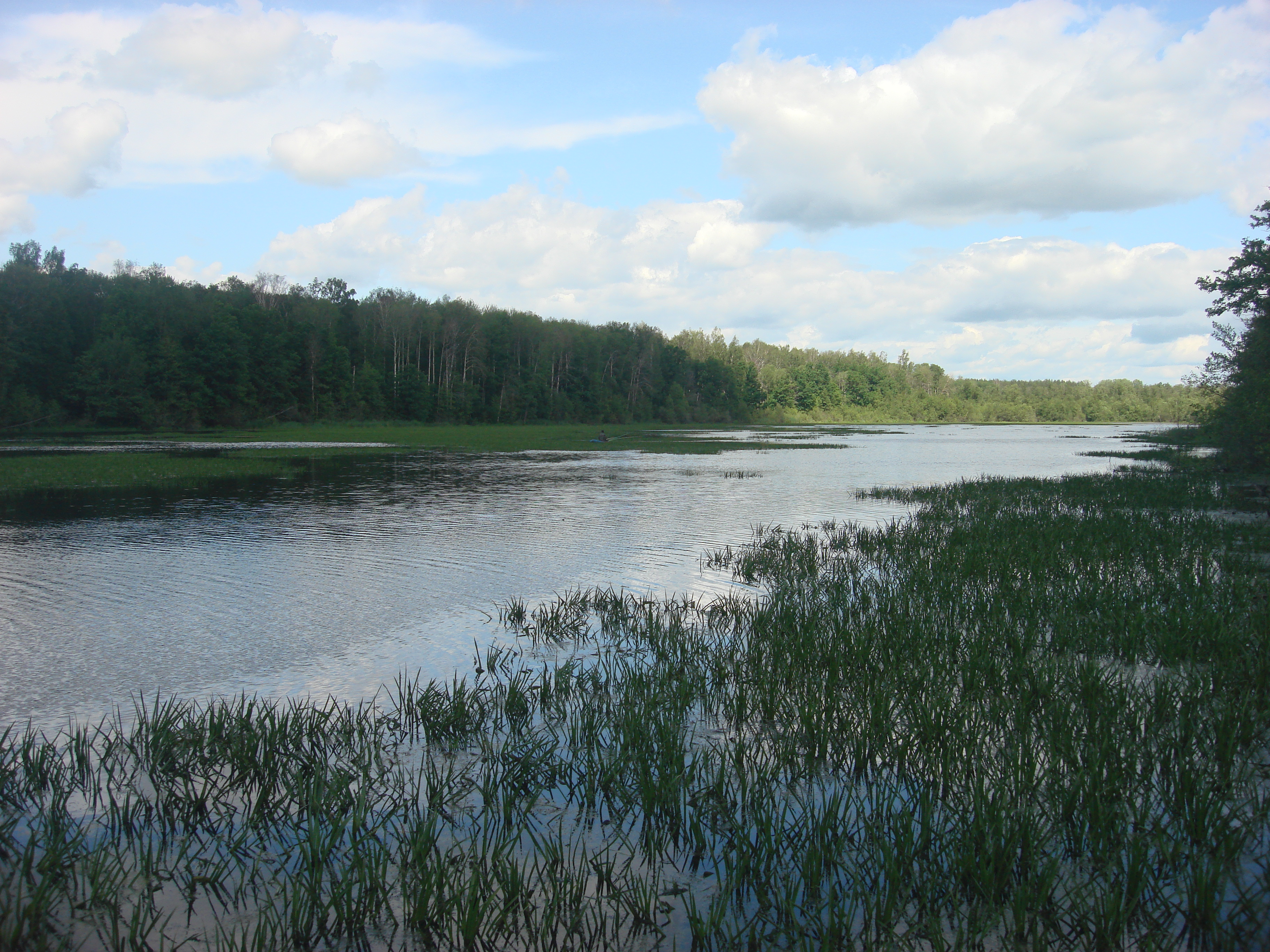
- Kumashkynskyy reserve, Shumerlinsky District

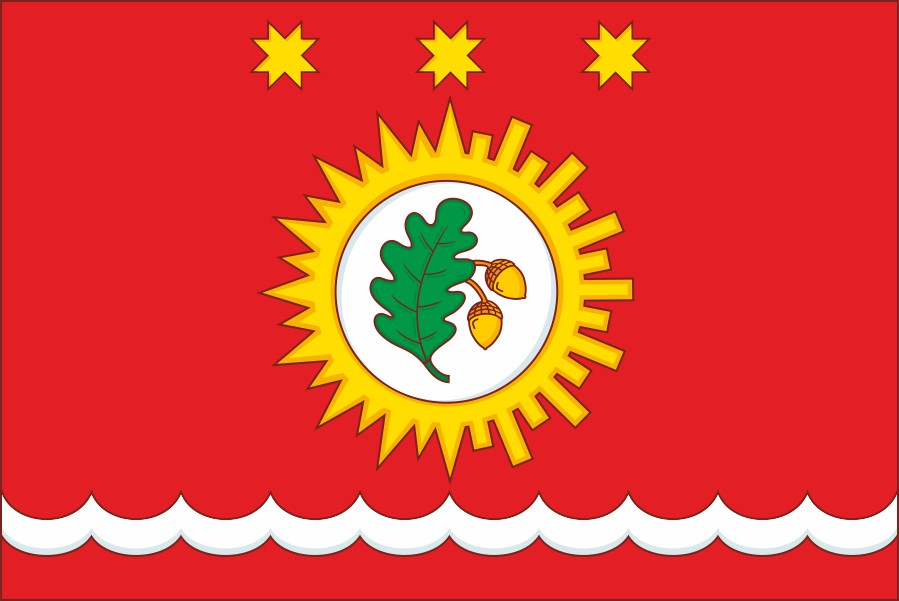
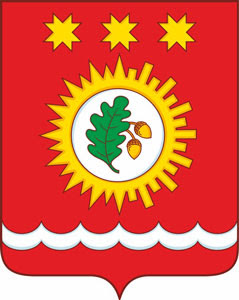
- Flag Coat of arms
- Location of Shumerlinsky District in the Chuvash Republic
- Coordinates: 55.5333°N 46.4167°E
- Country: Russia
- Federal subject: Chuvash Republic
- Established: January 9, 1935
- Administrative center: Shumerlya

Area
  - Total: 1,047.6 km^{2} (404.5 sq mi)

Population (2010 Census)
  - Total: 10,765
  - Density: 10.276/km^{2} (26.614/sq mi)
  - Urban: 0%
  - Rural: 100%

Administrative structure
  - Administrative divisions: 11 rural settlement
  - Inhabited localities----MUNICIPAL STATUS----: 57 rural localities

Municipal structure
  - Municipally incorporated as: Shumerlinsky Municipal District
  - Municipal divisions: 0 urban settlements, 11 rural settlements
- Website: http://gov.cap.ru/main.asp?govid=77

Shumerlinsky District (Russian: Шу́мерлинский райо́н; Chuvash: Ҫӗмӗрле районӗ, Śĕmĕrle rayonĕ) is an administrative and municipal district (raion), one of the twenty-one in the Chuvash Republic, Russia. It is located in the west of the republic and borders with Alikovsky and Krasnochetaysky Districts in the north, Vurnarsky District in the east, Ibresinsky and Poretsky Districts in the south, and with Nizhny Novgorod Oblast on the Sura River in the west. The area of the district is 1,047.6 square kilometers (404.5 sq mi). Its administrative center is the town of Shumerlya (which is not administratively a part of the district). Population: 10,765 (2010 census); 13,298 (2002 Census); 16,187 (1989 Soviet census).

== History ==
The district was formed on January 9, 1935.

== Administrative and municipal status ==
Within the framework of administrative divisions, Shumerlinsky District is one of the twenty-one in the republic. The town of Shumerlya serves as its administrative center, despite being incorporated separately as a town of republic significance—an administrative unit with the status equal to that of the districts.

As a municipal division, the district is incorporated as Shumerlinsky Municipal District. The town of republic significance of Shumerlya is incorporated separately from the district as Shumerlya Urban Okrug.

== Notable residents ==
- Valery Yardy (1948–1994), Olympic road cyclist
