= Batyrevsky District =

Batyrevsky District Батыревский район (Russian)
- District

Other transcription(s)
  - Chuvash: Патăрьел районӗ
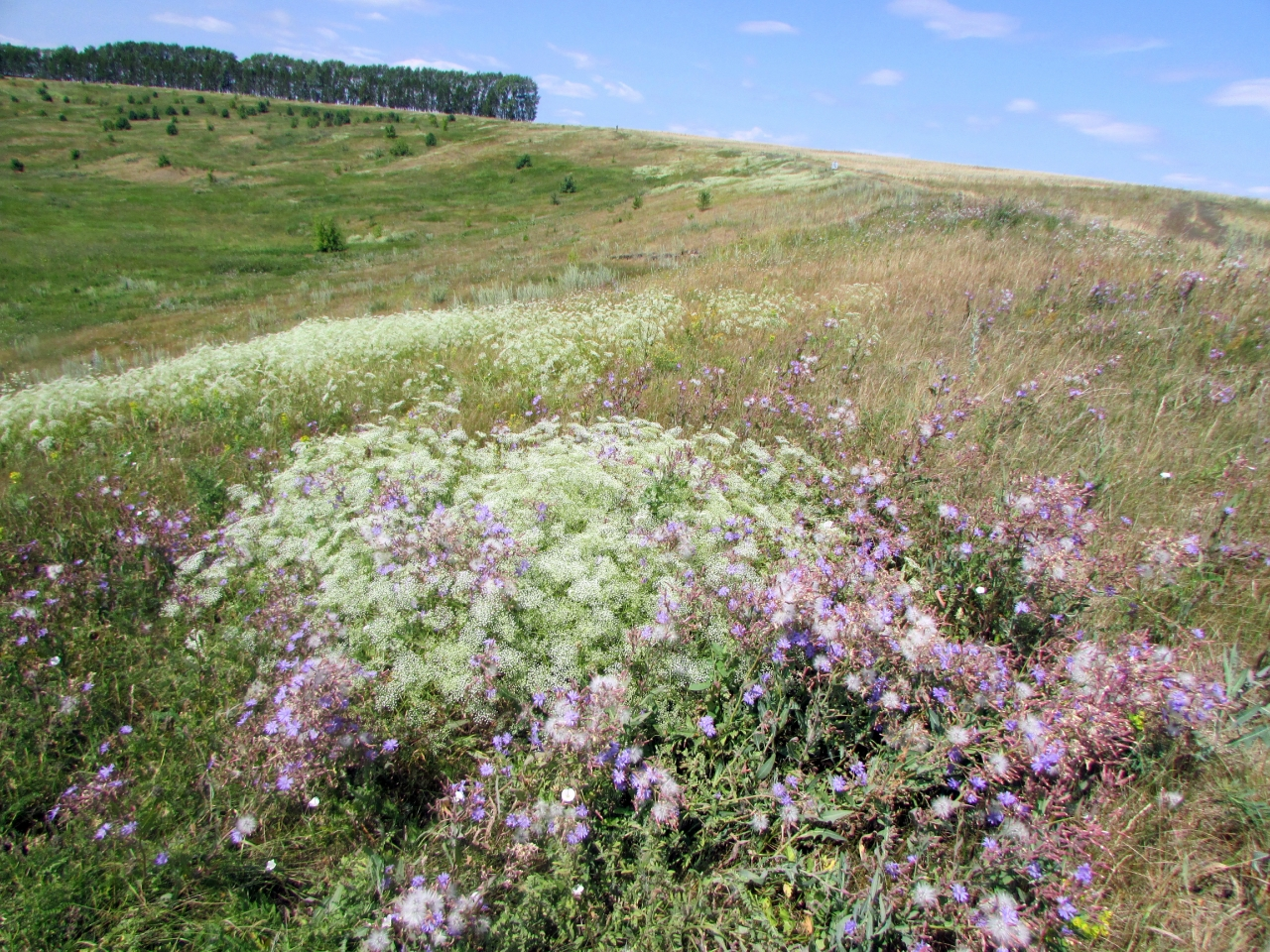
- Nature reserve in Batyrevsky District

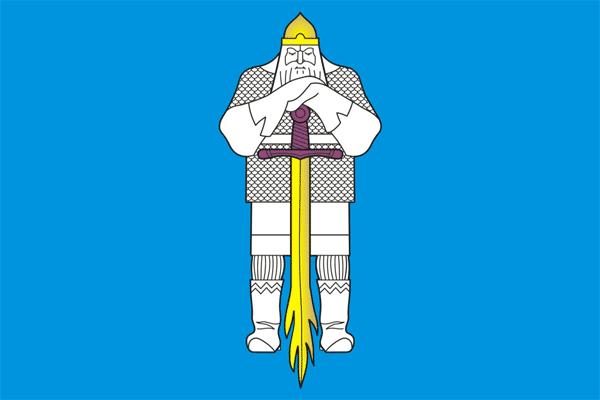
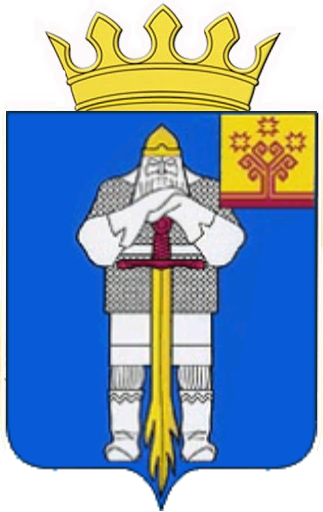
- Flag Coat of arms
- Location of Batyrevsky District in the Chuvash Republic
- Coordinates: 55.042°N 46.870°E
- Country: Russia
- Federal subject: Chuvash Republic
- Established: September 5, 1927
- Administrative center: Batyrevo

Area
  - Total: 944 km^{2} (364 sq mi)

Population (2010 Census)
  - Total: 38,620
  - Density: 40.9/km^{2} (106/sq mi)
  - Urban: 0%
  - Rural: 100%

Administrative structure
  - Administrative divisions: 19 rural settlement
  - Inhabited localities: 56 rural localities

Municipal structure
  - Municipally incorporated as: Batyrevsky Municipal District
  - Municipal divisions: 0 urban settlements, 19 rural settlements
- Time zone: UTC+3 (MSK)
- OKTMO ID: 97607000
- Website: http://gov.cap.ru/main.asp?govid=58

Batyrevsky District (Russian: Ба́тыревский райо́н; Chuvash: Патăрьел районӗ, Patăryel rayonĕ) is an administrative and municipal district (raion), one of the twenty-one in the Chuvash Republic, Russia. It is located in the southeast of the republic and borders with Komsomolsky and Ibresinsky Districts in the north, Yalchiksky District in the east, Shemurshinsky District and the Republic of Tatarstan in the south, and with Alatyrsky District in the west. The area of the district is 944 square kilometers (364 sq mi). Its administrative center is the rural locality (a selo) of Batyrevo. Population: 38,620 (2010 census); 41,769 (2002 census); 44,243 (1989 Soviet census). The population of Batyrevo accounts for 14.1% of the district's total population.

== History ==
The district was formed on September 5, 1927.

== Demographics ==
The Chuvash account for about 75% of the district's population and the Tatars account for 22%.
