= Kugesi =

Urban locality in Chuvashia, Russia

Coordinates: 56°01′53″N 47°17′56″E

Kugesi (Russian: Кугеси, Chuvash: Кӳкеç, Kükeś) is an urban-type settlement in Cheboksarsky District, the Chuvash Republic, Russia. Population: 11,917 (2010 census); 11,658 (2002 census); 9,540 (1989 Soviet census).
