= Novocheboksarsk =

City in Chuvashia, Russia

Novocheboksarsk Новочебоксарск
- City

Other transcription(s)
  - Chuvash: Ҫӗнӗ Шупашкар
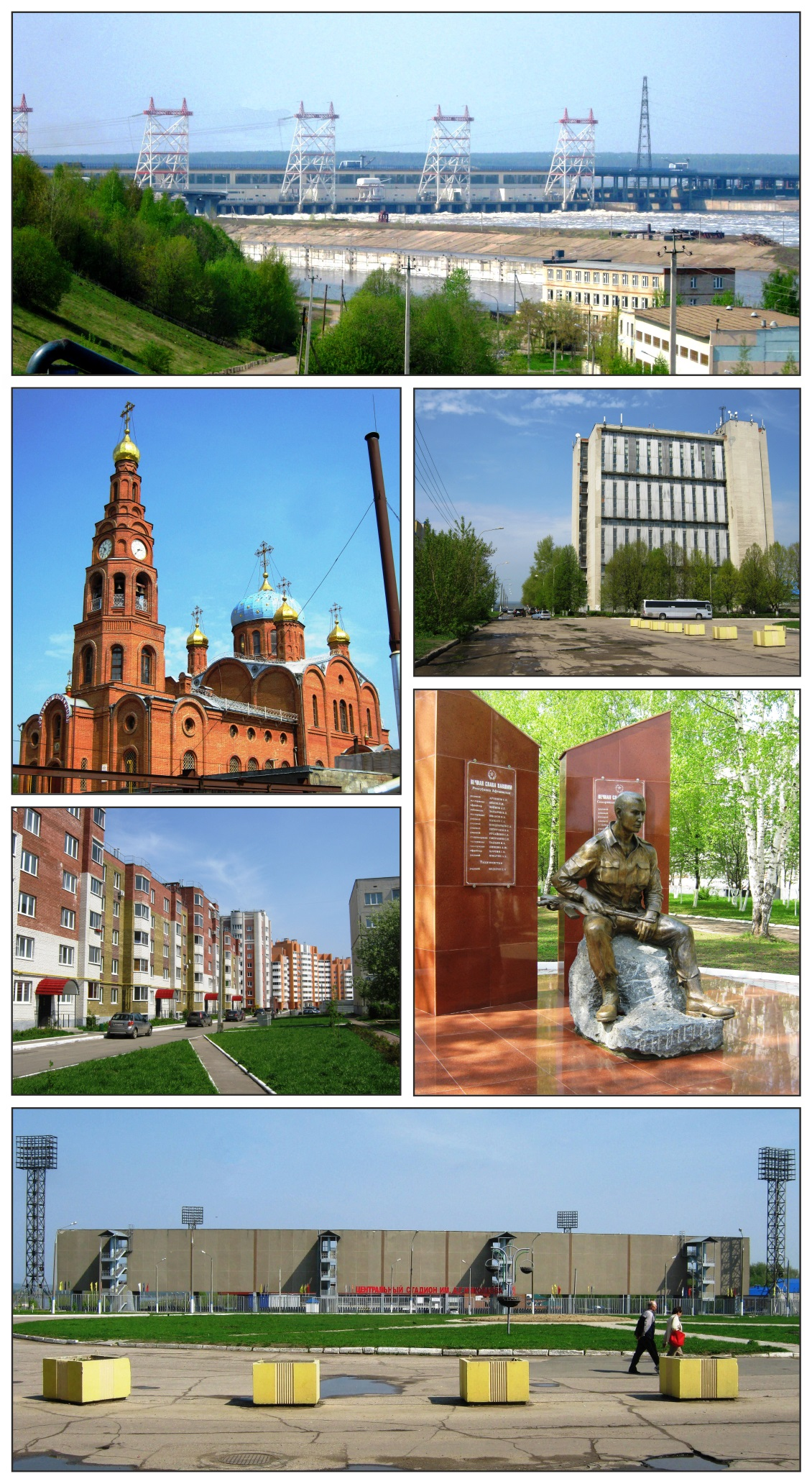
- Views of Novocheboksarsk

- Flag Coat of arms
- Interactive map of Novocheboksarsk
- Location of Novocheboksarsk Novocheboksarsk (Chuvash Republic)
- Coordinates: 56°08′N 47°30′E
- Country: Russia
- Federal subject: Chuvashia
- Founded: November 18, 1960
- City status since: 1971

Government
  - Body: City Assembly of Deputies
  - Head: Aleksandr Alekseyev

Area
  - Total: 36.7 km^{2} (14.2 sq mi)
- Elevation: 90 m (300 ft)

Population (2010 Census)
  - Total: 124,097
  - Estimate (2025): 120,616 (−2.8%)
  - Rank: 131st in 2010
  - Density: 3,380/km^{2} (8,760/sq mi)

Administrative status
  - Subordinated to: city of republic significance of Novocheboksarsk
  - Capital of: city of republic significance of Novocheboksarsk

Municipal status
  - Urban okrug: Novocheboksarsk Urban Okrug
  - Capital of: Novocheboksarsk Urban Okrug
- Time zone: UTC+3 (MSK)
- Postal codes: 429950–429952, 429954–429956, 429958–429960, 429965
- OKTMO ID: 97710000001
- Website: gov.cap.ru/main.asp?govid=82

Novocheboksarsk (Note: /ˌnɒvətʃɪbɒkˈsɑːrsk/; Russian: Новочебоксарск [nəvətɕɪbɐkˈsarsk]; Chuvash: Ҫӗнӗ Шупашкар, romanized: Cĕnĕ Şupaşkar) is the second-largest city in the republic of Chuvashia, Russia. It is located on the southern bank of the Volga River, about 3 kilometers (1.9 mi) east of Cheboksary, the capital city of the republic. It had a population of 124,097 (2010 census); 125,857 (2002 census); 114,760 (1989 Soviet census).

== History ==
It was founded in 1960 when a trend of building satellite cities started. Designed by architects from Leningrad, the city was initially called Sputnik (Russian: Спутник). Starting from relatively undeveloped land, the city grew to absorbed surrounding villages, such as Yelnikovo, Urakovo, Yandashevo, Anatkasy, and Tsygankasy. The first foundation was laid by a team of concrete workers on 18 November 1960. The first street in the city was opened on 12 July 1962, which included a school, a club, a library, a bathhouse, a restaurant, a market, and a transportation center. On

On 11 August 1965, the government of the Chuvash ASSR adopted a resolution giving administrative status to the city, now known as Novocheboksarsk. The resolution resulted in the city administratively absorbing the nearby villages of Bannovo, Ivanovo, Oldeyevo, Tenekassy, Chyodino, and Yandashevo.

On 27 December 1971 the Presidium of the Supreme Soviet of the Russian SFSR issued the Decree "On Granting the City of Novocheboksarsk of the Chuvash ASSR the Status of a City Under Republic Jurisdiction", giving Novocheboksarsk city status.

The city grew at a rapid rate, and on 29 October 1983 it passed 100,000 inhabitants.

In 1985, a monument was erected on Vinokurova Street to I. S. Semenovu, who fought to established Soviet power in Chuvashia.

The city consists of three residential areas comprising eighteen microdistricts. The available housing as of 1 August 1999 was 458 apartment houses: 39,452 apartments plus 4,033 rooms.

== Administrative and municipal status ==
Within the framework of administrative divisions, it is, together with the village of Oldeyevo, incorporated as the city of republic significance of Novocheboksarsk—an administrative unit with the status equal to that of the districts. As a municipal division, the city of republic significance of Novocheboksarsk is incorporated as Novocheboksarsk Urban Okrug.

== Culture ==
=== Media ===
The journal of the World Organisation of Culture of Health (″The World Health Culture Organization″) is based in Novocheboksarsk. In 1995, Victor Skumin became the first editor-in-chief of the journal To Health via Culture. The journal received an International Standard Serial Number (ISSN) 0204–3440. The main topics of the magazine are the dissemination of ideas of Culture of Health, holistic medicine, Agni Yoga and Roerichism.

=== Monuments ===
The city is home to several monuments. On Vinokurova Street, there is a monument to I. S. Semenovu, who fought to established Soviet power in Chuvashia. On Gidrostroiteley Boulevard, there is a monument to local residents who died during the Great Patriotic War.

=== Churches ===
The Church of the Holy Equal-to-the-Apostles Prince Vladimir, First Baptist of Rus' is a major church in the city.

== Transportation ==
Novocheboksarsk has a trolleybus system, buses and minibuses. The trolleybus fare is 24 cents, and the bus fare is 31 cents. The most popular is the minibus, which has 7 routes and 95 minibuses on them. The trolleybus system consists of 5 routes with a length of 121 kilometers and 56 trolleybuses on them.

Commercial taxi services are available too.

== Twin towns and sister cities ==
Novocheboksarsk is twinned with:

- Klimovsk, Russia
- Sterlitamak, Russia
- Žatec, Czech Republic
