= Kanashsky District =

Kanashsky District Канашский район (Russian)
- District

Other transcription(s)
  - Chuvash: Канаш районӗ
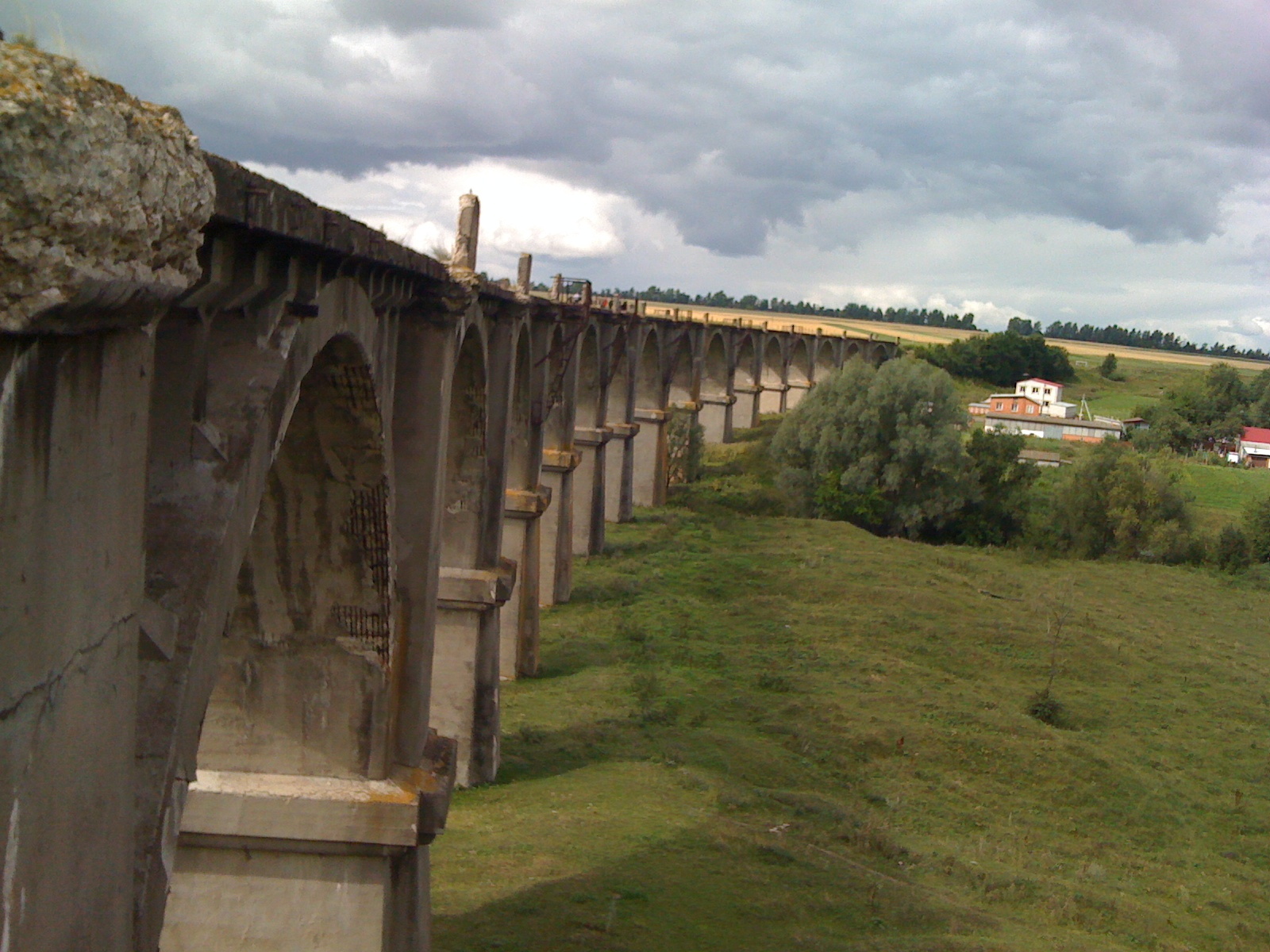
- Abandoned Bridge, Kanashsky District

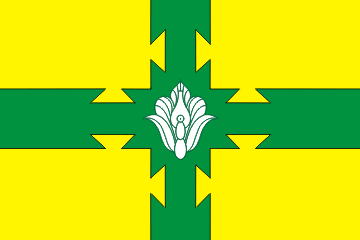
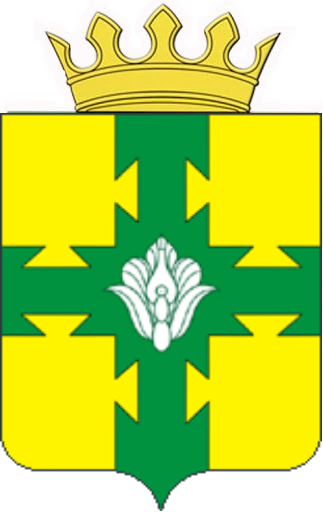
- Flag Coat of arms
- Location of Kanashsky District in the Chuvash Republic
- Coordinates: 55.525°N 47.139°E
- Country: Russia
- Federal subject: Chuvash Republic
- Established: September 5, 1927 MISCELLANEA----
- Administrative center: Kanash

Government
  - Body: ----STATISTICS----

Area
  - Total: 981.4 km^{2} (378.9 sq mi)

Population (2010 Census)
  - Total: 39,708
  - Density: 40.46/km^{2} (104.8/sq mi)
  - Urban: 0%
  - Rural: 100%

Administrative structure
  - Administrative divisions: 24 rural settlement
  - Inhabited localities----MUNICIPAL STATUS----: 108 rural localities

Municipal structure
  - Municipally incorporated as: Kanashsky Municipal District
  - Municipal divisions: 0 urban settlements, 24 rural settlements
- Time zone: UTC+3 (MSK)
- OKTMO ID: 97616000
- Website: http://gov.cap.ru/main.asp?govid=63

Kanashsky District (Russian: Кана́шский райо́н; Chuvash: Канаш районӗ, Kanaş rayonĕ) is an administrative and municipal district (raion), one of the twenty-one in the Chuvash Republic, Russia. It is located in the eastern central part of the republic and borders with Tsivilsky and Krasnarmeysky Districts in the north, Urmarsky and Yantikovsky Districts in the east, Komsomolsky and Ibresinsky Districts in the south, and with Vurnarsky District in the west. The area of the district is 981.4 square kilometers (378.9 sq mi). Its administrative center is the town of Kanash (which is not administratively a part of the district). Population: 39,708 (2010 census); 42,623 (2002 Census); 46,236 (1989 Soviet census).

== History ==
The district was established on September 5, 1927.

== Administrative and municipal status ==
Within the framework of administrative divisions, Kanashsky District is one of the twenty-one in the republic. The town of Kanash serves as its administrative center, despite being incorporated separately as a town of republic significance—an administrative unit with the status equal to that of the districts.

As a municipal division, the district is incorporated as Kanashsky Municipal District. The town of republic significance of Kanash is incorporated separately from the district as Kanash Urban Okrug.
