= Poretsky District =

Poretsky District Порецкий район (Russian)
- District

Other transcription(s)
  - Chuvash: Пăрачкав районӗ
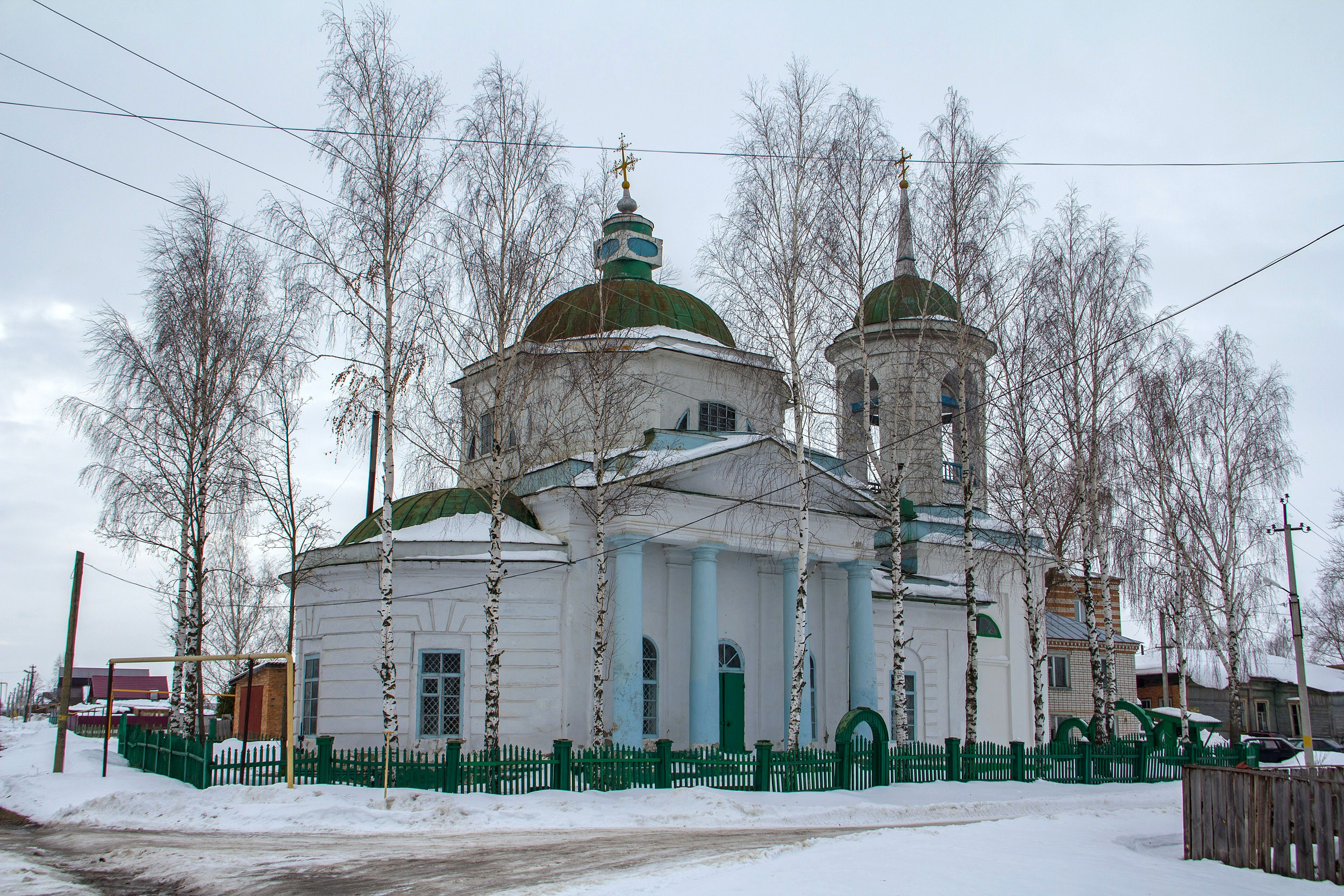
- Church of the Holy Apostles Peter and Paul, Poretsky District

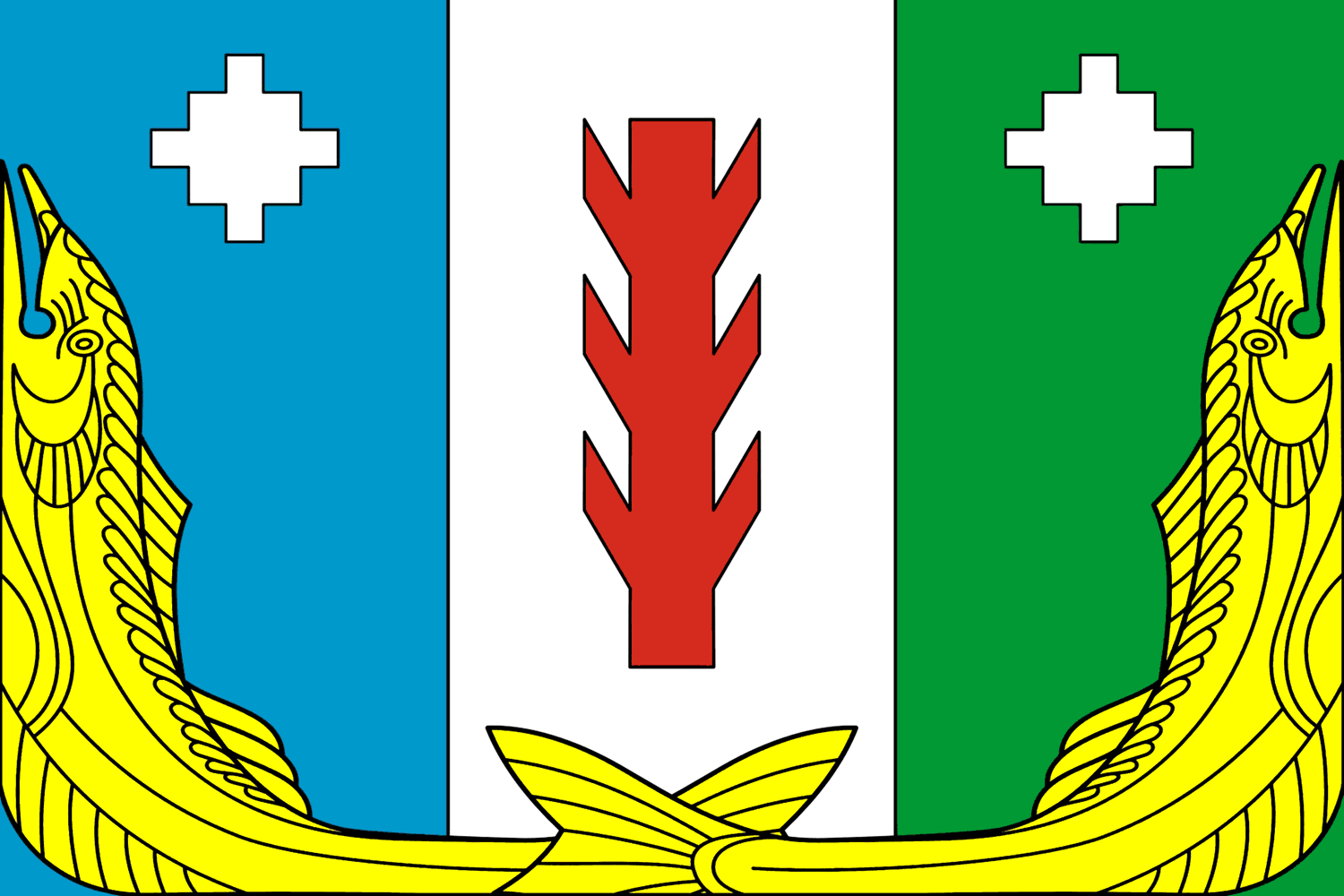
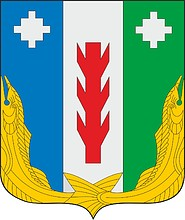
- Flag Coat of arms
- Location of Poretsky District in the Chuvash Republic
- Coordinates: 55.179°N 46.112°E
- Country: Russia
- Federal subject: Chuvash Republic
- Established: 5 September 1927
- Administrative center: Poretskoye

Area
  - Total: 1,116.9 km^{2} (431.2 sq mi)

Population (2010 Census)
  - Total: 13,992
  - Density: 12.528/km^{2} (32.446/sq mi)
  - Urban: 0%
  - Rural: 100%

Administrative structure
  - Administrative divisions: 12 rural settlement
  - Inhabited localities: 37 rural localities

Municipal structure
  - Municipally incorporated as: Poretsky Municipal District
  - Municipal divisions: 0 urban settlements, 12 rural settlements
- Time zone: UTC+3 (MSK)
- OKTMO ID: 97635000
- Website: http://gov.cap.ru/main.asp?govid=72

Poretsky District (Russian: Поре́цкий район; Chuvash: Пăрачкав районӗ, Păraçkav rayonĕ) is an administrative and municipal district (raion), one of the twenty-one in the Chuvash Republic, Russia. It is located in the southwest of the republic. The area of the district is 1,116.9 square kilometers (431.2 sq mi). Its administrative center is the rural locality (a selo) of Poretskoye. Population: 13,992 (2010 census); 17,311 (2002 Census); 19,486 (1989 Soviet census). The population of Poretskoye accounts for 41.6% of the district's total population.
