= Mariinsko-Posadsky District =

Mariinsko-Posadsky District Мариинско-Посадский район (Russian)
- District

Other transcription(s)
  - Chuvash: Сĕнтĕрвăрри районӗ
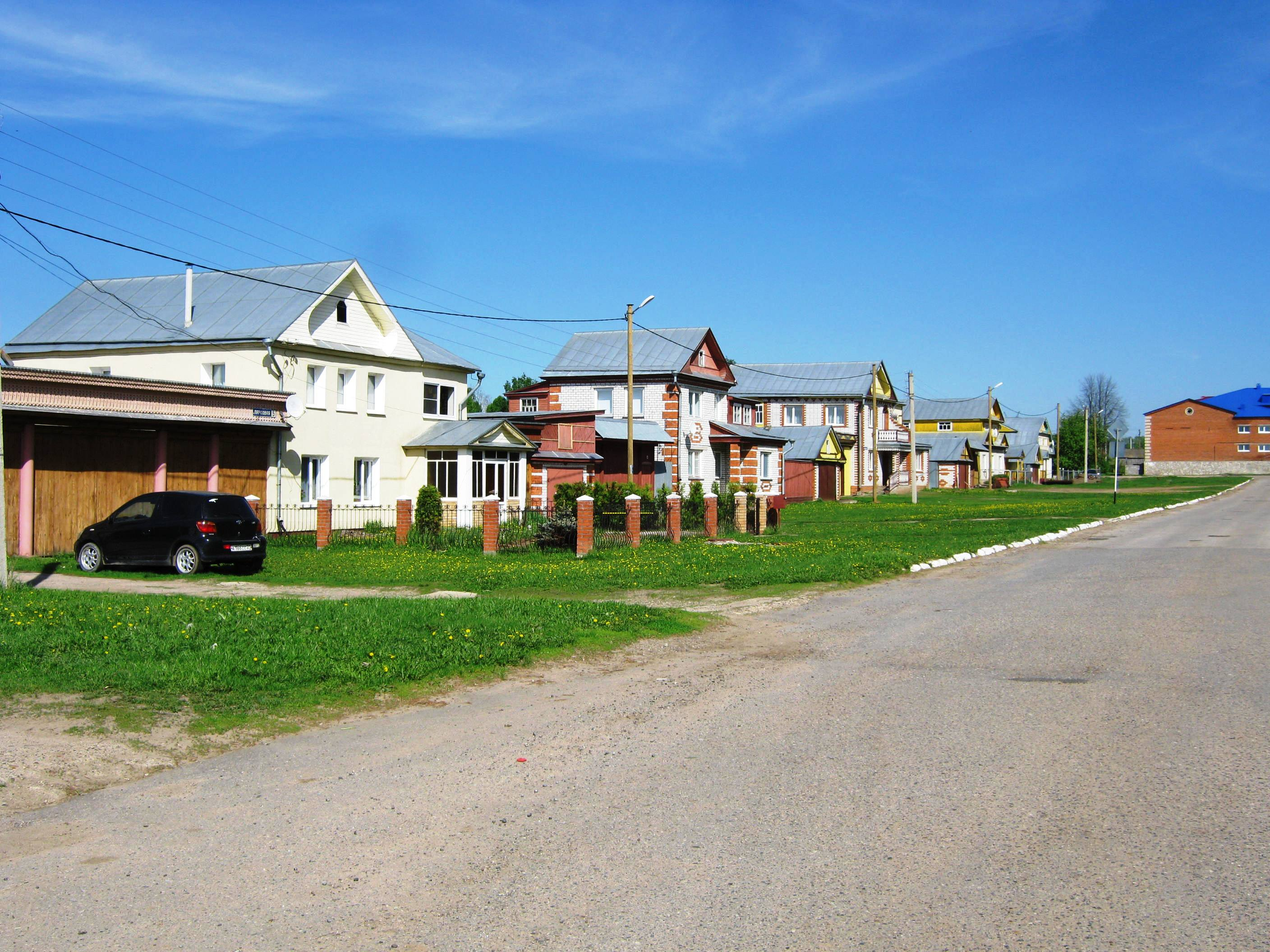
- The selo of Shorshely in Mariinsko-Posadsky District

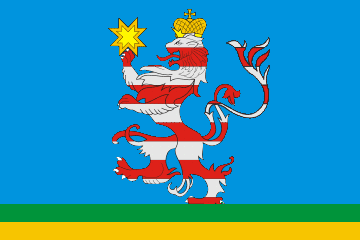
- Flag
- Location of Mariinsko-Posadsky District in the Chuvash Republic
- Coordinates: 56°07′N 47°43′E
- Country: Russia
- Federal subject: Chuvash Republic
- Established: 1927
- Administrative center: Mariinsky Posad

Area
  - Total: 686.1 km^{2} (264.9 sq mi)

Population (2010 Census)
  - Total: 23,895
  - Density: 34.83/km^{2} (90.20/sq mi)
  - Urban: 38.0%
  - Rural: 62.0%

Administrative structure
  - Administrative divisions: 1 Urban settlements, 11 Rural settlements
  - Inhabited localities: 1 cities/towns, 78 rural localities

Municipal structure
  - Municipally incorporated as: Mariinsko-Posadsky Municipal District
  - Municipal divisions: 1 urban settlements, 11 rural settlements
- Time zone: UTC+3 (MSK)
- OKTMO ID: 97629000
- Website: http://gov.cap.ru/main.asp?govid=70

Mariinsko-Posadsky District (Russian: Марии́нско-Поса́дский район; Chuvash: Сĕнтĕрвăрри районӗ, Sĕntĕrvărri rayonĕ) is an administrative and municipal district (raion), one of the twenty-one in the Chuvash Republic, Russia. It is located in the northeast of the republic. The area of the district is 686.1 square kilometers (264.9 sq mi). Its administrative center is the town of Mariinsky Posad. Population: 23,895 (2010 census); 26,959 (2002 Census); 29,069 (1989 Soviet census). The population of Mariinsky Posad accounts for 38.0% of the district's total population.
