= Alatyrsky District =

Alatyrsky District Алатырский район (Russian)
- District

Other transcription(s)
  - Chuvash: Улатăр районӗ
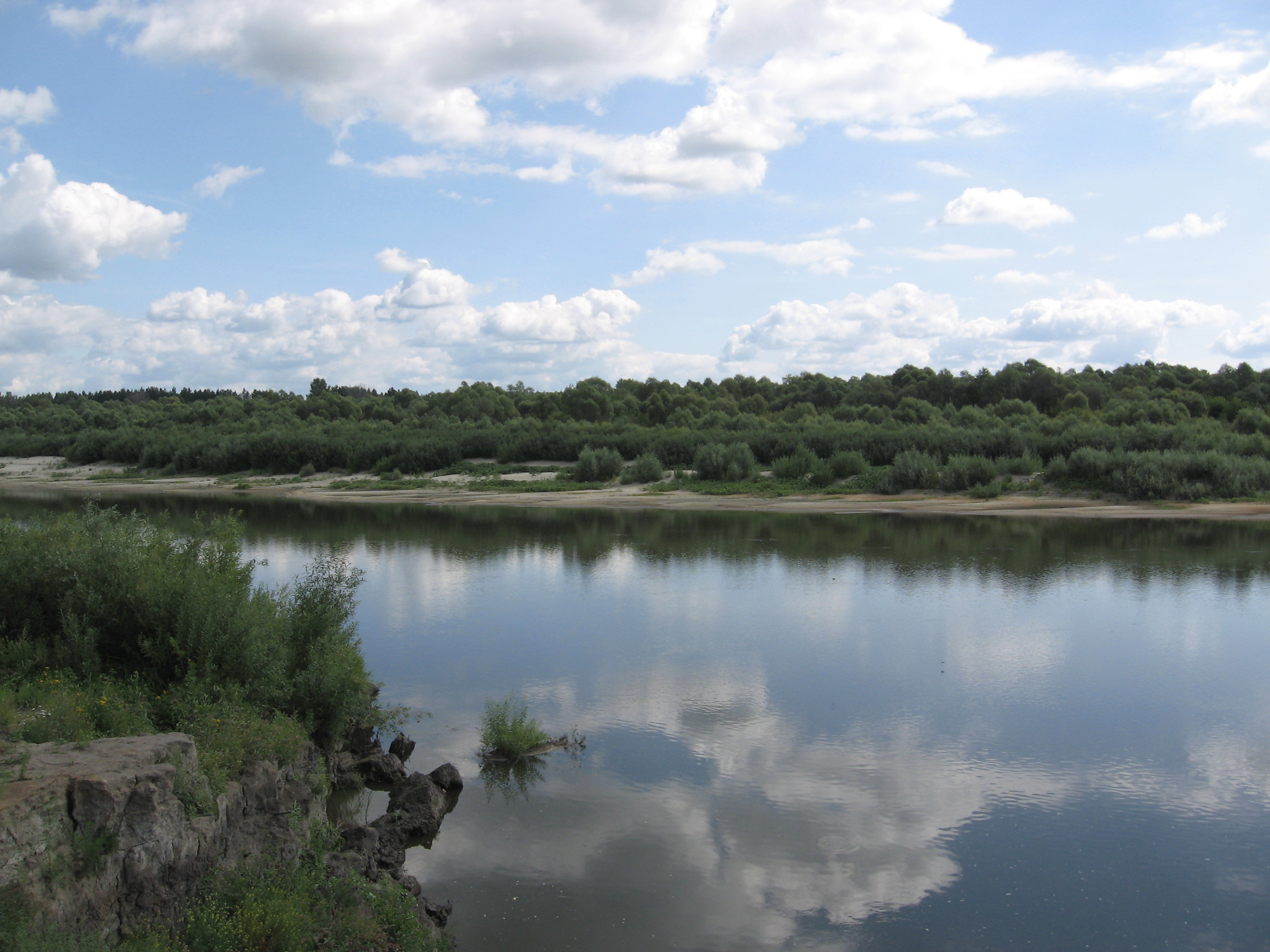
- Sura River, Alatyrsky District

- Flag Coat of arms
- Location of Alatyrsky District in the Chuvash Republic
- Coordinates: 54°55′00″N 46°45′00″E
- Country: Russia
- Federal subject: Chuvash Republic
- Administrative center: Alatyr

Area
  - Total: 1,940 km^{2} (750 sq mi)

Population (2010 Census)
  - Total: 17,244
  - Density: 8.89/km^{2} (23.0/sq mi)
  - Urban: 0%
  - Rural: 100%

Administrative structure
  - Administrative divisions: 16 rural settlement
  - Inhabited localities: 46 rural localities

Municipal structure
  - Municipally incorporated as: Alatyrsky Municipal District
  - Municipal divisions: 0 urban settlements, 16 rural settlements
- Time zone: UTC+3 (MSK)
- OKTMO ID: 97603000
- Website: http://gov.cap.ru/main.asp?govid=55

Alatyrsky District (Russian: Ала́тырский райо́н; Chuvash: Улатăр районӗ, Ulatăr rayonĕ) is an administrative and municipal district (raion), one of the twenty-one in the Chuvash Republic, Russia. It is located in the south of the republic. The area of the district is 1,940 square kilometers (750 sq mi). Its administrative center is the town of Alatyr (which is not administratively a part of the district). Population: 17,244 (2010 census); 21,630 (2002 Census); 26,007 (1989 Soviet census).

== Administrative and municipal status ==
Within the framework of administrative divisions, Alatyrsky District is one of the twenty-one in the republic. The town of Alatyr serves as its administrative center, despite being incorporated separately as a town of republic significance—an administrative unit with the status equal to that of the districts.

As a municipal division, the district is incorporated as Alatyrsky Municipal District. The town of republic significance of Alatyr is incorporated separately from the district as Alatyr Urban Okrug.
