= Morgaushsky District =

Morgaushsky District Моргаушский район (Russian)
- District

Other transcription(s)
  - Chuvash: Муркаш районӗ
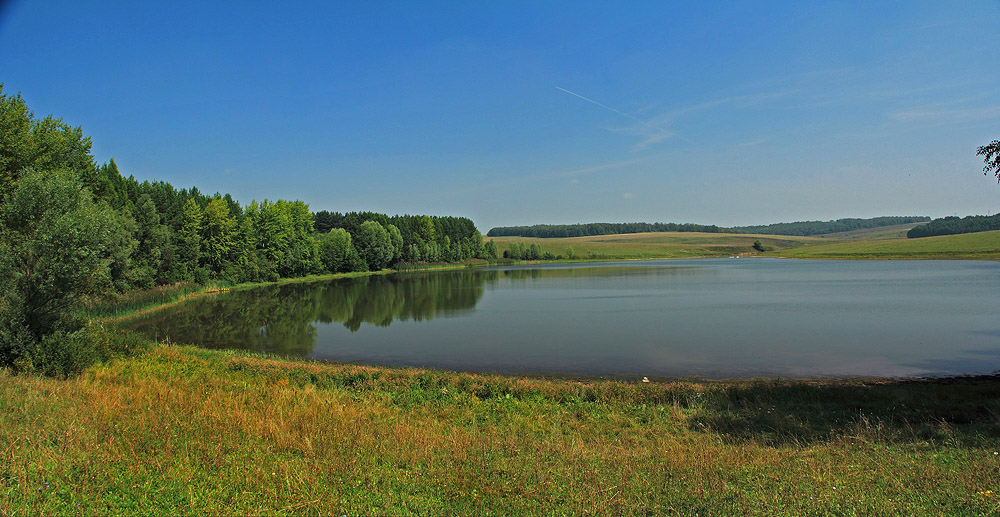
- Lake Syutkyul, Morgaushsky District

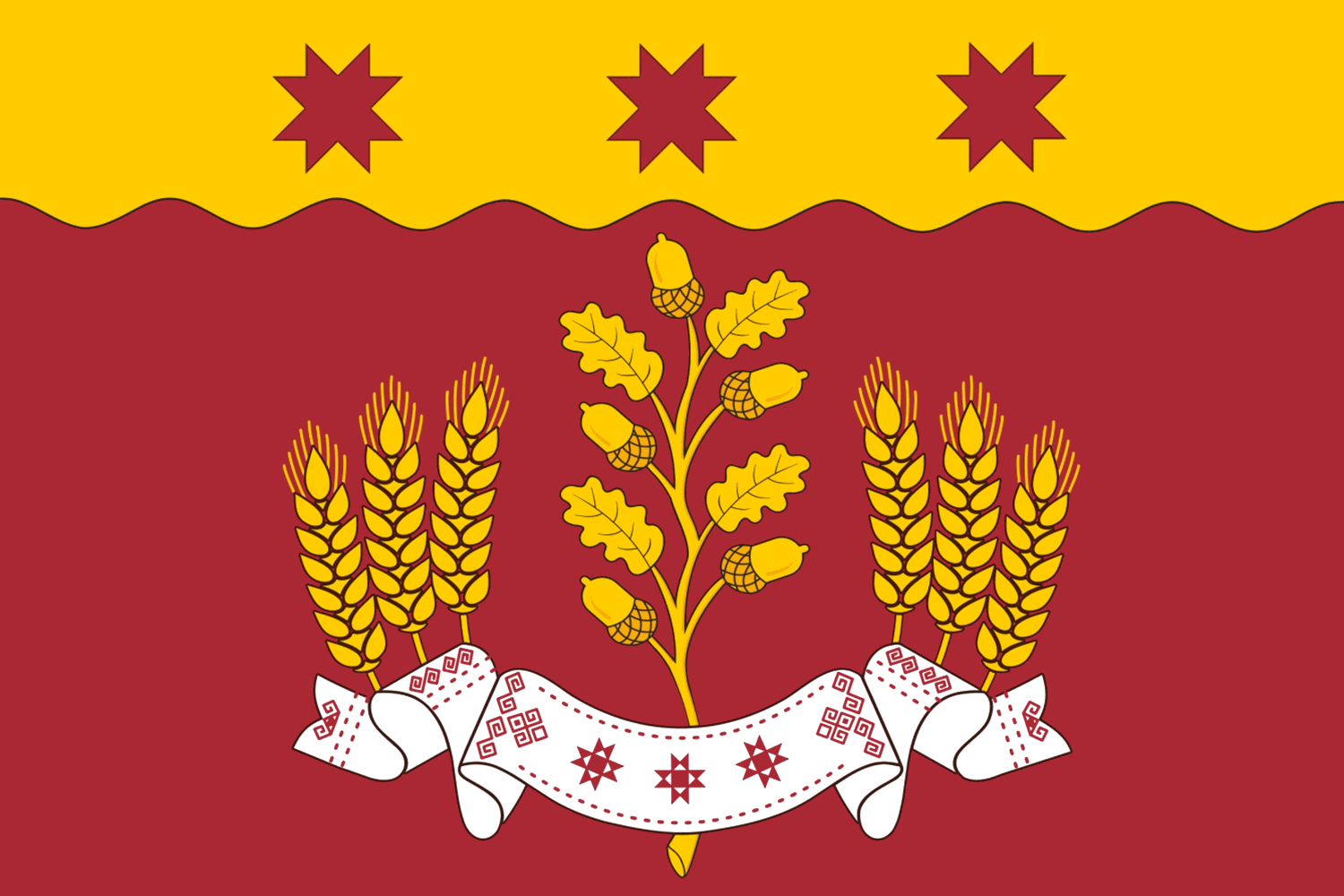
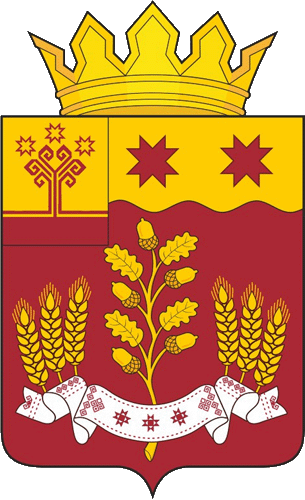
- Flag Coat of arms
- Location of Morgaushsky District in the Chuvash Republic
- Coordinates: 56.026°N 46.453°E
- Country: Russia
- Federal subject: Chuvash Republic
- Established: February 10, 1944
- Administrative center: Morgaushi

Area
  - Total: 845.3 km^{2} (326.4 sq mi)

Population (2010 Census)
  - Total: 34,884
  - Density: 41.27/km^{2} (106.9/sq mi)
  - Urban: 0%
  - Rural: 100%

Administrative structure
  - Administrative divisions: 16 rural settlement
  - Inhabited localities: 177 rural localities

Municipal structure
  - Municipally incorporated as: Morgaushsky Municipal District
  - Municipal divisions: 0 urban settlements, 16 rural settlements
- Time zone: UTC+3 (MSK)
- OKTMO ID: 97632000
- Website: http://gov.cap.ru/main.asp?govid=71

Morgaushsky District (Russian: Морга́ушский райо́н; Chuvash: Муркаш районӗ, Murkaş rayonĕ) is an administrative and municipal district (raion), one of the twenty-one in the Chuvash Republic, Russia. It is located in the north of the republic and borders with the Mari El Republic in the north, Cheboksarsky District in the east, Alikovsky District in the south, and with Yadrinsky District in the west. The area of the district is 845.3 square kilometers (326.4 sq mi). Its administrative center is the rural locality (a selo) of Morgaushi. Population: 34,884 (2010 census); 37,127 (2002 census); 38,465 (1989 Soviet census).

== History ==
The district was formed on February 10, 1944.

== Notable residents ==
- Vera Sokolova (born 1987 in Solianoy), race walker
