= State Council of the Chuvash Republic =

Regional parliament of Chuvashia, Russia

State Council of the Chuvash Republic Государственный Совет Чувашской Республики
- 7th legislature

Type
- Type: Unicameral

Leadership
- Chairman: Leonid Cherkesov, United Russia since 29 September 2021

Structure
- Seats: 44
- Political groups: United Russia (30); CPRF (7); SRZP (4); LDPR (1); RPPSJ (1); New People (1)

Elections
- Voting system: Mixed
- Last election: 19 September 2021
- Next election: 2026

Meeting place
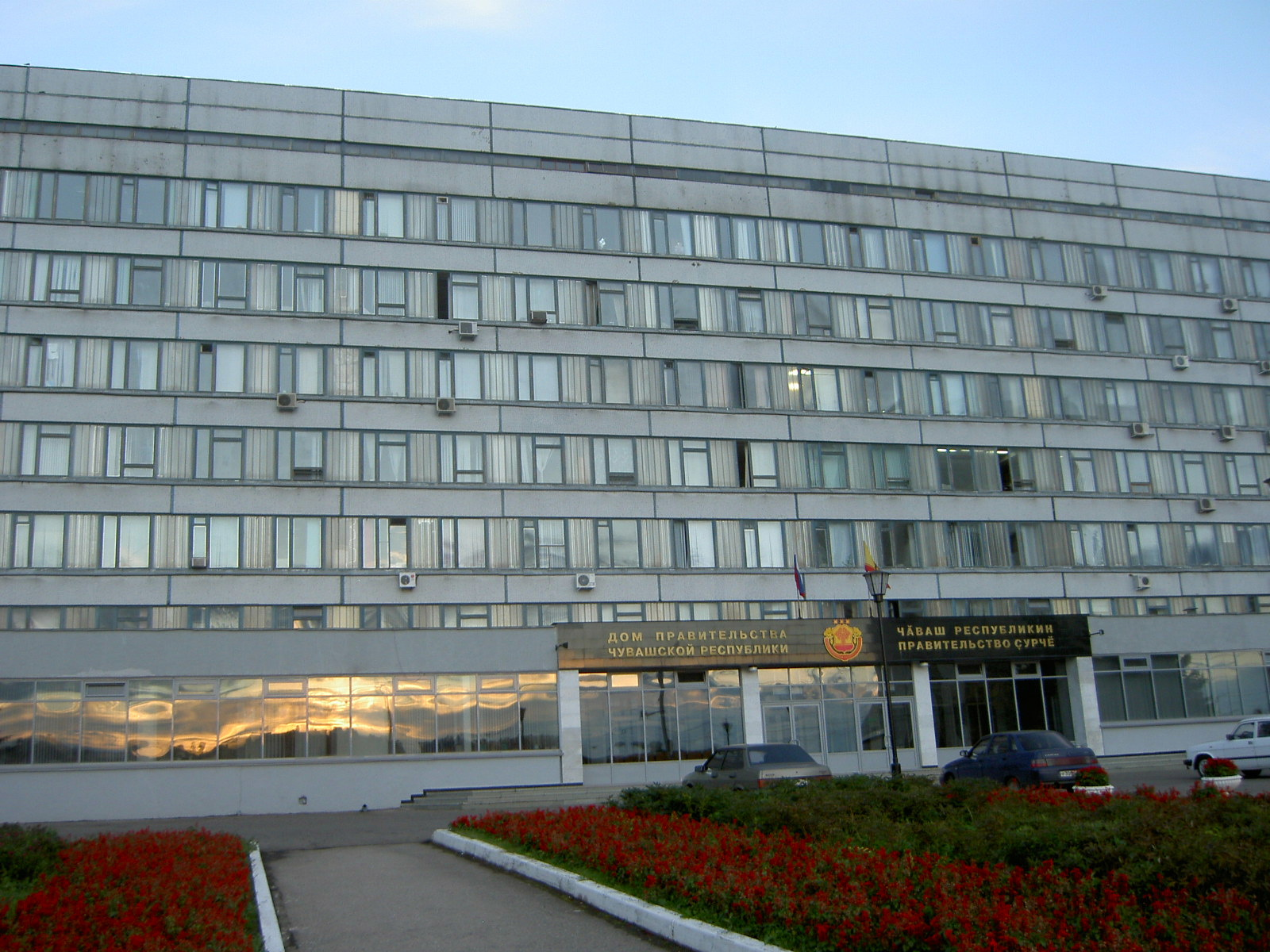

Website
- gs.cap.ru

The State Council of the Chuvash Republic (Russian: Государственный Совет Чувашской Республики, romanized: Gosudarstvennyy Sovyet Chuvashskoy Respubliki; Chuvash: Чăваш Республикин Патшалăх Канашĕ, romanized: Čăvaš Respublikin Patšalăh Kanašĕ) is the regional parliament of Chuvashia, a federal subject of Russia. It consists of 44 deputies elected for five-year terms.

The presiding officer is the chairman.

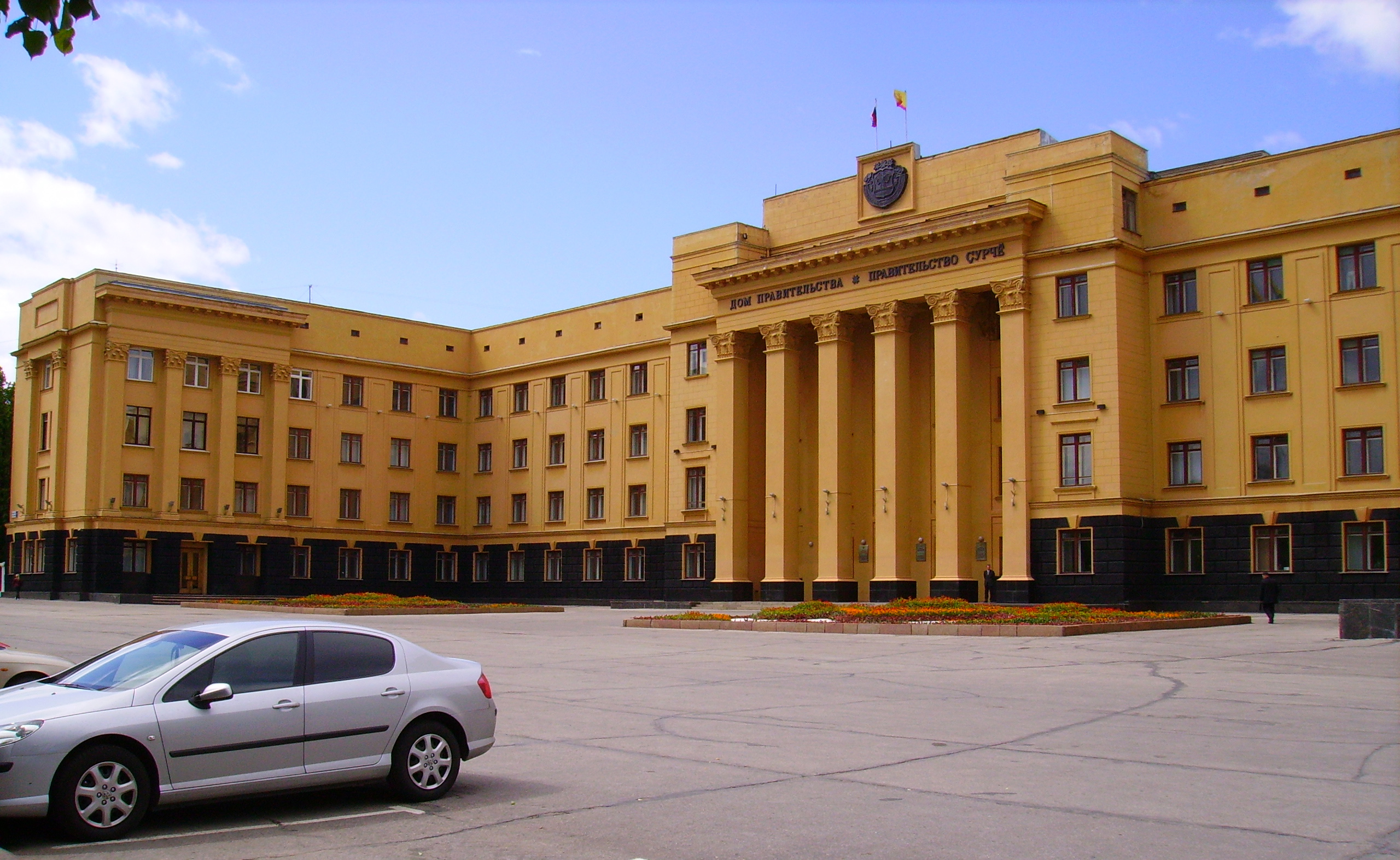
In 2004, the State Council was moved from the old House of Soviets to the current location

== Elections ==
=== 2016 ===
Party	%	Seats
United Russia	50.70	36
Communist Party of the Russian Federation	14.46	3
Liberal Democratic Party of Russia	12.84	3
A Just Russia	12.59	2
Registered voters/turnout	59.23	

=== 2021 ===
Party	%	Seats
United Russia	34.96	30
Communist Party of the Russian Federation	21.35	7
A Just Russia — For Truth	15.13	4
Liberal Democratic Party of Russia	7.06	1
Russian Party of Pensioners for Social Justice	6.94	1
New People	5.93	1
Registered voters/turnout	56.08	

== See also ==
- List of chairpersons of the State Council of the Chuvash Republic

== Sources ==
- Administrative structure of the republic
