= List of rural localities in Chuvashia =

Map of Russia with Chuvashia highlighted

This is a list of rural localities in Chuvashia. The Chuvash Republic (Russian: Чува́шская Респу́блика — Чува́шия, Chuvashskaya Respublika — Chuvashiya; Chuvash: Чӑваш Республики, Čăvaš Respubliki), or Chuvashia (Russian: Чува́шия Chuvashiya; Chuvash: Чӑваш Ен, Čăvaš Jen), is a federal subject of Russia (a republic). It is the homeland of the Chuvash people, a Turkic ethnic group. Its capital is the city of Cheboksary. As of the 2010 Census, its population was 1,251,619.

== Alikovsky District ==
Rural localities in Alikovsky District:

- Alikovo
- Bolshiye Toktashi
- Khirlepposi
- Siner
- Tautovo

== Batyrevsky District ==
Rural localities in Batyrevsky District:

- Batyrevo

== Cheboksarsky District ==
Rural localities in Cheboksarsky District:

- Abashevo

== Ibresinsky District ==
Rural localities in Ibresinsky District:

- Alshikhovo

== Kanashsky District ==
Rural localities in Kanashsky District:

- Sespel

== Komsomolsky District ==
Rural localities in Komsomolsky District:

- Komsomolskoye

== Krasnoarmeysky District ==
Rural localities in Krasnoarmeysky District:

- Krasnoarmeyskoye

== Krasnochetaysky District ==
Rural localities in Krasnochetaysky District:

- Krasnye Chetai

== Morgaushsky District ==
Rural localities in Morgaushsky District:

- Avdankasy
- Morgaushi

== Poretsky District ==
Rural localities in Poretsky District:

- Poretskoye

== Shemurshinsky District ==
Rural localities in Shemurshinsky District:

- Shemursha

== Urmarsky District ==
Rural localities in Urmarsky District:

- Arabosi

== Vurnarsky District ==
Rural localities in Vurnarsky District:

- Algazino
- Azim Sirma
- Azimsirminskoye
- Kalinino

== Yalchiksky District ==
Rural localities in Yalchiksky District:

- Yalchiki

== Yantikovsky District ==
Rural localities in Yantikovsky District:

- Yanshikhovo-Norvashi
- Yantikovo

== See also ==
- Lists of rural localities in Russia
