= Takhti =

Takhti may refer to

- Takhti (surname)
- Godar Takhti, a village in Iran
- Khan Takhti, a village in Iran
- Takhti Metro Station (Isfahan) in Iran
- Takhti Stadium (disambiguation), multiple stadiums in Iran named after Gholamreza Takhti
- Takhti-Sangin, an ancient town in Tajikistan
- Takhti Khel, a town in Pakistan
- Takhti Khel Wazir, a town and union council in Pakistan
- PAC-PAD Takhti 7, a Pakistani tablet computer
