= Kanash (inhabited locality) =

Kanash (Russian: Канаш) is the name of several inhabited localities in Russia.

Urban localities

- Kanash, a town in the Chuvash Republic

Rural localities

- Kanash, Republic of Bashkortostan, a village in Slakbashevsky Selsoviet of Belebeyevsky District in the Republic of Bashkortostan
- Kanash, Morgaushsky District, Chuvash Republic, a vyselok in Yunginskoye Rural Settlement of Morgaushsky District in the Chuvash Republic
- Kanash, Shemurshinsky District, Chuvash Republic, a settlement in Shemurshinskoye Rural Settlement of Shemurshinsky District in the Chuvash Republic
- Kanash, Yadrinsky District, Chuvash Republic, a village in Bolshesundyrskoye Rural Settlement of Yadrinsky District in the Chuvash Republic
- Kanash, Kaliningrad Oblast, a settlement in Zhilinsky Rural Okrug of Nemansky District in Kaliningrad Oblast
- Kanash, Kemerovo Oblast, a selo in Trudarmeyskaya Rural Territory of Prokopyevsky District in Kemerovo Oblast; 54°5′N 86°20′E
- Kanash, Krasnoyarsk Krai, a village in Sakhaptinsky Selsoviet of Nazarovsky District in Krasnoyarsk Krai
- Kanash, Novosibirsk Oblast, a village in Severny District of Novosibirsk Oblast
- Kanash, Verkhneuslonsky District, Republic of Tatarstan, a village in Verkhneuslonsky District of the Republic of Tatarstan
- Kanash, Zainsky District, Republic of Tatarstan, a village in Zainsky District of the Republic of Tatarstan
- Kanash, Tyumen Oblast, a selo in Kanashsky Rural Okrug of Nizhnetavdinsky District in Tyumen Oblast
