= Vera Kuzmina =

Soviet actor (1923–2021)

- Вера Кузьмина
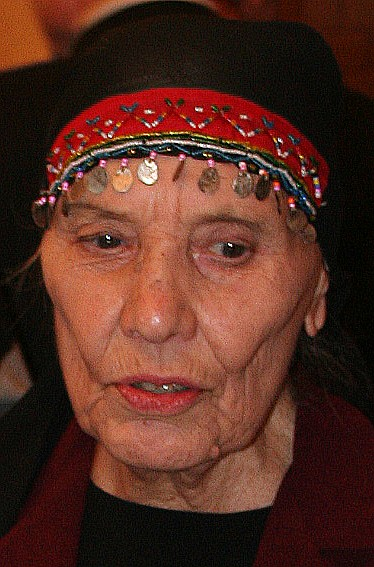
- Kuzmina in 2008
- Born: 16 November 1923; Yanshikhovo-Norvashi, Russian SFSR, Soviet Union
- Died: 22 October 2021 (aged 97); Cheboksary, Russia
- Occupations: Actor; Reader
- Years active: 1947–2021

Vera Kuzminichna Kuzmina (Note: Chuvash: Вера Кузьминична Кузьмина, romanized: Vera Kuzminichna Kuzmina; Russian: Вера Кузьминична Кузьмина, romanized: Vera Kuzminichna Kuzmina) (16 November 1923 – 22 October 2021) was a Soviet and Chuvash theatre actress and reader. She was decorated as a People's Artist of the USSR in 1980.

== Biography ==
Kuzmina was born in the village of Yanshikhovo-Norvashi (now in the Yantikovsky District, Chuvashia, Russia) on 16 November 1923. During the Great Patriotic War (1941–1943), she worked near Smolensk, in the Moscow region on logging. Graduated from the Lunacharsky State Institute of Theater Arts (GITIS) in Moscow. The first teacher was the actor of the Moscow Art Theatre Mikhail Tarkhanov.

From 1947 she served at the Chuvash Academic Drama Theater named after K. V. Ivanov in Cheboksary, was a leading actress of the theatre. She played more than 100 roles on stage. For more than 60 years of work in theatre, she embodied images of Russian and foreign classics, as well as works of national Chuvash literature and drama on the Chuvash stage. Among the female roles, the images of mothers stand out in the performances: "Black Bread" by Ilbekov, "Bloody Wedding" by F. Garcia Lorca, "Siberian Division" and "The Cuckoo Cooks Everything" by Terentyev, "Narspi" by Ivanov, "Aidar" by Osipov, "Blackberries Along the Fence" by Boris Cheendykov and many others.

Kuzmina worked on the radio; reading poems, short stories and novellas. She participated in radio and television productions. Her artistic reading is an example of Chuvash stage speech. Since 1952, she has participated in dubbing more than 300 films into the Chuvash language. She was for a number of years the chairman of the Chuvash branch of the Soviet Cultural Foundation.

In 1994 a documentary film "The Cycle of Time" was shot about the work of the actress according to the script by Alekseev ("Chuvashcinema" and the Kazan Newsreel Studio).

== Personal life and death ==
Kuzmina was married to Pyotr Khuzangai (1907–1970), a Chuvash poet. She had two children; one son and one daughter. Her son, Atner Khuzangai (born 1948), is a noted philologist and literary critic.

She died after a long illness in Shupashkar, on 22 October 2021, at the age of 97.

== Awards and recognition ==
- People's Artist of the USSR in 1980
- Laureate of the State Prize of the Chuvash ASSR (1991)
- Order "For Merit to the Fatherland" IV class (1999)
- Honorary Citizen of the Chuvash Republic (2003)
- Order of Honour (2014)
- Russian National Theater Award "Golden Mask" (2018)
