= Lashch-Tayaba =

Lashch-Tayaba Лащ-Таяба Лаш Таяпа
- Village
- Location within Russia
- Coordinates: 55°01′6″N 47°59′44″E
- Country: Russia
- Chuvashia: Yalchiksky District
- Population (2012): 1,036
- Time zone: UTC+4 (EET)
  - Summer (DST): UTC+4 (EEST)

Lashch-Tayaba (Russian: Лащ-Таяба; Chuvash: Лаш Таяпа, Laş Tayapa) is a rural locality (a village) in the Lashch-Tayaba Rural Settlement municipality of Yalchiksky District of the Chuvash Republic, Russia, the administratrive center of the municipality. It is located 18 kilometers (11 mi) west of Yalchiki, the administrative center of the district. Population: 1036 (2012 est.).

The Lashchi River flows through the village.

The Russian Orthodox Church of the Nativity of the Virgin Mary was built in the village in 1840. It was closed and completely destroyed in the 1940s. The parish resumed its activities in 1991 in a former school building reconstructed as a church. In 2016, a new church was consecrated.

== Notable people ==
- Vasily Ektel, Chuvash writer
- Yuri Alekseevich Popov, Chairman of the State Council of Chuvashia
