= Chuvash Book Publishing House =

- Status: active
- Predecessor: Chuvashgiz
- Founded: 1920
- Country of origin: Soviet Union, Russia
- Headquarters location: Cheboksary, Chuvash Republic
- Key people: V. P. Komissarov
- Official website: http://www.chuvbook.ru/

The Chuvash Book Publishing House is the Republican state unitary enterprise producing fiction, children's, educational, political etc. literature in Chuvash, Russian, English. Provides educational institutions of the Chuvash Republic and the Chuvash Diaspora with educational and methodical literature, completes book funds of libraries, is engaged in trade in book production and industrial goods. Since 1996 the publishing House is a member of the Association of book publishers of the Russian Federation.

== History ==
Founded 12 Nov 1920 as the Chuvash branch of the State publishing house (Chuvashgiz). Since 1963 — Chuvash Book Publishing House, since 2004 - modern name. There are 66 people in the staff (2011).

Over the years of its activity, the publishing house has released about 17 thousand titles of books and brochures with a circulation of over 132280 thousand copies, including in 2012-110 titles with a circulation of 323.3 thousand copies.

Published works included in the golden fund of Chuvash culture:

- complete works of Konstantin Ivanov, Mikhail Sespel, Fyodor Pavlov;
- multi-volume collections of works by Semyon Elger, Pyotr Khuzangai, Yakov Ukhsai, Gennadiy Aygi;
- collections of selected works by Nikolai Shelebi, Egor Elliev, Valery Rzai, Alexander Alga, Alexander Artemyev, Stihvan Shavly and others writers;
- collected works of Nikolay Nikolsky and Mikhailov-Yandush.

The book series "Wonderful people of Chuvashia", "Library of the President of the Chuvash Republic","From the experience of folk masters", " Research. In theory. Hypotheses","Chuvash folk art","Literary monuments","School library", encyclopedias of the Chuvash Republic and districts,"Memory - Astavam" (11 books), etc.

In March 2012 Chuvash Book Publishing House by order of the Ministry of Education and Science of the Russian Federation was included in the list of organizations publishing textbooks that are allowed to be used in the educational process in schools and other educational institutions with state accreditation.
