= Nemtsev =

Nemtsev (Russian: Немцев, literally "Germans") is a Russian masculine surname, its feminine counterpart is Nemtseva. It may refer to

- Alexey Nemtsev (born 1982), Kazakhstani ski-orienteering competitor
- Nina Nemtseva, Soviet and Uzbek scholar-medievalist, archaeologist and architect-restorer
- Viktor Nemtsev (1936-2018), Chuvash painter
