= Mišši =

Mišši or Mishshi is a Chuvash masculine given name, an equivalent of Michael. Notable people with the name include:

- Mišši Juhma
- Mišši Śeśpĕl, Chuvash poet
