= Yefremkasinskoye Rural Settlement =

Yefremkasinskoye Rural Settlement (Russian: Ефремкасинское се́льское поселе́ние; Chuvash: Ехремкасси ял тăрăхĕ, Yountapa jal tărăkhĕ) is an administrative and municipal division (a rural settlement) of Alikovsky District of the Chuvash Republic, Russia. It is located in the central part of the district. Its administrative center is the rural locality (a village) of Yefremkasy. Rural settlement's population: 2,608 (2006 est.).

Yefremkasinskoye Rural Settlement comprises thirteen rural localities.

The Cheboksary–Vurnary highway crosses the territory of the rural settlement.
