= Chubukaran, Slakbashevsky Selsoviet, Belebeyevsky District, Republic of Bashkortostan =

Chubukaran Чубукаран
- Village
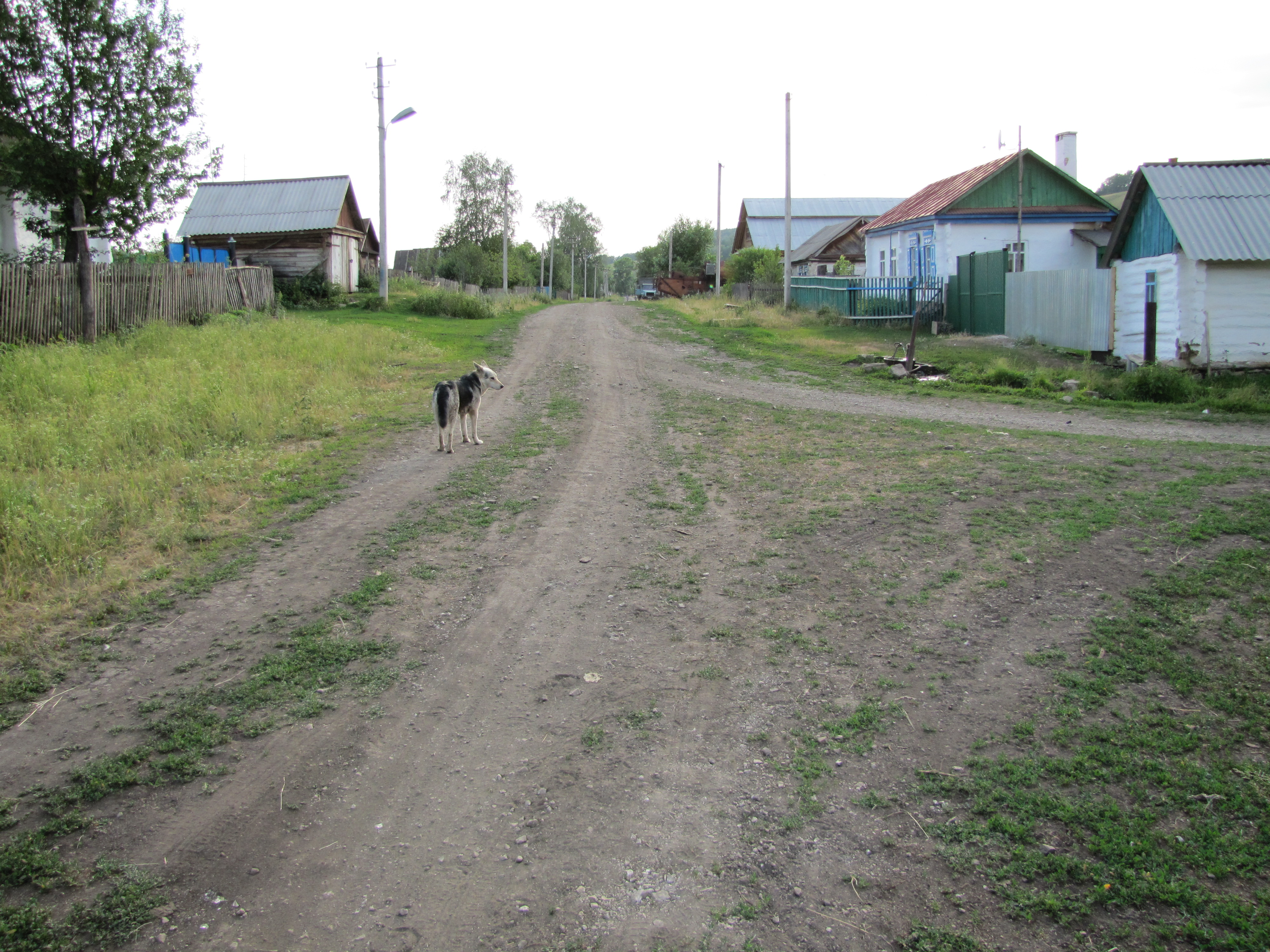

- Location within Bashkortostan Location within Russia
- Coordinates: 53°58′N 54°30′E
- Country: Russia
- Region: Bashkortostan
- District: Belebeyevsky District
- Time zone: UTC+5:00

Chubukaran (Russian: Чубукаран; Bashkir: Сыбыҡаран, Sıbıqaran) is a rural locality (a village) in Slakbashevsky Selsoviet, Belebeyevsky District, Bashkortostan, Russia. The population was 25 as of 2010.

== Geography ==
It is located 35 km from Belebey and 10 km from Slakbash.
