= Praski Vitti =

Russian painter (1936–2026)

- Праски Витти
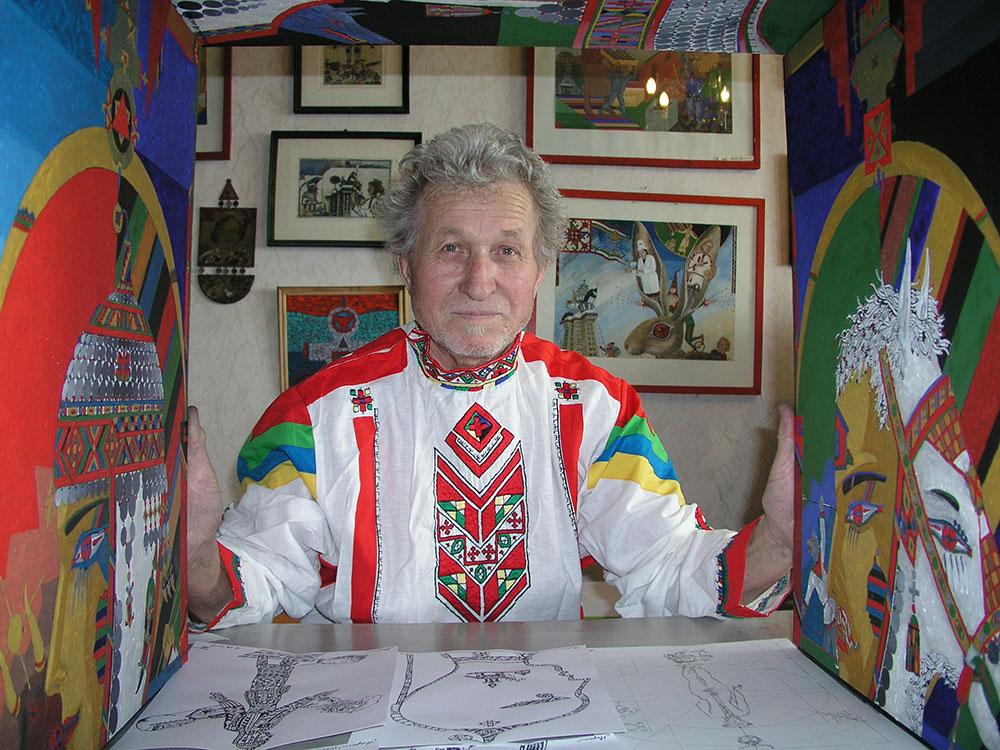
- Vitti in 2016
- Born: 17 September 1936; Algazino, Vurnarsky District, Chuvash ASSR, Russian SFSR, USSR
- Died: 30 January 2026 (aged 89)
- Education: Leningrad Higher School of Industrial Art
- Known for: Painting
- Awards: Honored artist of the RSFSR, People's Artist of the Chuvash Republic

Praski Vitti (Chuvash and Russian: Праски Витти, born Vitaly Petrovich Petrov, Виталий Петрович Петров; 17 September 1936 – 30 January 2026) was a Russian Chuvash artist, painter, and muralist.

As well as being an honored artist of the RSFSR, he also held the People's Artist of the Chuvash Republic, Member of the National Academy of Sciences and Arts of the Chuvash Republic, Laureate of State Prize of the Chuvash Republic of the Peter Egorov, and Professor at Chuvash State Pedagogical University.

== Life and career ==
Vitaly Petrov was born on 17 September 1936, as Petrol Vitaly Petrovich in Algazino, a village of the Vurnarsky District of the Chuvash Autonomous Soviet Socialist Republic (USSR).

He experienced many hardships during his time with the military, and he starved, worked in the rear to the front.

Vitti was educated at the Cheboksary Art School, then went to study at the Vera Mukhina Higher School of Art and Design.

He illustrated pearl Chuvash literature – a poem by Konstantin Ivanov. Vitti also illustrated the poems of the poet Andrei Voznesensky.

Vitti died on 30 January 2026, at the age of 89.

== Participation in exhibitions ==
From the mid-1970s, Vitti had works exhibited in the German Democratic Republic, Bulgaria, Hungary, Poland, Spain, United States, West Germany, India, Japan, and Turkey.

His works are kept in museums and private collections around the world.

=== Personal exhibitions ===
- 1984, 1987, 1993, 1996 «Graphic poetry» – Chuvash State Art Museum (Cheboksary)
- 1990 «K. Ivanov’s World Poetry» (Moscow)
- 1993, 1996 – Showroom, Novocheboksarsk
- 1995 «Finding new homeland Hungarians» – Chuvash State Institute of Humanities (Cheboksary)
- 2011 – Chuvash State Art Museum (Cheboksary)

=== Participation in exhibitions ===
- II International Exhibition of enamel art (Moscow, 1991)
- International Exhibition of enamels (Covington, Kentucky, United States, 1991)
- International creative center enamel (Kecskemet, Hungary)
- Enamels and exhibition graphics (Budapest, 1992)
- Berlin (1993, 1994, 1996, 1998)
- International Exhibition (Yaroslavl, 1995), St. Petersburg (1995), Peterhof (1995)
- Tokyo (1996)
- Moscow (1997)
- Paris (1999)
- Troyes (France, 2002)
- Barcelona (Spain, 2002)

== Awards and honors ==
- The first prize of the international creative center enamel (Kecskemet, Hungary)
- Diploma of the International Exhibition in Salou (Spain)
- Chuvashia State Prize of the Peter Egorov
- Diploma III Moscow international exhibition of enamel art
- Award of the President of the Russian Federation in the field of literature and art
- Order of Friendship

== Literature ==
- Davydov–Anatri, V., "Тавах Праски Виттине", Хыпар. – 1997, кӑрлач, 29.
- Zorsky, Kh. "Халӑх сӑнарӗ – илем ҫутинче", Ялав. – 1996. – No. 5. – С. 93.
- Krasnov, V., "Чӑваша тӗнчене каларакан", Тӑван Атӑл, 1997. – No. 9. – С. 67.
- Kuzmin, V., "Праски Витти кӗвви", Хыпар. – 1996. – юпа, 3.
- Praski, V. «Анне портречӗ – Барселонӑра, Хыпар. – 1997, кӑрлач, 30.
- Praski, V. "Саккӑрмӗш хут пулчӗ", Н. Смирнова ҫырса илнӗ, Хыпар. – 1998, ҫурла, 19.
- Praski, V. «Юлнӑ кунсене халӑхӑмӑршӑн ирттерӗп», Хыпар. – 1996, авӑн, 7.
- Semenov, A., "Германи посольствинче – Праски Витти ӗҫӗсем", Хыпар, 1997, нарӑс, 1.
- Smirnova, N., "Праски Витти Турцирен тавранчӗ", Хыпар, 1999, ҫӗртме, 8.
- Tevetkel, M., "Праски Витти художнике саламласа ҫырнӑ шӳт,Ҫамрӑксен хаҫачӗ, 1997, авӑн, 27 (№ 39). – С. 8.
- Aleksin, V. Испанский дебют чувашского мастера / В. Алексин // Совет. Чувашия. – 1997. – 6 авг.
- Aleksin, V. Париж, конечно, не Чандрово, но и там говорят по–чувашски / В. Алексин // Совет. Чувашия. – 1999. – 30 дек.
- Arapov, V. Выставка, радующая всех нас / В. Арапов // Чӑваш ен. – 1996. – 30 нояб. – 7 дек. (№ 47). – С. 8.
- Viktorov, Y. Колесо – символ вечного движения / Ю. Викторов // Совет. Чувашия. – 1995. – 15 дек.
- Viktorov, Y. Обжигающая кисть / Ю. Викторов // Совет. Чувашия. – 1993. – 23 апр.
- Gordeeva, S. Модель мира в работах художника / С. Гордеева // Чӑваш ен. – 1997. – 12–19 июля (№ 28). – С. 4.
- Егоров, А. Праски Вити рисует жаркие стихи / А. Егоров // Жизнь. – 2001. – 24–30 июля (№ 30). – С. 16.
- Испанские «каникулы» художника // Республика. – 2003. – 13 авг. (No. 32). – С. 5.
- Макшанова, Е. Картины, на которых оживают легенды / Е. Макшанова // Чебоксар. новости. – 1994. – 22 дек.
- Он и в Венгрии свой человек // Совет. Чувашия. – 2004. – 12 марта.
- Осипова, Н. Чувашский народный художник получил международную премию / Н. Осипова // Чӑваш ен. – 1999. – 31 июля –7 авг. (No. 30). – С. 1.
- Праски, В. В Кечкемете, на волнах вдохновения, Республика. – 2003. – 29 окт. (No. 43). – С. 6.
- Праски, В. «Я рисую канонический образ чувашей...», Современ. Чувашия. – 2004. – 25 нояб. – С. 1, 4.
- Праски, В. По национальности – художник, Республика. – 2000. – 1 сент. (No. 35). – С. 4.
- Праски, В. «Теперь уж – настоящий художник»; беседовала И. Пушкина // Ульяновец. – 2000. – 14 янв.
- Трофимов, А. Древо большого искусства, Совет. Чувашия. – 1986. – 17 сент.
- Тьваш, М. Праски Витти – художник и ученый, Молодеж. курьер. – 1996. – 13 сент. (No. 37). – С. 12.
- Убасси, С. Уход в символ, Лик Чувашии. – 1994. – No. 3. – С. 147.
- Шамбулина, А. Праски Витти : «В семье никогда не видел обмана и грубости...» / А. Шамбулина // Ульяновец. – 2001. – 7 июня.
