= Yanshikhovo-Norvashi =

Human settlement in Yantikovsky District, Chuvash Republic, Russia

Coordinates: 55°34′58″N 47°35′49″E

Yanshikhovo-Norvashi (Russian: Яншихово-Норваши; Chuvash: Енĕш Нăрваш, Yenĕş Nărvaş) is a rural locality (a selo) in Yantikovsky District of the Chuvash Republic, Russia.

== History ==
Based on the archival documents, it is known that the village of Yanshikhovo-Norvashi was founded in 1565 by three Chuvash people named Yanshikh, Akhmet, and Kibyat, who moved here from the village of Timyash (former name of Yantikovo). The village was named after Yanshikh (one of the founders), and the "Norvashi" part refers to the Norvashka River on which the village stands.

As the village grew, some of its residents moved out to found new villages in what is now Yalchiksky District.

In 1898, a church was built in the village, which was funded by the parishioners and Andrey Astrakhantsev—a merchant from Cheboksary. The first church priest was Nikolay Sidorov, who ran the church with the help of Fyodor Dyakov, a psalm reader who graduated from the rural school.

== See also ==
- Vera Kuzmina — People's Artist of the USSR (1980). Laureate of the State Prize of the Chuvash ASSR named after K. V. Ivanov (1991) and the Russian National Theater Award "Golden Mask" (2018). Honorary Citizen of the Chuvash Republic (2003).
