= Teneyevo =

Name of several Russian rural localities

Teneyevo (Russian: Тенеево) is the name of several rural localities in Russia:

- Teneyevo, Alikovsky District, Chuvash Republic, a selo in Teneyevskoye Rural Settlement of Alikovsky District of the Chuvash Republic
- Teneyevo, Yantikovsky District, Chuvash Republic, a village in Indyrchskoye Rural Settlement of Yantikovsky District of the Chuvash Republic
- Teneyevo, Samara Oblast, a selo in Koshkinsky District of Samara Oblast
