= Azimsirminskoye =

Azimsirminskoye rural locality (Chuvash Аçăм Çырми ял тăрăхĕ) is a municipality in the north-western part of Vurnarsky district of Chuvashia.

The administrative center is the village of Azim Sirma. The head is Oleg Petrov.

== Villages ==
The population is approximately 2,140 people.

It consists of the villages of Asmolovo, Solonushkinskoye Seltso, Yupshikovo, Yelkasskoye seltso, Omutninsky ravine, Bolshoe seltso, Bor, Paikovo, Maltasovo seltso, Gribovo, Uykasovo seltso, Bolshoe seltso.

== See also ==
Vurnarsky District
