= Valerie Tourgay =

Chuvash poet, novelist, translator and journalist (born 1961)

- Born: Valerie Vladimirovich Vorobiev; 17 April 1961 village Pochinok-Ineli, Komsomolsky District, Chuvash Republic, USSR
- Died: 22 September 2014 (aged 82) village Alikovo, Alikovsky District, Chuvash Republic, Russia
- Occupations: writer and poet
- Writing career
- Language: Chuvash, Russian
- Period: 1977–pres.
- Notable works: My soul, my soul (2003); It's me (2013)

Valerie Tourgay (Vorobyov; Russian: Валерий Владимирович Тургай (Воробьёв); born April 17, 1961, Pochinok-Ineli (Chuvash: Хырай Ĕнел), Komsomolsky District, Chuvash ASSR, USSR) is a Chuvash poet, novelist, translator, and journalist.

National Poet of the Chuvash Republic (2003), member of the Union of Soviet Writers (1991), Chairman of the Chuvash Republican Public Charitable Foundation M. Sespel (after 1996).

== Biography ==
The future poet was born April 17, 1961, in the village of Pochinok-Ineli, Komsomolsky District of the Chuvash ASSR.

He received higher education at the Chuvash State University named after I. N. Ulyanov, in the Higher Theater Courses at the A.V. Lunacharsky GITIS.

He received higher education at the Chuvash State University named after I. N. Ulyanov, in the Higher Theater Courses at the A.V. Lunacharsky GITIS.

== Works ==
- «Шурӑ фарфӑр чашӑк»/ "White porcelain cup", Poem, Cheboksary, 1994.
- «Чунӑм манӑн, чунӑм…» / "My soul, my soul", Poem, Cheboksary, 2003
- «Ночь-мелодия» / "Night-melody", Poem, Cheboksary, 2004.
- «Моя бунтарская карма»/ "My rebellious Karma", articles, interviews, Cheboksary, 2011.
- «Ку эпӗ» /"It's Me" Poem, Cheboksary, 2013.

== Literature ==
- Валери Туркай. Чӑваш халӑх поэчӗ : [буклет]. — Шупашкар : [и. ҫ.], 2013. — 1 с.
- Туркай, В. Пурнатпӑр-ха! : чӑваш халӑх поэчӗ Валери Туркай = Будем жить! : народный поэт Чувашии Валери Тургай / [В. Туркай]; Николай Григорьев [пухса хатӗрленӗ]. — Чебоксары : [Новое Время], 2012. — 409 с.
- Тургай Валерий Владимирович, народный поэт Чувашии [Электронный ресурс] : [интервью с народным поэтом Чувашии Валери Тургаем]. — Электрон. текстовые дан. — [Б. м.] : Персональный сайт, 2011. Режим доступа : http://mosentesh2.ucoz.ru/publ/valerij_turgaj_poeht/1-1-0-482.
- Данилова, Л. Утăм хыççан утăм / Л. Данилова // Ялав. — 2005. No. 3.
- Зайцева, В. Салам сана, Турӑ кайӑкӗ! / В. Зайцева // Каçал ен. — 2011. — 16 апрель (No. 42/43).
- Кузнецова, В. Мĕнпе илӗртет В. Туркай / В. Кузнецова // Çамрăксен хаçачĕ. — 2000. — юпа (No. 40).
- Кузнецова, В. Туркай поэзийĕ тата вулакан / В. Кузнецова // Тăван Атăл. — 2000. — No. 9.
- Метин, П. Поэзи тӗнчи — тӗпсӗр авӑр / П. Метин // Тӑван Атӑл. — 2011. — No. 4.
- Прокопьева, Р. Чӑваш халӑх поэчӗн портретне кам ӳкернӗ-ши? / Р. Прокопьева // Самант. — 2011. — No. 5. — С. 18.
- Смирнова, Н. Халӑхсен «ылтӑн пӗрчипе» пуянланнӑ кӗнеке / Н. Смирнова; В. Кузьмин сӑн ӳкерчӗкӗ // Хыпар. — 2015. — 28 январь/кӑрлач. — С. 2.
- Теветкел, Н. «Пришибаев унтера хирĕç кар тăнă унтерсем» ярăмран: [Валери Туркай поэтăн творчестви пирки] / Н. Теветкел // Çамрăксен хаçачĕ. — 2005. — 11 нарăс (No. 5); 18 нарăс (No. 6).
- Тургай, В. В. «Туркай та тӗрлӗрен пурнать…», Самант, 2007, No. 3.
- Афанасьев, П. Тургай Валери (Тургай Валерий Владимирович), Писатели Чувашии, Чебоксары, 2006.
- Вадимов, В. Наш человек в «Дружбе народов» / В. Вадимов // Совет. Чувашия. — 2007. — 20 дек. — С. 6-15.
- Матвеева, Г. Дагестан далекий и близкий / Г. Матвеева // Совет. Чувашия. — 2006. — 16 сент
- Семенндер, Ю. С. Валерий Владимирович Тургай: 1961. На новой волне, Писатели. — Чебоксары, 2008.
- Тимуков, А. Н. Тургай Валери / А. Н. Тимуков, Краткая чувашская энциклопедия, Чебоксары, 2001.
- Тургай (Воробьев) Валерий Владимирович, Энциклопедия Комсомольского района, Чебоксары, 2009.
- Тургай (Воробьев) Валерий Владимирович, Энциклопедия чувашской журналистики и печати, Чебоксары, 2014.
- «Хыпар» возглавит Валерий Тургай : [о назначении на должность главного редактора АУ "Издательский дом «Хыпар» Валерия Тургая], Совет. Чувашия (гахета), 2014, 25 октября.
- Ялгир, П. Тургай Валерий Владимирович, Литературный мир Чувашии, Чебоксары, 2005.
