= Takhti (surname) =

Takhti or Tahti a surname. Notable people with the surname include:

- Annikki Tähti (1929-2017), Finnish singer
- Gholamreza Takhti (1930–1968), Iranian wrestler
- Ille Takhti (1889–1938), Russian Chuvash writer and folklorist
- Jouni Tähti (born 1968), Finnish disabled pool player
- Leo-Pekka Tähti (born 1983), Finnish Paralympian athlete
