= Alshikhovo =

Rural locality in Ibresinsky District, Russia

Coordinates: 55°23′N 47°12′E

Alshikhovo (Russian: Алшихово; Chuvash: Алшик, Alşik) is a rural locality (a settlement) in Ibresinsky District of the Chuvash Republic, Russia, located 113 kilometers (70 mi) from Cheboksary and 18 kilometers (11 mi) from Ibresi, the administrative center of the district.

The settlement is situated on the Shurlakhvar river and is surrounded by forests.

The settlement's history goes back to 1928, when the first house was built here. The first official mention of the village is dated August 29, 1931, and the settlement status was granted to it in 1940.

The population was 40 inhabitants in 1989 and 30 inhabitants in 2006.

== Etymology ==
According to the local legend, the village was named after Alshikh, the person who founded the village. It is also possible that the village was named after a village of the same name in Tatarstan.
