= Fedor Madurov =

Russian sculptor and graphic artist (1942–2022)

- Born: 24 April 1942; Baskaki, Shemurshinsky District, Chuvash ASSR, RSFSR, USSR
- Died: 20 February 2022 (aged 79)
- Occupation(s): Sculptor and graphic artist

Fedor Ivanovich Madurov (Russian: Фёдор Иванович Мадуров; 24 April 1942 – 20 February 2022) was a Russian sculptor and graphic artist. He died on February 20, 2022, at the age of 79.
