= Viktor Nemtsev =

Chuvash painter

- Born: Виктор Леонтьевич Немцев; January 16, 1936; Chuvash ASSR, USSR
- Died: November 9, 2018 (aged 82); Cheboksary, Chuvash Republic
- Known for: Painting
- Movement: Realism
- Awards: Badge of Honour

Viktor Nemtsev (January 16, 1936 - November 9, 2018) was a Chuvash painter, a member of the Union of Artists of the USSR (1967). He was born in the village of Votlany, Komsomol district, Chuvash ASSR, and died in Cheboksary, Chuvash Republic.

== Early life ==
In 1959, Nemtsev graduated from Cheboksary art school, and later the Chuvash State Pedagogical Institute in 1970. From 1961 to 1966, he worked as the headteacher of the Cheboksary Children's Art School No. 1.

== Career ==
After 1971, he participated in the work of the creative team "Rural Dawns". From 1991 to 1993, he was head of the creative team "Ibresionisty" and prepared an exhibition of works for the 100th anniversary of the Ibresi village (1993).

Nemtsev's paintings included portraiture, landscape and still lives.

He died in Cheboksary on November 9, 2018.

== Notable works ==
Nemtsev's works include:

- "Red house" (1962), "Anniversary" (1967)
- Series of Northern studies (1967–68)
- "Chuvash still life" (1969), "My homeland" (1971)
- "Chuvash antiquity" (1973)
- "Still Life with khushpu" (1974)
- "Greener ravines" (1975)
- "River Vurnarka. The first green" (1976)
- "viburnum red" (1983)
- series of portraits of contemporaries (1976–91)
- "Participant of the Civil war P. p. Chudikov" (1978)
- "Mower Kuzma Nikitin "(1980)
- "IRH-Sirmy-Cats – homeland Yu.a. Zaitsev "(1990)
- "October "(1996)
- "Evdokia Grandmother’s autumn " (2003).

== Recognition ==
- K. V. Ivanov prize of the Chuvash ASSR (1980)
- Order of the Badge of Honour
- Master of Sport of the USSR in power acrobatics (1965).
- Honored Artist of Chuvash. ASSR (1976)
- People's Artist of Chuvash. Rep. (1993)

== Literature ==
- Егоров, А. Илемлӗхпе лайӑх кӑмӑл ӑсти / А. Егоров // Пике. – 1996. – No. 3–4. – С. 30–32.
- Журавлев, С. Австри нимӗҫӗн йӑхӗнчен / С. Журавлев // Ар. – 2002. – 15–21 юпа.
- Карягина, М. Ыралма, тасалма. Чиркӗве кайнӑ пек / М. Карягина // Тантӑш. – 1996. – 26 кӑрлач (No. 5). – С. 8.
- Москвин, В. "Ӳкерчӗксенче – чӑваш тавралӑхӗ / В. Москвин // Каҫал ен (Комсомольски р–нӗ). – 2000. – 12 кӑрлач.
- Немцев, В. Виктор Немцев : «Манӑн картинӑсенче – тӗнче» / В. Немцев ; Н. Петровский сыр. ил. // Сентер-шен (Йепрес р–не). – 1993. – 22 июль.
- Немцев, В. Виктор Немцев : «Манӑн картинӑсенче – ҫӗршыв тӗкӗрӗ»/ В. Немцев ; Н. Петровский сыр. ил. // Тантӑш. – 1993. – 10 июль (No. 5). – С. 4.
- Смирнова, Н. Кӑрлач сиввинчи ҫуркунне / Н. Смирнова // Хыпар. —1996. – 18 кӑрлач.
- Ургалкина, Н. Виктор Немцев / Н. Ургалкина // Тӑван Атӑл. – 1986. – No. 5. – С. 72.
- Акташ, Т. Певец родного края / Т. Акташ // Совет. Чувашия. – 1997. – 11 июня. – С. 3.
- Викторов, Ю. Доброта чувств и оптимизм / Ю. Викторов // Правительств. вестн. – 1996. – 31 янв. (No. 5). – С. 6.
- Викторов, Ю. Надо съесть пуд соли / Ю. Викторов // Совет. Чувашия. – 1993. – 10 марта.
- Григорьев, А. Г. Немцев Виктор Леонтьевич / А. Григорьев // Краткая чувашская энциклопедия. – Чебоксары, 2001. – С. 291.
- Долгов, В. К Виктору Немцеву – «на огонек» / В. Долгов // Чебоксар. новости. – 1997. – 8 июля.
- Егорова, А. Пейзаж с бликами на воде / А. Егорова // Чебоксар. новости. – 1996. – 29 марта.
- Жирнов, Н. Т. Немцев Виктор Леонтьевич / Н. Т. Жирнов, В. Н. Жирнов // Ибресинский район / Н. Т. Жирнов, В. Н. Жирнов. – Чебоксары, 2004. – С. 110.
- Золотов, В. Поймать мгновение! / В. Золотов // Время. – 1997. – 28 июня.
- Золотов, В. Пора многоцветия и контрастов / В. Золотов // Совет. Чувашия. – 1997. – 4 июля.
- Ивлев, Д. Выдающийся художник страны Чувашской / Д. Ивлев // Чӑваш ен. – 1997. – 5–16 янв. (No. 1). – С. 2.
- Ивлев, Д. Д. Поэзия Виктора Немцева / Д. Д. Ивлев // Короли и академики / Д. Д. Ивлев. – Чебоксары, 1999. – С. 30–31.
- Летние закаты Виктора Немцева // Чебоксар. новости. – 1997. – 7 июня.
- Немцев, В. Виктор Немцев, каков он есть.../ В. Немцев ; записала E. Канюка // Чебоксар. новости. – 1998. – 16 дек.
- Немцев, В. «На этюд выходишь, как на бой!» / В. Немцев ; записала А. Егорова // Чебоксар. новости. – 1996. – 20 янв.
- Немцев, В. «Сбить наледь равнодушия с сердец» / В. Немцев ; беседовал В. Овчаров // Чебоксар. правда. – 2000. – 3 авг.
- Петрова, Н. Навернулись слезы / Н. Петрова // Совет. Чувашия. – 1997. – 18 июня.
- Петровский–Теветкель, Н. Золотая осень народного художника Чувашии Виктора Немцева / Н. * Петровский–Теветкель // Чаваш ен. – 1998. – 31 окт. –7 нояб. (No. 43). – С. 8.
- Соловьев, В. «Цветок среди цветов» / В. Соловьев // Чебоксар. новости. – 1996. – 9 апр.
- Теветкель, Н. Многоцветье чувашского пейзажиста / Н. Теветкель // Республика. – 2001. – 19 дек. (No. 101–102). – С. 7.
- Теветкель, Н. Таинство цветов / Н. Теветкель // Совет. Чувашия. – 2004. – 18 февр.
