= Algazino =

Algazino Алгазино Малти Ишек
- Village
- Location within Russia
- Coordinates: 55°35′50″N 46°56′36″E
- Country: Russia
- Chuvashia: Vurnarsky District
- Population (2006): 517
- Time zone: UTC+4 (EET)
  - Summer (DST): UTC+4 (EEST)

Algazino (Russian: Алгазино; Chuvash: Малти Ишек, Malti İşek) is a rural locality (a village) in Vurnarsky District of the Chuvash Republic, (Russia). The village is the administrative center of Algazinskoye Rural Settlement, one of the municipal formations of Vurnarsky District.

The chief of the rural formation is Igor A. Ivanov.

== Notable people ==
- Praski Vitti, chuvash painter
