= Takhti Stadium =

Takhti Stadium (Persian: استاديوم تختی) is the name of several facilities named in honour of Iranian wrestler Gholamreza Takhti:

- Takhti Stadium (Abadan)
- Takhti Stadium (Ahvaz)
- Takhti Stadium (Anzali), home ground of Malavan F.C.
- Takhti Stadium (Ardabil)
- Takhti Stadium (Bandar Abbas)
- Takhti Stadium (Dorood), home ground of Gahar Zagros F.C.
- Takhti Stadium (Jam)
- Takhti Stadium (Khorramabad)
- Takhti Stadium (Mashhad)
- Takhti Stadium (Tabriz)
- Takhti Stadium (Tehran)
- Takhti Stadium (Yasuj), home ground of Shahrdari Yasuj F.C.
- Takhti Stadium (Ilam), home ground of Palayesh Gaz Ilam W.F.C. and Tarbiat Ilam F.C.
