= Arabosi =

Rural locality in Urmarsky District, Russia

Coordinates: 55°38′43″N 47°54′22″E

Arabosi (Russian: Ара́боси; Chuvash: Арапуҫ, Arapuś) is a rural locality (a village) in Urmarsky District of the Chuvash Republic, Russia, located on the Arya River. Postal code: 429403.
