= Azim Sirma =

Azim Sirma Азим-Сирма Аçăм-Çырми
- Village
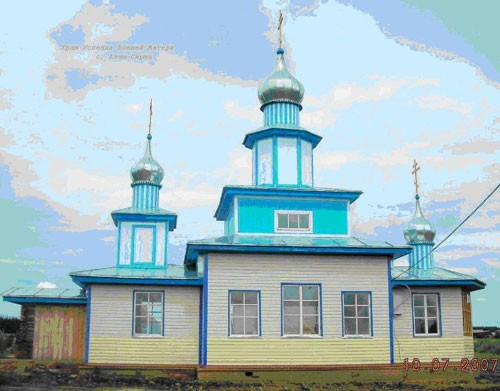
- Our Lady of Assumption church in Azim Sirma

- Location within Russia
- Coordinates: 55°36′54″N 46°44′44″E
- Country: Russia
- Chuvashia: Vurnarsky District
- Population (2012): 429
- Time zone: UTC+4 (EET)
  - Summer (DST): UTC+4 (EEST)

Azim Sirma (Russian: Азим-Сирма; Chuvash: Аçăм Çырми, Aśăm Śırmi) is a rural locality (a village) in Vurnarsky District of the Chuvash Republic, (Russia). The village is located at 65 kmetres from the capital Cheboksari.

== Architecture and monuments ==
Our Lady of Assumption church; built in 2005 by the monk Vadim (born Valery Smirnov) and consecrated in 2007. After father's Vadim death, father Alexis Belov was elected abbot of the church.
