= Shemursha, Chuvash Republic =

Rural locality in Chuvashia, Russia

Coordinates: 54°53′13″N 47°31′09″E

Shemursha (Russian: Шемурша́, Chuvash: Шăмăршă, Şămărşă) is a rural locality (a selo) and the administrative center of Shemurshinsky District of the Chuvash Republic, Russia. Population: 3,759 (2010 census); 3,726 (2002 census); 3,700 (1989 Soviet census).
