= Ille Takhti =

- Born: Efimov Ilya Efimovich; September 4, 1889 village Nüškassi, Kazan Governorate (today Yantikovsky District, Chuvash Republic, Russia
- Died: February 22, 1938 (aged 48); Cheboksary, Chuvash Republic, USSR
- Occupations: Writer, poet, folklorist
- Writing career
- Pen name: Ille Takhti
- Language: Chuvash
- Period: 1919–1938
- Notable works: Kolchak (1919); Shekhulla (1936)

Ille Tăhti (Chuvash: Илле Тӑхти; September 4, 1889 – February 22, 1938) is a Chuvash writer and folklorist, and a member of USSR Union of Writers starting in 1934.

== Early life ==
Ille Tăhti was born on September 4, 1889, in the Nüškassi village of the Yantikovsky District of the Chuvash Republic.

He graduated from a rural school and moved into a Kazan teacher's seminary. There he earned the rank of teacher and worked at Tautovo High School in Alikovsky District.

== Career ==
Tăhti collected national songs and verses. In 1911, he published a collection in Kazan in 2 volumes: Tavat, Melesh, Shuras songs and Shuras.

In 1922–1925 served as inspector Narkomprosa of the Chuvash ASSR.

In 1925–1928 he studied at the Moscow Literary Institute, while working in the editorial offices of the magazine Ӗҫлекенсен сасси (A voice of workers) and newspapers Chuvash peasant (later the Kommunar newspaper).

In 1928–1931 Takhti taught Chuvash language and literature in Cheboksary pedagogical technical school.

In 1931–1938 he worked as a writer.

== Publications ==
The author creates both prose and poetry. His works are publishing in magazines «Тӑван Атӑл» (Own Atăl), «Ялав» (Banner), newspapers.

He have published 10 books:

- «Колчак» – Kolchak (1919; 1935),
- «Калавсемпе сӑвӑсем» – Stories and Verses (1930),
- «Шехулла» – Shekhulla (1936),
- «Калавсем» – Stories (1955),
- «Суйласа илнисем» – Selected (1960),
- «Поэзи, проза, публицистика» – Poetry, Prose, Opinion Journalism (1979).

== Literature ==
- «Чӑваш литературин антологийӗ» (Anthology of Chuvash Literature), editors: D. V. Gordeev, J. A. Silem. Cheboksary, 2003. ISBN 5-7670-1279-2.
- Irina Y. Kirillova, "Своеобразие художественного мира Илле Тӑхти", CSU, Cheboksary, 2006.

== Death ==
He died in Cheboksary hospital following a longtime lung illness, on February 22, 1938.
