= Godar Takhti =

Godar Takhti گدارتختي
- Village
- Location within Iran
- Coordinates: 30°59′00″N 50°02′24″E
- Country: Iran
- Province: Kohgiluyeh and Boyer-Ahmad
- County: Bahmai
- Bakhsh: Central
- Rural District: Bahmai-ye Garmsiri-ye Jonubi

Population (2006)
  - Total: 482
- Time zone: UTC+3:30 (IRST)
  - Summer (DST): UTC+4:30 (IRDT)

Godar Takhti (Persian: گدارتختي, also Romanized as Godār Takhtī) is a village in Bahmai-ye Garmsiri-ye Jonubi Rural District, in the Central District of Bahmai County, Kohgiluyeh and Boyer-Ahmad Province, Iran. At the 2006 census, its population was 482, in 80 families.
