= Sespel =

Human settlement in Kanashsky District, Chuvash Republic, Russia

Coordinates: 55°36′20″N 47°17′48″E

Sespel (Russian: Сеспель; Chuvash: Çеçпĕл, Śeśpĕl) is a rural locality (a village) and the administrative center of Sespelskoye Rural Settlement of Kanashsky District in the Chuvash Republic, Russia. It is located 15 kilometers (9.3 mi) west of Kanash, the administrative center of the district. Population: 567 (2006 est.).

== Climate ==
The climate is moderately continental, with long cold winters and warm summers. Average January temperature is −12.9 °C (8.8 °F); average July temperature is +18.3 °C (64.9 °F). Record low of −44 °C (−47 °F) was recorded in 1979, and the record high was +37 °C (99 °F). Average annual precipitation is up to 552 millimeters (21.7 in).

== Infrastructure ==
The facilities in Sespel include a club, a library, a first-aid post, and a store.

== Notable people ==
- Mišši Şeşpĕl (1899–1922), Chuvash poet
