= Yadrinsky District =

Yadrinsky District Ядринский район (Russian)
- District

Other transcription(s)
  - Chuvash: Eтĕрне районӗ
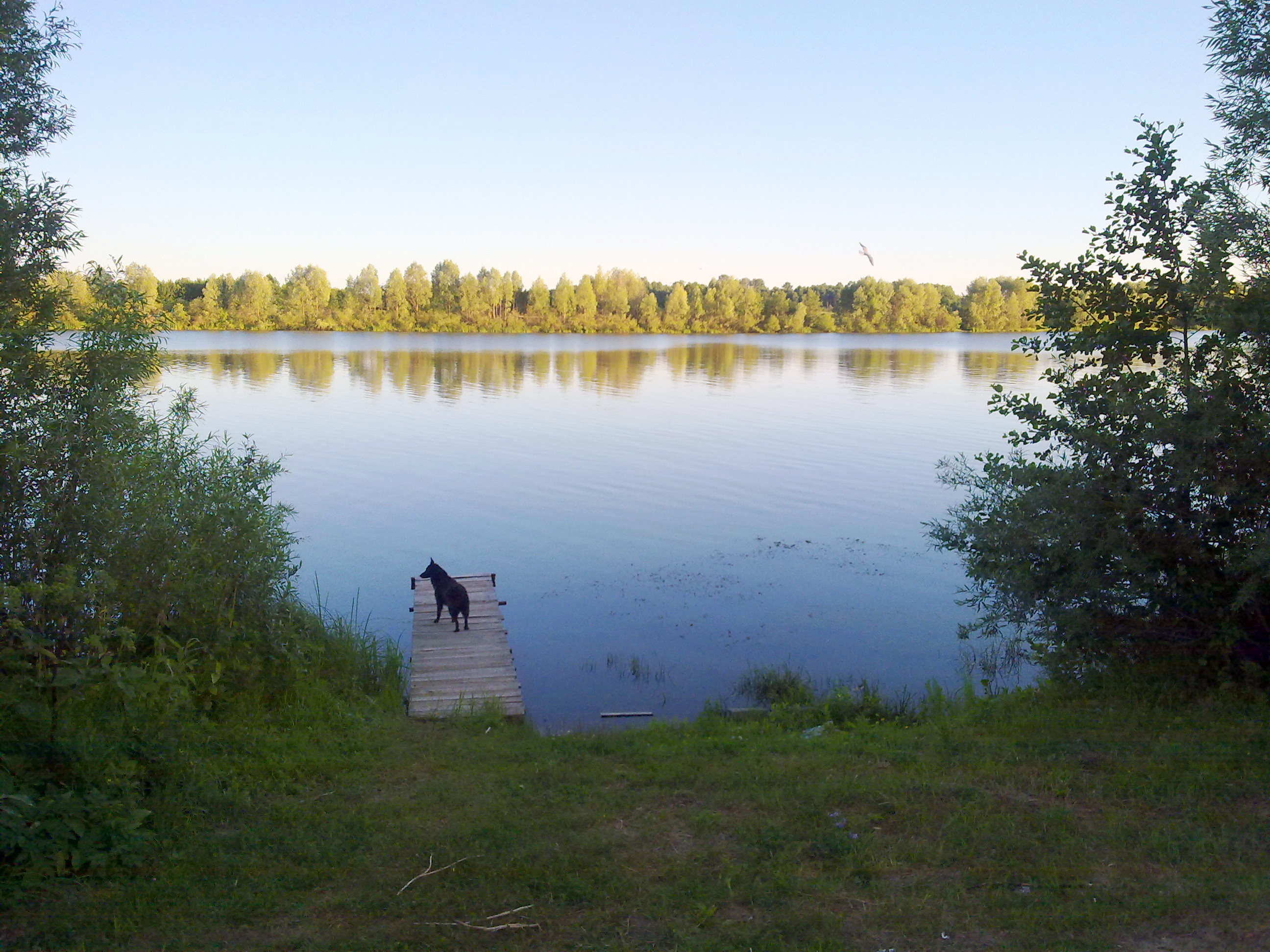
- Sura River, in Yadrinsky District

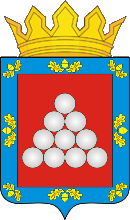
- Flag Coat of arms
- Location of Yadrinsky District in the Chuvash Republic
- Coordinates: 55.597°N 46.356°E
- Country: Russia
- Federal subject: Chuvash Republic
- Established: September 5, 1927
- Administrative center: Yadrin

Area
  - Total: 897.5 km^{2} (346.5 sq mi)

Population (2010 Census)
  - Total: 29,965
  - Density: 33.39/km^{2} (86.47/sq mi)
  - Urban: 32.1%
  - Rural: 67.9%

Administrative structure
  - Administrative divisions: 1 Urban settlements, 17 Rural settlements
  - Inhabited localities: 1 cities/towns, 125 rural localities

Municipal structure
  - Municipally incorporated as: Yadrinsky Municipal District
  - Municipal divisions: 1 urban settlements, 17 rural settlements
- Time zone: UTC+3 (MSK)
- OKTMO ID: 97553000
- Website: https://gov.cap.ru/main.asp?govid=78

Yadrinsky District (Russian: Я́дринский райо́н; Chuvash: Етĕрне районӗ, Yetĕrne rayonĕ) is an administrative and municipal district (raion), one of the twenty-one in the Chuvash Republic, Russia. It is located in the northwest of the republic and borders with the Mari El Republic in the north, Morgaushsky District in the east, Alikovsky and Krasnochetaysky Districts in the south, and with Nizhny Novgorod Oblast in the west. The area of the district is 897.5 square kilometers (346.5 sq mi). Its administrative center is the town of Yadrin. Population: 29,965 (2010 census); 34,456 (2002 census); 36,745 (1989 Soviet census). The population of Yadrin accounts for 32.1% of the district's total population.

== History ==
The district was established on September 5, 1927 with the merger of 5 municipalities ( Leninskaya, Baldaevskaya, Malokarachkinskaya, Toraevskaya and Shumatovskaya) and the city of Yadrin. The first head of the district was Alexander Ivanovich Markov.

== Government ==
The Mayor of the city - Andrey Vladimirovich Agakov (start 05.12.2011). The Deputy - Larisa Polikarpova.

== Demography ==
According to the 2010 Census, Chuvash make up 84% of the district population. Other groups include Russians (15%), and a host of smaller groups.

== Famous people ==
- Boris Cheendykov - writer, poet, translator
- Zinovy Talantsev, businessman, politician and public figure;
- Nikolay Ashmarin, Russian and Soviet linguist, Turkologist;
- Nikolay Mordvinov, artist.
- Alina Ivanova, athlete
