= Yantikovsky District =

Yantikovsky District Янтиковский район (Russian)
- District

Other transcription(s)
  - Chuvash: Тăвай районӗ
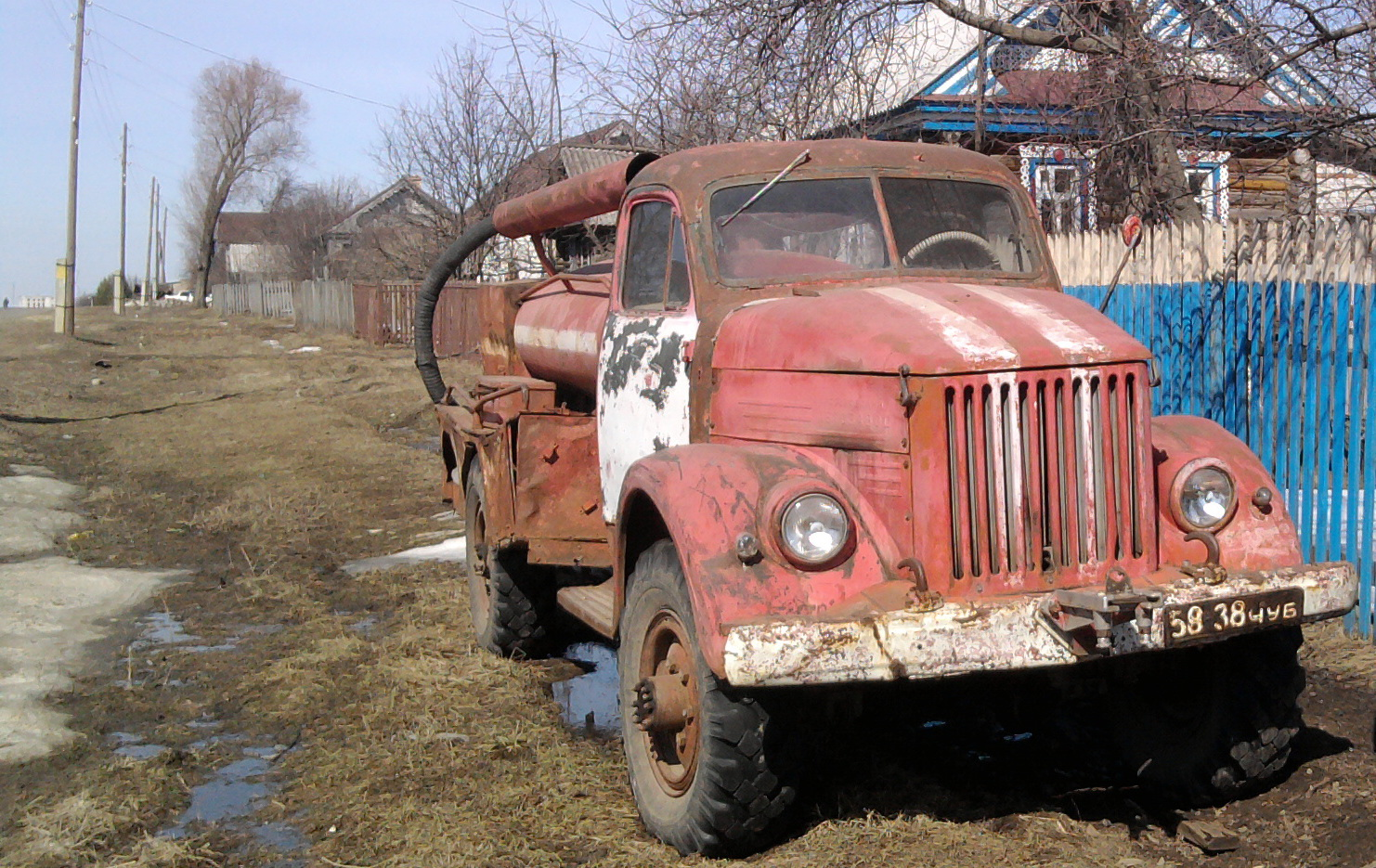
- GAZ-51 in the village Chuteevo, Yantikovsky District

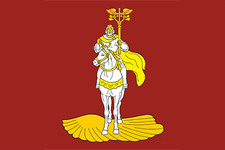
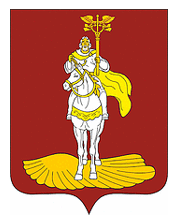
- Flag Coat of arms
- Location of Yantikovsky District in the Chuvash Republic
- Coordinates: 55°30′00″N 47°50′00″E
- Country: Russia
- Federal subject: Chuvash Republic
- Established: January 9, 1935
- Administrative center: Yantikovo

Area
  - Total: 524.4 km^{2} (202.5 sq mi)

Population (2010 Census)
  - Total: 16,421
  - Density: 31.31/km^{2} (81.10/sq mi)
  - Urban: 0%
  - Rural: 100%

Administrative structure
  - Administrative divisions: 10 rural settlement
  - Inhabited localities: 31 rural localities

Municipal structure
  - Municipally incorporated as: Yantikovsky Municipal District
  - Municipal divisions: 0 urban settlements, 10 rural settlements
- Time zone: UTC+3 (MSK)
- OKTMO ID: 97558000
- Website: http://gov.cap.ru/main.asp?govid=80

Yantikovsky District (Russian: Янтиковский райо́н; Chuvash: Тăвай районӗ, Tăvay rayonĕ) is an administrative and municipal district (raion), one of the twenty-one in the Chuvash Republic, Russia. It is located in the east of the republic and borders with the Republic of Tatarstan in the south and east, Kanashsky District in the west, and with Urmarsky District in the north. The area of the district is 524.4 square kilometers (202.5 sq mi). Its administrative center is the rural locality (a selo) of Yantikovo. Population: 16,421 (2010 census); 18,580 (2002 census); 20,017 (1989 Soviet census). The population of Yantikovo accounts for 19.2% of the district's total population.

== History ==
The district was formed on January 9, 1935.

== Demographics ==
Over 90% of the district's population is Chuvash.

== Notable people ==
- Vera Kuzmina (1923–2021), theatre actress, born in Yanshikhovo-Norvashi
- Ille Takhti (1889–1938), writer and folklorist, born in the village of Nüškassi

== See also ==
- Yanshikhovo-Norvashi
