= Takhti Khel =

Coordinates: 32°48′18″N 70°39′12″E

- Union Council (Group of villages of the Shahbaz Khel Clan of the Takhti Khel tribe)
- Nar Akbar Khan, Takhti Khel
- Interactive map of Takhti Khel
- Country: Pakistan
- Province: Khyber Pakhtunkhwa - KP (previously NWFP North-West Frontier Province)
- District: Lakki Marwat
- Tehsil: Sarai Naurang
- Founder: Takhti Khan s/o Musa khan
- Named for: Takhti Khan (Founder)
- Seat: House of Khan Bahadur Sher Ali Khan

Government
  - Type: Jirga
  - Body: Shahtora Takhti Khel
  - Chief: Khan Shamsullah Khan Takhti Khel (Jamiat Ulema-e-Islam (F))
  - Tribal Chief: Haji Khan Shamsullah Khan Takhti Khel (Father of Mufti Ziaullah, Emir JUI Sarai Naurang and Nephew of Ex. Chief Jamil Khan Takhti Khel)
- Demonym: Takhti Khel / Shahbaz Khel
- Time zone: UTC+5 (PST)
- Post office Nar Akbar Khan Takhti Khel: 28322
- Area code: 0969

Takhti Khel is a union council (and a group of villages of the Shahbaz Khel Clan, leading Clan/Tribe of the Takhti Khel Tribe of Marwat Tribe) of Sarai Naurang Tehsil in Lakki Marwat District in Khyber Pakhtunkhwa (previously known as NWFP North-West Frontier Province) province of Pakistan. It is located at 32°48'51.2"N 70°41'48.7"E and has an altitude of 292 meters (961 feet).

Takhti Khel lies close to the borders of North Waziristan, an area known for its rugged terrain and tribal significance. The village is part of the rural areas of Lakki Marwat, which is characterized by semi-arid conditions, vast plains, and hilly surroundings.

The area is inhabited by Pashtun tribes, majorly the Marwat tribe and which is also the largest in the region. Agriculture and livestock are common means of livelihood for the local population. Due to its strategic location, the village has a mix of cultural, tribal and political influences.
