= Poretskoye, Chuvash Republic =

Rural locality in Chuvashia, Russia

Coordinates: 55°11′47″N 46°19′42″E

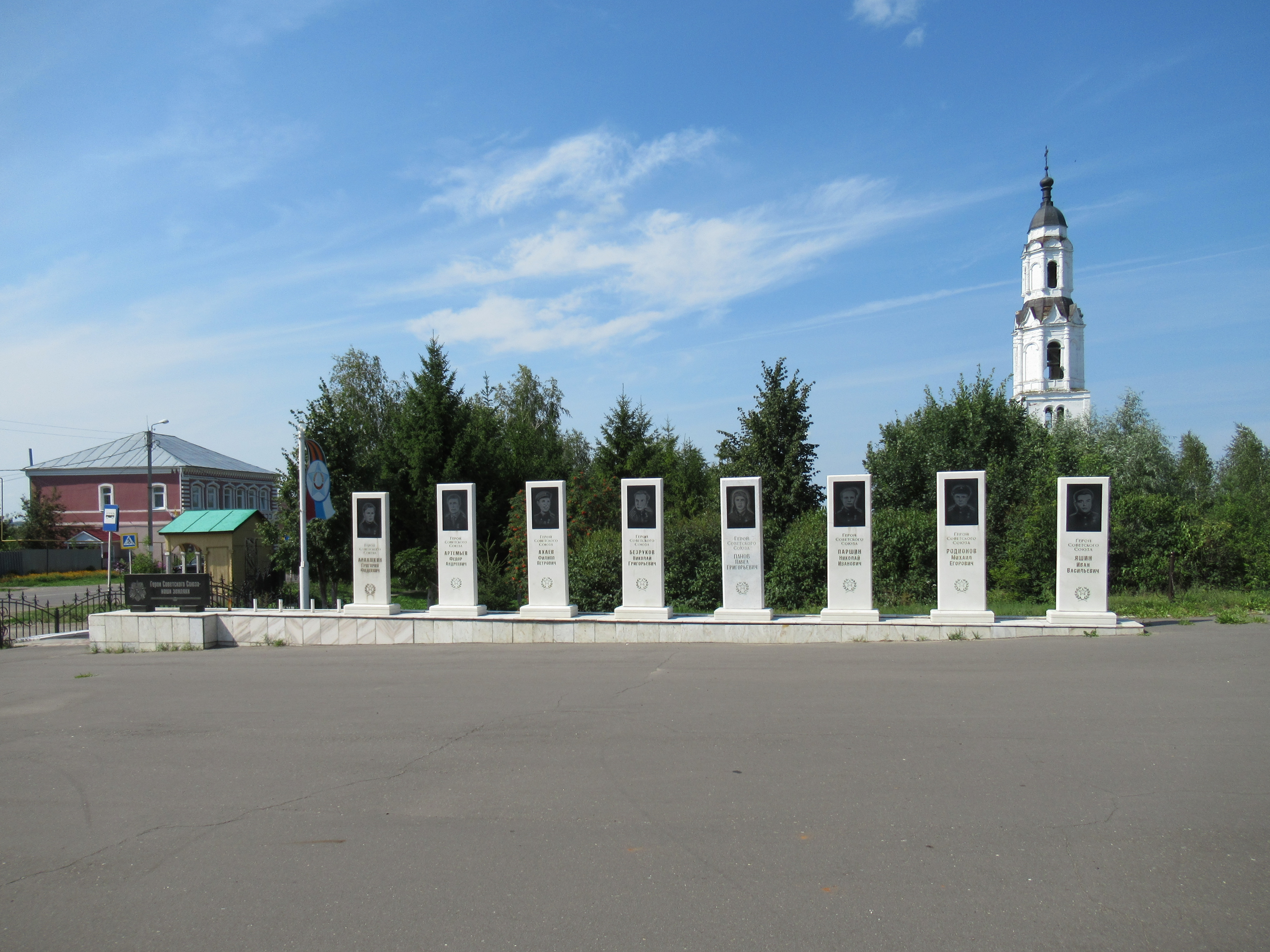
Bell tower on Komsomolskaya street

Poretskoye (Russian: Поре́цкое, Chuvash: Пăрачкав, Păraçkav) is a rural locality (a selo) and the administrative center of Poretsky District of the Chuvash Republic, Russia. Population: 5,825 (2010 census); 6,482 (2002 census); 6,602 (1989 Soviet census).

== Climate ==
Climate data for Poretskoye (extremes 1891-present)
Month	Jan	Feb	Mar	Apr	May	Jun	Jul	Aug	Sep	Oct	Nov	Dec	Year
Record high °C (°F)	6.1 (43.0)	6.2 (43.2)	16.6 (61.9)	29.9 (85.8)	34.1 (93.4)	37.4 (99.3)	40.0 (104.0)	40.4 (104.7)	32.2 (90.0)	25.0 (77.0)	16.1 (61.0)	7.2 (45.0)	40.4 (104.7)
Mean daily maximum °C (°F)	−6.3 (20.7)	−5.7 (21.7)	0.3 (32.5)	11.3 (52.3)	20.4 (68.7)	23.4 (74.1)	25.6 (78.1)	23.7 (74.7)	17.2 (63.0)	8.9 (48.0)	0.2 (32.4)	−4.8 (23.4)	9.5 (49.1)
Daily mean °C (°F)	−9.4 (15.1)	−9.4 (15.1)	−3.6 (25.5)	5.9 (42.6)	13.8 (56.8)	17.5 (63.5)	19.6 (67.3)	17.6 (63.7)	11.9 (53.4)	5.0 (41.0)	−2.4 (27.7)	−7.5 (18.5)	4.9 (40.9)
Mean daily minimum °C (°F)	−12.6 (9.3)	−12.8 (9.0)	−7.0 (19.4)	1.4 (34.5)	7.9 (46.2)	11.9 (53.4)	14.1 (57.4)	12.3 (54.1)	7.5 (45.5)	2.0 (35.6)	−4.7 (23.5)	−10.3 (13.5)	0.8 (33.5)
Record low °C (°F)	−44.5 (−48.1)	−38.8 (−37.8)	−34.6 (−30.3)	−17.8 (0.0)	−6.0 (21.2)	−2.1 (28.2)	2.5 (36.5)	−0.6 (30.9)	−6.1 (21.0)	−21.3 (−6.3)	−34.8 (−30.6)	−44.3 (−47.7)	−44.5 (−48.1)
Average precipitation mm (inches)	28.9 (1.14)	21.5 (0.85)	23.9 (0.94)	31.0 (1.22)	37.1 (1.46)	66.8 (2.63)	65.2 (2.57)	56.8 (2.24)	50.6 (1.99)	45.1 (1.78)	32.9 (1.30)	30.5 (1.20)	490.3 (19.32)
Source: pogoda.ru.net
