= Nikolai Ilbekov =

- Born: Nikolai Filippovich Ilbekov; 19 May 1915; Shemurshinsky District, Chuvashia
- Died: 12 April 1981 (aged 65); Cheboksary, Chuvashia, Russia
- Occupations: Writer, poet, translator, pedagogue
- Writing career
- Language: Chuvash, Russian
- Notable work: Black bread (1958, 1961)

Nikolai Filippovich Ilbekov (Chuvash: Микулай Илпек Mikulai Ilpek; 1915 May 19 in Trekhizb-Shemursha, Buinsky Uyezd, Simbirsk Governorate – 1981 April 12 in Cheboksary) was a Chuvash prose writer.

Of his more than twenty books, the most significant is the novel Black Bread (Хура ҫӑкӑр), published 1958–1961. Black Bread depicts the pre-revolutionary life of the Chuvash people, the revolutionary events of 1905–1907, and the growth of self-consciousness of the Chuvash and Tatars.

== Life ==
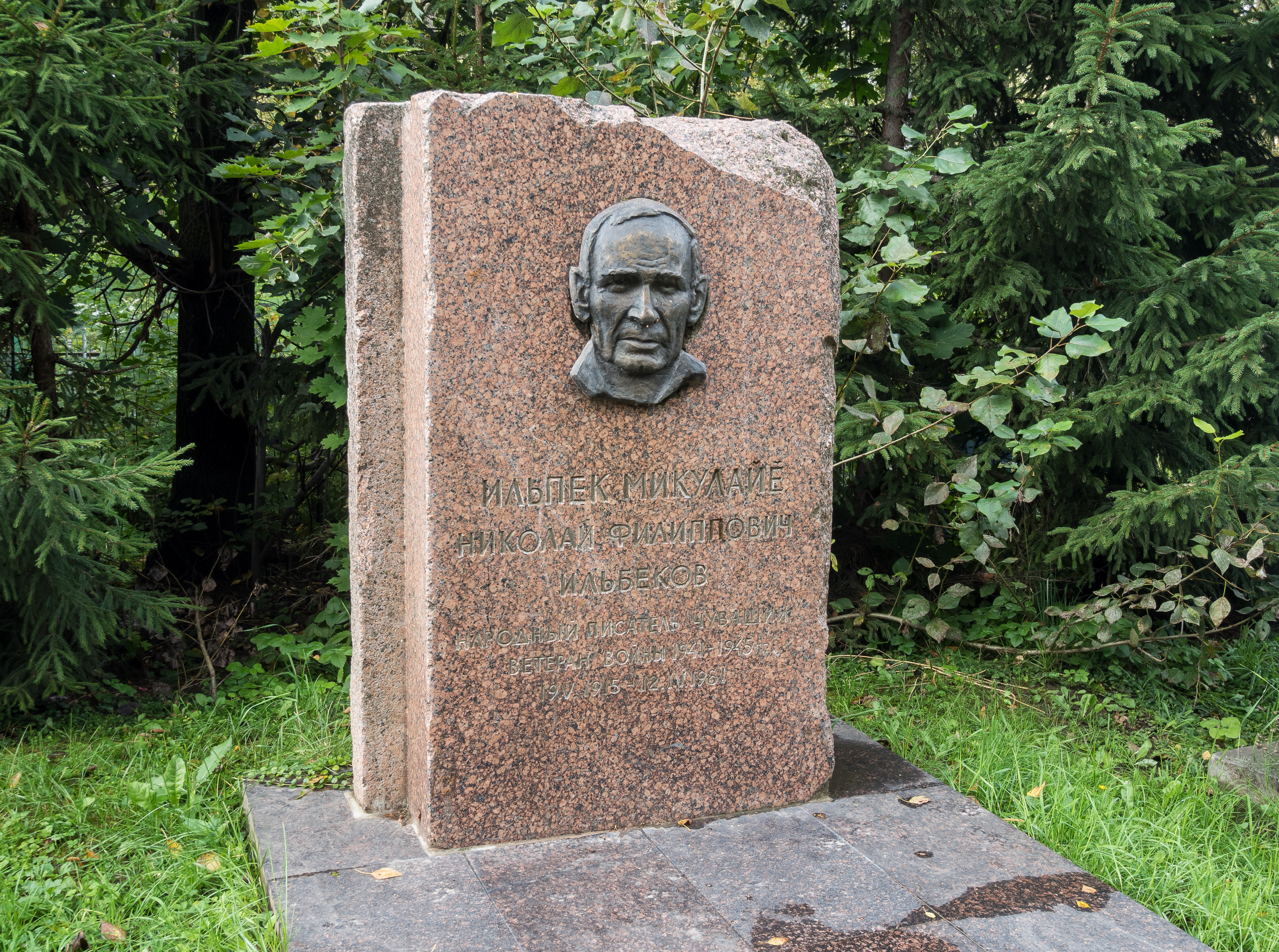
Ilbekov's tombstone in Cheboksary

Ilbekov worked as a senior editor of the Committee for Radio Communications and Broadcasting under the Council of People's Commissars of the Chuvash Autonomous Soviet Socialist Republic, as the senior editor of the Chuvash publishing house, as the executive secretary of the board of the Writers' Union of Chuvashia. He wrote short stories, novels, articles about other Chuvash writers, and translated the classics of Russian and foreign literature into the Chuvash language.

Ilbekov was awarded the honorary title of People's Writer of the Chuvash Autonomous Soviet Socialist Republic. A street in the center of Cheboksary is named after him.
