= Komsomolsky District, Chuvash Republic =

Komsomolsky District Комсомольский район (Russian)
- District

Other transcription(s)
  - Chuvash: Комсомольски районӗ
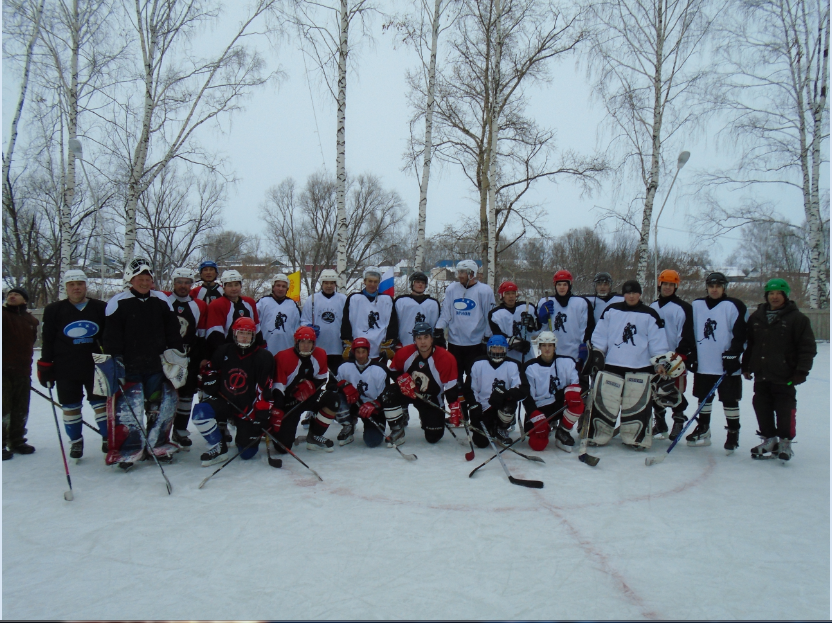
- Hockey tournament, Komsomolsky District

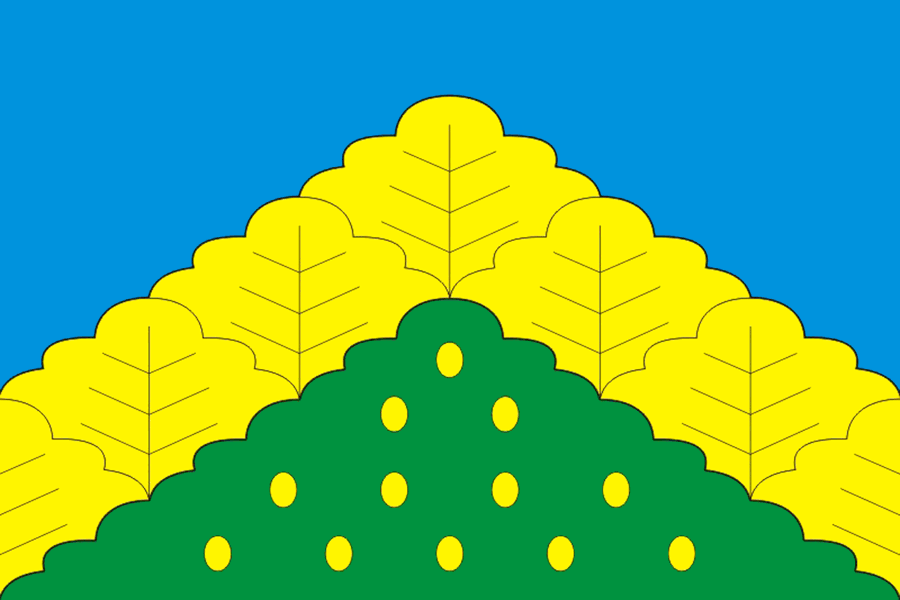
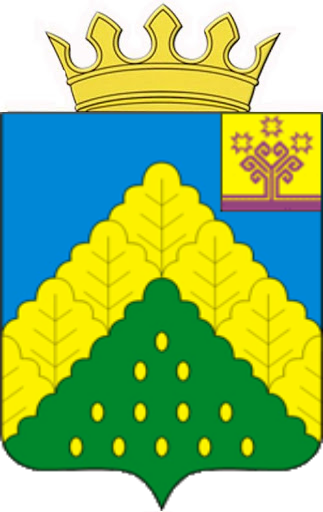
- Flag Coat of arms
- Location of Komsomolsky District in the Chuvash Republic
- Coordinates: 55.236°N 47.200°E
- Country: Russia
- Federal subject: Chuvash Republic
- Established: February 22, 1939
- Administrative center: Komsomolskoye

Area
  - Total: 630.3 km^{2} (243.4 sq mi)

Population (2010 Census)
  - Total: 26,951
  - Density: 42.76/km^{2} (110.7/sq mi)
  - Urban: 0%
  - Rural: 100%

Administrative structure
  - Administrative divisions: 12 rural settlement
  - Inhabited localities: 54 rural localities

Municipal structure
  - Municipally incorporated as: Komsomolsky Municipal District
  - Municipal divisions: 0 urban settlements, 12 rural settlements
- Time zone: UTC+3 (MSK)
- OKTMO ID: 97621000
- Website: https://gov.cap.ru/main.asp?govid=66

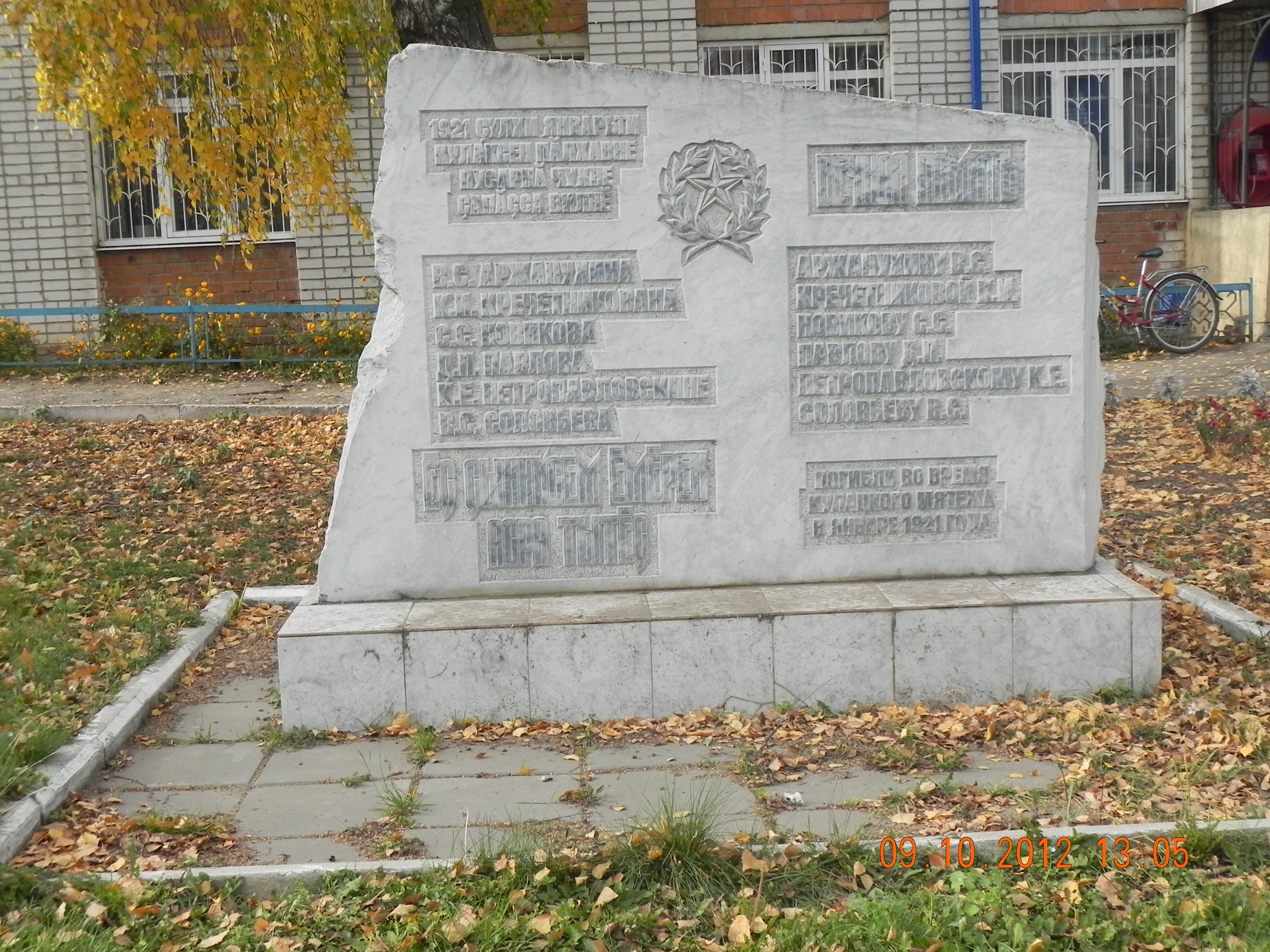
Monument to communists and Soviet activists who died during the kulak revolt, Komsomolsky District

Komsomolsky District (Russian: Комcомо́льский райо́н; Chuvash: Комсомольски районӗ, Komsomolski rayonĕ) is an administrative and municipal district (raion), one of the twenty-one in the Chuvash Republic, Russia. It is located in the southeast of the republic and borders with Kanashsky District in the north, Yalchiksky District and the Republic of Tatarstan in the east, Batyrevsky District in the south, and with Ibresinsky District in the west. The area of the district is 630.3 square kilometers (243.4 sq mi). Its administrative center is the rural locality (a selo) of Komsomolskoye. Population: 26,951 (2010 census); 27,273 (2002 census); 28,627 (1989 Soviet census). The population of Komsomolskoye accounts for 18.2% of the district's total population.

== History ==
The district was formed on February 22, 1939.

== Famous people ==
- Victor Nemtsev — Folk's artist of the Chuvash Republic.
- Valerie Tourgay — Folk's Poet of the Chuvash Republic (2003)
