= Avdankasy =

Avdankasy Авданкасы
- Village
- Location within Chuvash Republic Location within Russia
- Coordinates: 55°52′N 46°55′E
- Country: Russia
- Region: Chuvashia
- District: Morgaushsky District
- Time zone: UTC+3:00

Avdankasy (Russian: Авданкасы; Chuvash: Автанкасси, Avtankassi) is a rural locality (a village) in Shatmaposinskoye Rural Settlement of Morgaushsky District, Chuvashia, Russia. The population was 180 as of 2012. There are 5 streets.

== Geography ==
Avdankasy is located 16 km southeast of Morgaushi (the district's administrative centre) by road. Shatmaposi is the nearest rural locality.
