= Vurnary =

Urban locality in Chuvashia, Russia

Coordinates: 55°29′27″N 46°57′17″E

Vurnary (Russian: Вурнары, Chuvash: Вăрнар, Vărnar) is an urban-type settlement and the administrative center of Vurnarsky District, the Chuvash Republic, Russia. Population: 10,086 (2010 census); 10,929 (2002 census); 12,492 (1989 Soviet census).
