= Komsomolskoye, Chuvash Republic =

Rural locality in Chuvashia, Russia

Coordinates: 55°15′46″N 47°32′23″E

Komsomolskoye (Russian: Комсомольское, Chuvash: Каçал, Kaśal) is a rural locality (a selo) and the administrative center of Komsomolsky District of the Chuvash Republic, Russia. Population: 4,905 (2010 census); 4,839 (2002 census); 4,673 (1989 Soviet census).

Historical population
| Year | Pop. | ±% |
|---|---|---|
| 1959 | 2,346 | — |
| 1970 | 2,868 | +22.3% |
| 1979 | 3,608 | +25.8% |
| 1989 | 4,673 | +29.5% |
| 2002 | 4,839 | +3.6% |
| 2010 | 4,905 | +1.4% |
| 2021 | 4,632 | −5.6% |
Source: Census data
