= Boris Cheendykov =

Chuvash playwright, novelist and poet

Boris Chindykov
- Born: Boris Borisovich Chindykov; 8 January 1960 village Baltai, Yadrinsky District, Chuvash Republic, USSR
- Occupations: writer, poet, translator
- Writing career
- Language: Chuvash, Russian
- Notable work: Blackberries along the fence

Boris Chindykov (born August 1, 1960, vil. Balday, Chuvash ASSR, USSR) was a Chuvash playwright, novelist, poet, essayist, translator.

Member of the Writers' Union of USSR (1990). Laureate of the State Prize of the Chuvash Republic in the field of literature and art. (1993, "Blackberries along the fence" (Chuvash: Ҫатан карта ҫинчи хӑмла ҫырли)

== Biography ==
Born in Aug. 1, 1960 in the village Balday (Yadrinsky District, Chuvash Republic).

In 1984 he graduated from the Moscow Maxim Gorky Literature Institute.

In 1985-1988 - Literary adviser of the Union of Writers of the Chuvash Republic, both supervisor department of literary criticism and journalism magazine "Tӑvan Atӑl)." In 1994–1997. chief editor of "The Face of Chuvashia."

He publish a newspaper "Avan-i" (1990-1993) And "Advertisements and announcements" (1992-1993, now "Express Mail", Cheboksary).

In 1996–2007 years he worked in Moscow in the Turkish travel agencies as translator, advertising manager and director.

In March and October 2009, he worked as chief-editor "Tăvan en" / Native Land, edition of "TE" of the local newspaper picked up the Republican "Shupashkar en haçachĕ" / Newspaper Cheboksary region, began to produce an annex to the main edition - "Pricheboksare" (in Russian).

Translated by different authors with the Chuvash and Turkish to Russian, also from English, Russian, Turkish languages into Chuvash.

== Works ==
=== Books ===
- «Чӳк уйӑхӗ» («November», novels, 1987);
- «Ҫурҫӗр хыҫҫӑнхи апатлану» («Dinner after midnight», drama, 1992);
- «Urazmet» (tragedy, 1993);
- «Ҫатан карта ҫинчи хура хӑмла ҫырли» («Blackberries along the fence», play, 1995);
- «Хура чӗкеҫ» («Black swallow» monodrama, 2003);
- «Шведский стол» (Smorgasbord, drama, 2003);

=== Drama ===
- «Алӑксем умӗнче» (At the doors, 1995);
- «Ҫӗр хӑйӑрӗн тусанӗ» (Sand dust, 1981);
- «Хупланнӑ тӗкӗрсем» (Closed mirrors, 1997;
- «Урасмет» (Urazmet)
- «Масаркасси ясарӗн ҫитмӗл ҫиччӗмӗш матки» (Seventy-seventh wife of a libertine from Masarkassi, song and dance striptease farce)
- «Сарӑ хӗр Нарспи» («Beauty Narspy», the libretto for the musical)

=== Novels ===
- «Ӑҫта каян, чӗкеҫ…» (Where do you fly, swallow)
- «Hotel Chuvashia»
- «Нараста» (Narasta, 1990);
- «Пуҫӑм ыратать» (Head hurts, 1988);
- «Бобби» (Bobby, 1988);
- «Тухса кайиччен» (Before leaving, 1988);
- «Хутлӑ канфет» (Sweets in wrapper, 1988);
- «Йӗпхӳ» (Drizzle);
- «Элчел: love story» (1982);
- «Кӗлчечек» (Roses for Romeo, 1983)

=== Translations from Chuvash into Russian ===
- Юрий Скворцов: «Aughakhve’s birch», story.
- Хветӗр Уяр: «Belated rain», novella.
- Александр Артемьев: «Waste», story.

=== The texts of popular songs ===
- «Пӗчӗк тӑлӑх хӗрачам» (Little orphan)
- «Пӗчӗк калаҫу» (Short talking)
- «Пукане» (Puppet)
- «Йӑнӑш ӑнлантӑн» (I haven't understand)
- «Эпӗ шутланӑччӗ» (I supoused)
- «Амӑшӗсем» (Our mothers)

=== In Russian ===
- «Blackberries along the fence», drama, 1994;
- «Dinner after midnight», drama, 1992)
- «Smorgasbord», play, 1996);
- «The king's garden», children's play, 1996);
- «Essays», 1997);
- «Khan’s return», story, 2000).
