= Nina Nemtseva =

Soviet-Uzbek scholar, archaeologist and architect

Nina Borisovna Nemtseva (1926 in Ufa – 2021 in Düsseldorf) was a Soviet and Uzbek scholar-medievalist, archaeologist and architect-restorer, Ph.D. in history (1972).

== Early life and education ==
Nina Borisovna Nemtseva was born on 12 December 1926 in Ufa, Bashkir ASSR. Her father, Boris Nikolayevich, worked as an engineer on the railway, her mother, Elizaveta Pavlovna, was a doctor.

In her early years, Nina moved with her parents to Beloretsk. Her childhood actually ended when her father was arrested in 1937. Elizaveta Pavlovna and her three children were immediately evicted from the departmental flat. For almost three years, while Boris Nemtsev's case was under investigation, his family wandered around in rented corners. Beloretsk was a small town, and everyone knew the Nemtsevs as a family of an enemy of the people.

Boris Nikolayevich did not confess against himself, and the investigators could not prove his guilt. After two years and nine months he was released "for lack of corpus delicti", paid his salary for all the time spent in prison, and was reinstated in the All-Union Communist Party (Bolsheviks). The family was reunited, but not for long - the war began. On 29 November 1942 Boris Nikolayevich died in battle near the farm Vertyachiy.

In her youth Nina Borisovna dreamed to become a doctor, but the war confused her plans. The family needed additional bread cards, so at the insistence of her mother, she graduated from the seven-year school in 1941 and entered the Beloretsk Pedagogical College, finishing in 1944.

She was a student of Mikhail Yevgenyevich Masson and Galina Anatolevna Pugachenkova. Graduated in 1950 from the Central Asian State University (Faculty of History, Department of Archaeology). She studied architectural and archaeological monuments of Central Asian architecture.

== Career ==
For many years she led excavations of the palace complex of the Karakhanid era Rabati Malik, conducted archaeological work in the Shah-i-Zinda ensemble and in the settlement of Afrasiab (Samarkand), in the mausoleums of Sayf al-Din Bakharzi (Bukhara) and Khoja Ahmed Yasawi (Turkestan), at other sites in the Central Asian region. In the late 1970s and early 1980s she conducted route reconnaissance surveys in the Syrdarya and Jizzakh regions, necessary for the compilation of the Code of Archaeological Monuments of Uzbekistan.

She taught at school for almost a year. When the war ended, Nina Borisovna again thought about getting higher medical education. Her choice fell on the Tashkent Medical Academy.

Author of 5 books, several brochures and about one hundred and fifty scientific articles.
