= Ibresinsky District =

Ibresinsky District Ибресинский район (Russian)
- District

Other transcription(s)
  - Chuvash: Йĕпреç районӗ
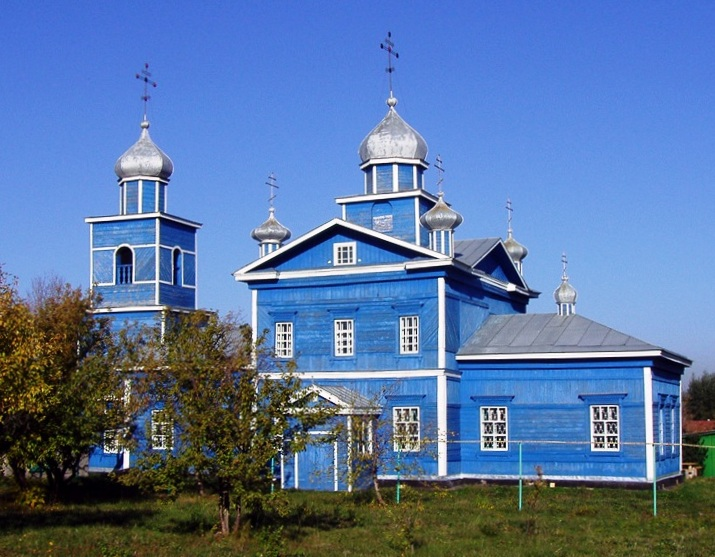
- Church in Village Klimovo, Ibresinsky District

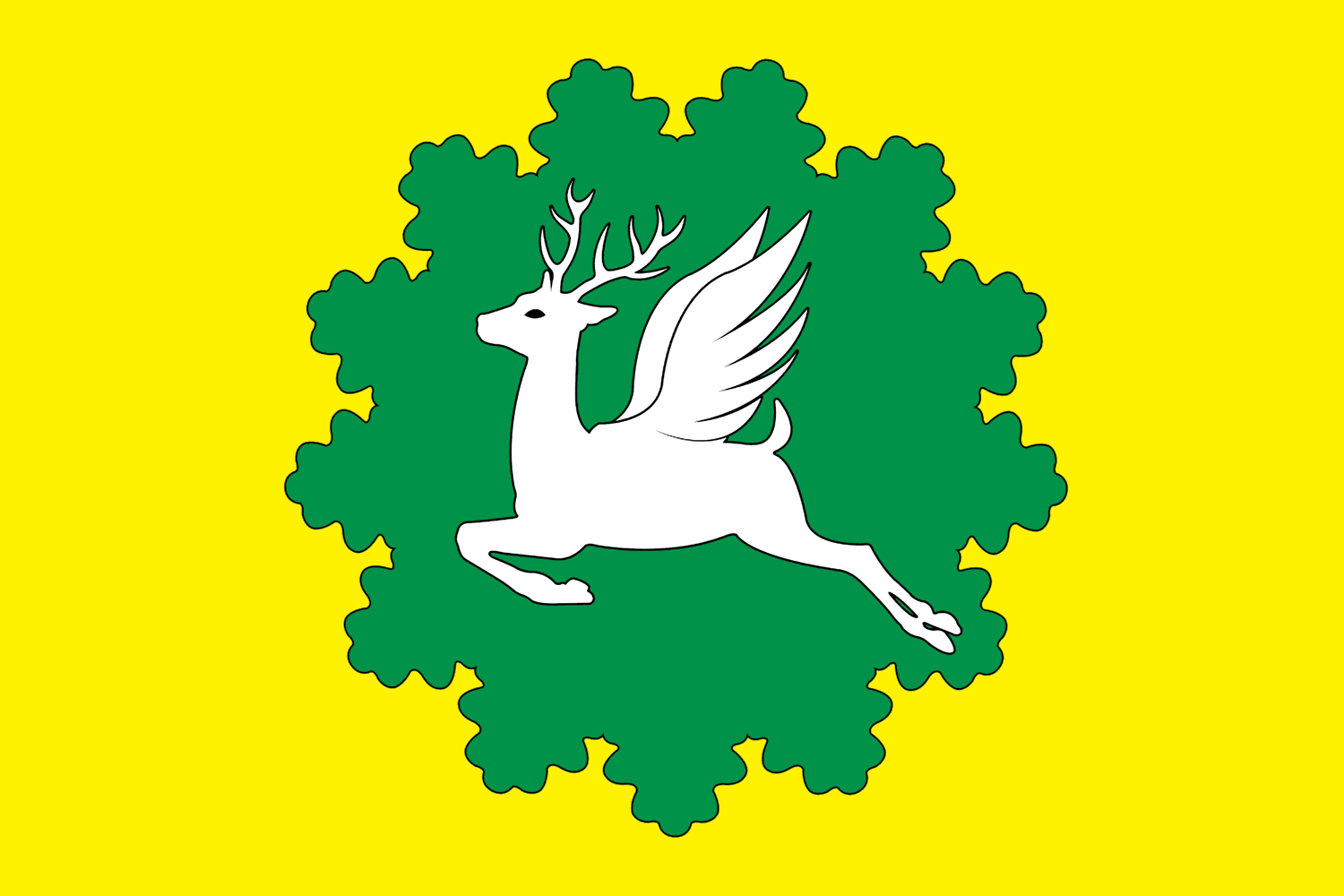
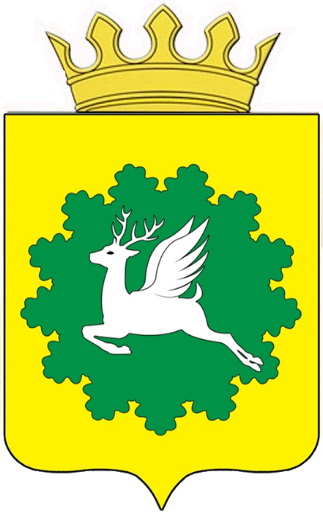
- Flag Coat of arms
- Location of Ibresinsky District in the Chuvash Republic
- Coordinates: 55°18′N 47°02′E
- Country: Russia
- Federal subject: Chuvash Republic
- Established: September 5, 1944
- Administrative center: Ibresi

Area
  - Total: 1,201.2 km^{2} (463.8 sq mi)

Population (2010 Census)
  - Total: 26,192
  - Density: 21.805/km^{2} (56.474/sq mi)
  - Urban: 32.1%
  - Rural: 67.9%

Administrative structure
  - Administrative divisions: 1 Urban settlements, 12 Rural settlements
  - Inhabited localities: 2 urban-type settlements, 55 rural localities

Municipal structure
  - Municipally incorporated as: Ibresinsky Municipal District
  - Municipal divisions: 1 urban settlements, 12 rural settlements
- Time zone: UTC+3 (MSK)
- OKTMO ID: 97613000
- Website: http://gov.cap.ru/main.asp?govid=60

Ibresinsky District (Russian: Ибре́синский райо́н; Chuvash: Йĕпреç районӗ, Yĕpreś rayonĕ) is an administrative and municipal district (raion), one of the twenty-one in the Chuvash Republic, Russia. It is located in the southern central part of the republic and borders with Vurnarsky and Kanashsky Districts in the north, Komsomolsky District in the east, Batyrevsky and Alatyrsky Districts in the south, and with Shumerlinsky and Poretsky Districts in the west. The area of the district is 1,201.2 square kilometers (463.8 sq mi). Its administrative center is the urban locality (an urban-type settlement) of Ibresi. Population: 26,192 (2010 census); 28,377 (2002 census); 28,471 (1989 Soviet census).

== History ==
The district was formed on September 5, 1944.

== Notable residents ==
- Lidiya Grigoryeva (born 1974 in Smychka), long-distance runner
- Irina Timofeyeva (born 1970 in Smychka), long-distance runner

== See also ==
- Alshikhovo
