= Yalchiki =

Rural locality in Chuvashia, Russia

Coordinates: 55°09′50″N 48°00′29″E

Yalchiki (Russian: Яльчики, Chuvash: Елчĕк, Yelçĕk) is a rural locality (a selo) and the administrative center of Yalchiksky District of the Chuvash Republic, Russia. Population: 2,544 (2010 census); 2,732 (2002 census); 2,961 (1989 Soviet census).
