= Ibresi =

Urban locality in Chuvashia, Russia

Coordinates: 55°18′20″N 47°02′49″E

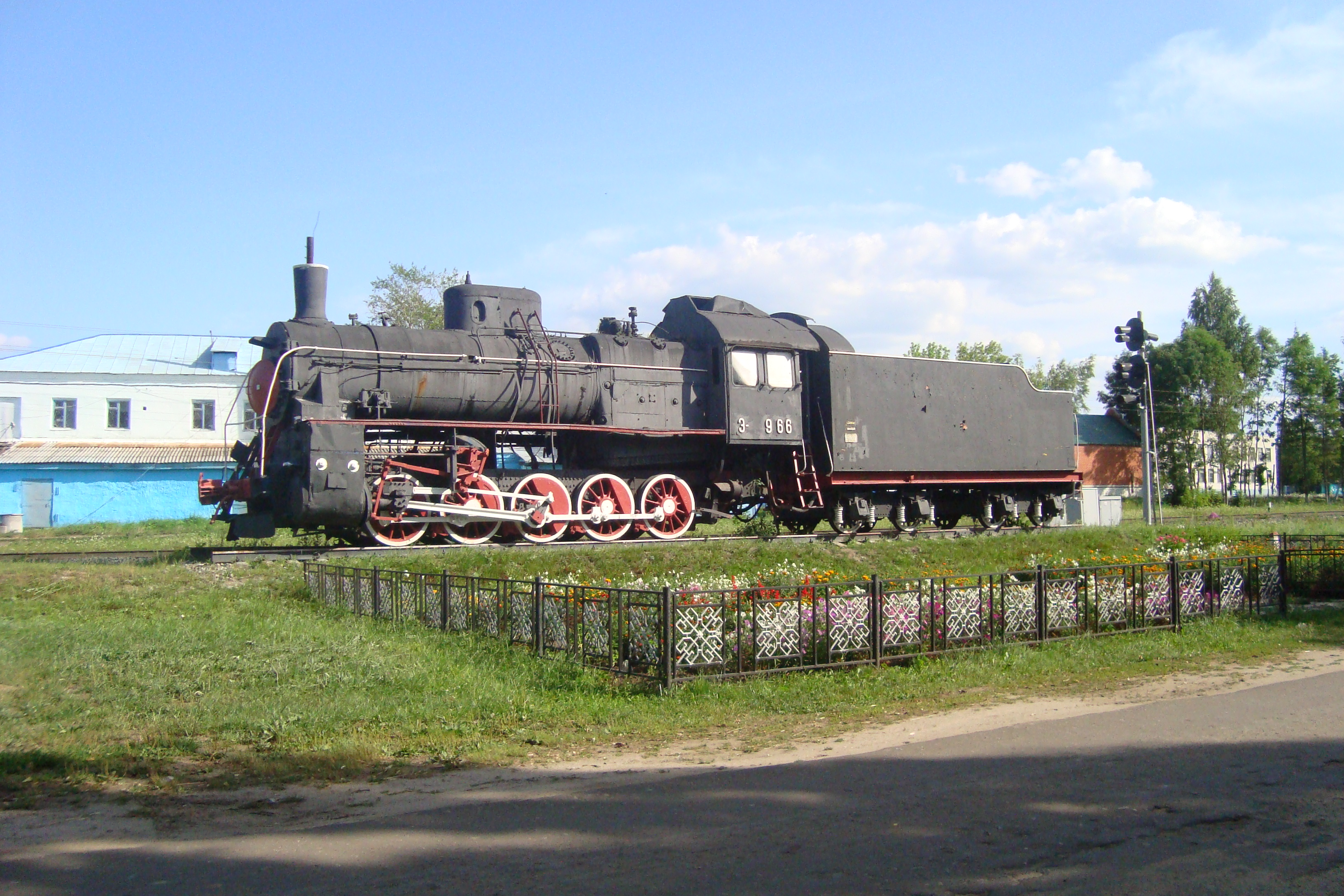
Locomotive-monument in Ibresia

Ibresi (Russian: Ибре́си, Chuvash: Йĕпреç, Yĕpreś) is an urban-type settlement and the administrative center of Ibresinsky District, Chuvashia, Russia. Population: 8,415 (2010 census); 9,201 (2002 census); 8,682 (1989 Soviet census).
