= Konstantin Ivanov (poet) =

Chuvash poet (1890–1915)

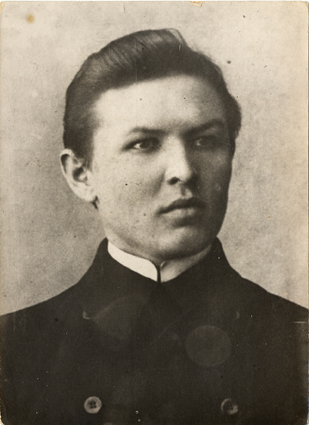
- Born: Konstantin Vasilyevich Ivanov; 27 May [O.S. 15 May] 1890; Slakbash village, Russia
- Died: 26 March [O.S. 13 March] 1915 (aged 24); Slakbash village, Russia
- Occupations: Poet and translator
- Writing career
- Language: Chuvash
- Notable work: Narspi (1908)

Konstantin Vasilyevich Ivanov (Russian: Константин Васильевич Иванов, Chuvash: Пӑртта Кӗҫтентинӗ; 27 May [O.S. 15 May] 1890 – 26 March [O.S. 13 March] 1915) was a Chuvash poet and important figure in Chuvash literature.

== Biography ==
Konstantin Vasilyevich Ivanov was born in a peasant Chuvash family. Many of his relatives, who valued education, were literate, something unusual for the time. Ivanov's father was one of the richest people in the village and he ran a successful farm using his knowledge of agronomy and economics.

Ivanov joined his village's primary school when he was eight years old. He finished in 1902 and moved to Belebey City School for further studies, where he took a preparatory class at Simbirsk Chuvash Teacher's School. Two years later, at the age of 15, he enrolled at the Chuvash Educational Center.

It was there that he showed great interest in literature, read many novels on Russian and Western cultures, and enthusiastically studied painting and sculpture. When visiting home during vacation periods, he wrote down tall stories, local folk history, texts containing conspiracy theories, and folk prayers. This improved his appreciation of national identity and artistic people.

Due to his increasing interest in painting, Ivanov joined the Academy of Arts. He developed professional photography skills, which he used to depict many scenes from Simbirsk.

Following the events from 1905 to 1907, he released "Chuvash Marseillaise" (Get up, rise, Chuvash!).

Later, Ivanov translated Mikhail Lermontov's poems The Prisoner, Waves and People, Sail, Peaks, Cliff, Cup of Life, and, with much effort, the Chuvash arrangement of The Song of the Merchant Kalashnikov.

In the autumn of 1914, Ivanov contracted tuberculosis. He died on 13 March 1915 at the age of 24.

== Literature ==
- Yakovlev I.Y., My life: Memoirs, Moscow, Republica, 1997.
- Sirotkin M. Y., K. V. Ivanov, Essay, Cheboksary, 1955.
- Abashev V. N., Чувашская поэма/Chuvash poem, Cheboksary, 1964.
- Chuvash writers, Биобиблиографический справочник, Cheboksary, 1964.
- D. V. Gordeev, Yu. A. Silem, «Anthology of Chuvash literature», Cheboksary, 2003. ISBN 5-7670-1279-2.
