= Slakbash =

Slakbash Слакбаш
- Selo
- Location within Bashkortostan Location within Russia
- Coordinates: 54°05′N 54°04′E
- Country: Russia
- Region: Bashkortostan
- District: Belebeyevsky District
- Time zone: UTC+5:00

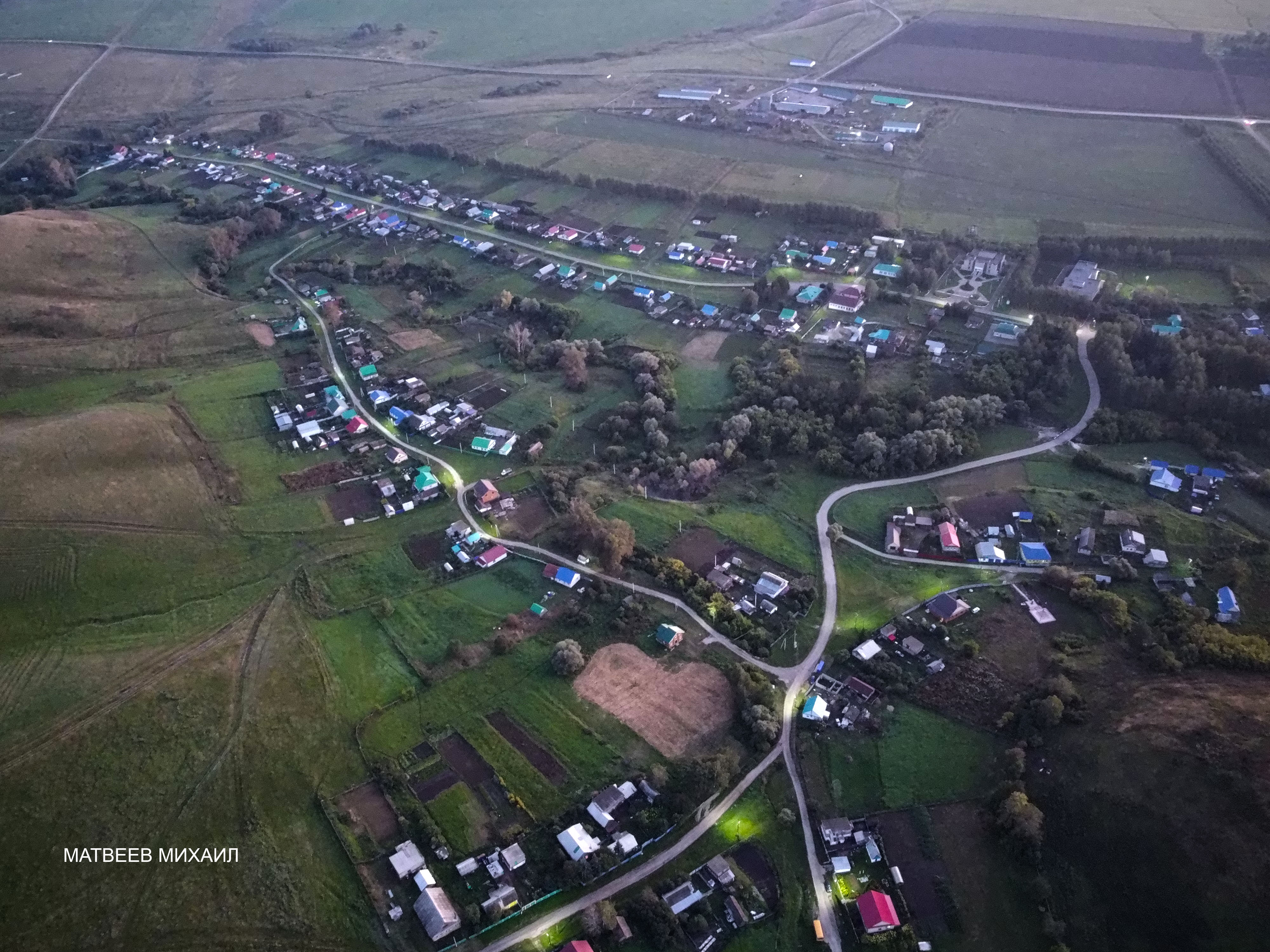
View of Slakbash from above

Slakbash (Chuvash: Слакпуç, Slakpuś; Bashkir: Ыҫлаҡбаш, Iślaqbaş; Russian: Слакбаш) is a rural locality (a selo) and the administrative centre of Slakbashevsky Selsoviet, Belebeyevsky District, Bashkortostan, Russia. The population was 551 as of 2010. There are 10 streets.

== Geography ==
Slakbash is located 30 km southeast of Belebey (the district's administrative centre) by road. Glukhovskaya is the nearest rural locality.

== Links ==
- Татьяна Ефремова: О Сильби, мекке чувашского народа на землях Башкорстана
- Виталий Станьял: Удар по башкирской Швейцарии
- Елена Ухсай: Современный вандализм, или Когда земля плачет
- Витус Неберинг: Экоконфликт превращается в национальную чуму
