= Mišši Śeśpĕl =

Chuvash poet

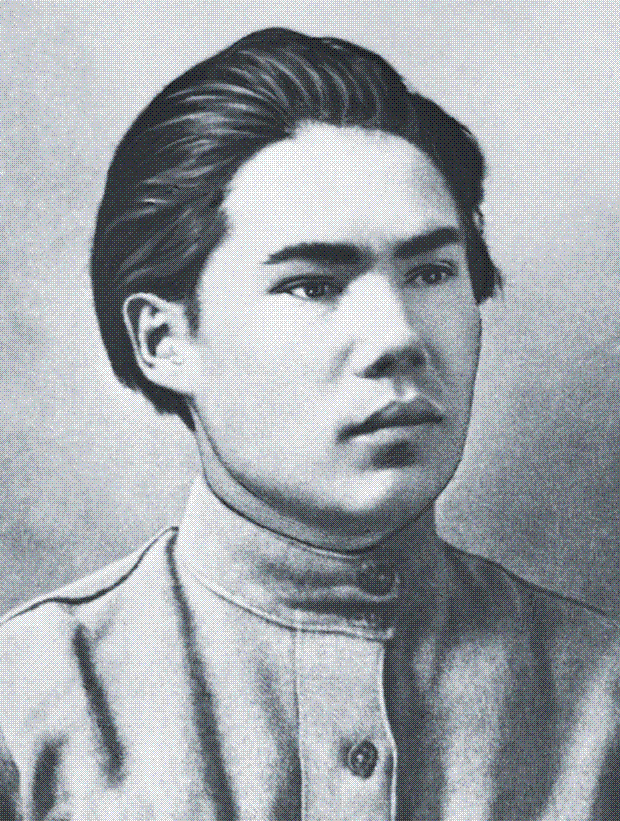
Mišši Śeśpĕl

Mišši Śeśpĕl (Russian: Михаил Сеспель, Chuvash: Ҫеҫпӗл Мишши; Chuvash Latin: Mišši Śeśpĕl; pronounced [ˈɕeɕpɘlʲmiʂˈʂɨ]; 1899 – 1922) was a Chuvash poet. He is considered a founder of Soviet Chuvash poetry.

== Biography ==
Born November 16, 1899, in the village Kazakkassy, Tsivilsky Uyezd of Kazan Governorate. After he graduated from the two-year school in Shikhazany he enrolled in the Tetyush's teacher's seminary.

Then he studied in Moscow in the agitators and propagandists courses. Member of Шихазаны (Шихазанское сельское поселение) from 1918. After the formation of the Chuvash Autonomous Region in 1920, he was elected chairman of the Revolutionary Tribunal of the Chuvash Autonomous Region.

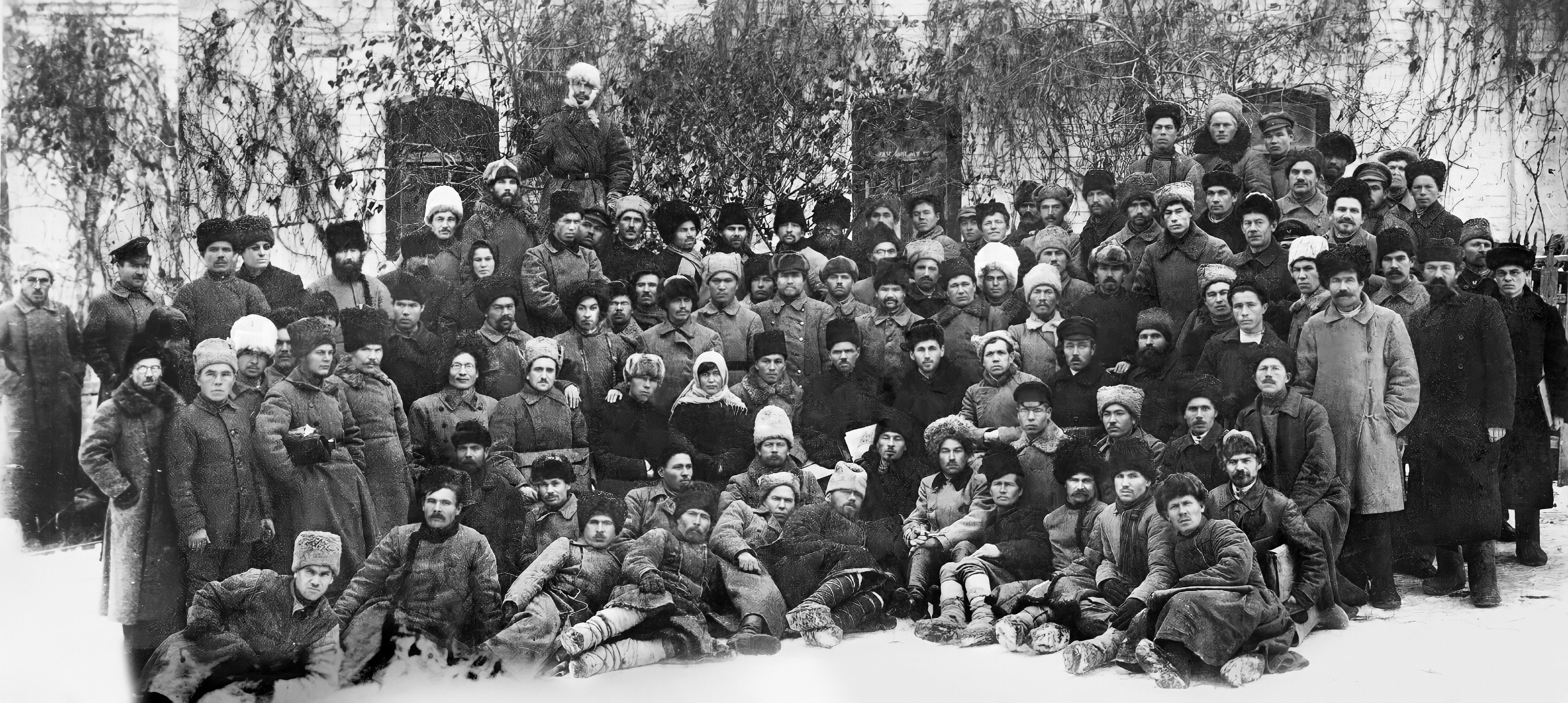
Mišši Śeśpĕl pictured (top far right) among the first Chuvash Autonomous Congress.

He worked in the department of education in the Commission interpreters.

In December 1920, Śeśpĕl was arrested, accused of setting fire to the Chuvash Justice Department by members of the Chuvash Congress who disagreed with his views that communists should not live in luxury. After 3 months of incarceration, and the campaigning of his comrades to free him, Śeśpĕl was released on 7 February 1921. For a short while after his release, Śeśpĕl worked in the education department for the translators commission.

After his release from prison, Śeśpĕl spent the Spring of 1921 in a sanatorium in Evpatoria, in an attempt to treat both his skeletal tuberculosis and worsening mental health.

Rather than returning to Chuvashia, Śeśpĕl travelled to Kyiv and enrolled in Kyiv Art School, though was drafted into the Red Army on his arrival.

As Śeśpĕl's tuberculosis worsened and was exacerbated by his military service, he was removed from the front line and placed in the army reserve. During this time, Śeśpĕl's vision began to worsen to the point where he was almost entirely blind. He resided with his confidant Fyodor Pokryshen who worked for the district land office in Ostyorsky in Oster. He was open with his friend about his deepening depression and emerging suicidal thoughts.

On 15 June 1922, Śeśpĕl argued with his commander N. Shavchenko, after deciding to share his grain ration of 8 poods with incoming refugees from Kherson Province. Later the same day, Śeśpĕl committed suicide by hanging himself by a tree in the garden of his residence.

On 5 November 1954, Śeśpĕl's remains were reburied in the park Oster where a memorial tombstone was installed.

In 1969, the native village of Mišši Śeśpĕl was renamed in his honor.

In the 1970s, a memorial plaque was installed outside his Kyiv residence.

== Memory ==
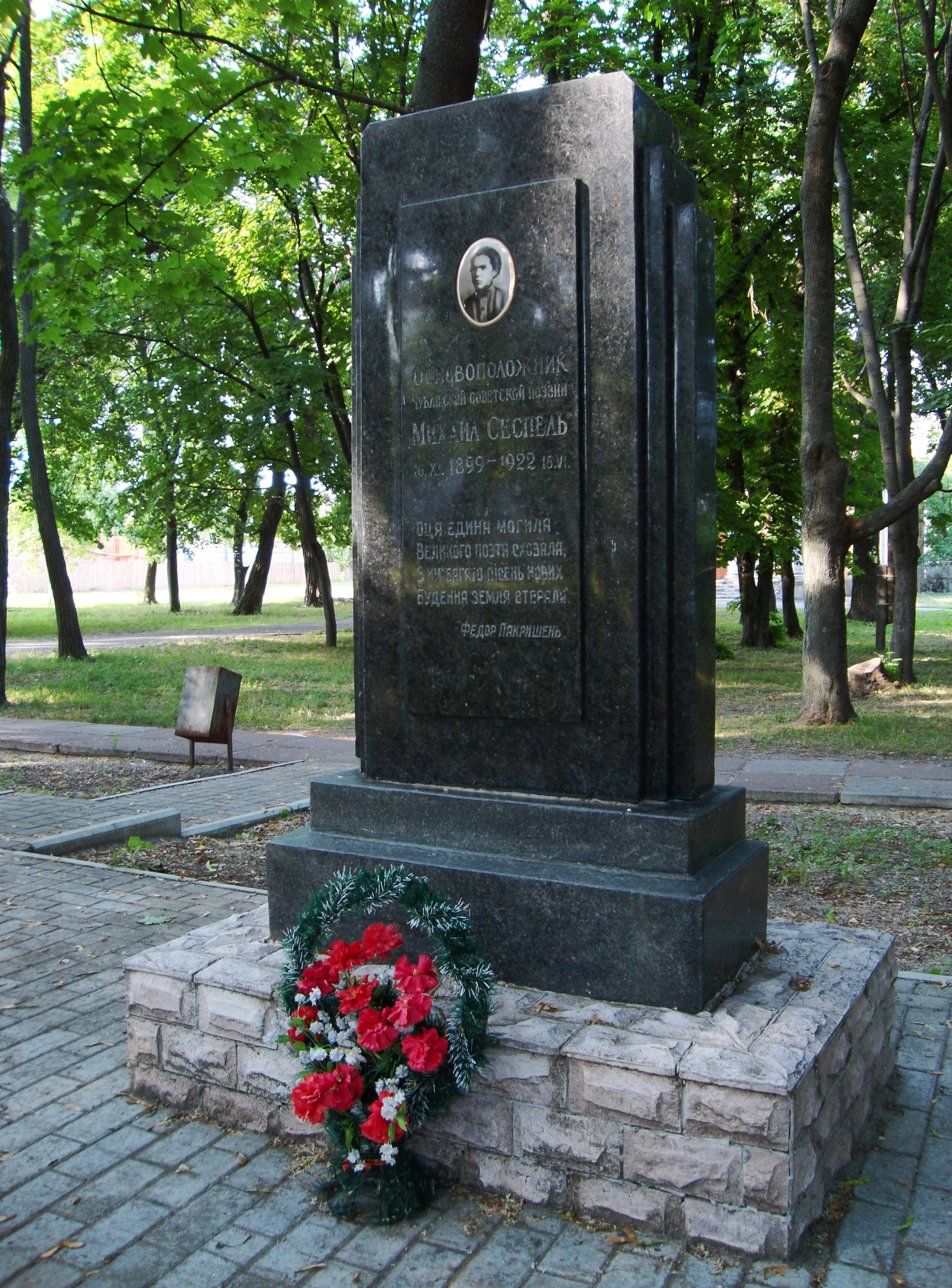
Mišši Śeśpĕl's gravestone in Oster. 50.9551017°N 30.8748651°E

- Mišši Śeśpĕl's museum, vil. Sespel, Kanashsky District, Chuvashia.
- Mišši Śeśpĕl's museum, Palace of Justice, Cheboksary, Chuvashia.
- Poet's bust, Lenin's Prosp, Cheboksary.
- Regional museum of Pedagogic College, Mišši Śeśpĕl's corner, Tetyushi, Tatarstan.
- Poet's grave and Section of Regional museum, Oster, Ukraine.
- Mišši Śeśpĕl's museum, school No. 1, Oster, Ukraine.
- Streets:
  - in Cheboksary, Chuvashia.
  - in Oster, Ukraine.
- Mišši Śeśpĕl's park, Oster, Ukraine.
- Cinema "Sespel", Cheboksary, Chuvashia.
- Ship Mikhail Sespel Russia

== Literature ==
- Сироткин М. Я., Очерки истории чувашской советской литературы — Cheboksary, 1956.
- Основоположник чувашской советской поэзии — Cheboksary: «Уч. зап. Чуваш. НИИ», 1971. — Т. 51.
- «Чӑваш литературин антологийӗ» (Chuvash literature anthology), editors: D. V. Gordeev, Y. A. Silem. Cheboksary, 2003. ISBN 5-7670-1279-2 .
