= Yantikovo, Yantikovsky District, Chuvash Republic =

Rural locality in Chuvashia, Russia

Coordinates: 55°30′50″N 47°46′40″E

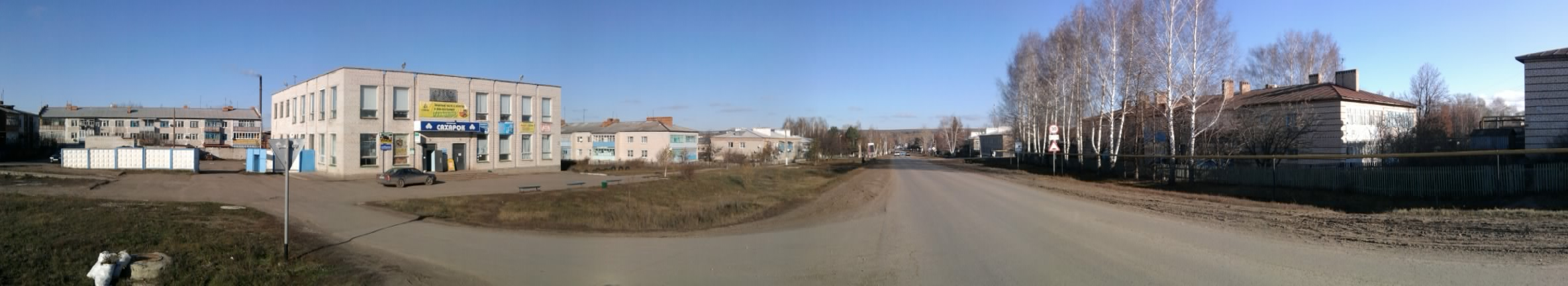
The village main street in Yantikovo

Yantikovo (Russian: Янтиково, Chuvash: Тăвай, Tăvay) is a rural locality (a selo) and the administrative center of Yantikovsky District of the Chuvash Republic, Russia. Population: 3,151 (2010 census); 3,363 (2002 census); 3,573 (1989 Soviet census).
