= Shemurshinsky District =

Shemurshinsky District Шемуршинский район (Russian)
- District

Other transcription(s)
  - Chuvash: Шăмăршă районӗ
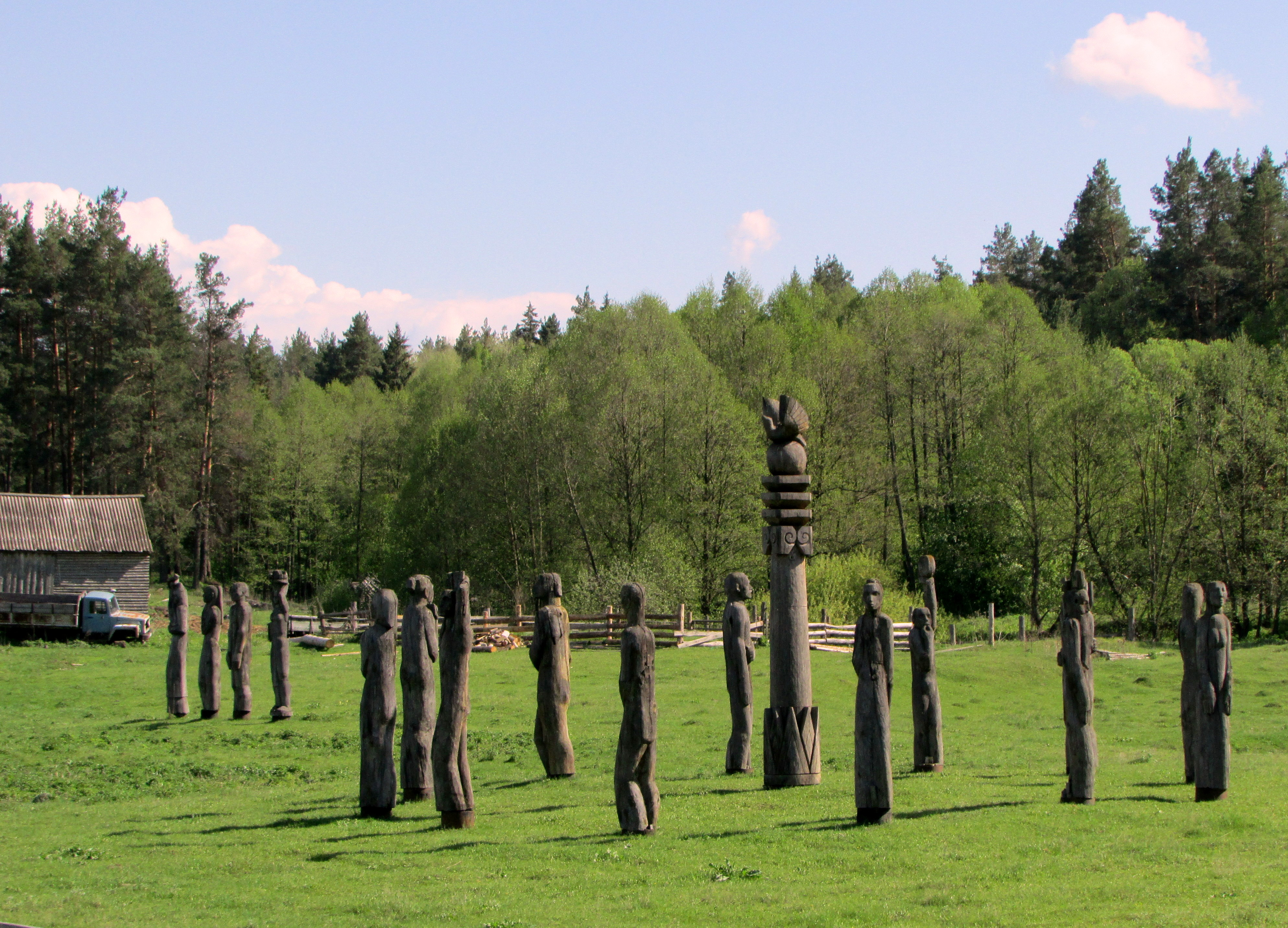
- Chavash Varmane National Park, Shemurshinsky District

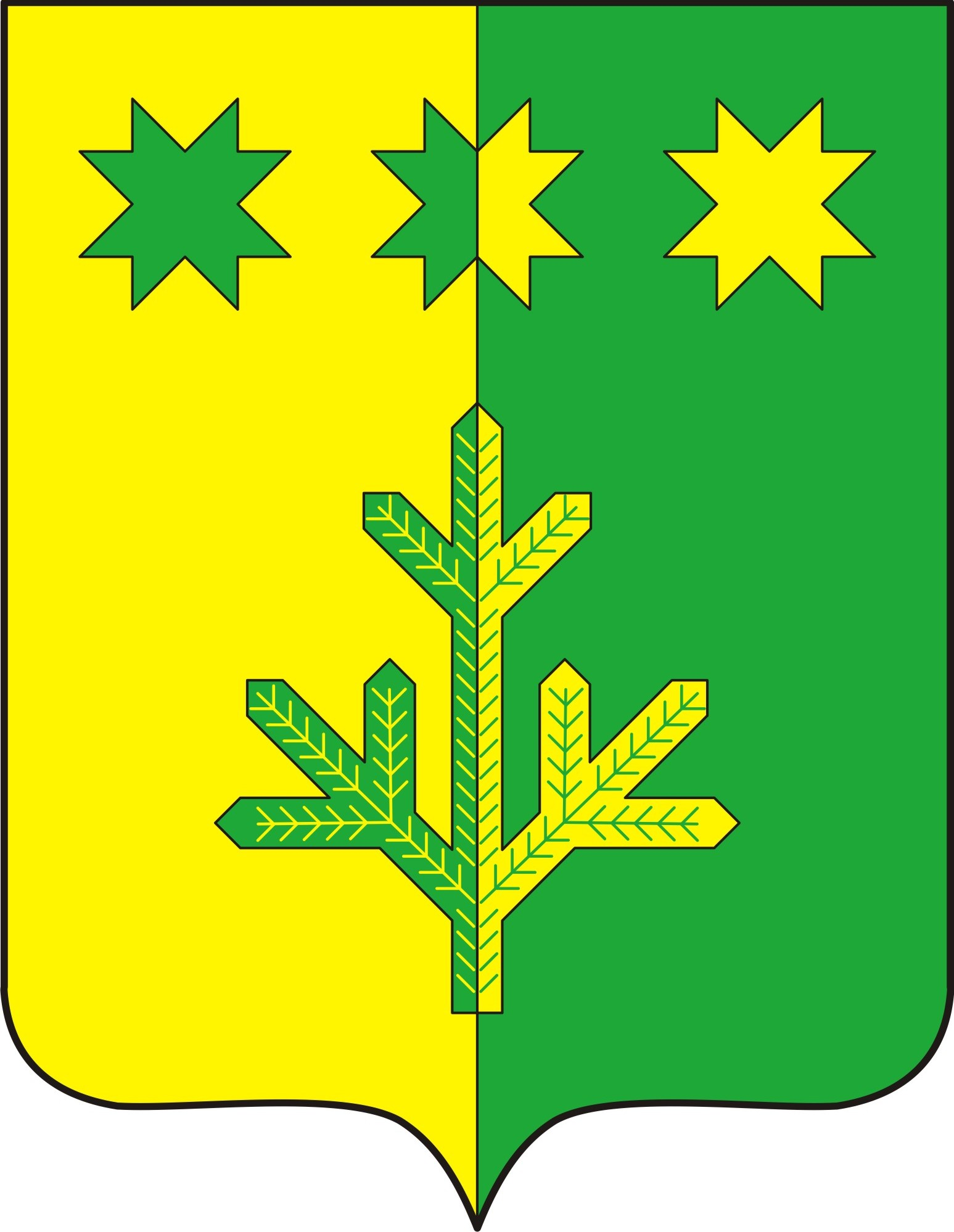
- Flag Coat of arms
- Location of Shemurshinsky District in the Chuvash Republic
- Coordinates: 55.808°N 46.896°E
- Country: Russia
- Federal subject: Chuvash Republic
- Established: 1927
- Administrative center: Shemursha

Area
  - Total: 799.1 km^{2} (308.5 sq mi)

Population (2010 Census)
  - Total: 14,759
  - Density: 18.47/km^{2} (47.84/sq mi)
  - Urban: 0%
  - Rural: 100%

Administrative structure
  - Administrative divisions: 9 rural settlement
  - Inhabited localities: 31 rural localities

Municipal structure
  - Municipally incorporated as: Shemurshinsky Municipal District
  - Municipal divisions: 0 urban settlements, 9 rural settlements
- Time zone: UTC+3 (MSK)
- OKTMO ID: 97647000
- Website: http://gov.cap.ru/main.asp?govid=75

Shemurshinsky District (Russian: Шемурши́нский район; Chuvash: Шăмăршă районӗ, Şămărşă rayonĕ) is an administrative and municipal district (raion), one of the twenty-one in the Chuvash Republic, Russia. It is located in the south and southwest of the republic. The area of the district is 799.1 square kilometers (308.5 sq mi). Its administrative center is the rural locality (a selo) of Shemursha. Population: 14,759 (2010 census); 16,588 (2002 Census); 18,186 (1989 Soviet census). The population of Shemursha accounts for 25.5% of the district's total population.

== Notable residents ==
- Nikolai Ilbekov (1915–1981, born in Trekhizb-Shemursha, Buinsky Uyezd), writer
- Fedor Madurov (1942–2022, born in Baskaki), sculptor and graphic artist
