= Yalchiksky District =

Yalchiksky District Яльчикский район (Russian)
- District

Other transcription(s)
  - Chuvash: Елчĕк районӗ
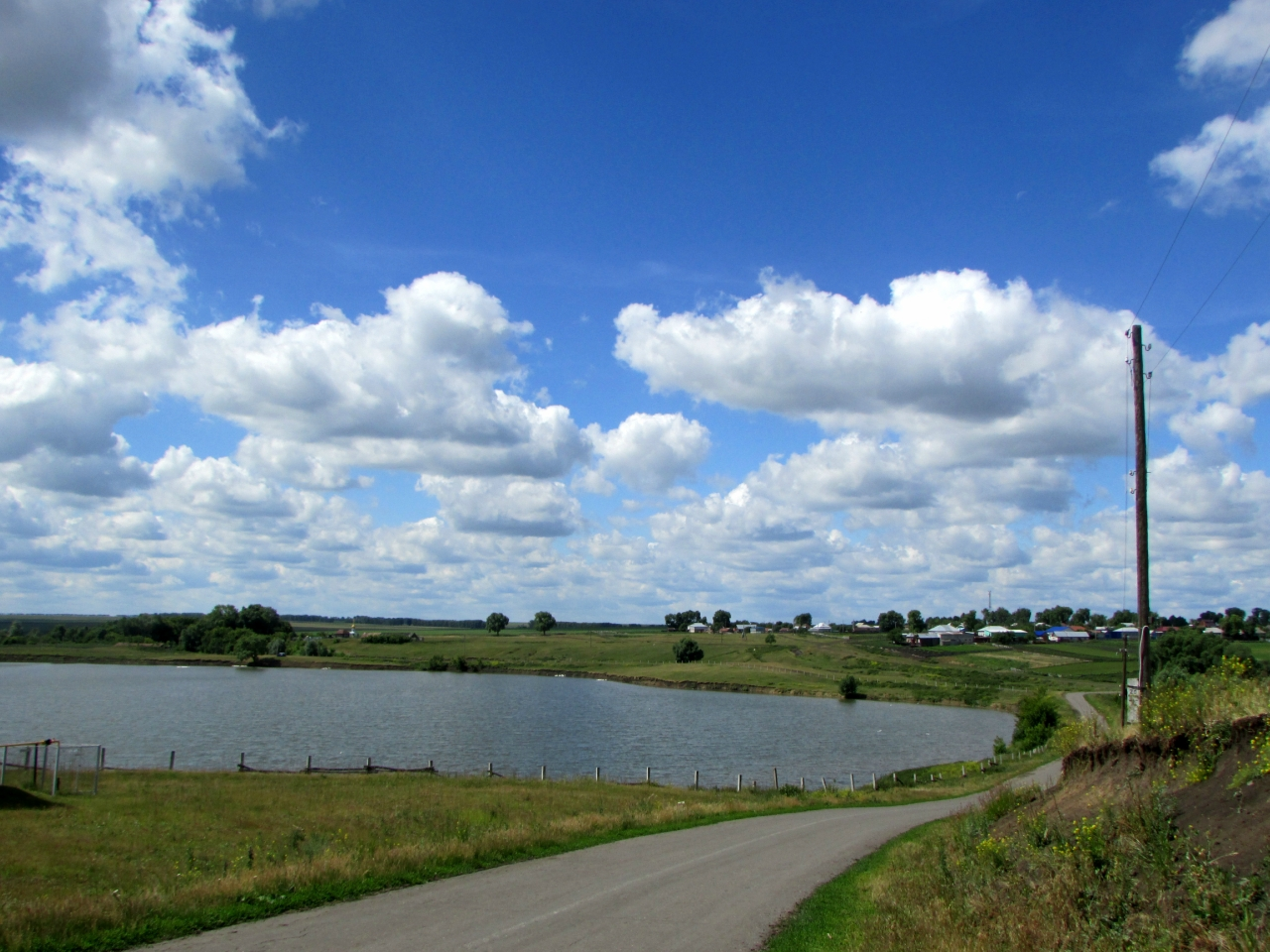
- White Lake, Yalchiksky District

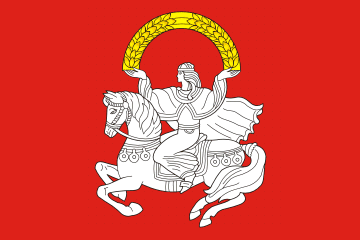
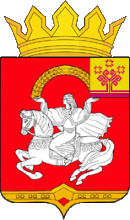
- Flag Coat of arms
- Location of Yalchiksky District in the Chuvash Republic
- Coordinates: 55.134°N 47.629°E
- Country: Russia
- Federal subject: Chuvash Republic
- Established: September 5, 1927
- Administrative center: Yalchiki

Area
  - Total: 567.2 km^{2} (219.0 sq mi)

Population (2010 Census)
  - Total: 20,452
  - Density: 36.06/km^{2} (93.39/sq mi)
  - Urban: 0%
  - Rural: 100%

Administrative structure
  - Administrative divisions: 9 rural settlement
  - Inhabited localities: 53 rural localities

Municipal structure
  - Municipally incorporated as: Yalchiksky Municipal District
  - Municipal divisions: 0 urban settlements, 9 rural settlements
- Time zone: UTC+3 (MSK)
- OKTMO ID: 97655000
- Website: http://gov.cap.ru/main.asp?govid=79

Yalchiksky District (Russian: Я́льчикский райо́н; Chuvash: Елчĕк районӗ, Yelçĕk rayonĕ) is an administrative and municipal district (raion), one of the twenty-one in the Chuvash Republic, Russia. It is located in the southeast of the republic and borders with the Republic of Tatarstan in the north, south, and east, Komsomolsky District in the west, and with Batyrevsky District in the southwest. The area of the district is 567.2 square kilometers (219.0 sq mi). Its administrative center is the rural locality (a selo) of Yalchiki. Population: 20,452 (2010 census); 25,033 (2002 census); 28,549 (1989 Soviet census); 35,200 (1979 Census). The population of Yalchiki accounts for 12.4% of the district's total population.

== History ==
The district was established on September 5, 1927.

== Demographics ==
97% of the population are Chuvash.
