= Vurnarsky District =

Vurnarsky District Вурнарский район (Russian)
- District

Other transcription(s)
  - Chuvash: Вăрнар районӗ
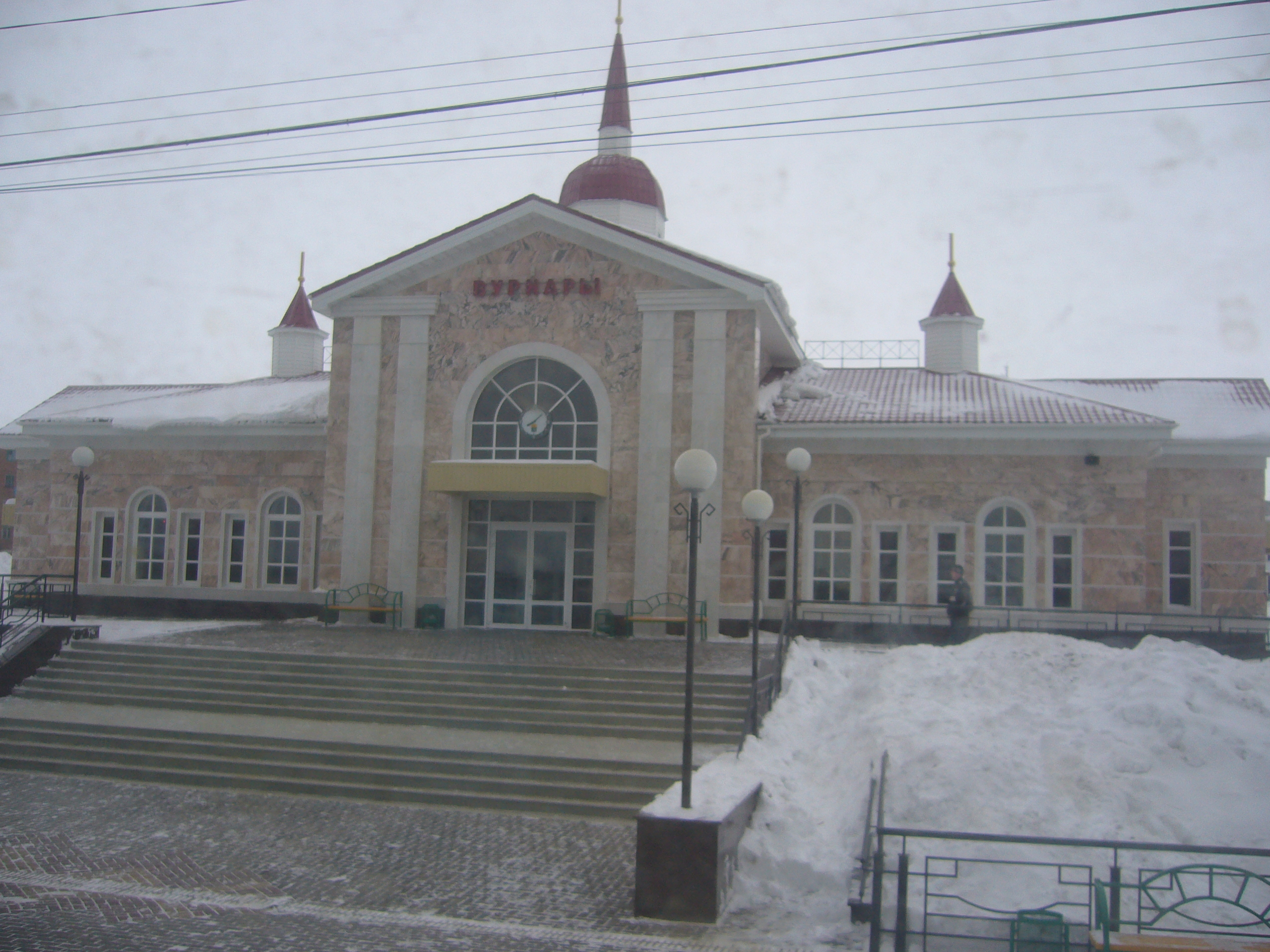
- Vurnary railstation, Kanash-Arzamas rail road, Vurnarsky District

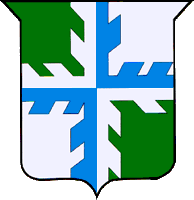
- Flag Coat of arms
- Location of Vurnarsky District in the Chuvash Republic
- Coordinates: 55°37′N 46°55′E
- Country: Russia
- Federal subject: Chuvash Republic
- Established: 1927
- Administrative center: Vurnary

Area
  - Total: 1,012.6 km^{2} (391.0 sq mi)

Population (2010 Census)
  - Total: 35,850
  - Density: 35.40/km^{2} (91.70/sq mi)
  - Urban: 28.1%
  - Rural: 71.9%

Administrative structure
  - Administrative divisions: 1 Urban settlements, 18 Rural settlements
  - Inhabited localities: 1 urban-type settlements, 101 rural localities

Municipal structure
  - Municipally incorporated as: Vurnarsky Municipal District
  - Municipal divisions: 1 urban settlements, 18 rural settlements
- Time zone: UTC+3 (MSK)
- OKTMO ID: 97610000
- Website: http://gov.cap.ru/main.asp?govid=59

Vurnarsky District (Russian: Вурна́рский райо́н; Chuvash: Вăрнар районӗ, Vărnar rayonĕ) is an administrative and municipal district (raion), one of the twenty-one in the Chuvash Republic, Russia. It is located in the center of the republic and borders with Alikovsky and Krasnoarmeysky Districts in the north, Kanashsky District in the east, Ibresinsky District in the south, and with Shumerlinsky District in the west. The area of the district is 1,012.6 square kilometers (391.0 sq mi). Its administrative center is the urban locality (an urban-type settlement) of Vurnary. Population: 35,850 (2010 census); 41,417 (2002 census); 44,864 (1989 Soviet census). The population of Vurnary accounts for 28.1% of the district's total population.

== Notable people ==
- Maxim Mikhailov (1893–1971), operatic bass singer, born in Koltsovka
- Praski Vitti (born 1936), Chuvash painter, born in the village of Algazino
