= Anish (river) =

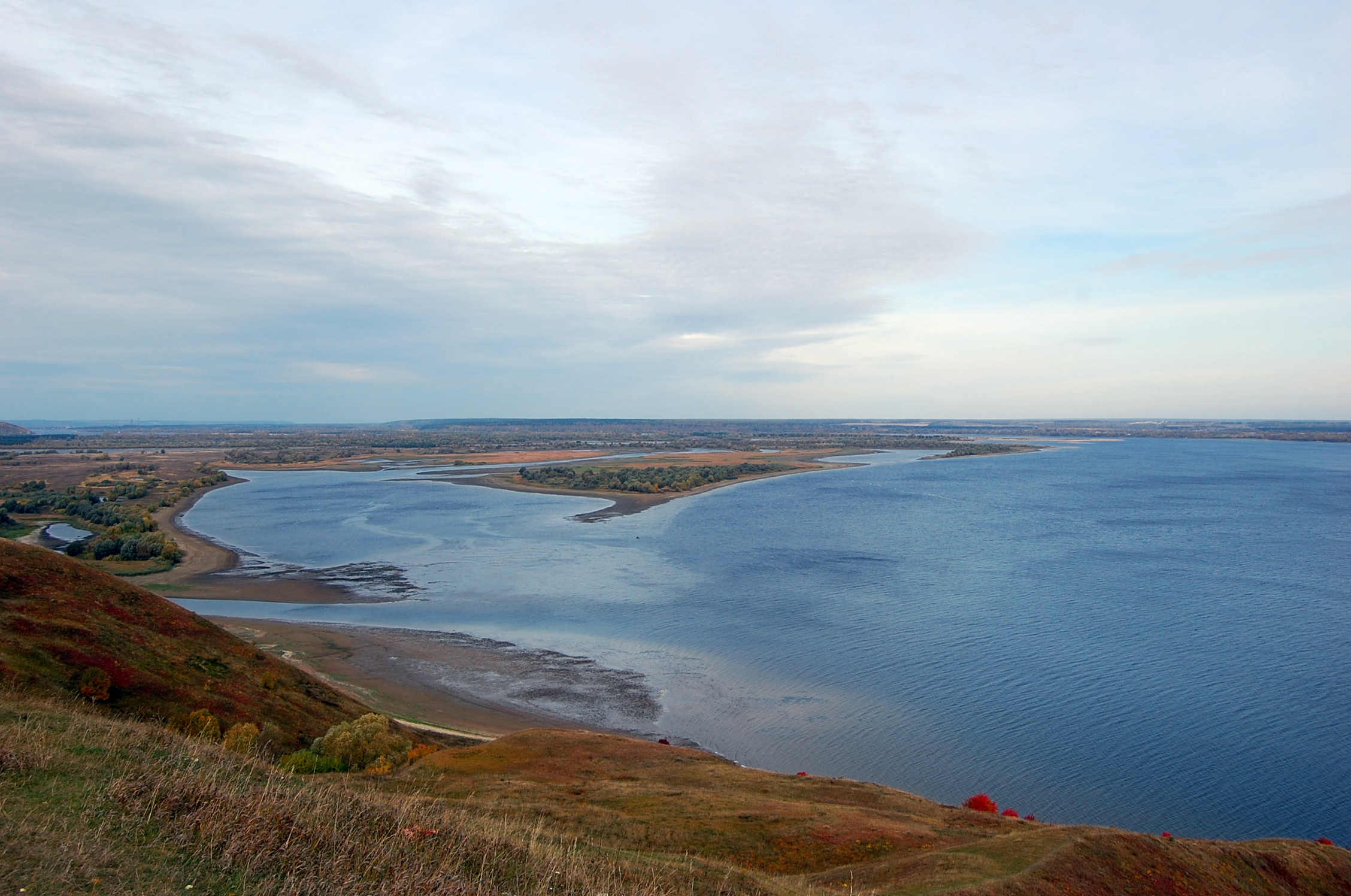

- Location of mouth in Russia

Location
- Country: Russia
- Republic: Chuvashia

Physical characteristics
- Mouth: Volga
  - location: Kuybyshev Reservoir near Kozlovka
  - coordinates: 55.87504°N 48.1967°E
  - elevation: 53 m (174 ft)
- Length: 59 km (37 mi)
- Basin size: 904 km^{2} (349 sq mi)

Basin features
- Progression: Volga→ Caspian Sea

The Anish (Russian: Аниш, Chuvash: Энĕш, Enĕş) is a river in Tsivilsky and Kozlovsky Districts of the Republic of Chuvashia, Russia, a right-bank tributary of the Volga. Its length is 59 kilometers (37 mi) and its drainage basin is 904 square kilometers (349 sq mi). It falls into the Kuybyshev Reservoir, Volga, near Kozlovka.
