= Union of the Writers of the Chuvash Republic =

Union of the Chuvash writers
- Union of the Writers of the Chuvash Republic
- Чӑваш Республикин ҫыравҫӑсен пӗрлешӗвӗ
- Founded: June 30, 1923
- Headquarters: 16 Bldg, Leningradskaya Str., Cheboksary
- Location: Chuvash Republic Russian Federation
- Members: 100
- Key people: Yuhma Mishshi

Union of Writers Chuvash Republic (in 1992–2001 – Union of the Chuvash Writers) — The Writers' Union of the Chuvash Republic – public creative organization for writers living in the Chuvash Republic, as well as writers, writing in the Chuvash language.

== Structure of the organization ==
The Writers' Union of the Chuvash Republic has five of its branches: in the cities of Mariinsky Posad (head – V. Saveliev-Saruy), in Novocheboksarsk (head – V.P. Pugachev), in Ulyanovsk (head – N.N. Larionov), in the villages: of Urmary (head-N.I. Ivanov Parhatar) in Batyrevo (head – V.V. Vladimirov).

== History ==
On June 30, 1923 at the meeting of workers of the Chuvash book publishers and employees of the newspaper "Kanash" was established the Chuvash writers Community (Union Chuvash writers and journalists). Charter of the organization was approved July 1, 1923. The founders were writers Nikolai Yut, N. Patman, Nikolay Shooboushynni, S. Khoomma, S. Lashman and others.

After the creation in 1934 of the Union of Soviet Writers, Community of the Chuvash writers and journalists has been transformed into the Union of Writers of the Chuvash Autonomous Soviet Socialist Republic. This Union has worked until 1991.

In 1991 the Union was a split in two organizations: the Union of Writers of the Chuvash Republic (is registered by the Ministry of Justice of the Chuvash Republic at 4 January 1992) and the Union of Chuvash Writers (20 February 1992). Both organizations on an equal footing are the legal successors of the Chuvash Autonomous Soviet Socialist Republic of the Union of Writers.

In autumn 2001 the Writers Union of the Chuvash Republic was divided into two parts: the Union of Writers of Chuvash Republic "Hurantash" and the Union of the Professional Writers of the Chuvash Republic.

To maintain continuity and Commonwealth Writers' Association of Writers, the Union of the Chuvash Writers registered in the Ministry of Justice as the Union of the Writers of the Chuvash Republic.

== Chairs ==
Chairman of Union of Chuvash Writers
	Tenure	Name	Role
1.	1923–1925	Nikolai Yut	Chairman
2.	1925–1933	Arcady Aris	Chairman
3.	1933–1934	Nikolay Shooboushynni	Chairman
4.	1934	Danilof N.F.	Chairman
5.	1935	Danilof D.D.	Chairman
6.	1935–1936	Anrew Petoki	Chairman
7.	1937–1939	Ouip Mishshi	Chairman
8.	1940–1944	Askhel, Arcady	Chairman
9.	1944–1946	Ille Toktash	Chairman
10.	1950–1952	Agakof Leonid	Chairman
11.	1952–1954	Ouip Mishshi	Chairman
12.	1954–1958	Alexey Talvir	Chairman
13.	1958–1960	Khouzangy Piter	Chairman
14.	1960–1967	Alexader Alga	Chairman
15.	1967–1978	Dedushkin N.S.	Chairman
16.	1978–1986	Alexey Yemelianof	Chairman
17.	1986–1990	Porfiry Afanasief	Chairman
18	1990–1991	Krasnov, Georgy	Chairman
19	1991 –present	Youkhma Mishshi	Chairman

== See also ==
- Simbirsk Chuvash School
- Chuvash national symbols
