= Mariinsky =

Mariinsky (masculine), Mariinskaya (feminine), or Mariinskoye (neuter) may refer to:

== Mariinsky Theatre ==
- Mariinsky Theatre in St. Petersburg, Russia, and the ensembles headquartered there:
  - Mariinsky Ballet
  - Mariinsky Opera
  - Mariinsky Orchestra
  - Mariinsky Academy of Young Singers; see soloist Eleonora Vindau
- its concert hall, the Mariinsky Theatre Concert Hall
- its second stage, the Mariinsky-2

== Other ==
- Mariinsky, Republic of Bashkortostan, a selo in Otradovsky Selsoviet of Sterlitamaksky District, Republic of Bashkortostan
- Mariinsky District, a district of Kemerovo Oblast, Russia
- Mariinsky Hospital, a hospital in Meshchansky District, Moscow, Russia
- Mariinsky Palace, a neoclassical imperial palace in St. Petersburg, Russia
- Mariinskoye Urban Settlement, a municipal formation within the Mariinsky Municipal District

== See also ==
- Mariinsko-Posadsky (disambiguation)
- Mariinsky Posad, a town in the Chuvash Republic, Russia
- Marfo-Mariinsky Convent
- Mariinskyi (disambiguation)
