= Tsivilsky =

Tsivilsky (masculine), Tsivilskaya (feminine), or Tsivilskoye (neuter) may refer to:

- Tsivilsky District, a district of the Chuvash Republic
- Tsivilskoye Urban Settlement, an administrative division and a municipal formation which the town of Tsivilsk in Tsivilsky District of the Chuvash Republic, Russia is incorporated as
