= Urmarsky District =

Urmarsky District Урмарский район (Russian)
- District

Other transcription(s)
  - Chuvash: Вăрмар районӗ
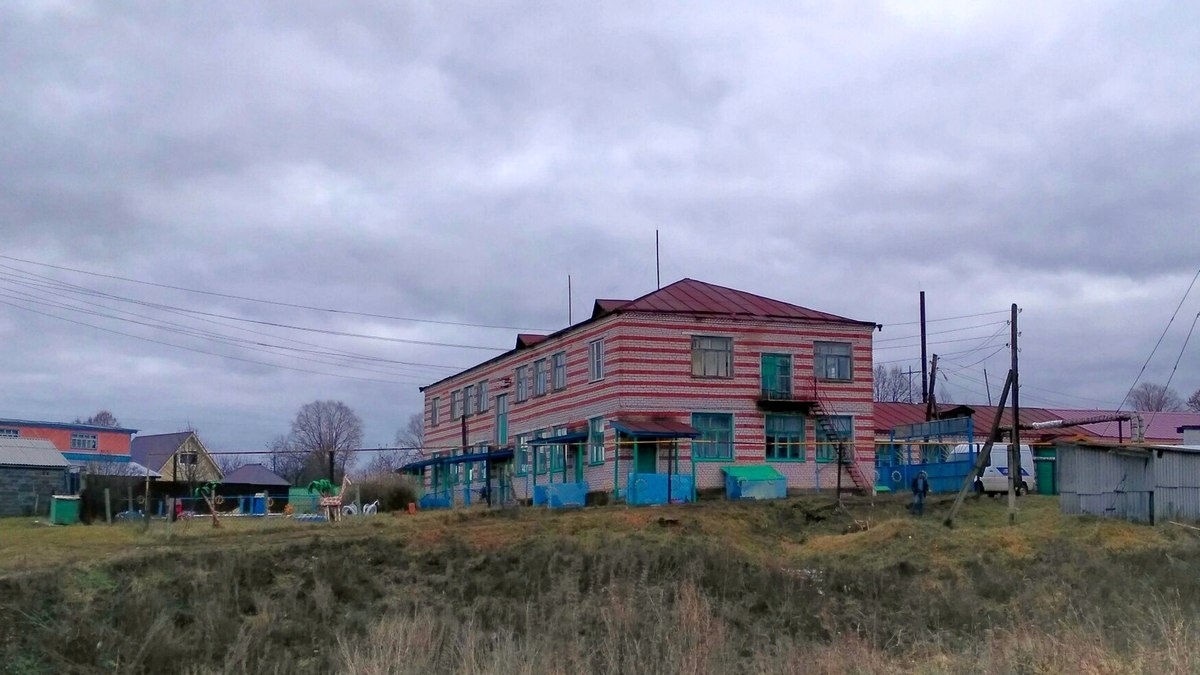
- Children's school in Kudesner, Urmarsky District

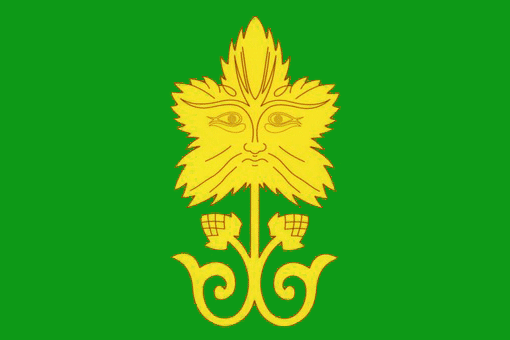
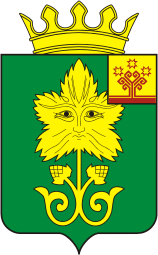
- Flag Coat of arms
- Location of Urmarsky District in the Chuvash Republic
- Coordinates: 55.661°N 47.606°E
- Country: Russia
- Federal subject: Chuvash Republic
- Established: September 5, 1927
- Administrative center: Urmary

Area
  - Total: 598.3 km^{2} (231.0 sq mi)

Population (2010 Census)
  - Total: 25,189
  - Density: 42.10/km^{2} (109.0/sq mi)
  - Urban: 22.5%
  - Rural: 77.5%

Administrative structure
  - Administrative divisions: 1 Urban settlements, 15 Rural settlements
  - Inhabited localities: 1 urban-type settlements, 51 rural localities

Municipal structure
  - Municipally incorporated as: Urmarsky Municipal District
  - Municipal divisions: 1 urban settlements, 15 rural settlements
- Time zone: UTC+3 (MSK)
- OKTMO ID: 97538000
- Website: http://gov.cap.ru/main.asp?govid=73

Urmarsky District (Russian: Урма́рский райо́н; Chuvash: Вăрмар районӗ, Vărmar rayonĕ) is an administrative and municipal district (raion), one of the twenty-one in the Chuvash Republic, Russia. It is located in the northeast of the republic and borders with Kozlovsky District in the north, Tsivilsky District in the northwest, Yantikovsky District in the south, and with Kanashsky District in the west. The area of the district is 598.3 square kilometers (231.0 sq mi). Its administrative center is the urban locality (an urban-type settlement) of Urmary. Population: 25,189 (2010 census); 28,189 (2002 census); 29,868 (1989 Soviet census). The population of Urmary accounts for 22.5% of the district's total population.

== History ==
The district was established on 5 September 1927. The well-known Chuvash author and literary critic Dimitri Isayev was born in Kovali, Urmarsky District.

== Demographics ==
97% of the population is ethnic Chuvash.
