= Arcady Aris =

Chuvash writer and literary critic

- Born: Arkady Ivanovich Zolotov; January 29, 1901; Siner, Yadrinsky Uyezd, Kazan Governorate, Russian Empire
- Died: June 1, 1942 (aged 41); Ilansky, Krasnoyarsk Krai, RSFSR, Soviet Union
- Occupations: Writer, literary critic
- Writing career
- Pen name: Arcady Aris
- Language: Chuvash, Russian

Arcady Ivanovich Aris (Chuvash: Аркадий Иванович Арис; January 29, 1901 – June 1, 1942) was a Chuvash writer and literary critic. He became a member of the USSR Union of Writers in 1934.

He was a cousin of the Chuvash folklorist Nikolai Yut.

== Biography ==
Arkady Zolotov was born in the village of Siner, Kazan Governorate, Russian Empire on January 29, 1901.

After graduating from the Alikovskaya two-year school, in 1915 he entered the Simbirsk Chuvash school to study. Here he first became acquainted with the works of K. V. Ivanov, T. S. Semyonov (Tayar Timkki), N. V. Vasiliev (Shupussinni) and decided to devote himself to Chuvash literature.

From the first days of Soviet rule Zolotov took an active part in public life. In April 1919, together with his brothers, Arseny and Nikolay, he entered the volunteer 7th Simbirsk rifle regiment and as a part of this regiment in 1919–1920 under legendary N.S.Kosmovsky's command participated in difficult fights near Orenburg, Iletsky and Uralsk. While at the front he entered the Bolshevik party.

Having come back from front Arcady Ivanovich successfully graduated from the institute on preparation of teachers in 1922.

In 1922 Arcady moved to Cheboksary. In 1928–1931 he was the editor of the newspaper "Kanash" (Forum) and the magazine "Сунтал" (Anvil), during the same time he headed the day-to-day affairs of the magazine "Trap" and took an active part in the creation and expansion of a radio network of broadcasting in Chuvashia, while participating in the publication of the magazine "Tractor" (in the future known as "Tăvan Atăl").

In 1934 the Chuvash writers and journalists elect him as delegate to the First All-Union congress of writers where he presented an article on the development of Chuvash literature.

After N. Ja. Zolotov's departure to Leningrad to the Academy of Sciences, Arcady Ivanovich at one time headed the board of the Union of Writers of Chuvashia. In 1934 he was admitted to the USSR Writers' Union.

He was arrested on October 23, 1937 and detained in the NKVD prison of the ChASSR. On June 1, 1942, Arcady Aris died in the prison camp Tagillag in Ilansky, Krasnoyarsk Krai at the age of 41 years. He was posthumously rehabilitated (exonerated) on 9 April 1955.

== Literary activity ==
Arkady Ivanovich is considered one of founders of the Chuvash literary criticism. He is known primarily as the author of articles on theoretical issues of the Chuvash Soviet literature. Of great interest are his articles: 1926 - "Where are we going?" (“Ăçtalla kayatpăr?”), 1929 — “On the Way of Testing the Forces of Chuvash Literature” (“Chăvash Literary Pultarăkhne Tĕrĕslev çulĕ çinche”), 1933 — “Urgent Issues of Fiction” (“Ilemlĕ Literary Payankhi ytăvĕsem”), 1935 - "For the sharpness and culture of the language" ("Chĕlhe çivĕchlĕkhĕshĕn, chĕlhe kulturishen"), etc.

He translated into Chuvash "My universities" (M.Gorky) and "Chapayev" (D.Furmanov).

== Literature ==
- Leo Efimov, Alikovsky Encyclopedia, Chuvash book publishing house, Cheboksary, 2009.
- L. I. Yefimov, "Alikovsky District" ("Элӗк Енӗ"), Alikovo, 1994.
- Zolotov A.A., Murakhaeva (Zolotova) S.A., "Принципам не изменили" / We did not change the principles, Alikovo-Cheboksary, 1898.

== Links ==
- Золотов Аркадий Иванович
- Знатные люди Чувашии: Аркадий Иванович Золотов
