= Simbirsk Chuvash teacher's school =

School in Ulyanovsk Oblast, Russia

Simbirsk Chuvash teacher's school (Russian: Симбирская чувашская учительская школа, Chuvash: Чӗмпӗрти чӑваш вӗрентӳҫиҫен шкулӗ) is the training center for the creative intelligentsia of the Chuvash and other peoples of the Volga region. Center founded educator of Chuvash people I. Y. Yakovlev, October 28, 1868 in Simbirsk, the administrative center of the homonymous province.

== History ==
In 1868, Ivan Yakovlev schoolboy at his apartment in Simbirsk began to teach Chuvash children. In 1871, the Ministry of Education gives official status Simbirsk Chuvash school. After nine years, it is converted to a teacher-training college. Great contribution to its formation and development have I. Ulyanov, who worked in the 1869–1886 years Director and inspector of schools Simbirsk province, as well as Vishevsky I.V., Ilminsky N.I., Shestanov P. D.

== Famous graduates ==
- Nikolai Yut – Chuvash writer, Chairman of the Union of Chuvash writers (1923-1925)
- Arcady Aris – Chuvash writer, Chairman of the Union of Chuvash writers (1925-1933)
- Maximof-Koshkinsky, Joachim S. – the organizer of the Chuvash professional theater, the studio "Chuvashkino".
- Konstantin Vasilyevich Ivanov – Chuvash poet, classic of the Chuvash literature.

== Gallery ==
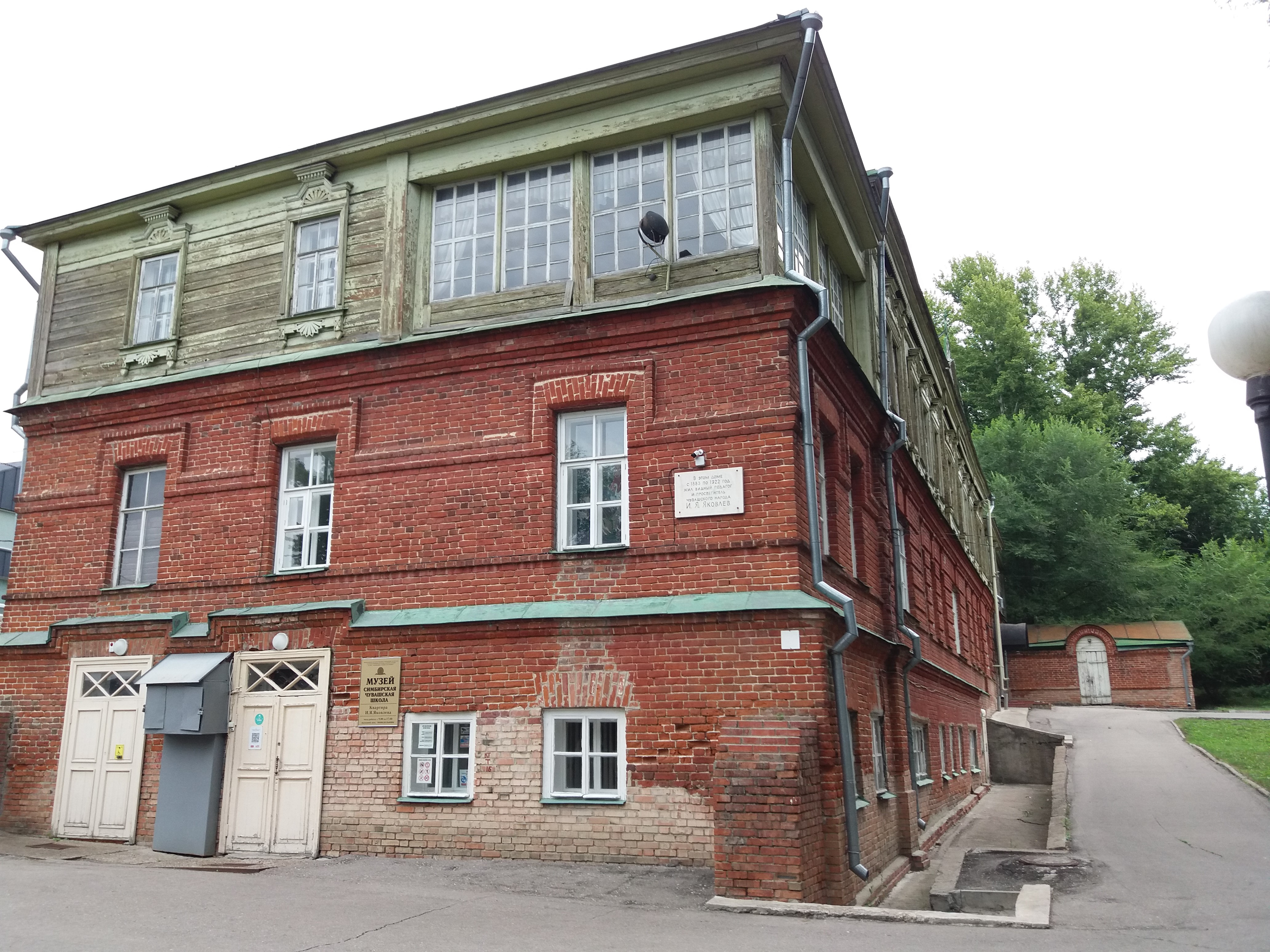
Museum of the Chuvash School.

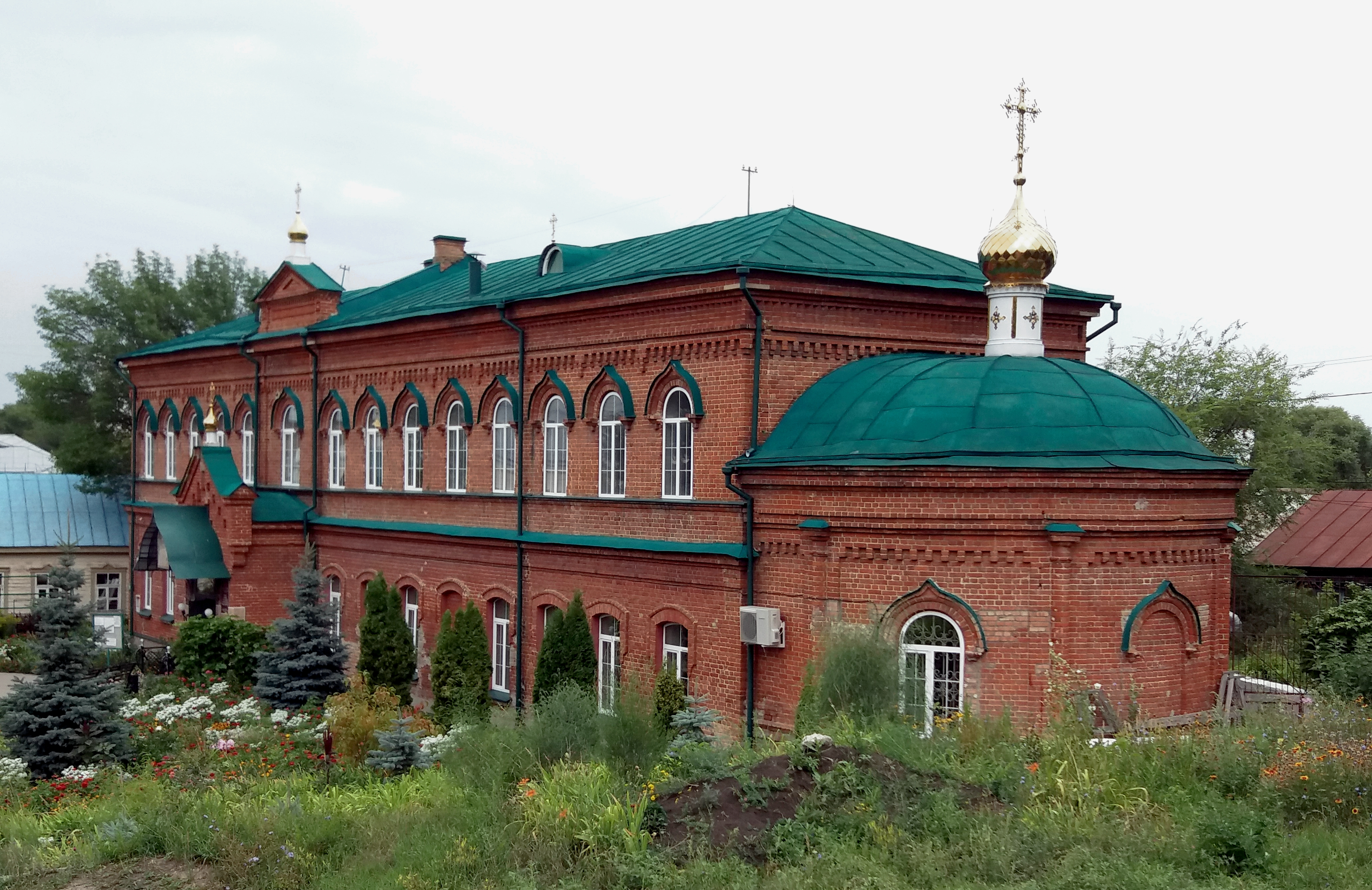
Museum of the Chuvash School.

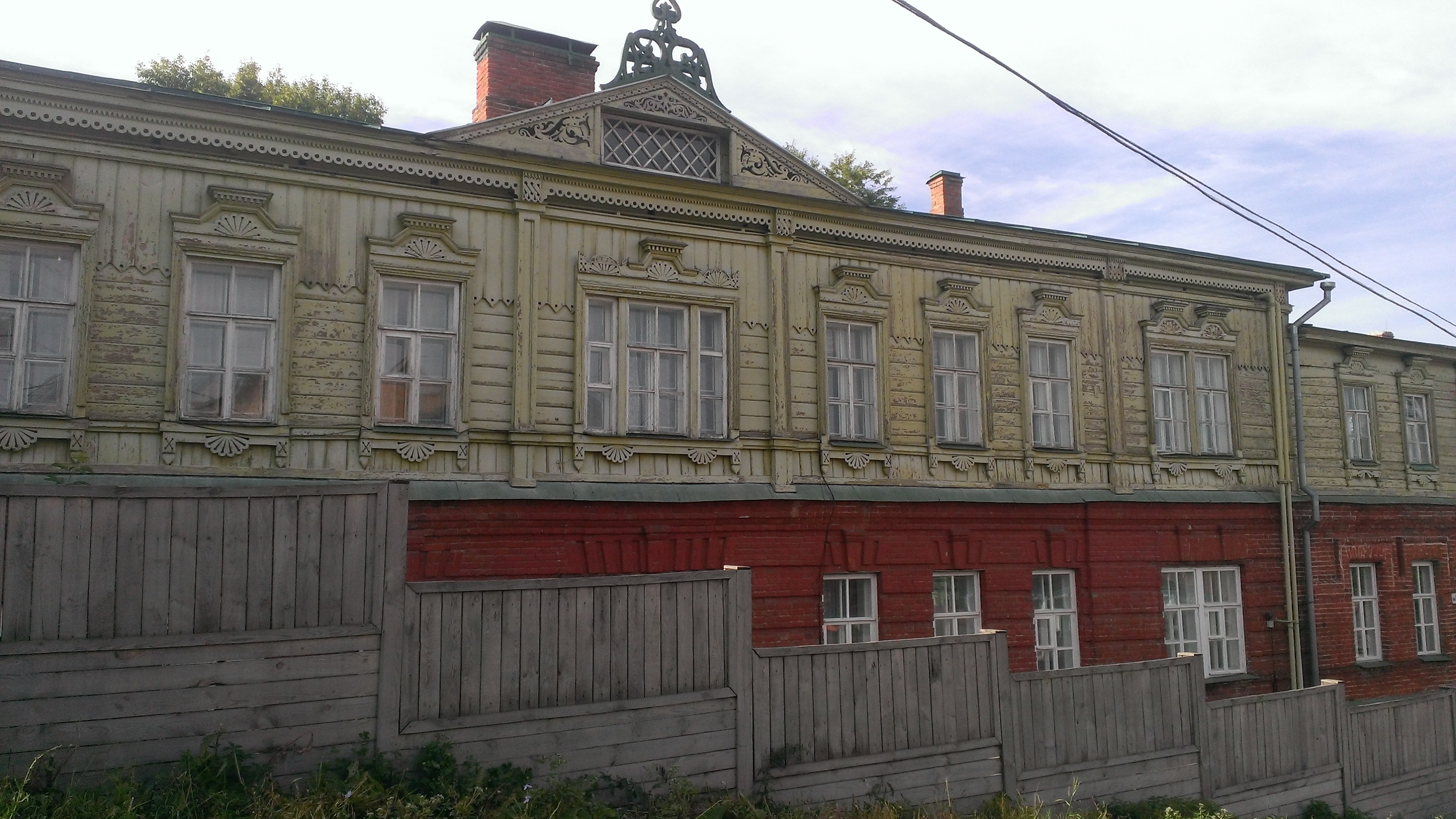
Building of the girls' department of the school and the apartment of I. Ya. Yakovlev.

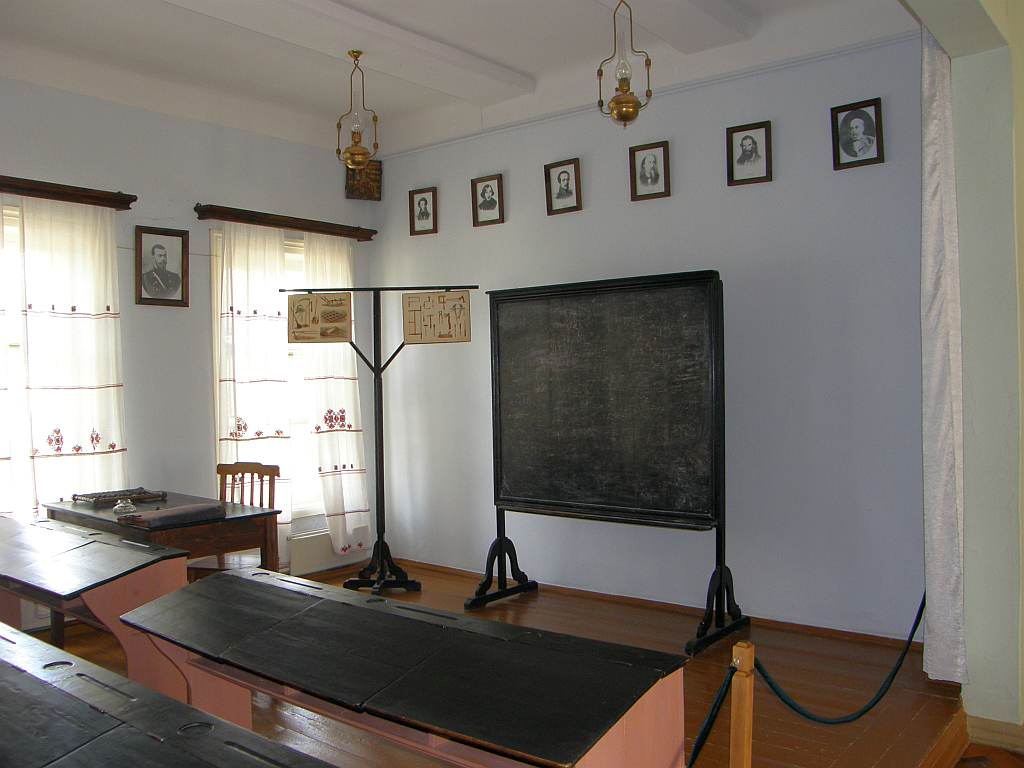
Interior of a classroom of the girls' school.

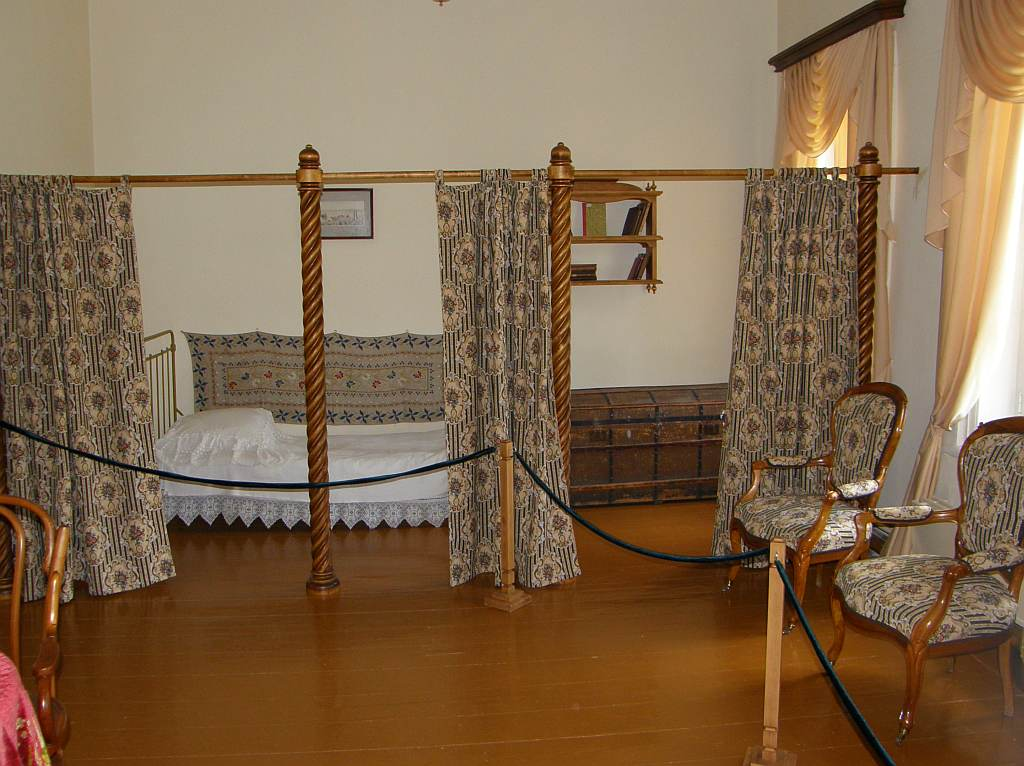
Ivan Yakovlevich's room in the apartment at the Simbirsk Chuvash School.

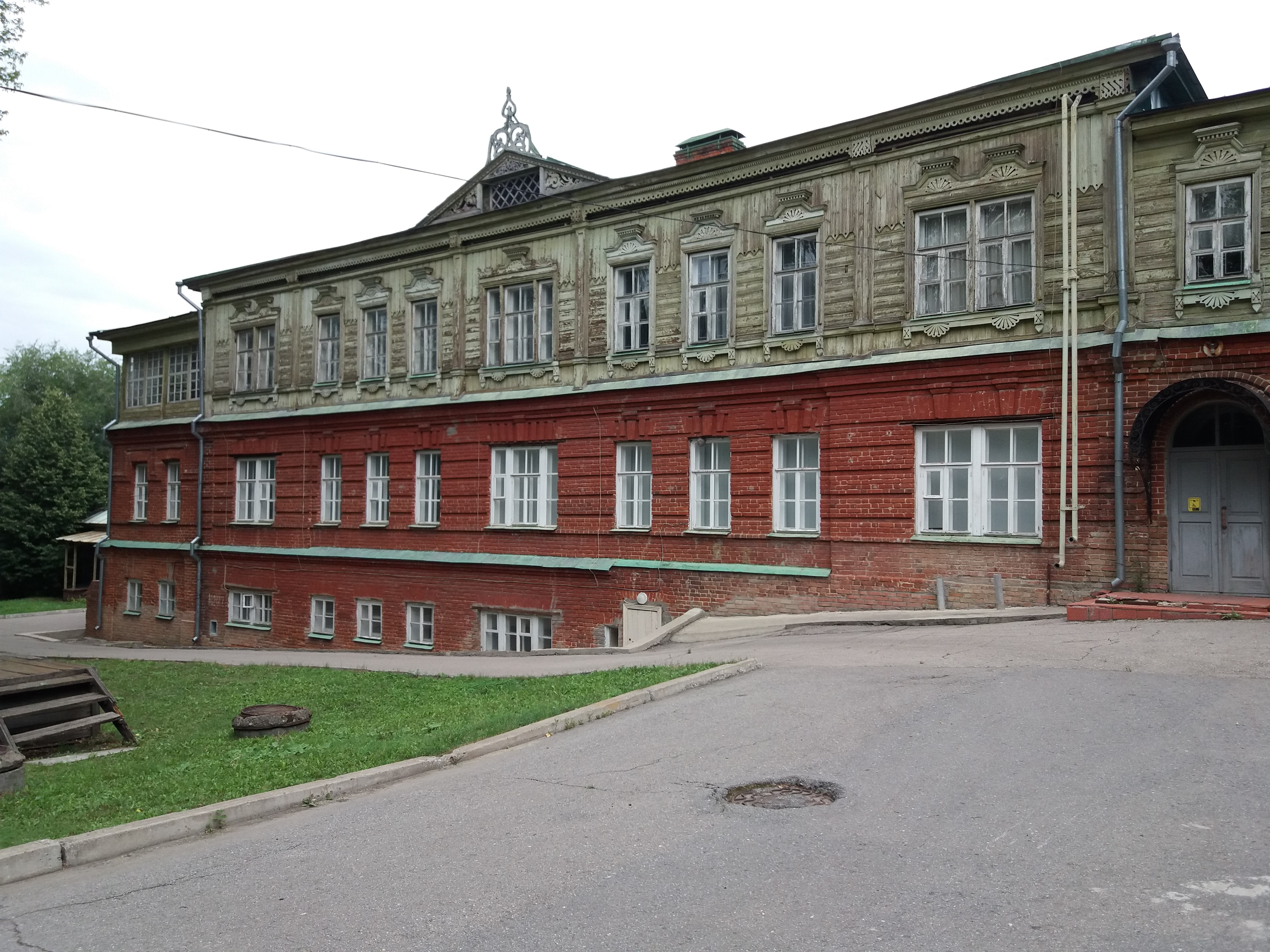
Museum of the Chuvash School.

== Literature ==
- Яковлев И. Я. Война и чувашская школа в Симбирске. Симбирск : типо-лит. Губ.правл., 1915. — 30 с
- Петров М. П. Симбирская чувашская учительская школа и И. Я. Яковлев. — Чебоксары, 1928.
- Андреева З. А. Иван Яковлевич Яковлев и Симбирская чувашская школа. — Чебоксары, 1949. — 144 с.
- Яковлев И. Я. Симбирская учительская школа и ее роль в просвещении чуваш / Под ред. М. Я. Сироткина; Науч.-исслед. ин-т языка, литературы, истории и экономики при Сов. Мин. Чуваш. АССР. Чебоксары :Чувашгосиздат, 1959. — 144 с
- Муромцев Н. В. Симбирская чувашская учительская школа : (к 100-летию осн.перв. чуваш. пед. учеб. заведения и 120-летию его основателя — И. Я. Яковлева) / М-во высш. и сред. спец. образования РСФСР; Чуваш. гос. ун-т им. И. Н. Ульянова; Науч.-исслед. ин-т при Совете Министров Чуваш. АССР. — Чебоксары, 1968. — 44 с.
- Иван Яковлевич Яковлев и его школа : Итоги юбил. науч. сессии, посвященной 120-летию со дня рождения И. Я. Яковлева и 100-летию Симбирской чувашской учительской школы : Сборник статей. — Чебоксары : Чувашкнигоиздат, 1971. — 303 с.
- Яковлев И. Я. симбирская центральная чувашская школа : материалы научн. конф. — Чебоксары, 1997. — 58 с
- Краснов Н. Г. Иван Яковлев и его потомки : посвящ. 150-летию со дня рождения чувашского педагога-просветителя. — Чебоксары : Чуваш. кн. изд-во, 1998. 353 c.
- Димитриев В. Д. Просветитель чувашского народа И. Я. Яковлев : сборник статей. — Чебоксары : Изд-во ЧГУ, 2002. — 140 с.
- Агаева Е.В., Сергеев Т.С. Симбирская чувашская школа – центр подготовки творческой интеллигенции // Фундаментальные исследования. – 2009. – No. 7. – С. 84–85;
