= Dimitri Isayev =

Dimitri Isayev may refer to:

- Dimitri Isayev (1905–1930), Chuvash writer and critic
- Dimitri Isayev (born 1973), Russian actor
