= Nikolai Yut =

Chuvash writer, folklorist and literary critic

Nikolai Yout
- Born: Zolotov Nikolai Jákovlevič; July 30, 1898; Siner village, Russia
- Died: March 27, 1967 (aged 68); Shumerlya, Chuvashia, USSR
- Occupations: Writer, poet, folklorist and literary critic
- Writing career
- Pen name: Nikolai Yout
- Language: Chuvash, Russian

Nikolai Yakovlevich Yut (Chuvash: Николай Ют, Nikolay Yut; Russian: Николай Яковлевич Ют; July 30, 1898 – March 27, 1967) was a Chuvash writer, folklorist and literary critic. He became a member of the USSR Union of Writers in 1934. He was the cousin of the Chuvash writer and literature critic Arcady Aris.

== Biography ==
Nikolai Yut was born in the village of Siner (now in Alikovsky District, Chuvash Republic), Russia.

He graduated from the Simbirsk Chuvash teacher's school. Then went to study at the Communist University of the East, successfully passing a course graduate studies, Institute of History of Material Culture of the USSR.

Nikolai Yut ran the newspaper Kanash. In 1923–25 he headed the Writers' Union of Chuvashia. In his literary critical articles repulsed by the vulgar-sociological approach to the phenomena of literature (poetry about Shelebi N., P. Huzangay, etc.).

For criticism of sloppiness and retreat from the positions of some Communist Party Zolotov was accused of discrediting the members of the regional committee and expelled from the party. However, the CRC of the RCP (b) reversed the decision of the plenum of the Chuvash regional committee.

In the same twenty-fifth year, he received an invitation to work at the Academy of Sciences. He was editor of the newspaper Kanash, the magazine Suntal (Anvil), as well as chairman of the Writers' Union was replaced by Arkady I. Zolotov.

In 1933 with his family he moved from Leningrad to Bashkiria. Powered Bizhbulyaksky first secretary of the district organization of the CPSU (b).

In August 1937 the newspaper "Krasnaya Chuvashia" an article by Sergei Slavin, where one has been criticized in the literature reviews of NY Zolotov, who, in my opinion, to praise the play of counter-revolutionary content. Following the publication appeared on the anti-Soviet propaganda newspaper "Kanash" in the twenties.

In March, at a meeting of Party activists in Cheboksary authorized by the CPC in the VKP (b) of the Chuvash ASSR M. Sakhyanova called for revolutionary vigilance, pointed to the emergence of "idiotic disease – complacency," lectured the chief of the Office of Arts AI Zolotov, who "no charge against him, did not recognize".

Second Secretary Bizhbulyaksksky District's Party Committee, after reading it, send to the NKVD, the CPC Provincial Committee and authorized accusation that Nikoai Zolotov, a former employee of the newspaper "Kanash" – a counter-revolutionary.

September 21 H. Yushunev Cheboksary publishes an article that criticizes AI Zolotov and his associates, including the DS and the Elmen NY Zolotov, identifying them to "double-dealer," "cunning bourgeois geek" "tortskistskim leader," "inveterate nationalists". October 9 T. Vasiliev in the article "Once again about the bourgeois nationalists" leads the names: FT Timofeev, T. M. Matveev, N. Ia Zolotov.

In the five pre-trial detention he was never summoned to court. In prison he met Tsivilsk cousin Arcady. Seriously ill, Arcady Ivanovich said that the charges against him that he was invited to Cheboksary Gorky to kill. Arcady is terribly depressing:

You can not imagine how I loved Gorky. And then they tell me ... What a shame!

Then there was a meeting of Communists Bizhbulyak District. Following the instructions of Zhdanov ("terror pests") VA Orlov, N. Yushuneva repeats the words ("Zolotov – the leader of the counter-revolution in Cheboksary"). Later, in 1955, he acknowledged that he slandered Zolotov, under pressure from the NKVD.

In Bashkiria under investigation Nikolai Zolotov held annually. All allegations of anti-Soviet activity in BASSR he took one after another. It remains to take charge during the period of work in Chuvash ASSR. On stage: in Cheboksary, then Tsivilsk.

In December 1943, he was released from prison. His patient bilateral pneumonia, at the station in Tagil, who went to meet him is his wife, Mary Zakharovna.

Improve health, he participated in the 1944–1945 Great Patriotic War, fought on the 1st, 2nd Baltic, Leningrad front, and participated in the liquidation of Courland enemy group.

During the investigation of all charges, built on Nikolai Yakovlevich, disappeared. In September 1942, after five years of imprisonment as a prisoner, the decision of the special meeting at People's Commissar of Internal Affairs, Beria, because it is impossible to make the case to the court. Nikoly Zolotov was accused of anti-war propaganda and sentenced to eight years in prison.

Next was Tagillag. The body dried up, began lung disease. Wrote ten statements to send to the front.

Rehabilitated in 1956. Appointed a special pension of national importance. Shortly before his death, traveled all the family, made valuable gifts to be buried in the village Siner, in their native land.

He died in Shumerlya (Chuvash: Çĕмĕрле), Chuvash Republic.

== Literature ==
- Leo Efimov, Alikovsky Encyclopedia, Chuvash book publishing house, Cheboksary, 2009.
- L. I. Yefimov, "Alikovsky District" ("Элӗк Енӗ"), Alikovo, 1994.
- Zolotov A.A., Murakhaeva (Zolotova) S.A., "Принципам не изменили", Alikovo-Cheboksary, 1898.
- Zolotov A.A., Zolotov V. A., Zolotov V. T., "Николалай Яковлевич Золотов. К 110-летию со дня рождения, к 85-летию со дня организации Союза писателей "Канаш", Cheboksary, "Новое время", 2008.
