= Dimitri Isayev (writer) =

Chuvash writer and literary critic

Dimitri Vladimirovich Isayev
- Дмитрий Владимирович Исаев
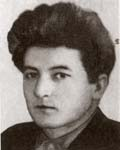
- Дмитрий Владимирович Исаев–Аврель
- Born: 6 June 1905; Kovali, Urmarsky District, Chuvashia
- Died: 18 April 1930 (aged 24); Samara, Russia
- Other name: Авраль Метри
- Occupations: Writer, critic

Dimitri Vladimirovich Isayev (Russian: Дмитрий Владимирович Исаев; 6 June 1905 – 18 April 1930) was a Chuvash writer and literary critic. He was a prolific writer of short stories about the lives of young people in the years just after the Russian Revolution. He mainly wrote in the Chuvash language, and was keen to develop a proletarian Chuvash literature.

== Life ==
Dimitri Vladimirovich Isayev was born on 6 June 1905 in Kovali, Urmarsky District in Chuvashia. He came from a poor peasant family. He completed basic school, then studied at the Communist University of the Toilers of the East in Moscow. He was head of the Komsomol city committee of Cheboksary, the capital city of the Chuvash Republic and a port on the Volga River. He taught social studies at the Central Chuvash Teachers College in Samara, further down the Volga.

Isayev became famous as an author. His first lyric poem was "Юратрӑм" (Loved), published by the magazine Songtao ("Anvil") in 1925. Following this he produced many short stories, essays and travel notes. This work included "Рабфак хӗрӗ" (Rabfakovka), "Отряд" (Detachment), "Ҫулӑмри ял" (Village in flames), "Хура тинӗс хумӗ" (Wave of the Black Sea), "Лисук чӑптаҫӑ" (Rogozhnitsa Lizuk), "Люпук ҫырӑвӗ" (Lyubuk Letter) and "Вӑраннисем" (woken up). His stories portray the turbulent lives of young people in the years just after the Russian Revolution of 1917. He describes their eagerness to develop a good life on the land, their love of the homeland and their work in transforming the villages and towns.

Isayev also wrote several articles of literary criticism. He was in favor of developing a proletarian Chuvasian literature. Isayev was one of the founders of the literary almanac for Chuvash Soviet writers of the Middle Volga Păr tapransan ("Things are moving"), later called Vătam Atăl ("Middle Volga"). He worked for the newspapers Canas ("Council") and Çamrăk hreschen ("Young Communist"), and the magazine Songtao ("Anvil"). In 1929–30 he worked on the Collective Farmer newspaper in Samara. He died on 18 April 1930 in Samara.

== Works ==
Isayev was the author of the books:

- Proletarians literaturishĕn / For proletarian literature (1930)
- Hĕrlĕ hunavsem / Red shoots,
- Çĕnelnĕ yăh / New Generation (1930)
- Pirěn ăru / Our generation (printed in 1947, 1981)

He was the author of several articles of literary criticism, including:

- Young writers and Komsomol
- On poets and poetry
- On the national culture
- Learn from the Russian classics
- Literary creativity Peoples of the USSR

== Writings about Isayev ==
- В. Долгов-Кавалинский (2005). "Долгов-Кавалинский В. Самана юрăçи". Хыпар (in Russian): 28.
- С. Ялавин (1931). "Ялавин С. Исаев Мěтри (Авраль)". Трактор (in Russian): 128–145.
- Афанасьев П. Писатели Чувашии (2006). "Исаев-Авраль Дмитрий Владимирович". П. Афанасьев – Чебоксары (in Russian): 178–179.
- Юрьев М.И. Писатели Советской Чувашии (1988). "Дмитрий Исаев-Авраль (Исаев Дмитрий Владимирович)". М.И. Юрьев, З.В. Романова. - Чебоксары (in Russian): 142.
- М. Юрьев (6 June 1965). "Юрьев М. Образец служения народу". Советская Чувашия (Sovetskaya Chuvashia) (in Russian).
- М. Юрьев (25 December 1975). "Юрьев М. Слово о первом редакторе". Молодой коммунист (Young Communist) (in Russian).

== Sources ==
- "Dimitri Vladimirovich Isayev-Aurelius (Дмитрий Владимирович Исаев–Аврель)" (in Russian). Национальная библиотека Чувашской Республики (National Library of the Chuvash Republic).
- Эзенкин, Валерий Степанович (1992). Теоретические основы чувашской литературной критики, 1917-1970-е гг (in Russian). Изд-во Чувашского университета. ISBN 9785767700707.
- "Исаев-Авраль Метри Дмитрий Владимирович — Биография". «Помни Про» Электронный мемориал (in Russian). Archived from the original on April 24, 2013.
- "ИСАЕВ – АВРАЛЬ Дмитрий Владимирович (1905–1930)", Литературные имена Урмарского района (in Russian), Муниципальное бюджетное учреждение культуры
- "Талантливый прозаик и критик (К 105-летию со дня рождения Д.В. Исаева)" (in Russian). National Library of the Chuvash Republic.
- Тимуков, А.Н. (2014). "Исаев Дмитрий Владимирович (Isaev Dmitry Vladimirovich)" (in Russian). Чувашский государственнвй институт гуманитарных наук.
- Юрьев, Михаил Иванович (1975). Писатели советской Чувашии (in Russian). Чувашское книжное изд-во.
