= Tsivil =

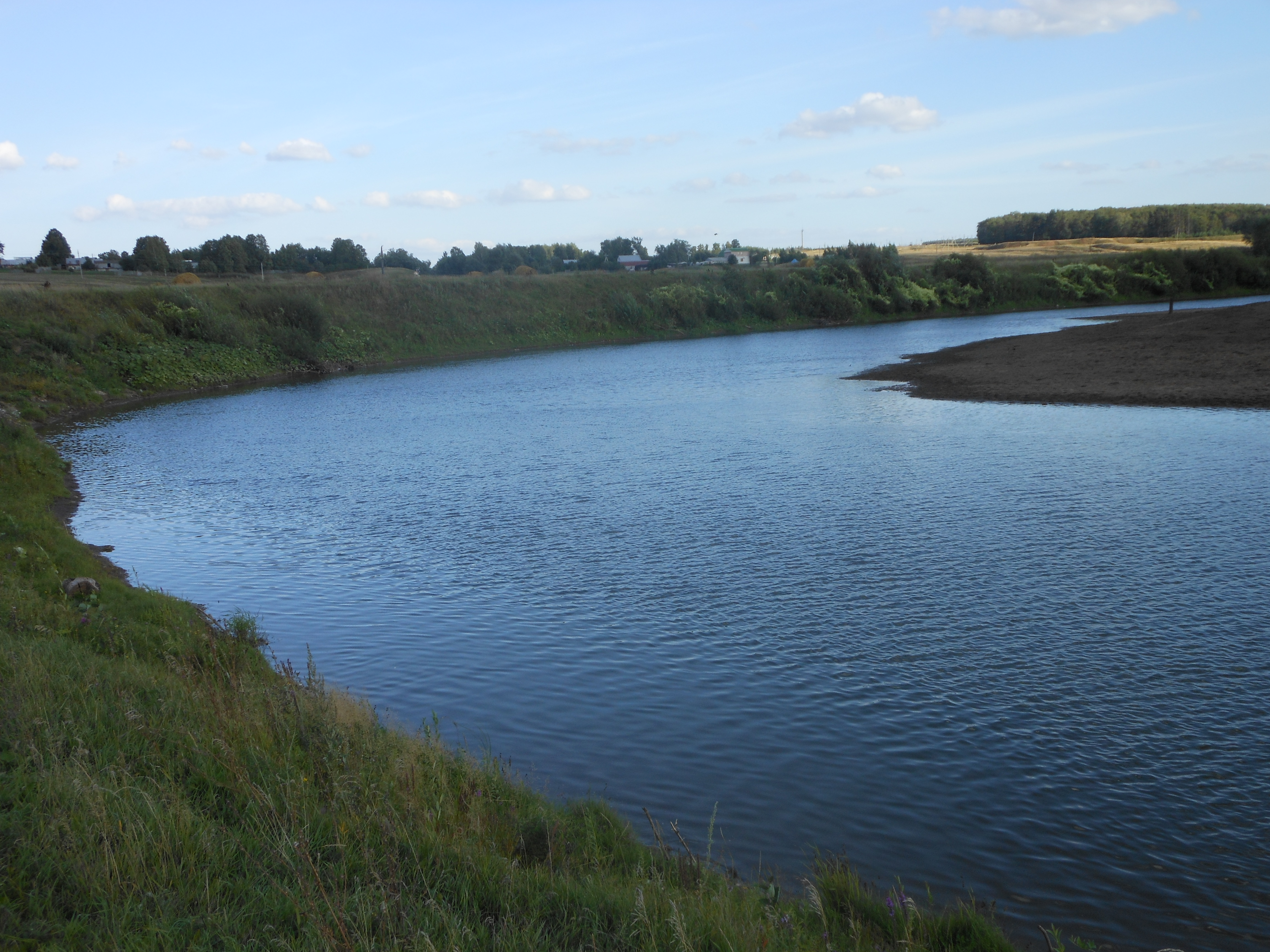

Location
- Country: Chuvashia, Russia

Physical characteristics
- Source
  - location: Shumerlinsky District, Chuvashia
- Mouth: Volga
  - location: near Novocheboksarsk
  - coordinates: 56.1079°N 47.5785°E
  - elevation: 53 m (174 ft)
- Length: 170 km (110 mi)
- Basin size: 4,690 km^{2} (1,810 sq mi)

Basin features
- Progression: Volga→ Caspian Sea

The Great Tsivil (Note: Russian: Большой Цивиль, romanized: Boljšoj Civilj, IPA: [bɐlʲˈʂoj tsʲɪˈvʲilʲ]; Chuvash: Мăн Çавал, romanized: Măn Caval, IPA: [mɒ̆n ɕɐˈʋaɫ]) or simply Tsivil (also spelled Tzivil and Civil /sɪˈvɪl/), is a river in Chuvashia, Russian Federation, a right tributary of the Volga in its lower course. The Tsivil is 170 km (110 mi) long, and its watershed area is 4,690 km^{2} (1,810 sq mi). Near Tsivilsk is the Little Tsivil, which joins the Great Tsivil, forming the river Tsivil; said river flows into the Volga near Novocheboksarsk. Other major tributaries are the Unga and Kuganar. Tsivil's yearly runoff volume is 640,000,000 m^{3} (520,000 acre⋅ft).
