= Shemursha =

Shemursha (Russian: Шемурша) is the name of two rural localities in Russia:

- Shemursha, Chuvash Republic, a selo in the Chuvash Republic
- Shemursha, Ulyanovsk Oblast, a selo in Ulyanovsk Oblast
