= Batyrevo =

Batyrevo (Russian: Батырево) is the name of several rural localities in Russia:

- Batyrevo, Chuvash Republic, a selo in Batyrevskoye Rural Settlement of Batyrevsky District of the Chuvash Republic
- Batyrevo, Kurgan Oblast, a selo in Yarovinsky Selsoviet of Polovinsky District of Kurgan Oblast
- Batyrevo, Grakhovsky District, Udmurt Republic, a village in Loloshur-Vozzhinsky Selsoviet of Grakhovsky District of the Udmurt Republic
- Batyrevo, Kiznersky District, Udmurt Republic, a village in Laka-Tyzhminsky Selsoviet of Kiznersky District of the Udmurt Republic
