= Siner, Chuvash Republic =

Rural locality in Alikovsky District, Russia

Coordinates: 55°44′31″N 46°47′07″E

Seener (Russian: Синерь; Chuvash: Синер) is a rural locality (a village) in Alikovsky District of the Chuvash Republic, Russia, located near the district's administrative center of Alikovo and near the Cheboksary–Alikovo–Krasnye Chetai and Cheboksary–Alikovo–Yadrin auto routes. The population is 135, mostly Chuvash females; it was 248, 224 and 156 in 1926, 1907 and 1859, respectively.

Two small rivers — the Abashyrma and Khelkassy — flow in the vicinity of the village. The village only has one street (Kooperativnaya).

The climate is moderately continental, with long cold winters and warm summers. Average January temperature is −12.9 °C (8.8 °F), average July temperature—18.3 °C (64.9 °F). Absolute recorded minimum temperature is −44 °C (−47 °F), while the absolute recorded maximum is 37 °C (99 °F). Annual average precipitation is 552 millimeters (21.7 in).

== Etymology and history ==
Until 1927, Siner was a part of Alikovskaya Volost of Yadrinsky Uyezd. On November 1, 1927, the village became a part of Alikovsky District. It was transferred to Vurnarsky District on December 20, 1962, but was returned to Alikovsky District on March 14, 1965.

== Notable people ==
- Zolotov's dynasty
