= Kozlovsky District =

Kozlovsky District Козловский район (Russian)
- District

Other transcription(s)
  - Chuvash: Куславкка районӗ
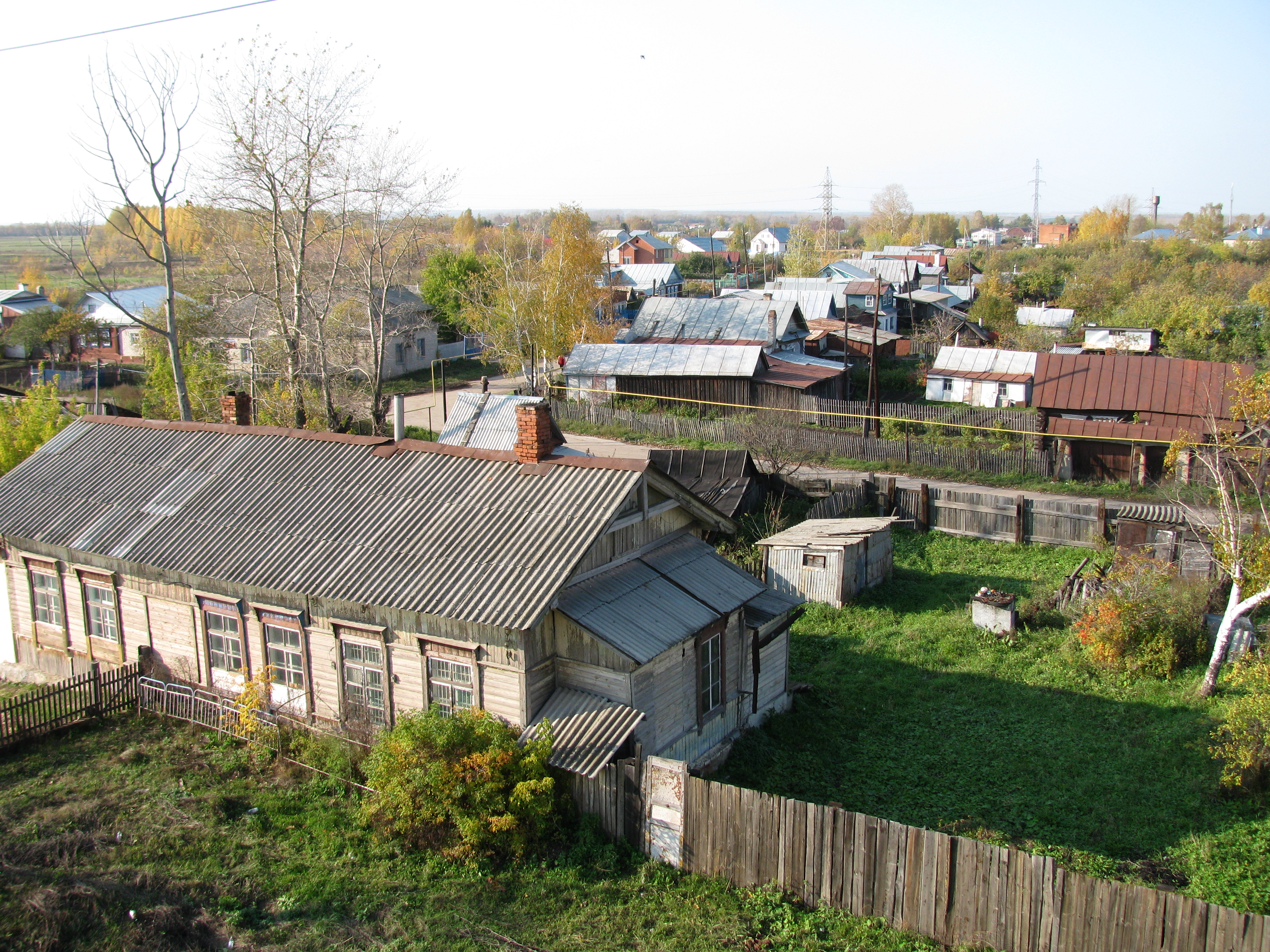
- Village Tyurlema, Kozlovsky District

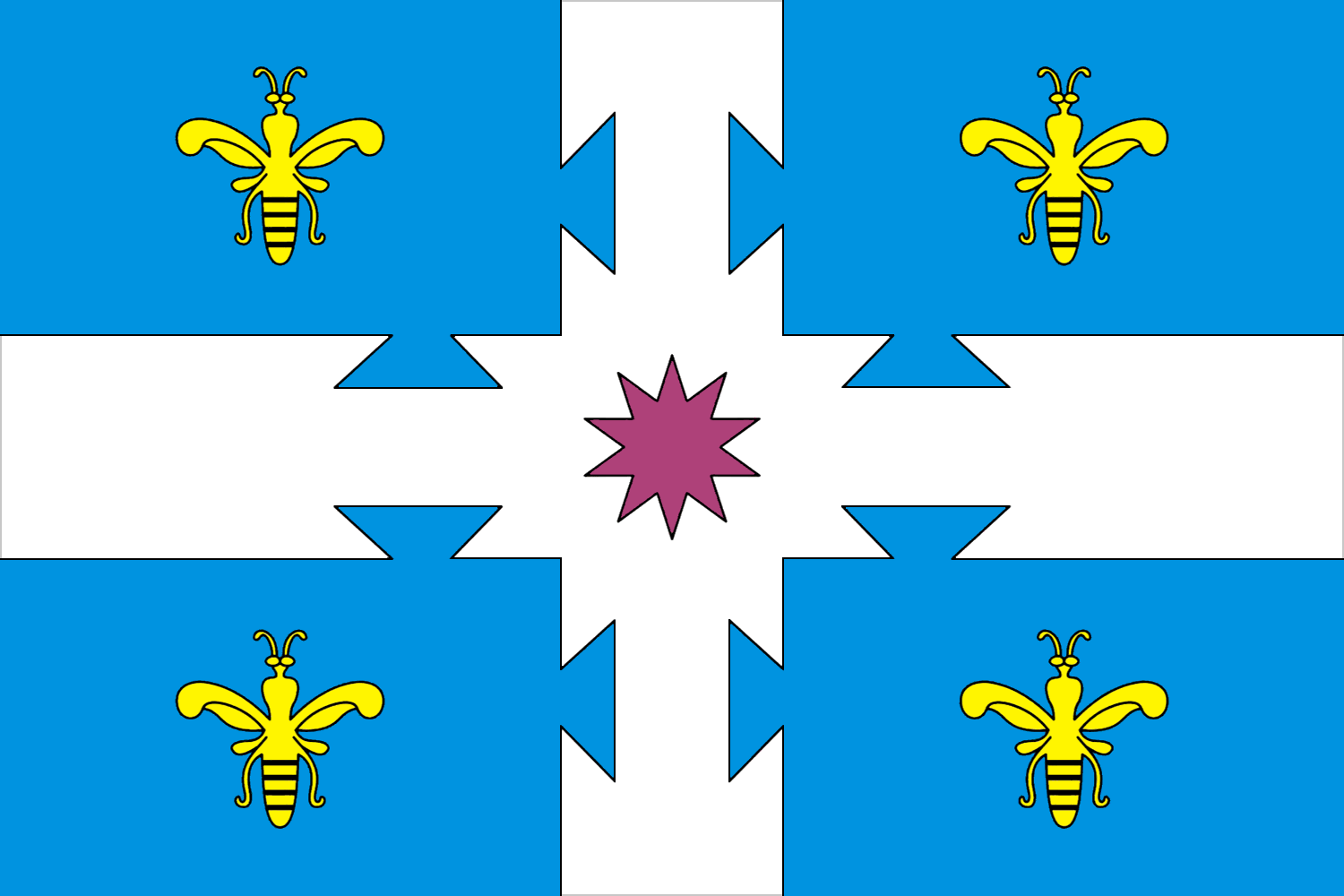
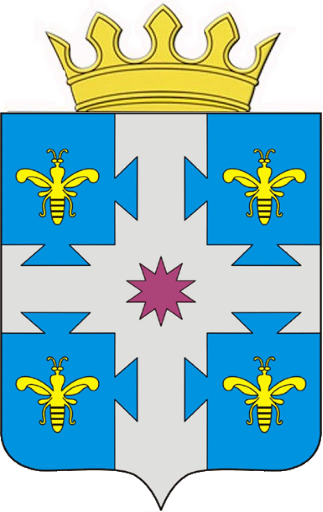
- Flag Coat of arms
- Location of Kozlovsky District in the Chuvash Republic
- Coordinates: 55.815°N 47.818°E
- Country: Russia
- Federal subject: Chuvash Republic
- Established: 1927
- Administrative center: Kozlovka

Area
  - Total: 516.8 km^{2} (199.5 sq mi)

Population (2010 Census)
  - Total: 21,649
  - Density: 41.89/km^{2} (108.5/sq mi)
  - Urban: 47.8%
  - Rural: 52.2%

Administrative structure
  - Administrative divisions: 1 Urban settlements, 9 Rural settlements
  - Inhabited localities: 1 cities/towns, 67 rural localities

Municipal structure
  - Municipally incorporated as: Kozlovsky Municipal District
  - Municipal divisions: 1 urban settlements, 9 rural settlements
- Time zone: UTC+3 (MSK)
- OKTMO ID: 97619000
- Website: http://gov.cap.ru/main.asp?govid=65

Kozlovsky District (Russian: Козло́вский райо́н; Chuvash: Куславкка районӗ, Kuslavkka rayonĕ) is an administrative and municipal district (raion), one of the twenty-one in the Chuvash Republic, Russia. It is located in the northeast of the republic and borders with the Republic of Tatarstan in the east and southeast, Urmarsky District in the west and southwest, Tsivilsky District in the west, and with Mariinsky District in the northwest. The area of the district is 516.8 square kilometers (199.5 sq mi). Its administrative center is the town of Kozlovka Population: 21,649 (2010 census); 26,388 (2002 census); 27,141 (1989 Soviet census). The population of Kozlovka accounts for 47.8% of the district's total population.
