= Mariinsko-Posadsky =

Mariinsko-Posadsky (masculine), Mariinsko-Posadskaya (feminine), or Mariinsko-Posadskoye (neuter) may refer to:

- Mariinsko-Posadsky District, a district of the Chuvash Republic, Russia
- Mariinsko-Posadskoye Urban Settlement, an administrative division and a municipal formation which the town of Mariinsky Posad in Mariinsko-Posadsky District of the Chuvash Republic, Russia is incorporated as
