= Mariinskyi =

Mariinskyi may refer to:

- Mariinskyi Palace, a neo-classical palace in Kyiv, Ukraine; ceremonial residence of the President of Ukraine
- Mariinskyi Park, a park located in Pechersk neighborhood, Kyiv

== See also ==
- Mariinsky (disambiguation)
