= Urmary =

Urban locality in Chuvashia, Russia

Urmary Урмары
- Urban-type settlement

Other transcription(s)
  - Chuvash: Вăрмар
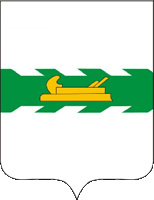
- Flag Coat of arms
- Interactive map of Urmary
- Location of Urmary Urmary (Chuvash Republic)
- Coordinates: 55°41′02″N 47°56′40″E
- Country: Russia
- Federal subject: Chuvashia
- Founded: 1893

Population (2010 Census)
  - Total: 5,679
  - Estimate (2021): 5,290 (−6.8%)

Administrative status
  - Subordinated to: Urban-type settlement of Urmary
  - Capital of: Urmarsky District
- Time zone: UTC+3 (MSK)
- Postal code: 429400
- Dialing code: +7 +7 83544
- OKTMO ID: 97638151051
- Website: ht

Urmary (Russian: Урмары, Chuvash: Вăрмар, Vărmar) is an urban-type settlement and the administrative center of Urmarsky District, the Chuvash Republic, Russia. Population: 5,679 (2010 census); 6,316 (2002 census); 6,016 (1989 Soviet census).
