= Surhuri =

Chuvash holiday at Christmastime

Surhuri (Chuvash: Сурхури) is a Chuvash holiday, dedicated to celebrating the new year. The name may also be designated to Christmas celebrations in areas where traditional paganism was replaced by Christianity. The word Surhuri (Upper Chuvash people pronounce it as "Sorhori") means "a sheep leg". Similarly, pagans of the Mari people celebrate and call this holiday Shorok yol ("a sheep leg").

Surhuri is celebrated in winter and approximately coincides with Russian Christmas (January 7). Ulhash Chuvash pagans celebrate Surhuri on January 6. According to V.K. Magnitskiy, Chuvash people used to celebrate it at the end of December, on the third Friday after Saint Nicholas Day (December 6). South Chuvash people still differentiate between Russian Christmas and Surhuri. Like North Chuvash, Cheremis people celebrate it on Friday before or after Russian Christmas.

Surhuri is celebrated according to the ancient customs with sacrifices and prayers corresponding to them, and the holiday consists of continuous festivities, pranks and jokes. According to V.K. Magnitskiy's description, boys and girls used to enter houses and gather groats and bins, saying the words:

Me-e-e, let sheep have lambs,
Let girls remain virgins,
Let women give birth to babies.

== Literature ==
- Skvortsov M. I., "Культура чувашского края" (The culture of Chuvash people), Cheboksary, 1995, ISBN 5-7670-0697-0.
