= Kalmykovo =

Kalmykovo Калмыково
- Village
- Location within Bashkortostan Location within Russia
- Coordinates: 55°45′N 55°18′E
- Country: Russia
- Region: Bashkortostan
- District: Burayevsky District
- Time zone: UTC+5:00

Kalmykovo (Russian: Калмыково; Bashkir: Ҡалмыҡ, Qalmıq) is a rural locality (a village) in Badrakovsky Selsoviet, Burayevsky District, Bashkortostan, Russia. The population was 56 as of 2010. There are 2 streets.

== Geography ==
Kalmykovo is located 13 km southwest of Burayevo (the district's administrative centre) by road. Starobikmetovo is the nearest rural locality.
