= Kozlovka, Kozlovsky District, Chuvash Republic =

Town in the Chuvash Republic, Russia

Kozlovka Козловка
- Town

Other transcription(s)
  - Chuvash: Куславкка
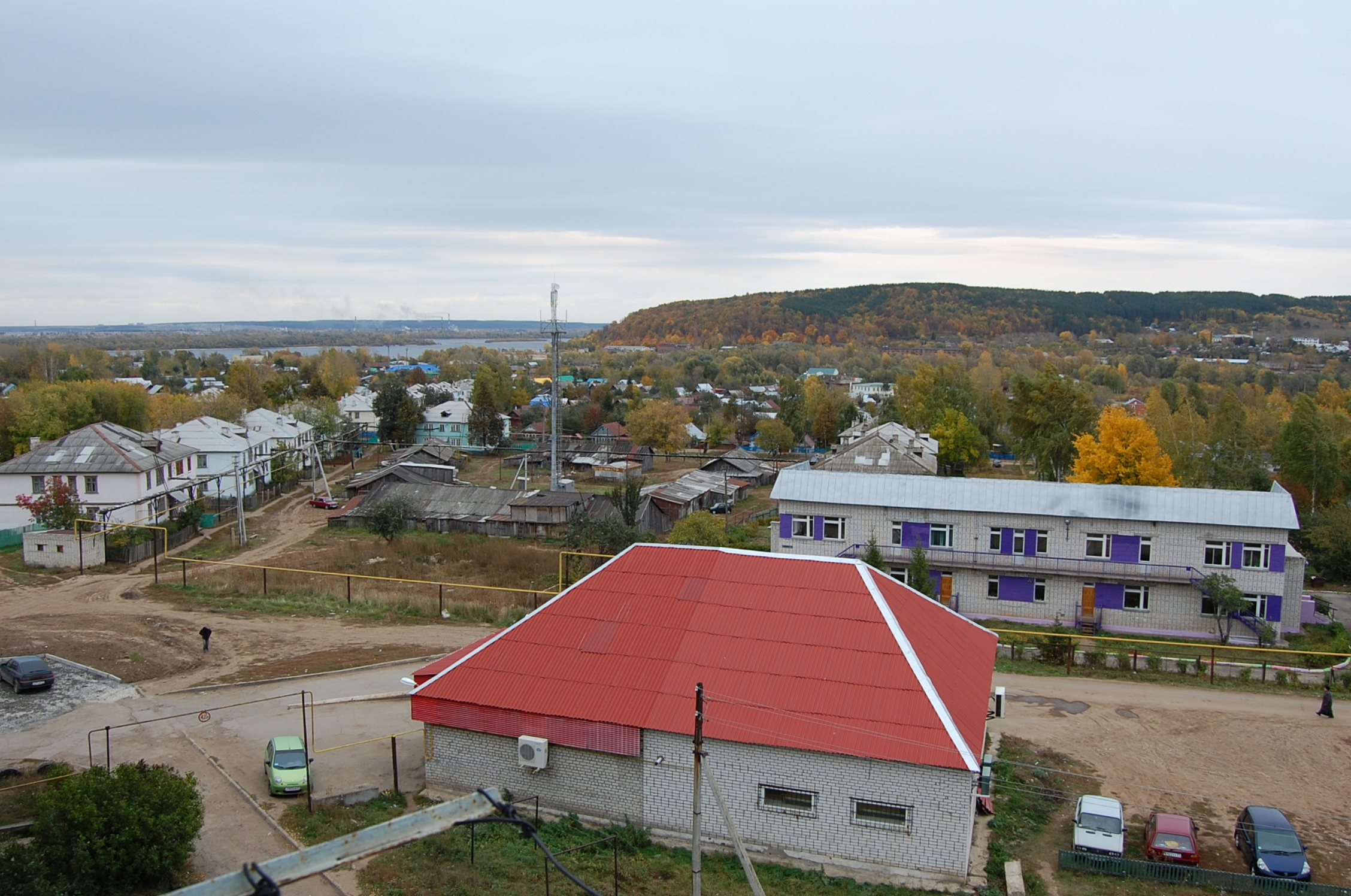
- Kozlovka

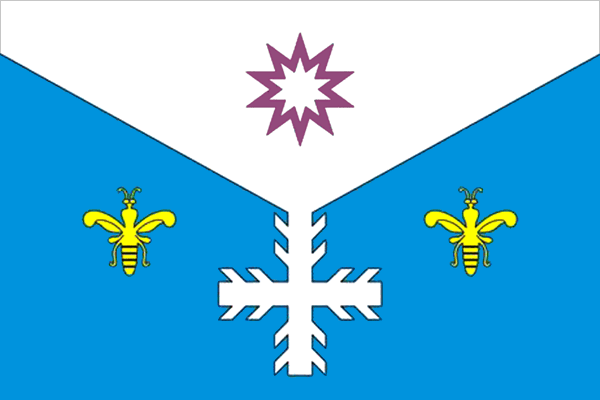
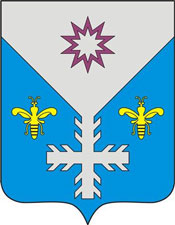
- Flag Coat of arms
- Interactive map of Kozlovka
- Location of Kozlovka Kozlovka (Chuvash Republic)
- Coordinates: 55°51′N 48°15′E
- Country: Russia
- Federal subject: Chuvashia
- Administrative district: Kozlovsky District
- Urban settlementSelsoviet: Kozlovskoye
- Founded: 1671
- Town status since: November 20, 1967
- Elevation: 70 m (230 ft)

Population (2010 Census)
  - Total: 10,359
  - Estimate (2021): 7,781 (−24.9%)

Administrative status
  - Capital of: Kozlovsky District, Kozlovskoye Urban Settlement

Municipal status
  - Municipal district: Kozlovsky Municipal District
  - Urban settlement: Kozlovskoye Urban Settlement
  - Capital of: Kozlovsky Municipal District, Kozlovskoye Urban Settlement
- Time zone: UTC+3 (MSK)
- Postal code: 429430
- OKTMO ID: 97619101001
- Website: gov.cap.ru/Default.aspx?gov_id=372

Kozlovka (Russian: Козло́вка; Chuvash: Куславкка, Kuslavkka) is a town and the administrative center of Kozlovsky District of the Chuvash Republic, Russia, located on the right bank of the Volga River, near the borders with the Mari El Republic and the Republic of Tatarstan. Population: 10,359 (2010 census); 13,054 (2002 census); 12,708 (1989 Soviet census).

== History ==
The first settlement on the place of modern town was founded in 1671. Kozlovka was granted urban-type settlement status in 1938 and town status on November 20, 1967.

== Administrative and municipal status ==
Within the framework of administrative divisions, Kozlovka serves as the administrative center of Kozlovsky District. As an administrative division, it is, together with three rural localities, incorporated within Kozlovsky District as Kozlovskoye Urban Settlement. As a municipal division, this administrative unit also has urban settlement status and is a part of Kozlovsky Municipal District.
