= Mariinsky, Republic of Bashkortostan =

Mariinsky Мариинский
- Selo
- Location within Bashkortostan Location within Russia
- Coordinates: 53°38′N 55°51′E
- Country: Russia
- Region: Bashkortostan
- District: Sterlitamaksky District
- Time zone: UTC+5:00

Mariinsky (Russian: Мариинский) is a rural locality (a selo) in Otradovsky Selsoviet, Sterlitamaksky District, Bashkortostan, Russia. The population was 1,896 as of 2010. There are 23 streets.

== Geography ==
Mariinsky is located 6 km west of Sterlitamak (the district's administrative centre) by road. Sterlitamak is the nearest rural locality.
