= Yadrinsky Uyezd =

Yadrinsky Uyezd (Russian: Я́дринский уе́зд; Chuvash: Етĕрне уесĕ) was one of the subdivisions of the Kazan Governorate of the Russian Empire. It was situated in the western part of the governorate. Its administrative centre was Yadrin.

== Demographics ==
At the time of the Russian Empire Census of 1897, Yadrinsky Uyezd had a population of 154,493. Of these, 90.9% spoke Chuvash and 9.0% Russian as their native language.
