= Tsivilsky District =

Tsivilsky District Цивильский район (Russian)
- District

Other transcription(s)
  - Chuvash: Çĕрпӳ районӗ
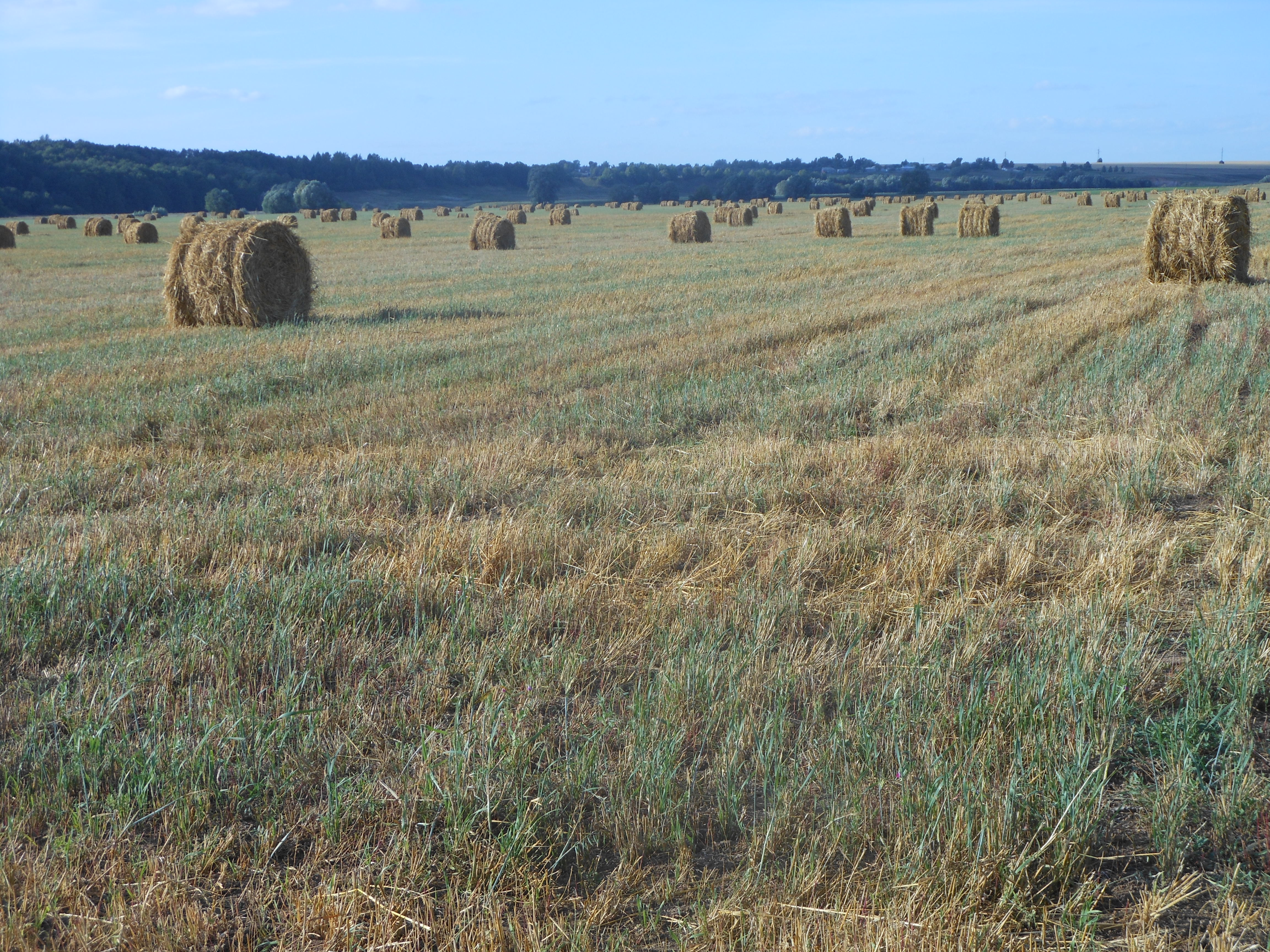
- August harvest in Tsivil River valley, Tsivilsky District

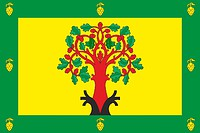
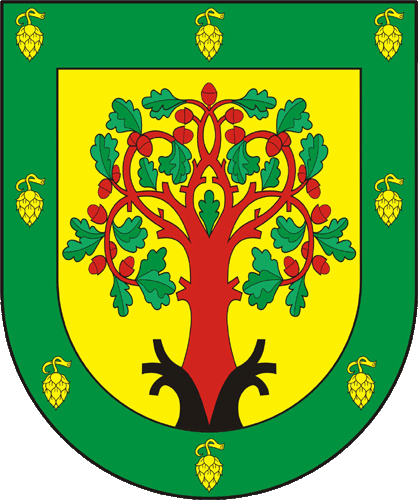
- Flag Coat of arms
- Location of Tsivilsky District in the Chuvash Republic
- Coordinates: 55.821°N 47.208°E
- Country: Russia
- Federal subject: Chuvash Republic
- Established: September 5, 1927
- Administrative center: Tsivilsk

Area
  - Total: 790.8 km^{2} (305.3 sq mi)

Population (2010 Census)
  - Total: 36,772
  - Density: 46.50/km^{2} (120.4/sq mi)
  - Urban: 36.7%
  - Rural: 63.3%

Administrative structure
  - Administrative divisions: 1 Urban settlements, 16 Rural settlements
  - Inhabited localities: 1 cities/towns, 138 rural localities

Municipal structure
  - Municipally incorporated as: Tsivilsky Municipal District
  - Municipal divisions: 1 urban settlements, 16 rural settlements
- Time zone: UTC+3 (MSK)
- OKTMO ID: 97641000
- Website: http://gov.cap.ru/main.asp?govid=74

Tsivilsky District (Note: Russian: Цивильский район, romanized: Civiljskij raion, IPA: [tsʲɪˈvʲilʲsʲkʲɪj rɐˈjɵn]; Chuvash: Çĕрпӳ районӗ, romanized: Cĕrpű rayonĕ) is an administrative and municipal district (raion), one of the twenty-one in the Chuvash Republic, Russia. It is located in the northeast of the republic and borders with Cheboksarsky District in the north and northwest, Mariinsko-Posadsky District in the northeast, Kanashsky District in the south, and with Krasnoarmeysky District in the west. The area of the district is 790.8 square kilometers (305.3 sq mi). Its administrative center is the town of Tsivilsk. Population: 36,772 (2010 census); 38,744 (2002 census); 37,581 (1989 Soviet census). The population of Tsivilsk accounts for 36.7% of the district's total population.

== History ==
The district was established on September 5, 1927.

== Notable residents ==
- Olimpiada Ivanova (born 1970), race walker
- Olga Vasilyeva (born 1974), football player for Azerbaijan
