= Tsivilsk =

Town in the Chuvash Republic, Russia

Tsivilsk Цивильск
- Town

Other transcription(s)
  - Chuvash: Ҫӗрпӳ
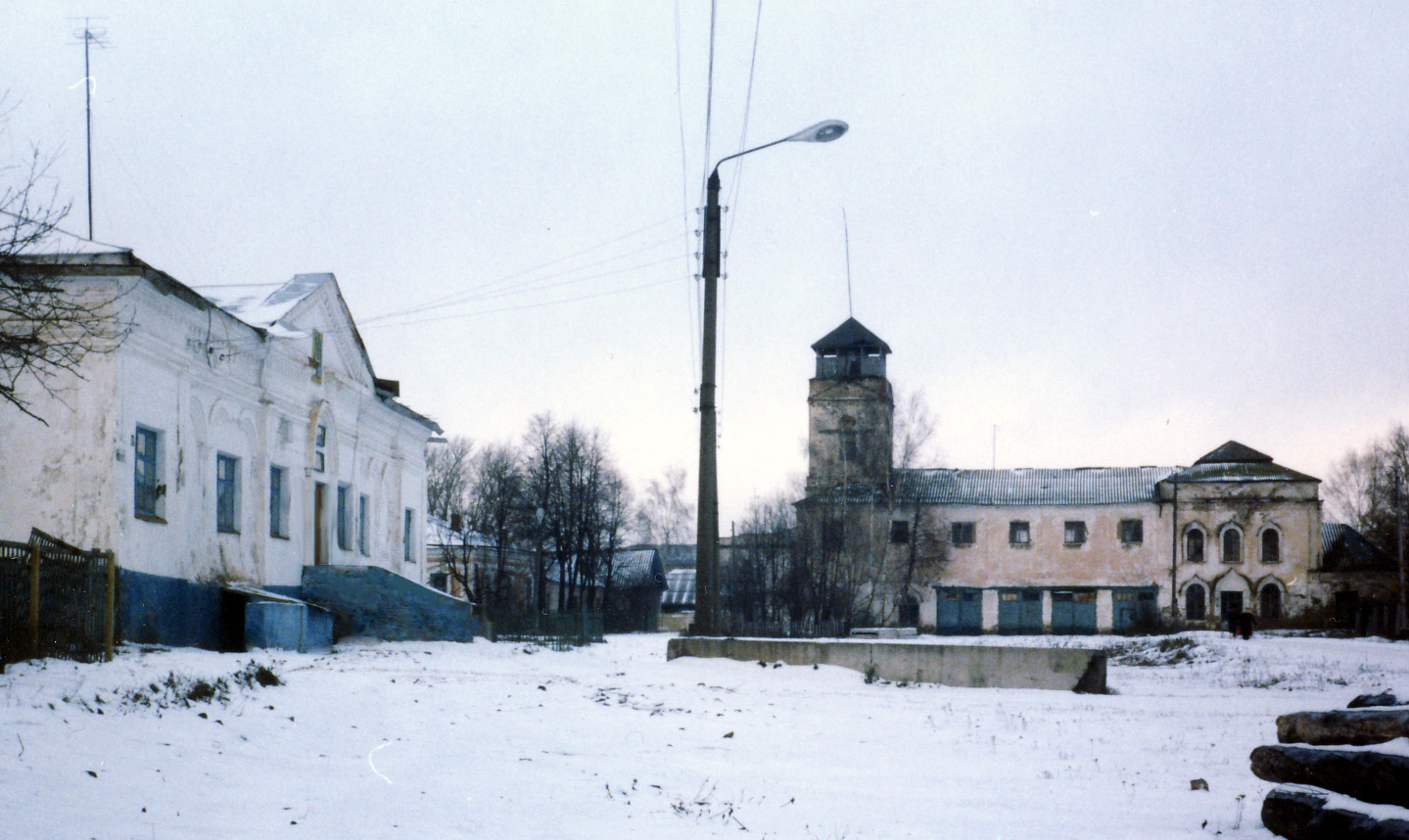
- Central part of Tsivilsk

- Flag Coat of arms
- Interactive map of Tsivilsk
- Location of Tsivilsk Tsivilsk (Chuvash Republic)
- Coordinates: 55°52′N 47°29′E
- Country: Russia
- Federal subject: Chuvashia
- Administrative district: Tsivilsky District
- Urban settlementSelsoviet: Tsivilskoye
- Founded: 1589
- Town status since: 1781

Government
  - Body: Assembly of Deputies
- Elevation: 70 m (230 ft)

Population (2010 Census)
  - Total: 13,479
  - Estimate (2021): 12,762 (−5.3%)

Administrative status
  - Capital of: Tsivilsky District, Tsivilskoye Urban Settlement

Municipal status
  - Municipal district: Tsivilsky Municipal District
  - Urban settlement: Tsivilskoye Urban Settlement
  - Capital of: Tsivilsky Municipal District, Tsivilskoye Urban Settlement
- Time zone: UTC+3 (MSK)
- Postal codes: 429900, 429901
- Dialing code: +7 83545
- OKTMO ID: 97641101001
- Website: gov.cap.ru/Default.aspx?gov_id=477

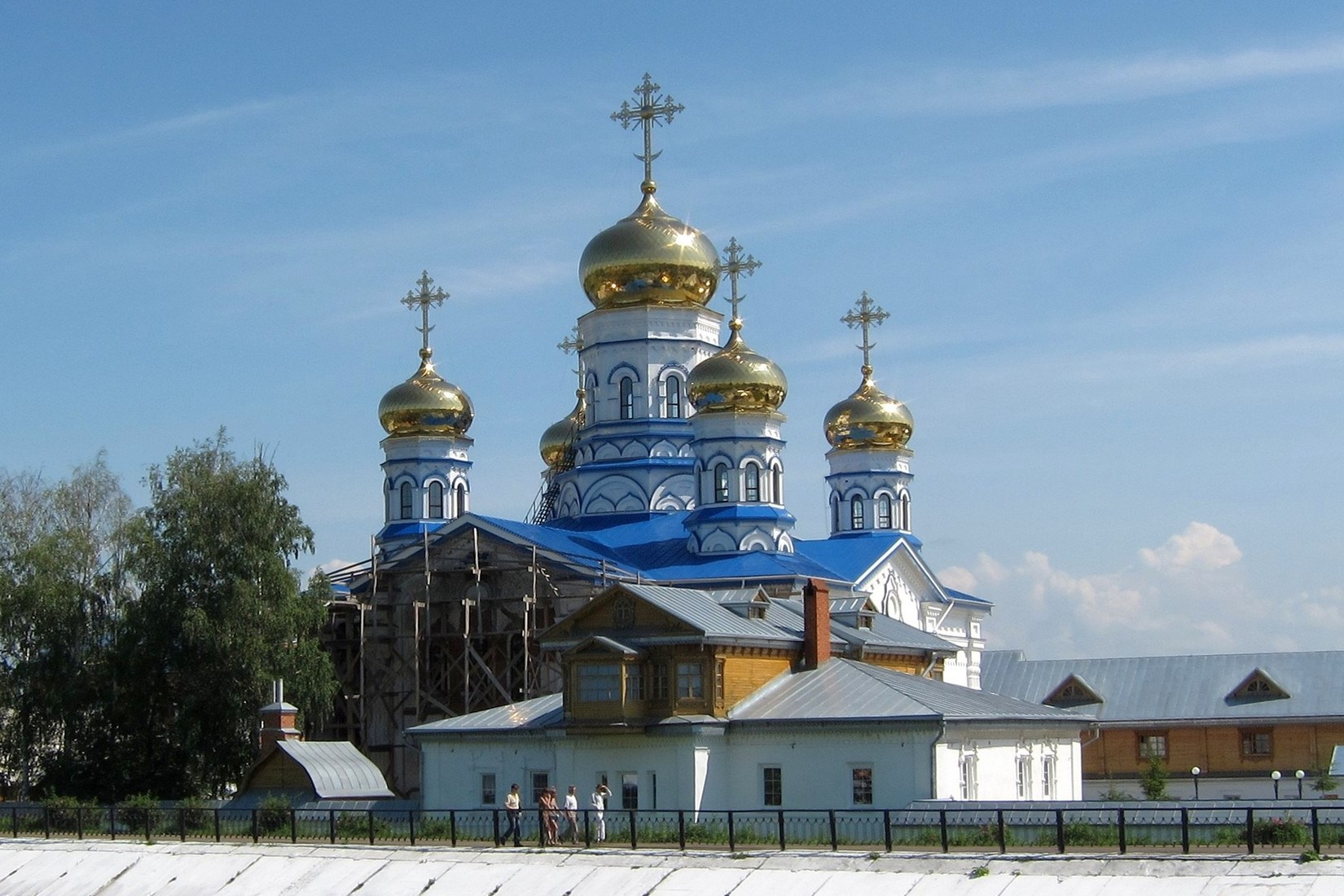
Tsivilsk The Virgin of Tikhvin Monastery Cathedral of Our Lady of Tikhvin, 2011

Tsivilsk, also rendered Tzivilsk or Civilsk, (Note: /sɪˈvɪlsk/; Russian: Цивильск, romanized: Civiljsk, IPA: [tsʲɪˈvʲilʲsk]; Chuvash: Çӗрпӳ, romanized: Cĕrpű, IPA: [ɕɵ̆rˈpʏ]) is a town and the administrative center of Tsivilsky District of the Chuvash Republic, Russia, located 37 kilometers (23 mi) from the republic's capital city of Cheboksary, at the crossroads of the highways from Nizhny Novgorod to Kazan and from Tsivilsk to Ulyanovsk.

== History ==
The original fortress at Tsivilsk was founded in 1589 as a Russian military outpost among the Chuvash population.

== Administrative and municipal status ==
Within the framework of administrative divisions, Tsivilsk serves as the administrative center of Tsivilsky District. As an administrative division, it is incorporated within Tsivilsky District as Tsivilskoye Urban Settlement. As a municipal division, this administrative unit also has urban settlement status and is a part of Tsivilsky Municipal District.

== Demographics ==
Population: 13,479 (2010 census); 12,967 (2002 census); 10,053 (1989 Soviet census).

== Infrastructure ==
There is a 350-meter (1,150 ft) tall guyed mast used for FM- and TV-broadcasting in the town.
