= Mariinsky Posad =

Town in the Chuvash Republic, Russia

Mariinsky Posad Мариинский Посад
- Town

Other transcription(s)
  - Chuvash: Сĕнтĕрвăрри
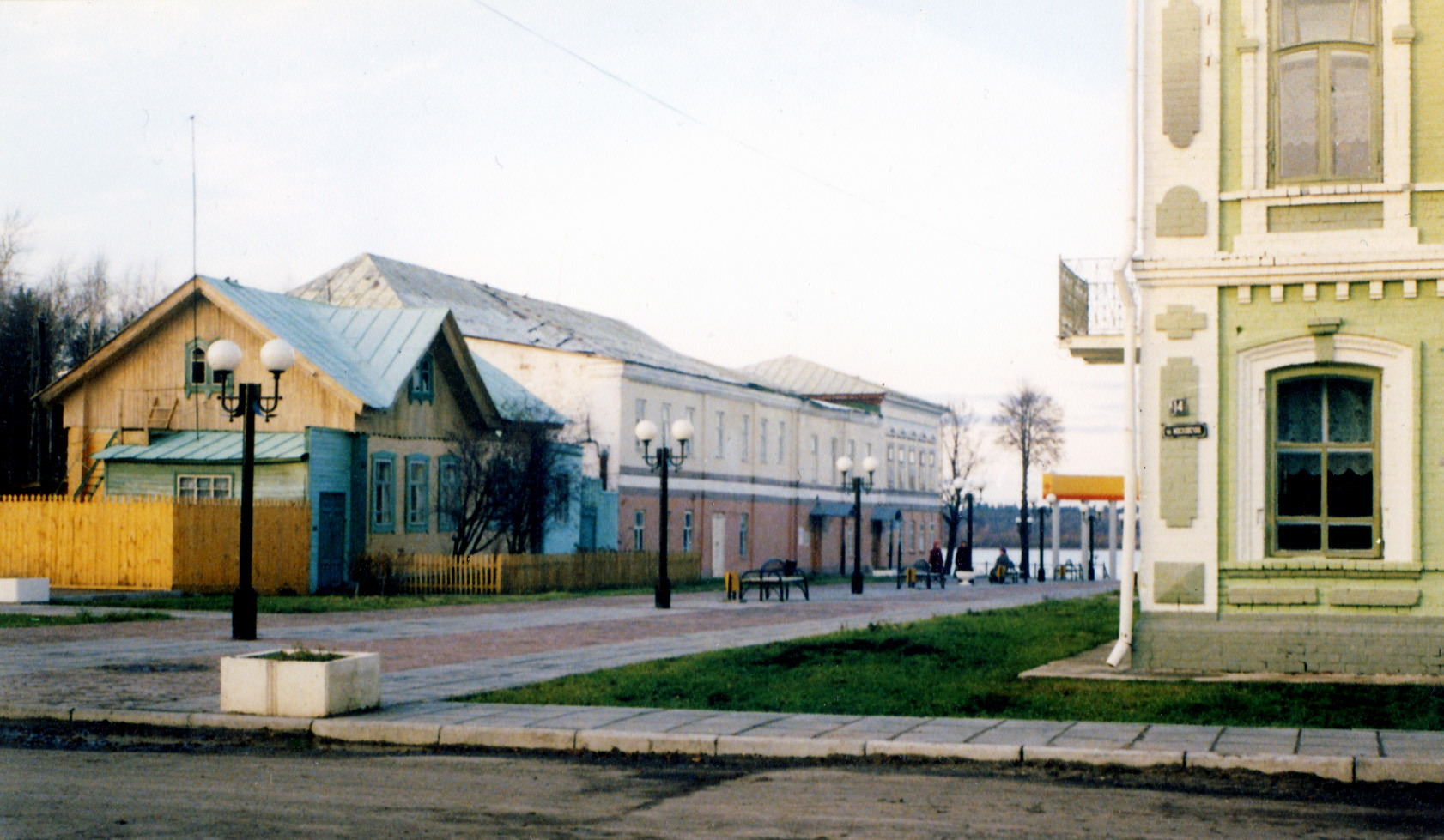
- In Mariinsky Posad

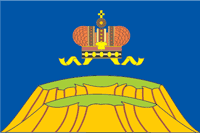
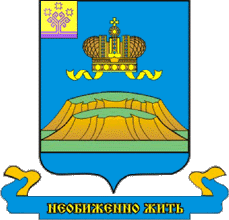
- Flag Coat of arms
- Interactive map of Mariinsky Posad
- Location of Mariinsky Posad Mariinsky Posad (Chuvash Republic)
- Coordinates: 56°06′N 47°43′E
- Country: Russia
- Federal subject: Chuvashia
- Administrative district: Mariinsko-Posadsky District
- Urban settlementSelsoviet: Mariinsko-Posadskoye
- First mentioned: 1620
- Town status since: 1856
- Elevation: 80 m (260 ft)

Population (2010 Census)
  - Total: 9,088
  - Estimate (2021): 7,851 (−13.6%)

Administrative status
  - Capital of: Mariinsko-Posadsky District, Mariinsko-Posadskoye Urban Settlement

Municipal status
  - Municipal district: Mariinsko-Posadsky Municipal District
  - Urban settlement: Mariinsko-Posadskoye Urban Settlement
  - Capital of: Mariinsko-Posadsky Municipal District, Mariinsko-Posadskoye Urban Settlement
- Time zone: UTC+3 (MSK)
- Postal codes: 429570, 429572, 429573
- OKTMO ID: 97629101001
- Website: gov.cap.ru/Default.aspx?gov_id=412

Mariinsky Posad population
- 2010 Census: 9,088
- 2002 Census: 10,273
- 1989 Census: 10,443
- 1979 Census: 10,025

Mariinsky Posad (Russian: Марии́нский Поса́д; Chuvash: Сĕнтĕрвăрри, Sĕntĕrvărri) is a town and the administrative center of Mariinsko-Posadsky District in the Chuvash Republic, Russia, located on the right bank of the Volga River, 36 kilometers (22 mi) east of Cheboksary, the capital of the republic. As of the 2010 Census, its population was 9,088.

== History ==
It was first mentioned in 1620 as the selo of Sundyr (Сундырь), named after the Sundyrka River (a tributary of the Volga). It was granted town status and renamed Mariinsky Posad after Empress consort Maria Alexandrovna in 1856.

== Administrative and municipal status ==
Within the framework of administrative divisions, Mariinsky Posad serves as the administrative center of Mariinsko-Posadsky District. As an administrative division, it is incorporated within Mariinsko-Posadsky District as Mariinsko-Posadskoye Urban Settlement. As a municipal division, this administrative unit also has urban settlement status and is a part of Mariinsko-Posadsky Municipal District.

== Economy ==
There are eleven processing, mechanical engineering, and construction materials factories in the town. Some of the other industries of employment in the city are a plant of cable works, a large automobile-repairing industry, a distillery, and a cooking oil-producing plant.

== Nature ==
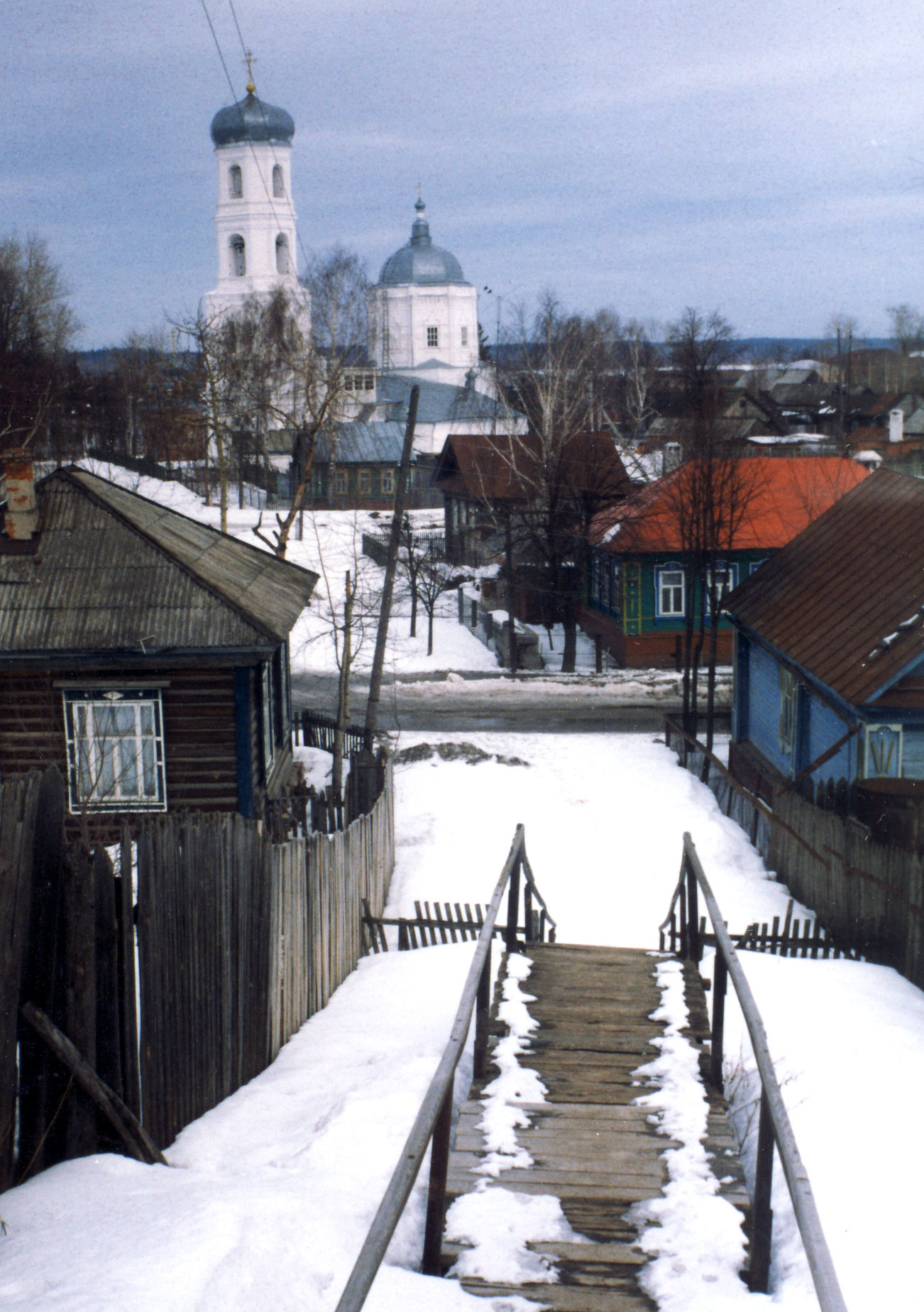
Beginning of spring in Mariinsky Posad

The area around the town has rich wildlife. There are several national parks and reservations nearby. The area is a popular ecotourism destination.

== Education ==
The town has several schools.
