= List of rural localities in Omsk Oblast =

Map of Russia with Omsk Oblast highlighted

This is a list of rural localities in Omsk Oblast. Omsk Oblast (Russian: О́мская о́бласть, Omskaya oblast) is a federal subject of Russia (an oblast), located in southwestern Siberia. The oblast has an area of 139,700 square kilometers (53,900 sq mi). Its population is 1,977,665 (2010 Census) with the majority, 1.15 million, living in Omsk, the administrative center.

== Locations ==
- 1st Fominovka - village
- 2nd Fominovka - village
- 18 Partsezd - village
- 2595 km - railway station
- 2672 km - railway station
- 2783 km - railway station
- 2786 km - railway station
- Azovo - selo, administrative center of Azovsky Nemetsky National District
- Baykal - village
- Bolshiye Uki - selo
- Golbshtadt - village
- Kolosovka - selo, administrative center of Kolosovsky District
- Moskalenki - administrative center of Moskalensky District
- Nizhnyaya Omka - selo
- Odesskoye - selo, administrative center of Odessky District
- Okunevo - village
- Rostovka - settlement, administrative center of Omsky District
- Ryzhkovo - village
- Sedelnikovo - selo, administrative center of Sedelnikovsky District
- Ust-Ishim - selo, administrative center of Ust-Ishimsky District
- XVI Partsezd - village
- Znamenskoye - selo, administrative center of Znamensky District

== See also ==
- Lists of rural localities in Russia
