= Flag of Omsk Oblast =

The flag of Omsk Oblast, approved on 17 June 2003. Authors: I.A. Vahitov, A.M. Karimov, A. Nikitin

The flag of Omsk Oblast is an official symbol of Omsk Oblast in Russia.

== Description ==
The flag of Omsk Oblast is a triband of three equal vertical stripes of red, white, and red. In the centre of the white band, there is a blue vertical wavy azure pole which is 1/3 of its width.

The ratio of the flag's width to its length is 2:3.

=== The interpretation of symbols ===
The main background of the flag of Omsk Oblast is red. It symbolizes bravery, courage, fearlessness. It is the colour of life, charity, and love.

The white symbolizes nobility, purity, justice, generosity, and indicates the climatic features of Siberia.

The wavy azure (blue) post symbolizes the Irtysh River, the main waterway of the oblast. Allegorically, the blue reflects beauty, majesty, and gentleness.

== Other flags ==
=== Administrative Divisions ===
Flag	Date	Use	description
	2016–Present	Flag of Omsk city	
	2002–2016	Flag of Omsk city	
	?–Present	Flag of Isilkul	
	?–Present	Flag of Nazyvayevsk	
	?–Present	Flag of Tara	
	?–Present	Flag of Tyukalinsk	
	2020–Present	Flag of Azovsky Nemetsky National District	
	2007–2020	Flag of Azovsky Nemetsky National District	
	2020–Present	Flag of Bolsherechensky District	
	2012–2020	Flag of Bolsherechensky District	
	?–Present	Flag of Bolsheukovsky District	
	?–Present	Flag of Gorkovsky District	
	?–Present	Flag of Znamensky District	
	?–Present	Flag of Isilkulsky District	
	?–Present	Flag of Kalachinsky District	
	?–Present	Flag of Kolosovsky District	
	?–Present	Flag of Kormilovsky District	
	?–Present	Flag of Krutinsky District	
	2017–Present	Flag of Lyubinsky District	
	2007–2017	Flag of Lyubinsky District	
	2020–Present	Flag of Maryanovsky District	
	2006–2020	Flag of Maryanovsky District	
	2020–Present	Flag of Moskalensky District	
	2009–2020	Flag of Moskalensky District	
	?–Present	Flag of Muromtsevsky District	
	2015–Present	Flag of Nazyvayevsky District	
	2008–2015	Flag of Nazyvayevsky District	
		Flag of Nizhneomsky District	
	2007–Present	Flag of Novovarshavsky District	
	2006–2007	Flag of Novovarshavsky District	
	?–Present	Flag of Odessky District	
	2020–Present	Flag of Okoneshnikovsky District	
	2004–2020	Flag of Okoneshnikovsky District	
	2020–Present	Flag of Omsky District	
	2006–2020	Flag of Omsky District	
	?–Present	Flag of Pavlogradsky District	
	?–Present	Flag of Poltavsky District	
	?–Present	Flag of Russko-Polyansky District	
	2020–Present	Flag of Sargatsky District	
	2010–2020	Flag of Sargatsky District	
	?–Present	Flag of Sedelnikovsky District	
	2020–Present	Flag of Tavrichesky District	
	2013–2020	Flag of Tavrichesky District	
	?–Present	Flag of Tarsky District	
	2022–Present	Flag of Tevrizsky District	
	2011–2022	Flag of Tevrizsky District	
	?–Present	Flag of Tyukalinsky District	
	2013–Present	Flag of Ust-Ishimsky District	
	2013–2020	Flag of Ust-Ishimsky District	
	2010–2013	Flag of Ust-Ishimsky District	
	2020–Present	Flag of Cherlaksky District	
	2011–2020	Flag of Cherlaksky District	
	?–Present	Flag of Sherbakulsky District	
	2006–2020	Flag of Sherbakulsky District	

=== Others ===
Flag	Date	Use	description
	?–Present	Flag of Azovo	
	?–Present	Flag of Lyubinsky	
