= Baykal, Russia =

Baykal (Russian: Байкал) is the name of several rural localities in Russia:

- Baykal, Aurgazinsky District, Republic of Bashkortostan, a village in Balyklykulsky Selsoviet of Aurgazinsky District in the Republic of Bashkortostan
- Baykal, Nurimanovsky District, Republic of Bashkortostan, a village in Nikolsky Selsoviet of Nurimanovsky District in the Republic of Bashkortostan
- Baykal, Krasnoyarsk Krai, a settlement in Verkhnepashinsky Selsoviet of Yeniseysky District in Krasnoyarsk Krai
- Baykal, Novosibirsk Oblast, a village in Bolotninsky District of Novosibirsk Oblast
- Baykal, Omsk Oblast, a village in Syropyatsky Rural Okrug of Kormilovsky District in Omsk Oblast
- Baykal, Primorsky Krai, a settlement in Pogranichny District of Primorsky Krai
- Baykal, Arsky District, Republic of Tatarstan, a selo in Arsky District of the Republic of Tatarstan
- Baykal, Vysokogorsky District, Republic of Tatarstan, a village in Vysokogorsky District of the Republic of Tatarstan
- Baykal, Tyumen Oblast, a village in Novotroitsky Rural Okrug of Nizhnetavdinsky District in Tyumen Oblast

== See also ==
- Baykal (port), a rural locality (a settlement) in Slyudyansky District of Irkutsk Oblast
