= Kolosovka =

Kolosovka (Russian: Колосовка) is the name of several rural localities in Russia:

- Kolosovka, Kaliningrad Oblast, a settlement in Pereslavsky Rural Okrug of Zelenogradsky District of Kaliningrad Oblast
- Kolosovka, Kursk Oblast, a village in Starkovsky Selsoviet of Oktyabrsky District of Kursk Oblast
- Kolosovka, Izmalkovsky District, Lipetsk Oblast, a village in Lebyazhensky Selsoviet of Izmalkovsky District of Lipetsk Oblast
- Kolosovka, Yeletsky District, Lipetsk Oblast, a village in Kolosovsky Selsoviet of Yeletsky District of Lipetsk Oblast
- Kolosovka, Omsk Oblast, a selo in Kolosovsky Rural Okrug of Kolosovsky District of Omsk Oblast
- Kolosovka, Pskov Oblast, a village in Pechorsky District of Pskov Oblast
- Kolosovka, Smolensk Oblast, a village in Barsukovskoye Rural Settlement of Monastyrshchinsky District of Smolensk Oblast
- Kolosovka, Republic of Tatarstan, a village in Yelabuzhsky District of the Republic of Tatarstan
