= Nizhnyaya Omka =

Nizhnyaya Omka (Russian: Нижняя Омка) is the name of several rural localities (selos and villages) in Nizhneomsky District of Omsk Oblast, Russia:

- Nizhnyaya Omka, Nizhneomsky Rural Okrug, Nizhneomsky District, Omsk Oblast, a selo in Nizhneomsky Rural Okrug
- Nizhnyaya Omka, Solovetsky Rural Okrug, Nizhneomsky District, Omsk Oblast, a village in Solovetsky Rural Okrug
