= Moskalenki =

Moskalenki (Russian: Москаленки) is the name of several urban and rural inhabited localities (urban-type work settlements and villages) in Russia.

Urban localities

- Moskalenki, Omsk Oblast, a work settlement in Moskalensky District of Omsk Oblast

Rural localities

- Moskalenki, Smolensk Oblast, a village in Smoligovskoye Rural Settlement of Rudnyansky District of Smolensk Oblast
