= 2783 km =

2783 km 2783 км
- Railway station
- Location within Omsk Oblast Location within Russia
- Coordinates: 55.033611°N 74.471389°E
- Country: Russia
- Region: Omsk Oblast
- District: Kalachinsky District
- Time zone: UTC+6:00

2783 km (Russian: 2783 км) is a rural locality (a settlement serving a railway station) in Kulikovskoye Rural Settlement of Kalachinsky District, Omsk Oblast, Russia. The population was 20 as of 2010.

== Geography ==
The village is located 4 km west-south-west from Kalachinsk.

== Streets ==
- Ostanovochnaya
