= Moskalensky =

Moskalensky (masculine), Moskalenskaya (feminine), or Moskalenskoye (neuter) may refer to:

- Moskalensky District, a district of Omsk Oblast, Russia
- Moskalensky (rural locality), a rural locality (a settlement) in Omsk Oblast, Russia
