= 2786 km =

2786 km 2786 км
- Railway station
- Location within Omsk Oblast Location within Russia
- Coordinates: 55.038056°N 74.518889°E
- Country: Russia
- Region: Omsk Oblast
- District: Kalachinsky District
- Time zone: UTC+6:00

2786 km (Russian: 2786 км) is a rural locality (a railway station) in Kulikovskoye Rural Settlement of Kalachinsky District, Russia. The population was 14 as of 2010.

== Geography ==
The village is located 1 km west-south-west from Kalachinsk.

== Streets ==
- Orlovskaya
