= Kalachinsky =

Kalachinsky (masculine), Kalachinskaya (feminine), or Kalachinskoye (neuter) may refer to:

- Kalachinsky District, a district of Omsk Oblast, Russia
- Kalachinskaya, a rural locality (a village) in Omsk Oblast, Russia
