= 1st Fominovka =

1st Fominovka 1-я Фоминовка
- Village
- Location within Omsk Oblast Location within Russia
- Coordinates: 54.831111°N 74.260833°E
- Country: Russia
- Region: Omsk Oblast
- District: Kormilovsky District
- Time zone: UTC+06:00

1st Fominovka (Russian: 1-я Фоминовка) is a rural locality (a village) in Novoselskoye Rural Settlement of Kormilovsky District, Russia. The population was 160 as of 2010.

== History ==
The town was founded in 1907. In 1928, the village of 1st Fominovka consisted of 72 households, the main population being Russians. It was a part of Novoselskoye village council of Kormilovsky district of Omsk region of Siberian territory.

== Streets ==
- Gagarina

== Geography ==
1st Fominovka is located 26 km south of Kormilovka (the district's administrative centre) by road. 2nd Fominovka is the nearest rural locality.
