= Pospelovo =

Pospelovo (Russian: Поспелово) is the name of several rural localities in Russia:

- Pospelovo, Omsk Oblast, a village in Ayevsky Rural Okrug of Bolsheukovsky District in Omsk Oblast; 56°53′N 72°47′E
- Pospelovo, Republic of Tatarstan, a selo in Yelabuzhsky District of the Republic of Tatarstan
