= Altunin =

Altunin (Russian: Алту́нин) or Altunina (feminine, Алту́нина) is a Russian surname. Notable people with the surname include:

- Alexander Altunin (1921–1989), Soviet general and politician

== Origins ==
There are many different interpretations of the names origin. Some researchers think is means the Turkic word "alta" which means gold which might mean being a noble. While another suggest that it comes from the ancient Russian word "Altyn", and is also associated with wealth.
