= Golbshtadt =

Golbshtadt Гольбштадт
- Interactive map of Golbshtadt
- Location of Golbshtadt Golbshtadt (Omsk Oblast)
- Coordinates: 54°55′N 71°54′E
- Country: Russia
- Federal subject: Omsk Oblast
- Founded: 1907

Population (2010 Census)
  - Total: 246
  - Estimate (2010): 246 (0%)

Administrative status
  - Subordinated to: town of oblast significance of Moskalenki, rural settlement of Yekaterinovka
- Time zone: UTC+6 (MSK+3)
- Postal code: 646070
- OKTMO ID: 52632404106

Golbshtadt (Russian: Гольбштадт, German: Halbstadt) is a village in Moskalensky District, Omsk Oblast. Golbshtadt belongs to the rural settlement of Yekaterinovka.

== Geography ==
The village is located 7 km south-west of Moskalenki. It is made out of one street which is called Tsentralnaya Ulitsa (Central Street).

== History ==
Golbshtadt was founded in 1907 by settlers from the Black Sea and Volga Germans of the Belovezhskaya colony.

== Population ==
1920	1926	1970	1979	1989	2010
251	↘199	↗295	↘261	↗268	↘246
