= Rysty Zhumabekova =

Kazakh politician (1952–2025)

- Рысты Жұмабекова
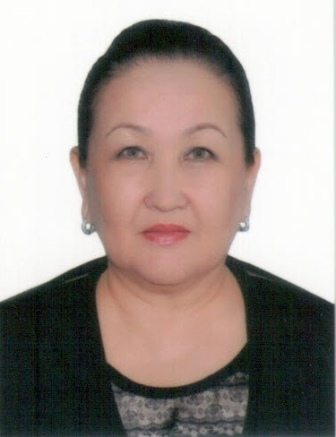
- Zhumabekova in 2020

Member of the Mäjilis
- In office 1996–1999

Personal details
- Born: Rysty Magauiyaqyzy Zhumabekova; 2 January 1952 Kalachinsky District, Kazakh SSR, USSR
- Died: 16 November 2025 (aged 73) Astana, Kazakhstan
- Education: Pavlodar Pedagogical Institute; Abai Kazakh National Pedagogical University
- Occupation: Politician, Lawyer

Rysty Magauiyaqyzy Zhumabekova (Kazakh: Рысты Мағауияқызы Жұмабекова; 2 January 1952 – 16 November 2025) was a Kazakh politician. She served in the Mäjilis from 1996 to 1999.

Zhumabekova died in Astana on 16 November 2025, at the age of 73.
