= Coat of arms of Omsk Oblast =

Coat of arms of the Omsk Oblast
- Armiger: Omsk Oblast
- Adopted: 2020
- Shield: On a red field there is a silver cross defaced with a wavy blue pallet, and over both in the middle is a contour of a five-bastioned fortress in red, with one bastion pointing up.
- Order(s): Order of Lenin

The coat of arms of Omsk Oblast in Russia were adopted 29 April 2020 by Governor Alexander Burkov.

== Design ==
The official heraldic description reads as follows:

On a red field there is a silver cross defaced with a wavy blue pallet, and over both in the middle is a contour of a five-bastioned fortress in red, with one bastion pointing up. The shield is crowned with an ancient royal crown and surrounded by the ribbon of the Order of Lenin.

== History ==
The old version of the arms, adopted 29 May 2003, had a gold cross on white instead. The cross sits between a semy of triangles. Its authors were Igor Vahitov, Albert Karimov and Oleg Nikitin.

The symbolism was described as follows:

- The "honour figure" of the emblem of the Omsk region is a golden cross, symbolising the Christian virtues of faith, justice, and mercy. It also represents the region's central location in Russia, and the Trans-Siberian Railway. The gold colour represents power, stability, strength, and wealth.
- The wavy azure pale, defacing the vertical part of the cross, represents the river Irtysh. The colour azure symbolises beauty, majesty, and gentleness.
- The fortress outline in the centre represents Omsk's fortress and the Tara Gates. Red symbolises courage, military valour, life, charity and love.
- The 32 small green pyramids corresponding to the amount of districts in the region, and also represent the vegetation, oil and gas fields. Green represents abundance, hope, joy.
- The white field of the shield is a symbol of purity of thought, nobility, justice, generosity. Additionally, it reflects the snowy expanses that define the Siberian landscape.

In 2019, a working group was established to produce a more heraldic replacement to the old design, which did not comply with the regulations of the State Heraldic Register of the Russian Federation. According to local heraldist Yevgeny Gruzdov, the new design was based on "the existing coat of arms, we do not create a new coat of arms, this is fundamentally important. We just bring it into line with federal heraldic requirements".

Inspirations of the design included the former arms of subdivisions during the Russian Empire, and the provincial flag. After consultation, it was approved on April 23, 2020 by the Legislative Assembly and brought into law by Governor Alexander Burkov on April 29. The old arms can remain in use until January 1, 2030.

Flag of Omsk Oblast

The old arms of Omsk Oblast
