= UAN (disambiguation) =

UAN is a solution of urea and ammonium nitrate in water used as a fertilizer.

Uan or UAN may also refer to:

- Adapa, an alternate name for the first of the Mesopotamian seven sages
- Autonomous University of Nayarit (in Spanish: Universidad Autónoma de Nayarit), a Mexican public university based in the city of Tepic, Nayarit
- Kuan language (Laos), by ISO 639-3 language code
- United American Nurses, formerly an American union affiliated with the AFL-CIO
- Unione Accademica Nazionale (National Academic Union), a learned society in Italy
- Universal Account Number, a 12-digit number allotted to employee who is contributing to the Employees' Provident Fund Organisation of India

== People ==
- Uan Rasey (1921–2011), an American musician
- Mariuti Uan (born 1986), a sprinter from Kiribati
- Viktor Uan (born 1994), a Russian football defender
