= 2nd Fominovka =

2nd Fominovka 2-я Фоминовка
- Village
- Location within Omsk Oblast Location within Russia
- Coordinates: 54.8025°N 74.266667°E
- Country: Russia
- Region: Omsk Oblast
- District: Kormilovsky District
- Time zone: UTC+06:00

2nd Fominovka (Russian: 2-я Фоминовка) is a rural locality (a village) in Mikhaylovskoye Rural Settlement of Kormilovsky District, Russia. The population was 374 as of 2010.

== Geography ==
2nd Fominovka is located 30 km southeast of Kormilovka (the district's administrative centre) by road. 1st Fominovka is the nearest rural locality.

== Streets ==
- 60 let Oktyabrya
- Molodezhnaya
- Truda
