= Bolshiye Uki =

Rural locality in Omsk Oblast, Russia

Coordinates: 56°56′53″N 72°37′44″E

Bolshiye Uki (Russian: Больши́е Уки́) is a rural locality (a selo) and the administrative center of Bolsheukovsky District, Omsk Oblast, Russia. Population: 4,157 (2010 census); 4,384 (2002 census); 5,719 (1989 Soviet census).
