= 2672 km =

2672 km 2672 км
- Railway station
- Location within Omsk Oblast Location within Russia
- Coordinates: 55.091389°N 72.875°E
- Country: Russia
- Region: Omsk Oblast
- District: Lyubinsky District
- Time zone: UTC+6:00

2672 km (Russian: 2672 км) is a rural locality (a railway station) in Kamyshlovskoye Rural Settlement of Lyubinsky District, Russia. The population was 77 as of 2010.

== Streets ==
- Kalinina
- Rabochaya
- Tsentralnaya
