= Tyukalinsky District =

Tyukalinsky District Тюкалинский район (Russian)
- District
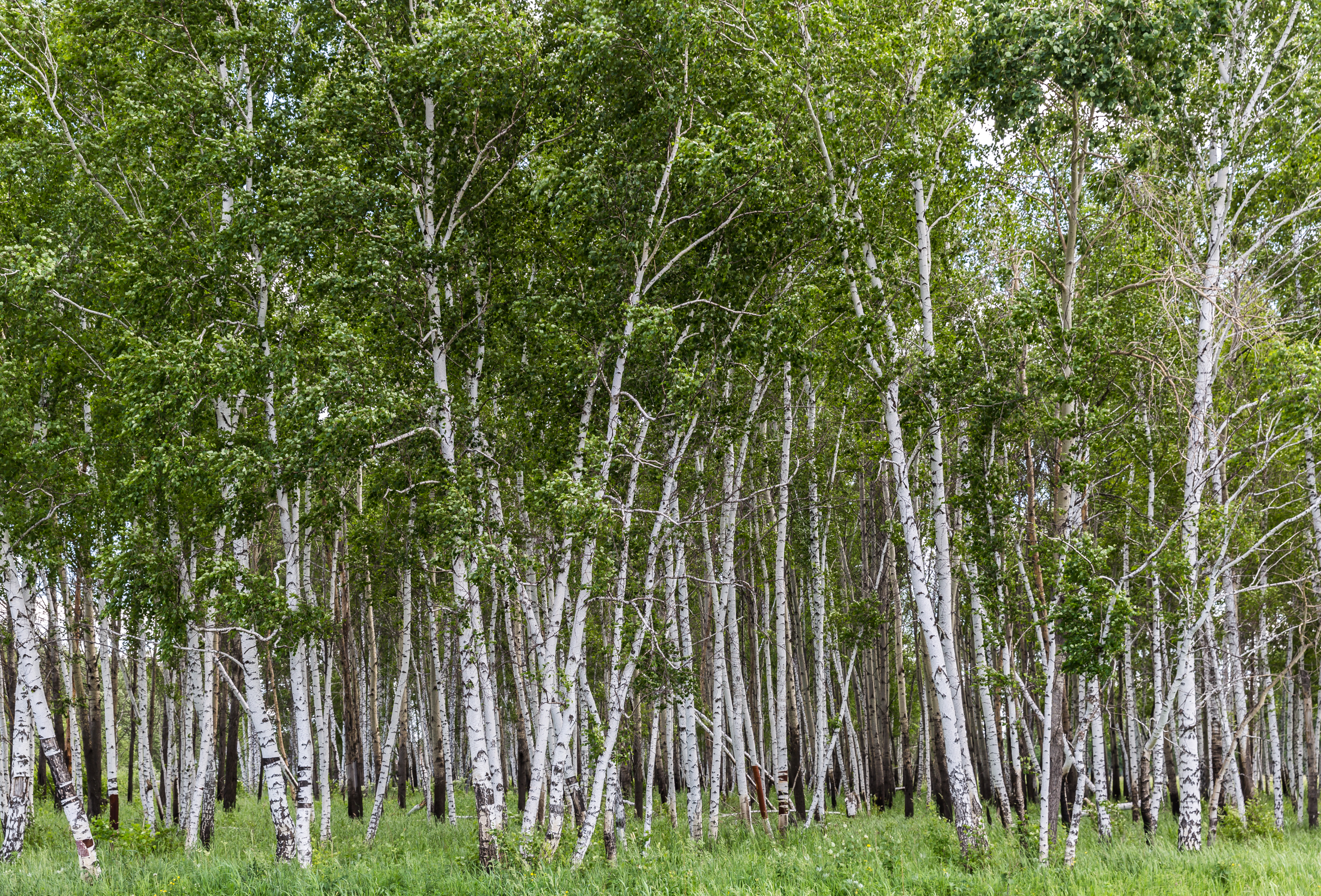
- Birch forest, Tyukalinsky District

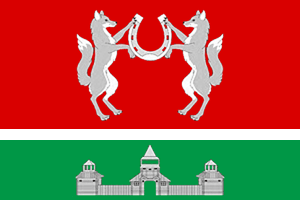
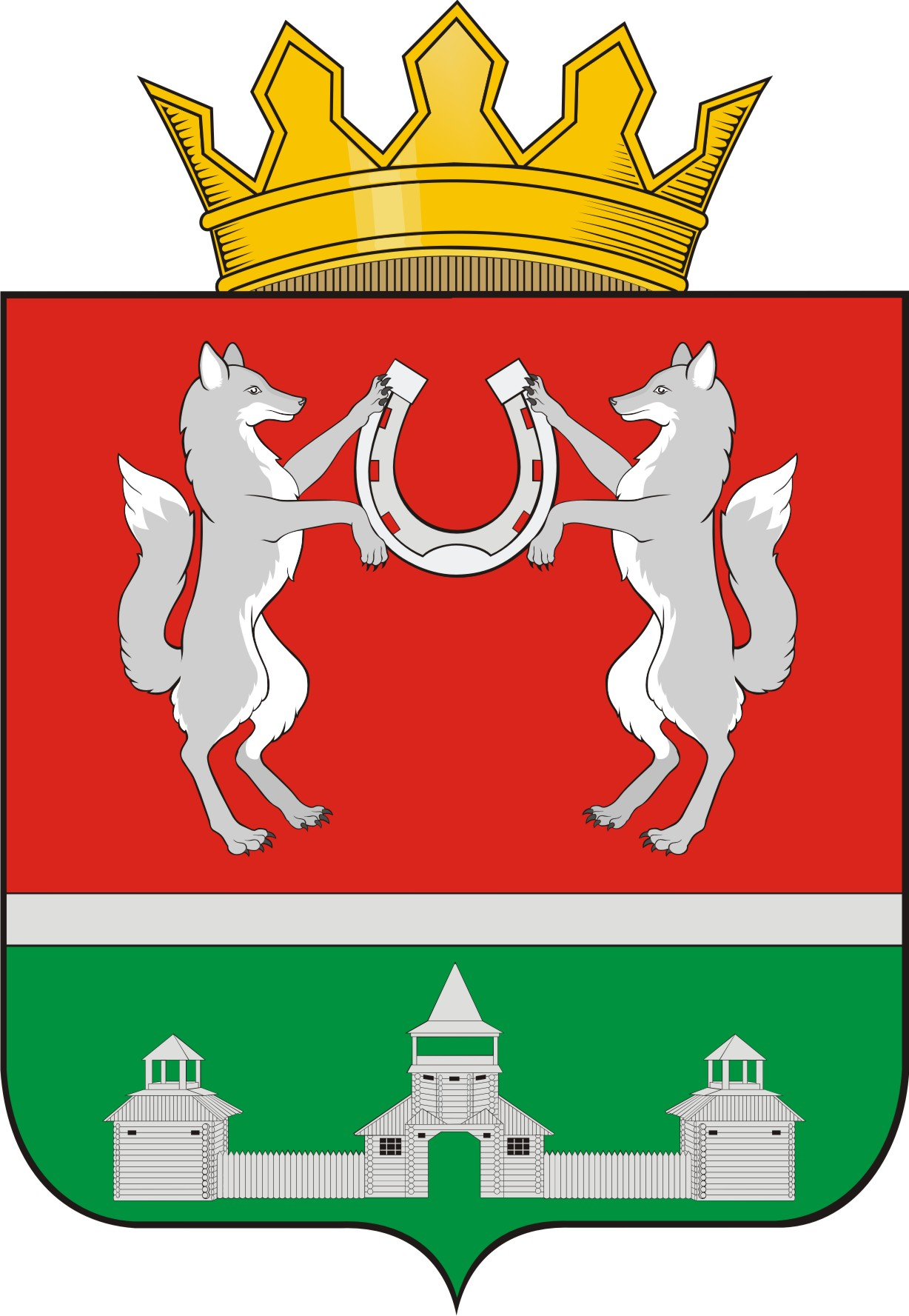
- Flag Coat of arms
- Location of Tyukalinsky District in Omsk Oblast
- Coordinates: 55°52′N 72°12′E
- Country: Russia
- Federal subject: Omsk Oblast
- Established: 25 May 1925
- Administrative center: Tyukalinsk

Area
  - Total: 6,400 km^{2} (2,500 sq mi)

Population (2010 Census)
  - Total: 14,831
  - Density: 2.3/km^{2} (6.0/sq mi)
  - Urban: 0%
  - Rural: 100%

Administrative structure
  - Administrative divisions: 16 rural okrug
  - Inhabited localities: 72 rural localities

Municipal structure
  - Municipally incorporated as: Tyukalinsky Municipal District
  - Municipal divisions: 1 urban settlements, 16 rural settlements
- Time zone: UTC+6 (MSK+3)
- OKTMO ID: 52656000
- Website: http://tukalin.omskportal.ru/

Tyukalinsky District (Russian: Тюкали́нский райо́н) is an administrative and municipal district (raion), one of the thirty-two in Omsk Oblast, Russia. It is located in the western central part of the oblast. The area of the district is 6,400 square kilometers (2,500 sq mi). Its administrative center is the town of Tyukalinsk (which is not administratively a part of the district). Population: 14,831 (2010 Census); 19,128 (2002 census); 22,430 (1989 Soviet census).

== History ==
The district was formed by the Decree of the All-Russian Central Executive Committee of 25 May 1925, by transforming the Tyukalinsky enlarged volost of the Tyukalinsky district of the Omsk province. The district became part of the Omsk district of the Siberian region.

== Administrative and municipal status ==
Within the framework of administrative divisions, Tyukalinsky District is one of the thirty-two in the oblast. The town of Tyukalinsk serves as its administrative center, despite being incorporated separately as a town of oblast significance—an administrative unit with the status equal to that of the districts.

As a municipal division, the district is incorporated as Tyukalinsky Municipal District, with the town of oblast significance of Tyukalinsk being incorporated within it as Tyukalinsk Urban Settlement.
