= XVI Partsezd =

XVI Partsezd XVI Партсъезд
- Village
- Location within Omsk Oblast Location within Russia
- Coordinates: 55.1°N 72.866667°E
- Country: Russia
- Region: Omsk Oblast
- District: Lyubinsky District
- Time zone: UTC+06:00

XVI Partsezd (Russian: XVI Партсъезд) is a rural locality (a village) in Kamyshlovskoye Rural Settlement of Lyubinsky District, Russia. The population was 315 as of 2010.

== Streets ==
- Kalinina
- Rabochaya
- Tsentralnaya

== Geography ==
XVI Partsezd is located 14 km southeast of Lyubinsky (the district's administrative centre) by road. Fyodorovka is the nearest rural locality.
