= Alexander Altunin =

Soviet general and politician (1921–1989)

Alexander Terentyevich Altunin
- Born: 14 August 1921; Steklyanka, Russian SFSR (now in Omsk Oblast, Russian Federation)
- Died: 15 July 1989 (aged 67); Moscow, Russian SFSR; Soviet Union
- Military career
- Allegiance: Soviet Union
- Branch: Red Army / Soviet Army
- Service years: 1939–1989
- Rank: General of the Army
- Commands: North Caucasus Military District (1968–1970); Civil Defense Forces of the USSR (1972–1986)
- Conflicts: World War II
- Awards: Hero of the Soviet Union

Alexander Terentyevich Altunin (Russian: Алекса́ндр Тере́нтьевич Алту́нин; 14 August 1921 – 15 July 1989) was a Soviet general and politician.

== Biography ==
Alexander Altunin was born to a peasant family of Russian ethnicity in the village of Steklyanka in the Russian Soviet Federative Socialist Republic (now in Omsk Oblast, Russian Federation).

He joined the Red Army in 1939 and graduated from an infantry school in Novosibirsk on 10 June 1941. He joined the Kharkov Military District in the Ukrainian SSR as a lieutenant on 22 June 1941, the day of Germany's invasion of the Soviet Union.

He fought in World War II and suffered wounds during the battles at Yartsevo (near Smolensk) in 1941 and during the 1941-1942 Battle of the Kerch Peninsula. He caught typhus while recovering from the latter wound in a military hospital in 1942 and subsequently served as a company training officer in the Volga Military District from April 1942. He joined the Communist Party of the Soviet Union and rejoined the front lines in 1943.

Altunin received the title Hero of the Soviet Union in 1944, having organized the establishment of a foothold across the Vistula during the Lvov-Sandomierz Offensive and led his men in tenaciously fighting off the German counterattack while distracting them from the Soviet troops' main landing point.

Promoted to major in November 1944, Altunin was sent to Frunze Military Academy in Bishkek in March 1945 and graduated in 1948. He served in the Turkestan Military District in the Uzbek SSR 1948-1955 and graduated from the Academy of the General Staff in 1957.

He served as commander of the North Caucasus Military District from June 1968 to October 1970. He was elected to the Supreme Soviet of the Soviet Union and made head of the personnel department of the Ministry of Defense of the USSR in 1970.

Altunin became a deputy minister of defense and director of the Civil Defense Forces of the USSR, the Soviet Union's civil defense and emergency management program, in 1972, as a colonel-general. He joined the Central Committee of the Communist Party of the Soviet Union in 1976 and was promoted to General of the Army in February 1977, but was replaced as head of the Civil Defense Forces by Vladimir Govorov after the 1986 Chernobyl disaster and instead appointed a member of the Group of Inspectors General of the Ministry of Defense.

Altunin was the author of publications dealing with civil defense as well as several works based on his experiences as a World War II officer.

He died in Moscow on 15 July 1989 and was interred at Novodevichy Cemetery.

== Honours and awards ==
- Hero of the Soviet Union
- Order of Lenin, four times
- Order of the Red Banner, twice
- Order of Alexander Nevsky
- Order of the Patriotic War, 1st class
- Order of the Red Star
- Order for Service to the Homeland in the Armed Forces of the USSR, 3rd class
