= Kolosovka, Omsk Oblast =

Kolosovka Колосовка
- Selo
- Interactive map of Kolosovka
- Location of Kolosovka Kolosovka (Omsk Oblast)
- Coordinates: 56°27′52″N 73°36′41″E
- Country: Russia
- Federal subject: Omsk Oblast
- Administrative district: Kolosovsky District
- Founded: 1626

Population (2010 Census)
  - Total: 5,313
  - Estimate (2021): 4,836 (−9%)

Administrative status
  - Capital of: Kolosovsky District
- Time zone: UTC+6 (MSK+3)
- Postal code: 646350
- OKTMO ID: 52621407101

Kolosovka (Russian: Колосовка) is a rural locality (a selo) and the administrative center of Kolosovsky District of Omsk Oblast, Russia, located on the Osha River. Population: 5,313 (2010 census); 5,829 (2002 census); 5,891 (1989 Soviet census).
