= Baykal, Omsk Oblast =

Rural locality in Kormilovsky District, Omsk Oblast, Russia

Coordinates: 55°05′38″N 73°58′04″E

Baykal (Russian: Байка́л) is a village in Kormilovsky District of Omsk Oblast, Russia.
