= 18 Partsezd =

18 Partsezd 18 Партсъезд
- Village
- Location within Omsk Oblast Location within Russia
- Coordinates: 55.113889°N 73.646667°E
- Country: Russia
- Region: Omsk Oblast
- District: Omsky District
- Time zone: UTC+06:00

18 Partsezd (Russian: 18 Партсъезд) is a rural locality (a village) in Andreyevskoye Rural Settlement of Omsky District, Russia. The population was 234 as of 2010.

== Geography ==
18 Partsezd is located 40 km north of Rostovka (the district's administrative centre) by road. Khvoyny is the nearest rural locality.

== Streets ==
- Molodezhnaya
- Proizvodstvennaya
- Tsentralnaya
