= 2595 km =

2595 km 2595 км
- Railway station
- Location within Omsk Oblast Location within Russia
- Coordinates: 55.422222°N 71.801944°E
- Country: Russia
- Region: Omsk Oblast
- District: Nazyvayevsky District
- Time zone: UTC+6:00

2595 km (Russian: 2595 км) is a rural locality (a railway station) in Cheremnovskoye Rural Settlement of Nazyvayevsky District, Russia. The population was 39 as of 2010.

== Streets ==
- Vokzalnaya
- Putevaya
