= John Kornievsky =

Catholic priest (1910–1984)

John Kornievsky (February 20, 1910, in Okonechnik, Omsk Oblast – June 13, 1984, in USSR) was a Russian Greek Catholic priest, and a member of Russian apostolate in the Diaspora.

== Biography ==
Born on February 20, 1910, in an Orthodox family of a prosperous farmer. In 1928, to avoid expropriation, the family moved to Ukraine. After high school Kornievsky served in the Army, was a quartermaster and was promoted to Major. During World War II he was captured, and then ended up in Belgium and refused to return to the USSR, and more late adopted Catholicism. In 1950 Kornievsky entered at Russicum in Rome and was ordained to the priesthood on the Byzantine rite in 1955. From 1956 he is engaged in pastoral work in Germany, and then worked in Belgium]in the Russian Catholic publishing house, "Life with God", collaborated with Bishop Paul Meletiou. In 1958 was the secretary of the Association of Alumni Russicum priests. In 1962 (the date of 1968, apparently mistaken), arrived on holiday in Finland, appealed to the Soviet consulate requesting visa for tourist visits to the Soviet Union and was arrested (as he was in search lists as defector) and unconscious smuggled Soviet territory. The Western press, it was announced that the priest was missing. Kornievsky was tried on charges of espionage, then abandoned Belgian nationality and was rehabilitated, was finally reunited with his family and lived in Zaporizhia, and exercised his Catholic priest services at his apartment. Died on June 12, 1984, and his body was buried in the town cemetery.

== Publications ==
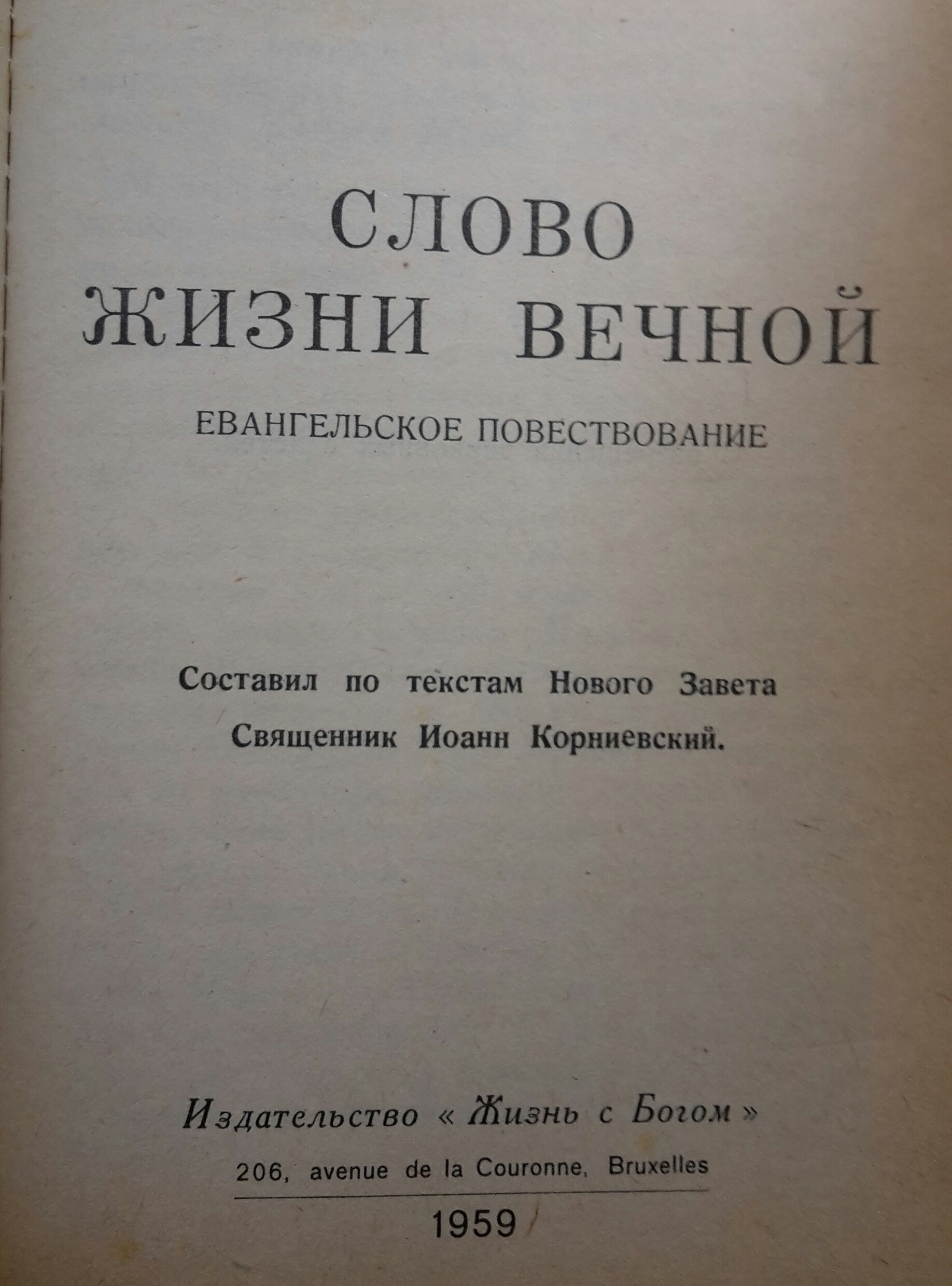
The title page of the book "The Word of Eternal Life" compiled and prepared for printing by the publishing house "Life with God" by I. Kornievsky in 1959.

- Father John Kornievsky - author of "The Gospel for Children" published in Italy translator Gospel in Russian language (Belgium, "Life with God", 1959 ).
- John Kornievsky, Fr. "The Word of Eternal Life". The publishing house "Life with God", 1959.
