= Znamenskoye, Omsk Oblast =

Znamenskoye Знаменское
- Selo
- Interactive map of Znamenskoye
- Location of Znamenskoye Znamenskoye (Omsk Oblast)
- Coordinates: 57°07′40″N 73°49′28″E
- Country: Russia
- Federal subject: Omsk Oblast
- Administrative district: Znamensky District
- Founded: 1666
- Elevation: 67 m (220 ft)

Population (2010 Census)
  - Total: 5,294
  - Estimate (2021): 5,223 (−1.3%)

Administrative status
  - Capital of: Znamensky District
- Time zone: UTC+6 (MSK+3)
- Postal code: 646550
- OKTMO ID: 52612407101

Znamenskoye (Russian: Знаменское) is a rural locality (a selo) and the administrative center of Znamensky District of Omsk Oblast, Russia, located on the Irtysh River. Population: 5,294 (2010 census); 5,457 (2002 census); 5,567 (1989 Soviet census).
