= Tyukalinsk =

Town in Omsk Oblast, Russia

Tyukalinsk Тюкалинск
- Town
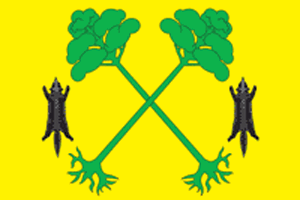
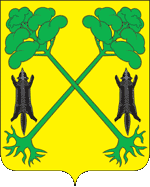
- Flag Coat of arms
- Interactive map of Tyukalinsk
- Location of Tyukalinsk Tyukalinsk (Omsk Oblast)
- Coordinates: 55°52′N 72°12′E
- Country: Russia
- Federal subject: Omsk Oblast
- Founded: 1759
- Town status since: 1823
- Elevation: 115 m (377 ft)

Population (2010 Census)
  - Total: 11,275
  - Estimate (2023): 9,732 (−13.7%)

Administrative status
  - Subordinated to: town of oblast significance of Tyukalinsk
  - Capital of: Tyukalinsky District, town of oblast significance of Tyukalinsk

Municipal status
  - Municipal district: Tyukalinsky Municipal District
  - Urban settlement: Tyukalinsk Urban Settlement
  - Capital of: Tyukalinsky Municipal District, Tyukalinsk Urban Settlement
- Time zone: UTC+6 (MSK+3)
- Postal codes: 646330–646334, 646339
- Dialing code: +7 38176
- OKTMO ID: 52656101001

Tyukalinsk (Russian: Тюкали́нск) is a town in Omsk Oblast, Russia, located 60 kilometers (37 mi) northeast of the Nazyvayevsk railway station on the Trans-Siberian Railway and 120 kilometers (75 mi) northwest of Omsk, the administrative center of the oblast. Population: 9,559 (2025); 9,894 (2021 census); 11,275 (2010 census); 12,007 (2002 census); 12,191 (1989 Soviet census).

== History ==
In 1759, a post station of Tyukalinsky Stanets (Тюкалинский станец) existed on the Tyukala River in place of modern Tyukalinsk. It developed into the sloboda of Tyukalinskaya (Тюкалинская) in 1763. In 1823, it was granted town status, which was retracted in 1838, and reinstated in 1878. Tyukalinsk lost its commercial importance along with the Siberian Route after the construction of the Trans-Siberian Railway. On the outskirts of the town is a geoglyph made of pine trees that spell out "Lenin" (Ленин). Called "Lenin forest" by locals it was supposedly made in 1970, Vladimir Lenin's 100th birthday, though the exact date remains unknown. It is visible in satellite photographs at 55.8476°N 72.1722°E.

== Administrative and municipal status ==
Within the framework of administrative divisions, Tyukalinsk serves as the administrative center of Tyukalinsky District, even though it is not a part of it. As an administrative division, it is incorporated separately as the town of oblast significance of Tyukalinsk—an administrative unit with the status equal to that of the districts. As a municipal division, the town of oblast significance of Tyukalinsk is incorporated within Tyukalinsky Municipal District as Tyukalinsk Urban Settlement.
