= Baykal, Vysokogorsky District, Republic of Tatarstan =

Rural locality in Vysokogorsky District, Tatarstan

Coordinates: 55°59′22″N 49°27′57″E

Baykal (Russian: Байкал; Tatar: Байкал) is a village in Vysokogorsky District of the Republic of Tatarstan, Russia, situated 15 kilometers (9.3 mi) south-east of Vysokaya Gora, the administrative center of the district. The village is situated on the Kazanka River. Baykal's population was 51 in 1989, 28 in 1997 and 24 in 2000; mostly ethnic Tatars (as on 1989). The main occupation of the residents is agriculture. There is a club in the village. It was founded in 1930.
