= Tenis =

Lake in Russia

- Тенис
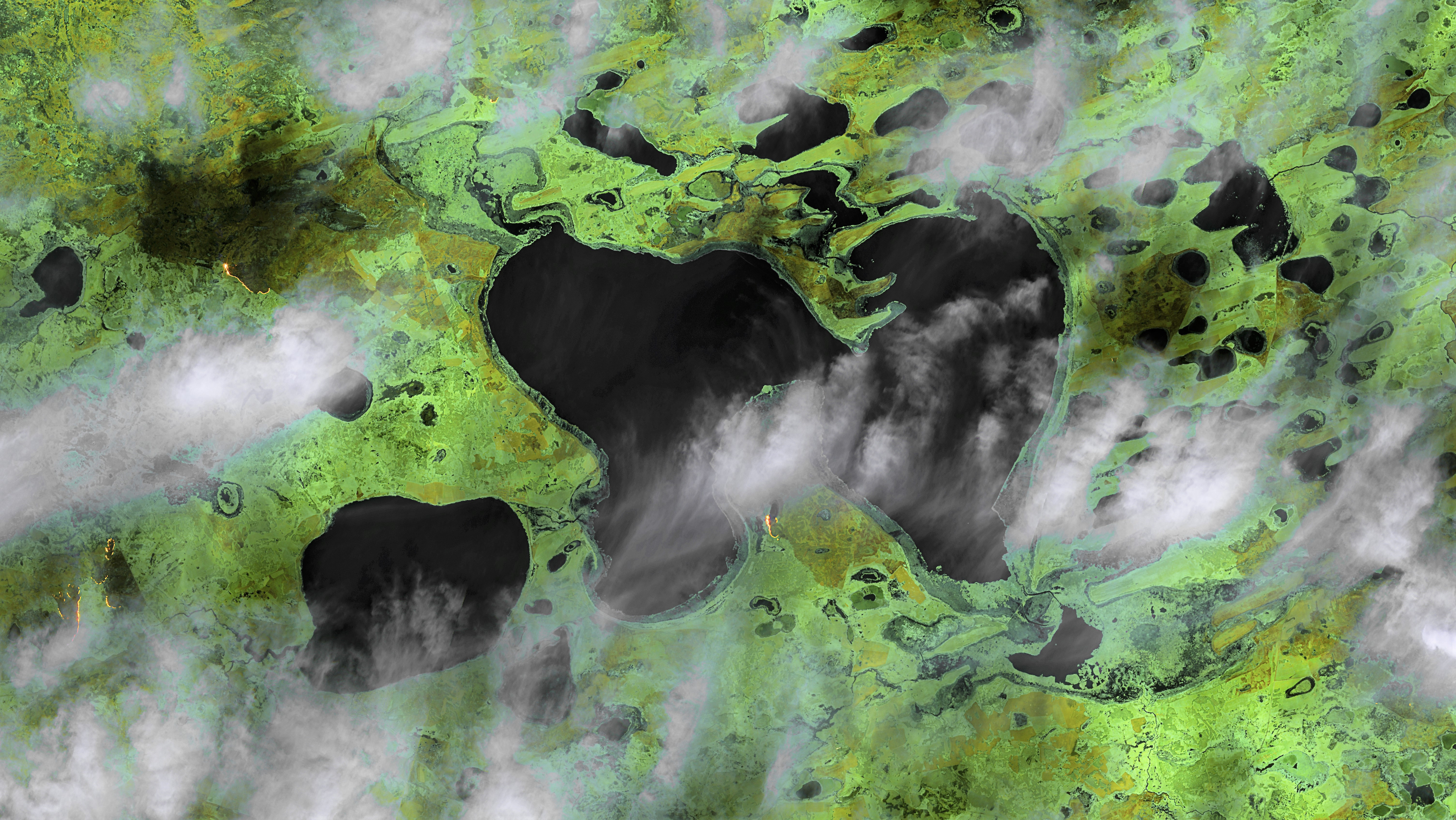
- Sentinel-2 picture of the Krutinka Lakes with lake Tenis in the middle

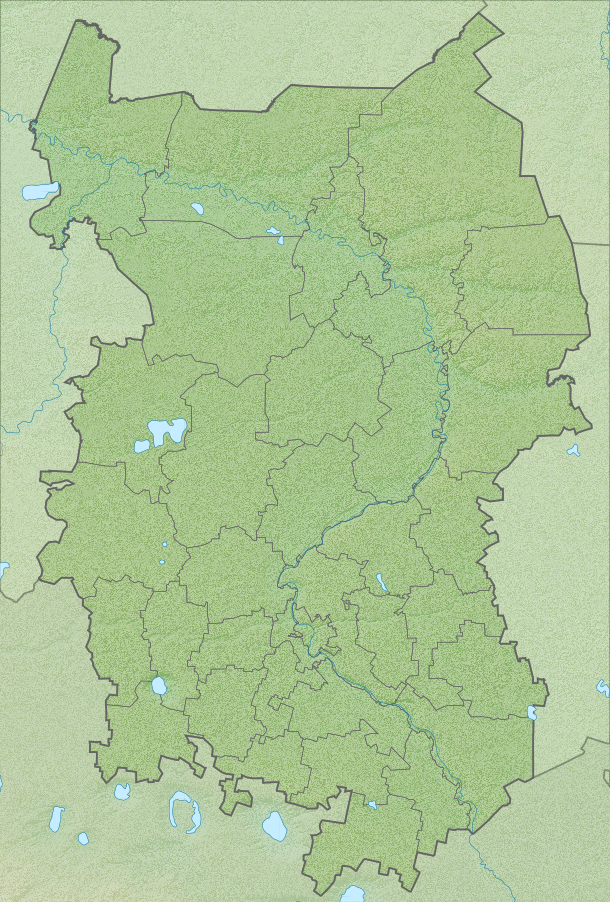
- Location within Russia Location within Omsk Oblast
- Location: Ishim Steppe; West Siberian Plain
- Coordinates: 56°08′N 71°53′E
- Primary inflows: Osha
- Primary outflows: Osha
- Catchment area: 10,700 square kilometers (4,100 sq mi)
- Basin countries: Russia
- Max. length: 24 kilometers (15 mi)
- Max. width: 17 kilometers (11 mi)
- Surface area: 98 square kilometers (38 sq mi)
- Max. depth: 4 meters (13 ft)
- Surface elevation: 118 meters (387 ft)
- Islands: None

Tenis (Russian: Тенис) is a lake in the southern part of the West Siberian Plain, Omsk Oblast, south-central Russia.

The lake is an Important Bird Area, especially for the Dalmatian pelican, and is part of a 30,000 hectares (74,000 acres) protected area. The name is probably from teŋiz, the Siberian Tatar word for "sea".

== Geography ==
The waters of Tenis are fresh. The western section of the lake is also known as Saltaim. Both parts are connected by a sound over 2 kilometers (1.2 mi) wide. The Tenis-Saltaim lake is the largest of the Krutinka Lake group. The Ust-Logatka and Ust-Kiterna settlements of Krutinsky District are located by the lake. The Osha river flows across Tenis and minor rivers such as the Karasuk, Balka-Sukhaya and Tleutsay flow into it. The shores are generally low, they are marshy in some places. Very close to the north lies a cluster of smaller lakes, including Synkul, Kalykul, Sazykul, Gorkoye and Achikul.

Lake Ik, the second largest lake of the group, is located nearby to the southwest.

== Fauna ==
Among the fish species found in the waters of the Tenis/Saltaim, crucian carp, pike, zander, perch, bream and carp are worth mentioning.

== See also ==
- List of lakes of Russia
