= Baykal, Aurgazinsky District, Republic of Bashkortostan =

Baykal Байкал
- Village
- Location within Bashkortostan Location within Russia
- Coordinates: 53°55′34″N 55°53′05″E
- Country: Russia
- Region: Bashkortostan
- District: Aurgazinsky District
- Time zone: UTC+5:00

Baykal (Russian: Байка́л) is a village in Balyklykulsky Selsoviet, Aurgazinsky District of the Republic of Bashkortostan, Russia.
