= Nizhnyaya Omka, Nizhneomsky Rural Okrug, Nizhneomsky District, Omsk Oblast =

Rural locality in Omsk Oblast, Russia

Coordinates: 55°25′45″N 74°56′27″E

Nizhnyaya Omka (Russian: Нижняя Омка) is a rural locality (a selo) and the administrative center of Nizhneomsky District, Omsk Oblast, Russia. Population: 4,821 (2010 census); 5,310 (2002 census); 5,361 (1989 Soviet census).
