= Kalachinsk =

Town in Omsk Oblast, Russia

Kalachinsk Калачинск
- Town
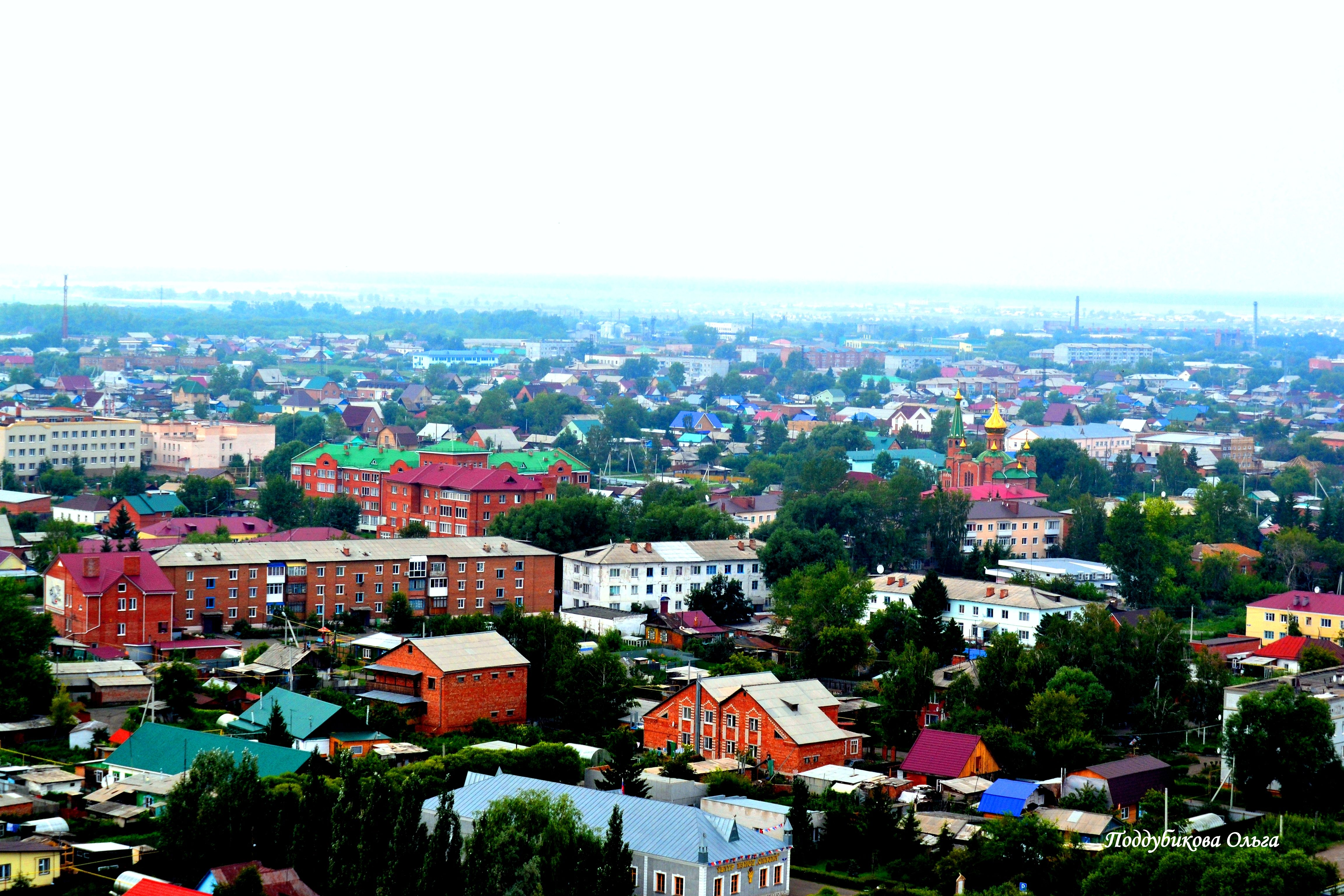
- View of Kalachinsk

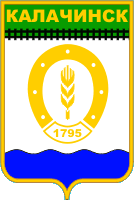
- Coat of arms
- Interactive map of Kalachinsk
- Location of Kalachinsk Kalachinsk (Omsk Oblast)
- Coordinates: 55°03′N 74°35′E
- Country: Russia
- Federal subject: Omsk Oblast
- Founded: 1794
- Elevation: 100 m (330 ft)

Population (2010 Census)
  - Total: 23,556
  - Estimate (2023): 20,825 (−11.6%)

Administrative status
  - Subordinated to: town of oblast significance of Kalachinsk
  - Capital of: Kalachinsky District, town of oblast significance of Kalachinsk

Municipal status
  - Municipal district: Kalachinsky Municipal District
  - Urban settlement: Kalachinsk Urban Settlement
  - Capital of: Kalachinsky Municipal District, Kalachinsk Urban Settlement
- Time zone: UTC+6 (MSK+3)
- Postal codes: 646900–646906, 646909
- OKTMO ID: 52618101001
- Website: www.kalachinsk.info

Kalachinsk (Russian: Кала́чинск) is a town in Omsk Oblast, Russia, located on the Om River along the busiest segment of the Trans-Siberian Railway, 100 kilometers (62 mi) east of Omsk, the administrative center of the oblast. Population: 23,556 (2010 census); 24,247 (2002 census); 25,014 (1989 Soviet census).

== Administrative and municipal status ==
Within the framework of administrative divisions, Kalachinsk serves as the administrative center of Kalachinsky District, even though it is not a part of it. As an administrative division, it is incorporated separately as the town of oblast significance of Kalachinsk—an administrative unit with the status equal to that of the districts. As a municipal division, the town of oblast significance of Kalachinsk is incorporated within Kalachinsky Municipal District as Kalachinsk Urban Settlement.

== Economy ==
In the Soviet days of restricted commerce, the town acquired local fame for its weekend market. Fueled by visitors from Kalachinsk arriving by elektrichkas (trains) to Omsk, the Omsk open-air flea markets thrived here.

There are two new agricultural plants built in the town.
