= Vysokaya Gora =

Set index of articles associated with the same name

Vysokaya Gora (Russian: Высо́кая Гора́) is the name of several rural localities in Russia:

- Vysokaya Gora, Arkhangelsk Oblast, a village in Rovdinsky Selsoviet of Shenkursky District of Arkhangelsk Oblast
- Vysokaya Gora, Kaluga Oblast, a village in Baryatinsky District of Kaluga Oblast
- Vysokaya Gora, Kirov Oblast, a village in Ust-Lyuginsky Rural Okrug of Vyatskopolyansky District of Kirov Oblast
- Vysokaya Gora, Komi Republic, a village in Ust-Tsilma Selo Administrative Territory of Ust-Tsilemsky District of the Komi Republic
- Vysokaya Gora, Novgorod Oblast, a village in Polnovskoye Settlement of Demyansky District of Novgorod Oblast
- Vysokaya Gora, Pskov Oblast, a village in Opochetsky District of Pskov Oblast
- Vysokaya Gora, Republic of Tatarstan, a selo in Vysokogorsky District of the Republic of Tatarstan
- Vysokaya Gora, Vologda Oblast, a village in Vizmensky Selsoviet of Belozersky District of Vologda Oblast

== See also ==
- zheleznodorozhnoy stantsii Vysokaya Gora, a settlement in Vysokogorsky District of the Republic of Tatarstan
- 203 Hill
