= Moskalenki, Omsk Oblast =

Moskalenki Москаленки
- Town
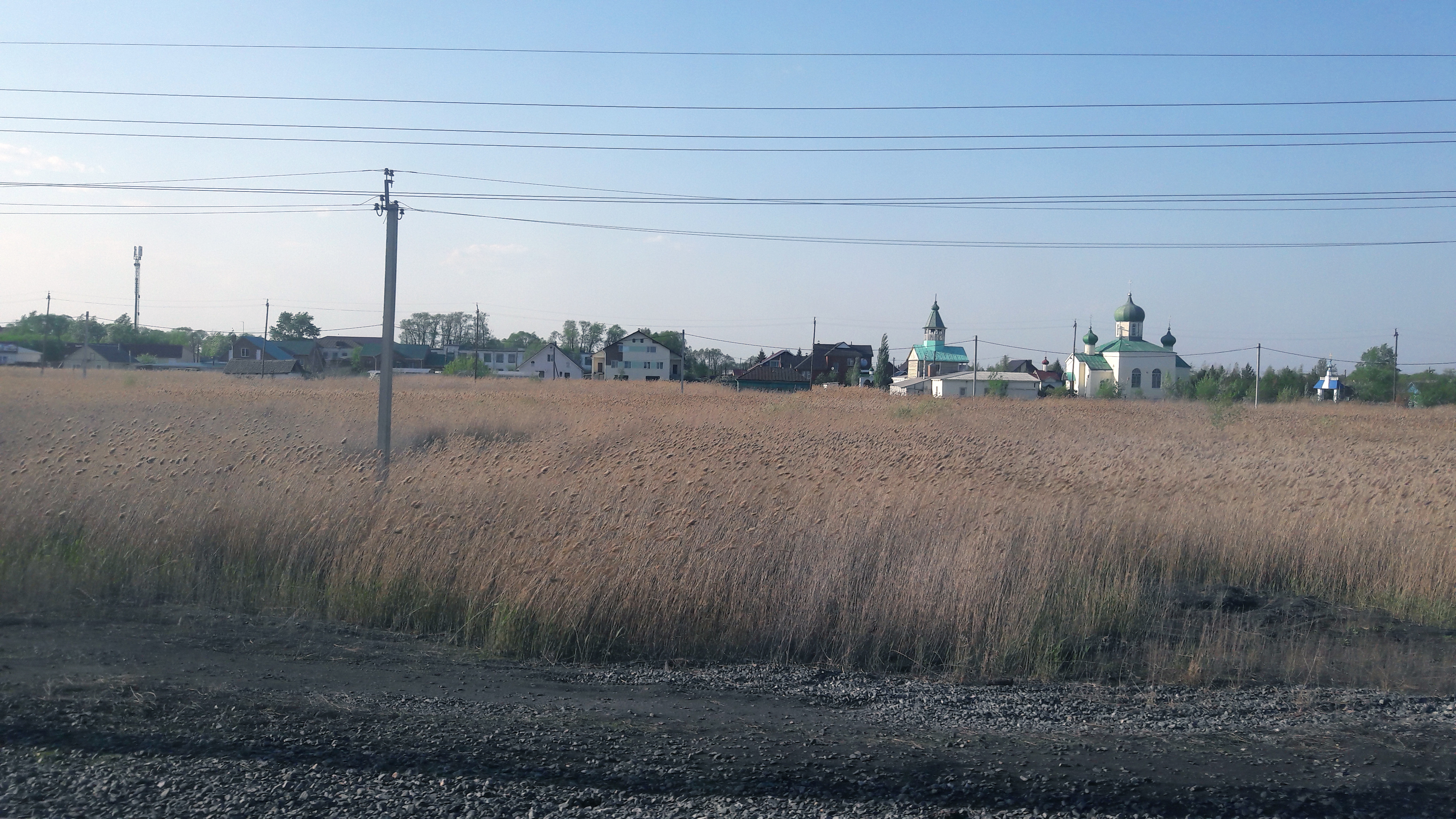
- View of Moskalenki

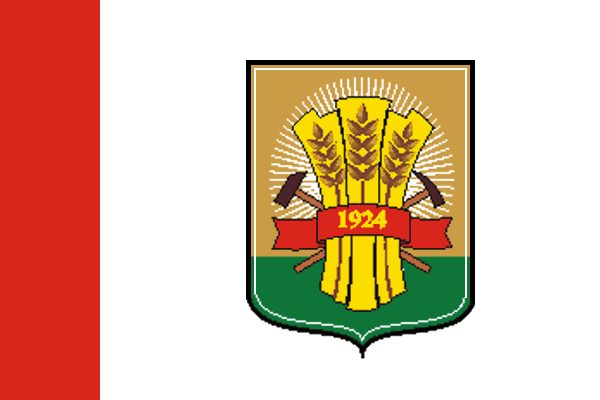
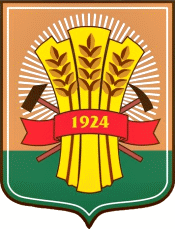
- Flag Coat of arms
- Interactive map of Moskalenki
- Location of Moskalenki Moskalenki (Omsk Oblast)
- Coordinates: 54°56′N 71°56′E
- Country: Russia
- Federal subject: Omsk Oblast
- Founded: 1894
- Elevation: 118 m (387 ft)

Population (2010 Census)
  - Total: 9,271
  - Estimate (2025): 8,985 (−3.1%)

Administrative status
  - Subordinated to: town of oblast significance of Moskalenki
  - Capital of: Moskalensky District, town of oblast significance of Moskalenki
- Time zone: UTC+6 (MSK+3)
- Postal code: 646070
- Dialing code: +7 38174
- OKTMO ID: 52632151051

Moskalenki (Russian: Москаленки) is an urban-type settlement in the Moskalensky District in Omsk Oblast, Russia. In 2017 the population was 9,271.

== Geography ==
Moskalenki is located on the Trans-Siberian Railway. It is located next to Yekaterinovka, Golbshtadt, and 86 kilometers (53 mi) west of Omsk, the administrative center of the oblast.

== History ==
The place was founded for the railway station Kotshubayevo in 1894 and was renamed into Moskalenki in 1905. Villages were built around the railway station which were called Olgino and changed its name to Moskalenki (like the railway station) in 1969

The settlements around Moskalenki used to be inhabited mainly by German-speaking Russian Mennonites, which immigrated to Moskalenki from Ukraine in the 20th century. Plautdietsch is still spoken by them.
