= Viktor Uan =

Russian footballer

Personal information
- Full name: Viktor Vladimirovich Uan
- Date of birth: 19 August 1994 (age 32)
- Place of birth: Kormilovsky District, Russia
- Height: 1.89 m (6 ft 2 in)
- Positions: Midfielder; defender

Senior career*
Years	Team	Apps	(Gls)
2013–2015	FC Irtysh Omsk	57	(6)
2016	FC Fakel Voronezh	3	(0)
2016	FC Nosta Novotroitsk	16	(4)
2017	FC Zenit-Izhevsk	1	(0)
2017	FC Neftekhimik Nizhnekamsk	5	(0)
2019	FC Nosta Novotroitsk	9	(0)
2019–2020	FC Chita	12	(1)
2020–2021	FC Lada Dimitrovgrad	8	(1)
- * Club domestic league appearances and goals

Viktor Vladimirovich Uan (Russian: Виктор Владимирович Уан; born 19 August 1994) is a Russian former football player.

== Club career ==
He made his debut in the Russian Second Division for FC Irtysh Omsk on 25 April 2013 in a game against FC Yakutiya Yakutsk.

He made his Russian Football National League debut for FC Fakel Voronezh on 12 March 2016 in a game against FC Tyumen.
