= Znamensky District, Omsk Oblast =

Znamensky District Знаменский район (Russian)
- District
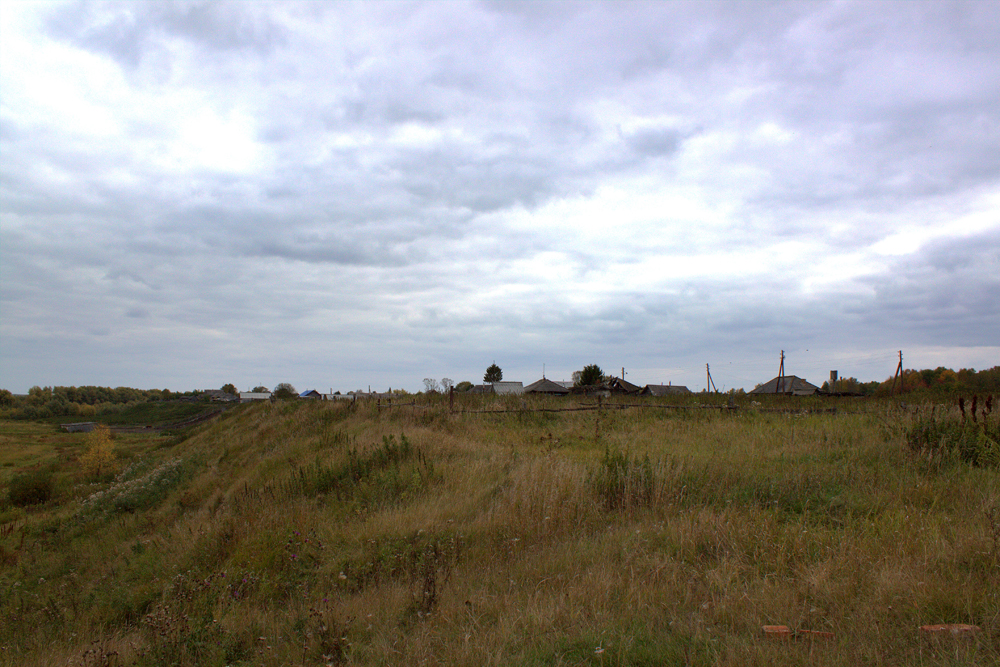
- Village Butakovo, Znamensky District

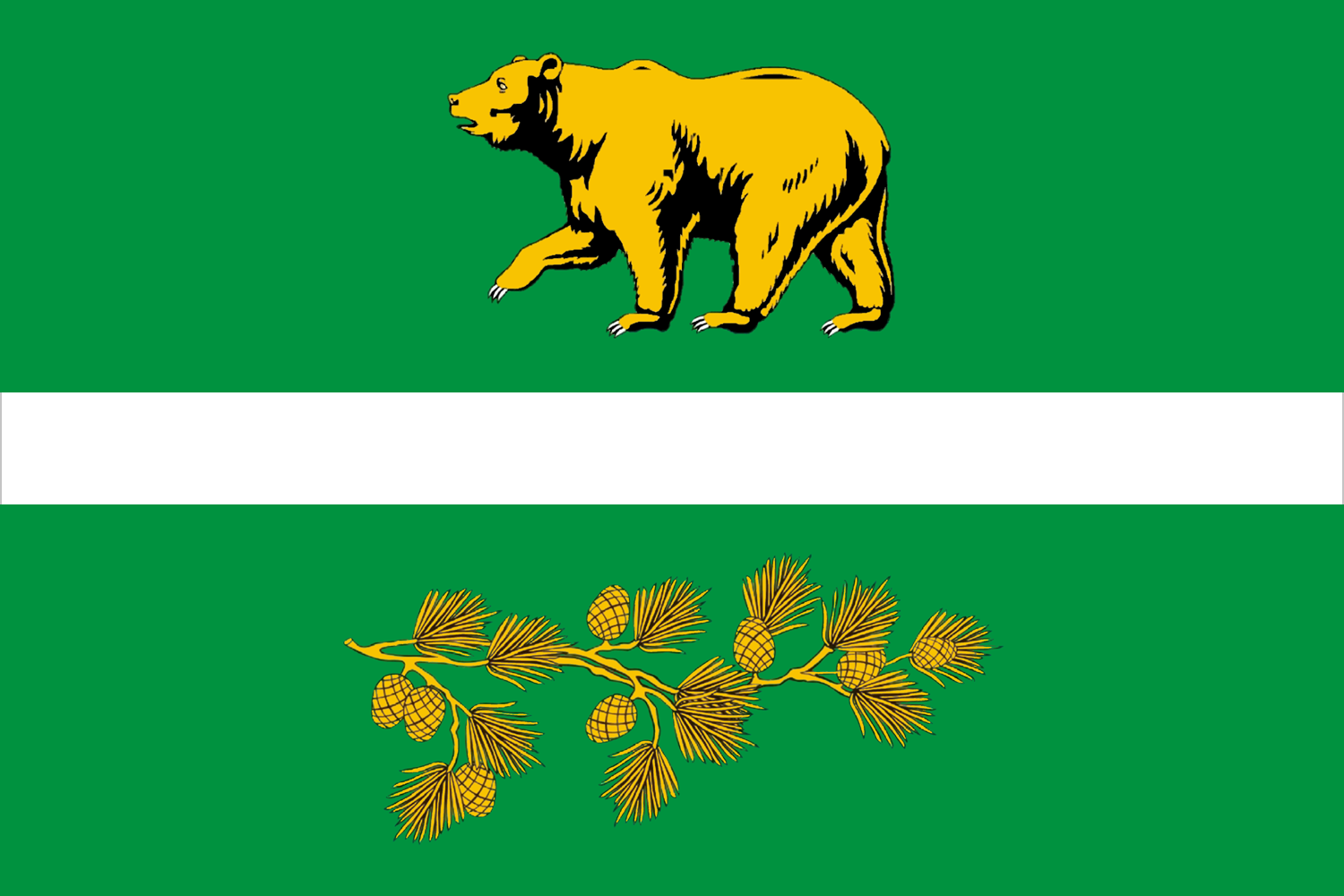
- Flag
- Location of Znamensky District inOmsk Oblast
- Coordinates: 57°07′40″N 73°49′28″E
- Country: Russia
- Federal subject: Omsk Oblast
- Established: 1925
- Administrative center: Znamenskoye

Area
  - Total: 3,700 km^{2} (1,400 sq mi)

Population (2010 Census)
  - Total: 12,427
  - Density: 3.4/km^{2} (8.7/sq mi)
  - Urban: 0%
  - Rural: 100%

Administrative structure
  - Administrative divisions: 8 rural okrug
  - Inhabited localities: 40 rural localities

Municipal structure
  - Municipally incorporated as: Znamensky Municipal District
  - Municipal divisions: 0 urban settlements, 8 rural settlements
- Time zone: UTC+6 (MSK+3)
- OKTMO ID: 52612000
- Website: http://znam.omskportal.ru/

Znamensky District (Russian: Зна́менский райо́н) is an administrative and municipal district (raion), one of the thirty-two in Omsk Oblast, Russia. It is located in the north of the oblast. The area of the district is 3,700 square kilometers (1,400 sq mi). Its administrative center is the rural locality (a selo) of Znamenskoye. Population: 12,427 (2010 Census); 13,876 (2002 census); 15,046 (1989 Soviet census). The population of Znamenskoye accounts for 42.6% of the district's total population.

== Population ==
Russians 90.59%, Tatars 6.22%, Germans 0.96%, Ukrainians 0.52%. Other ethnic groups make up additional 1.71%.
