= Osha (river) =

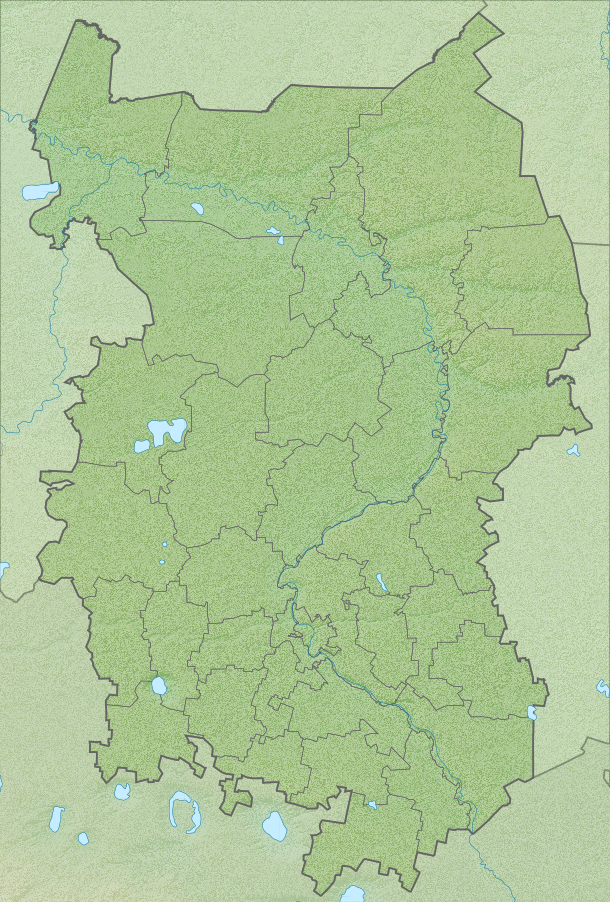
- Mouth location in Omsk Oblast

Physical characteristics
- Mouth: Irtysh
  - coordinates: 57°12′42″N 73°40′13″E
- Length: 530 km (330 mi)
- Basin size: 21,300 km^{2} (8,200 sq mi)

Basin features
- Progression: Irtysh→ Ob→ Kara Sea

The Osha (Russian: Оша) is a river in Omsk Oblast, Russia, a left tributary of the Irtysh. It is 530 kilometres (330 mi) long, and has a drainage basin of 21,300 square kilometres (8,200 sq mi). The river flows across lake Tenis.
