= Kormilovka =

Kormilovka Кормиловка
- Urban-type settlement
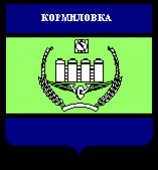
- Coat of arms
- Interactive map of Kormilovka
- Location of Kormilovka Kormilovka (Omsk Oblast)
- Coordinates: 55°0′3″N 74°5′41″E
- Country: Russia
- Federal subject: Omsk Oblast
- Administrative district: Kormilovsky District
- Founded: 1896

Population (2010 Census)
  - Total: 9,616
  - Estimate (2023): 9,088 (−5.5%)
- Time zone: UTC+6 (MSK+3)
- Postal code: 646970
- OKTMO ID: 52623151051

Kormilovka (Russian: Кормиловка) is an urban locality (a work settlement) and the administrative center of Kormilovsky District of Omsk Oblast, Russia, located 50 kilometers (31 mi) east of Omsk. Population: 9,616 (2010 census); 10,290 (2002 census); 9,785 (1989 Soviet census).
