= Nizhneomsky District =

Nizhneomsky District Нижнеомский район (Russian)
- District
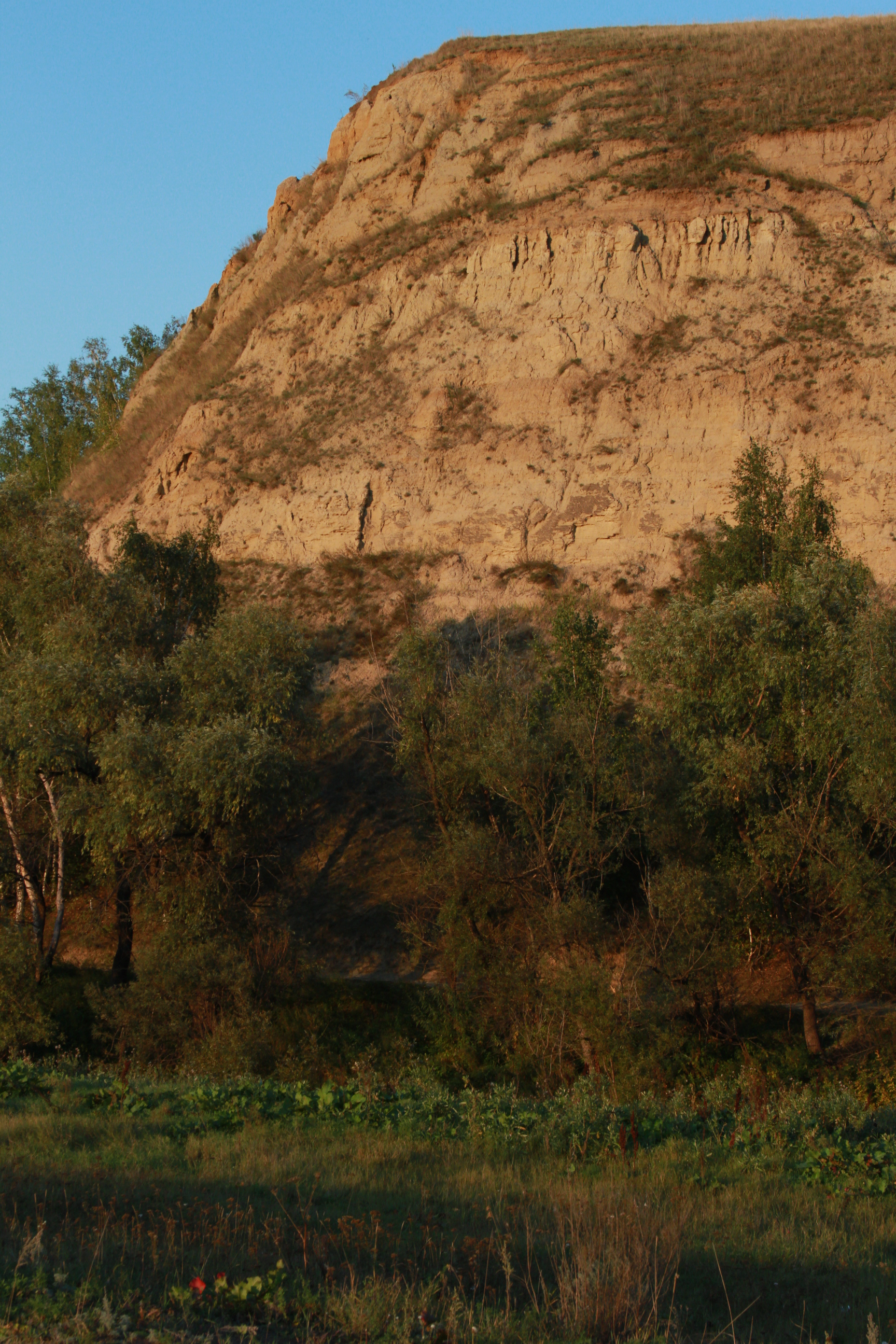
- Bare cliff in Nizhneomsky District

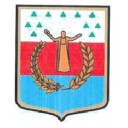
- Coat of arms
- Location of Nizhneomsky District in Omsk Oblast
- Coordinates: 55°26′03″N 74°56′21″E
- Country: Russia
- Federal subject: Omsk Oblast
- Established: 1940
- Administrative center: Nizhnyaya Omka

Area
  - Total: 3,400 km^{2} (1,300 sq mi)

Population (2010 Census)
  - Total: 15,826
  - Density: 4.7/km^{2} (12/sq mi)
  - Urban: 0%
  - Rural: 100%

Administrative structure
  - Administrative divisions: 11 rural okrug
  - Inhabited localities: 52 rural localities

Municipal structure
  - Municipally incorporated as: Nizhneomsky Municipal District
  - Municipal divisions: 0 urban settlements, 11 rural settlements
- Time zone: UTC+6 (MSK+3)
- OKTMO ID: 52639000
- Website: http://www.omskportal.ru/ru/government/spravochnik/municipal/3-52-239-1.html

Nizhneomsky District (Russian: Нижнео́мский райо́н) is an administrative and municipal district (raion), one of the thirty-two in Omsk Oblast, Russia. It is located in the east of the oblast. The area of the district is 3,400 square kilometers (1,300 sq mi). Its administrative center is the rural locality (a selo) of Nizhnyaya Omka. Population: 15,826 (2010 Census); 19,766 (2002 census); 21,779 (1989 Soviet census). The population of the administrative center accounts for 30.5% of the district's total population.
