= Baykal, Arsky District, Republic of Tatarstan =

Rural locality in Arça District, Tatarstan, Russia

Coordinates: 56°30′19″N 49°44′40″E

Baykal (Russian: Байкал; Tatar: Байкал) is a village in Arsky District of the Republic of Tatarstan, Russia, situated 52 kilometers (32 mi) south of Arsk, the administrative center of the district, on the border with Mari El Republic. Baykal's population was 333 in 1989, 315 in 1997 and 291 in 2000; mostly ethnic Tatars (as on 1989). The main occupations of the residents are agriculture and cattle breeding. There is a primary school in the village. It was founded in the 18th century as Yaña Tazlar, in 1941 it was renamed Baykal.
