= Baykal, Novosibirsk Oblast =

Baykal Байкал
- Village
- Location within Novosibirsk Oblast Location within Russia
- Coordinates: 55°38′25″N 83°53′24″E
- Country: Russia
- Region: Novosibirsk Oblast
- District: Bolotninsky District
- Time zone: UTC+6:00

Baykal (Russian: Байка́л) is a village in Bolotninsky District of Novosibirsk Oblast, Russia. Population: 546 (2010 census); 587 (2002 census);
