= Kolosovsky District =

Kolosovsky District Колосовский район
- District
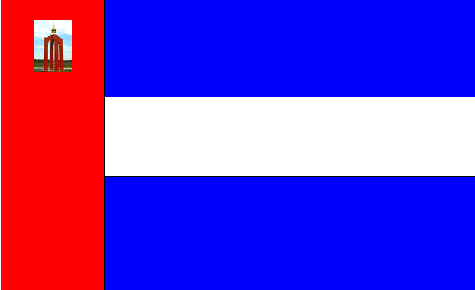
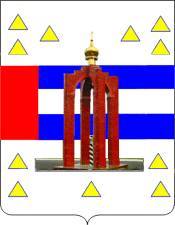
- Flag Coat of arms
- Location of Kolosovsky District in Omsk Oblast
- Coordinates: 56°27′52″N 73°36′41″E
- Country: Russia
- Federal subject: Omsk Oblast
- Established: 1925
- Administrative center: Kolosovka

Area
  - Total: 4,700 km^{2} (1,800 sq mi)

Population (2010 Census)
  - Total: 12,803
  - Density: 2.7/km^{2} (7.1/sq mi)
  - Urban: 0%
  - Rural: 100%

Administrative structure
  - Administrative divisions: 11 rural okrug
  - Inhabited localities: 34 rural localities

Municipal structure
  - Municipally incorporated as: Kolosovsky Municipal District
  - Municipal divisions: 0 urban settlements, 11 rural settlements
- Time zone: UTC+6 (MSK+3)
- OKTMO ID: 52621000
- Website: http://kolos.omskportal.ru/

Kolosovsky District (Russian: Колосо́вский райо́н) is an administrative and municipal district (raion), one of the thirty-two in Omsk Oblast, Russia. It is located in the center of the oblast. The area of the district is 4,700 square kilometers (1,800 sq mi). Its administrative center is the rural locality (a selo) of Kolosovka. Population: 12,803 (2010 Census); 15,763 (2002 Census); 17,861 (1989 Soviet census). The population of Kolosovka accounts for 41.5% of the district's total population.
