= Bolsheukovsky District =

Bolsheukovsky District Большеуковский район (Russian)
- District
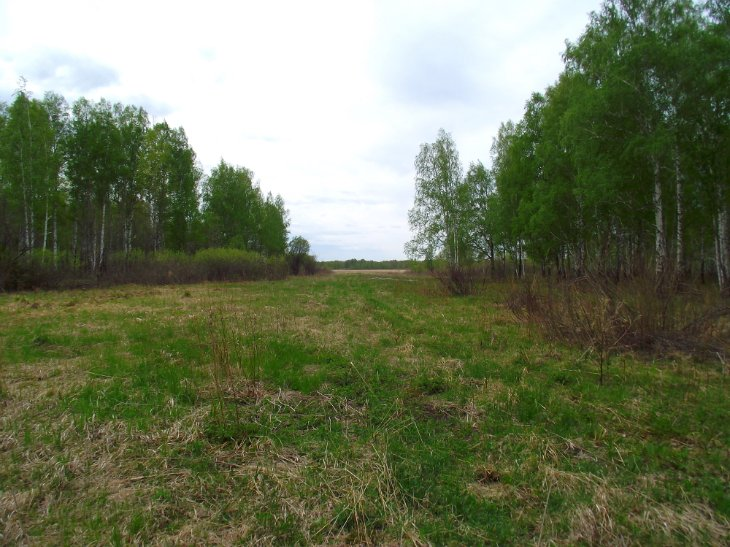
- Nature reserve in Bolsheukovsky District

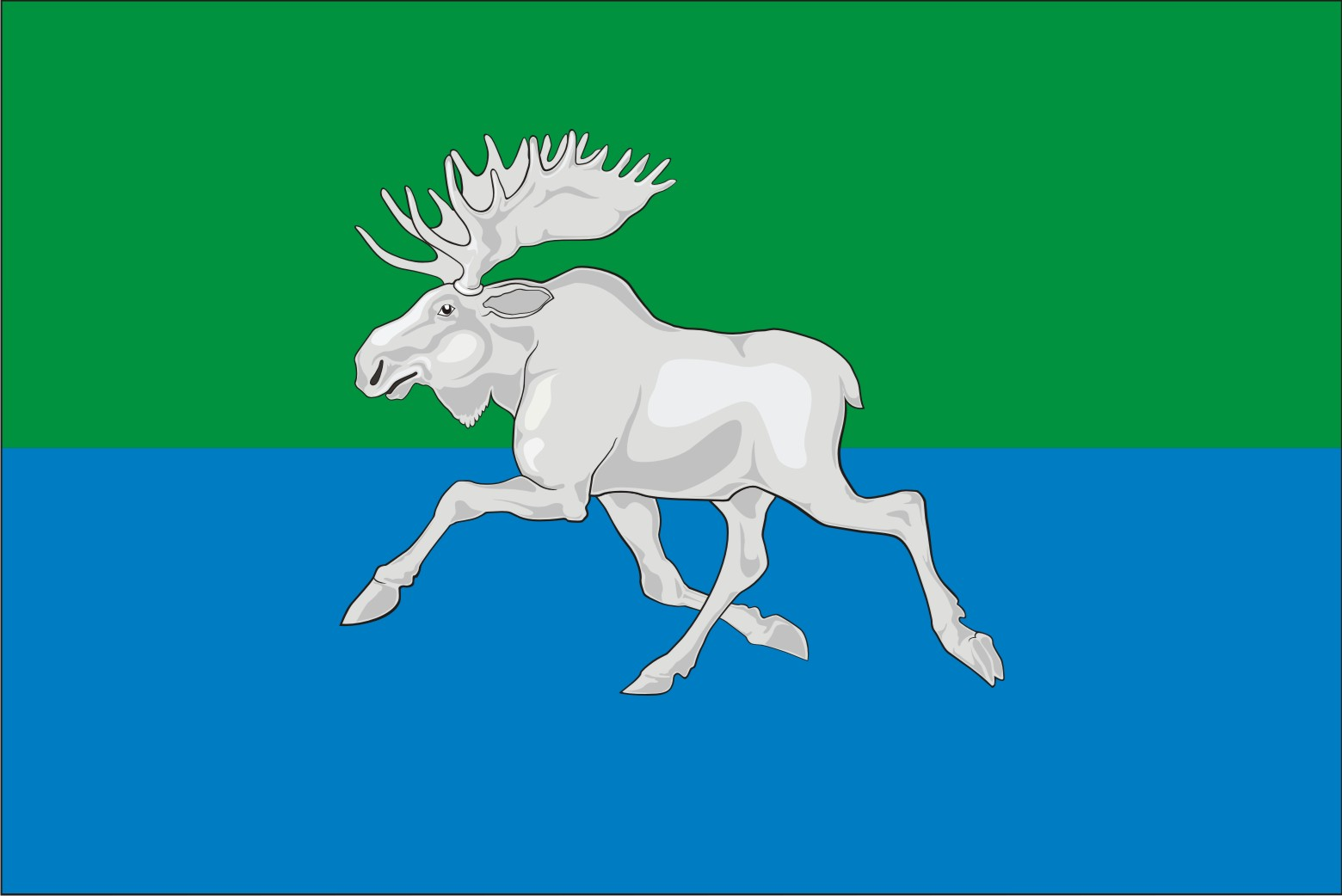
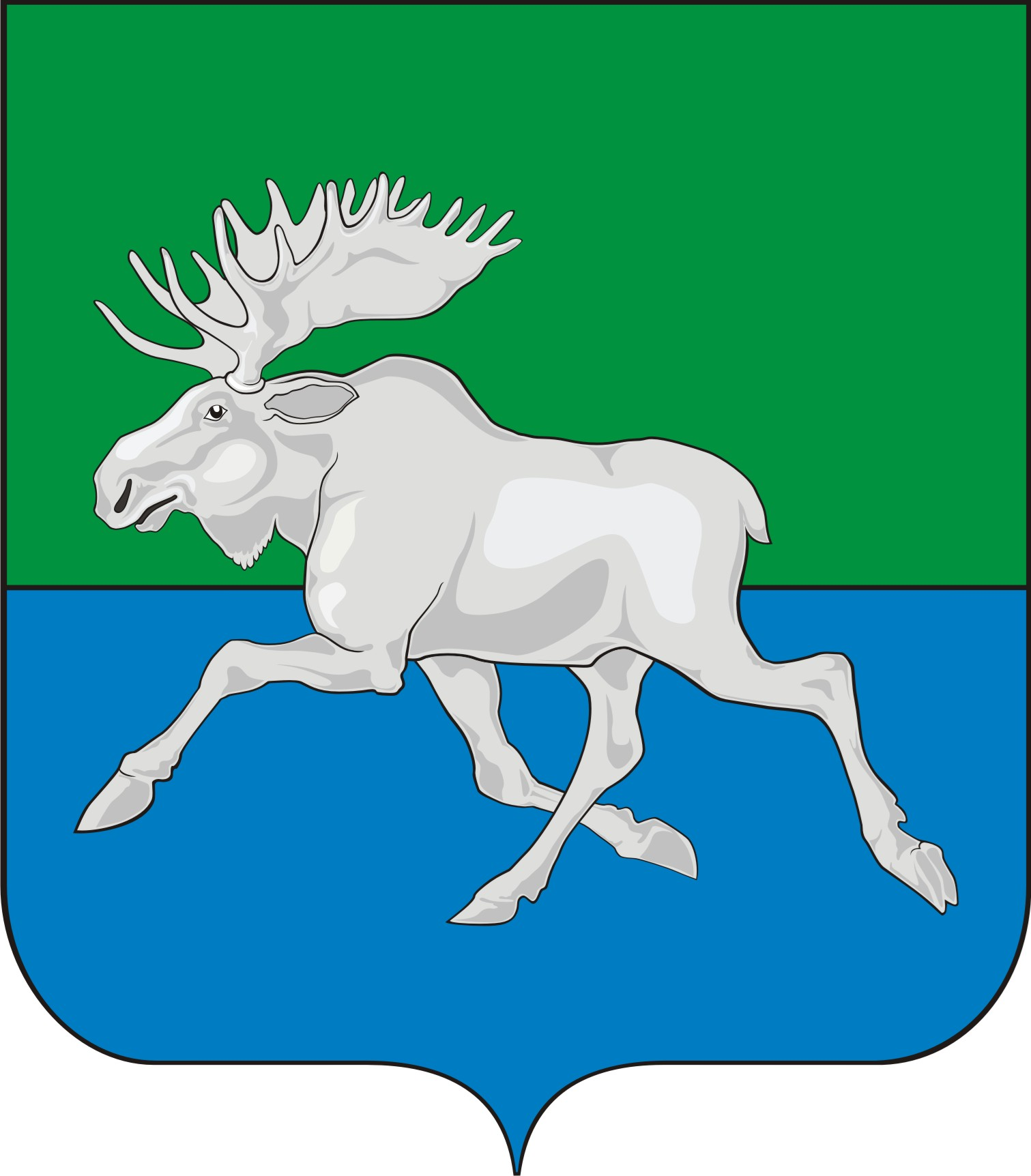
- Flag Coat of arms
- Location of Bolsheukovsky District in Omsk Oblast
- Coordinates: 56°56′N 72°40′E
- Country: Russia
- Federal subject: Omsk Oblast
- Administrative center: Bolshiye Uki

Area
  - Total: 9,500 km^{2} (3,700 sq mi)

Population (2010 Census)
  - Total: 8,174
  - Density: 0.86/km^{2} (2.2/sq mi)
  - Urban: 0%
  - Rural: 100%

Administrative structure
  - Administrative divisions: 9 rural okrug
  - Inhabited localities: 19 rural localities

Municipal structure
  - Municipally incorporated as: Bolsheukovsky Municipal District
  - Municipal divisions: 0 urban settlements, 9 rural settlements
- Time zone: UTC+6 (MSK+3)
- OKTMO ID: 52606000

Bolsheukovsky District (Russian: Большеуко́вский райо́н) is an administrative and municipal district (raion), one of the thirty-two in Omsk Oblast, Russia. It is located in the northwest of the oblast. The area of the district is 9,500 square kilometers (3,700 sq mi). Its administrative center is the rural locality (a selo) of Bolshiye Uki. Population: 8,174 (2010 Census); 9,707 (2002 census); 11,130 (1989 Soviet census). The population of Bolshiye Uki accounts for 50.9% of the district's total population.
