= Kormilovsky District =

Kormilovsky District Кормиловский район (Russian)
- District
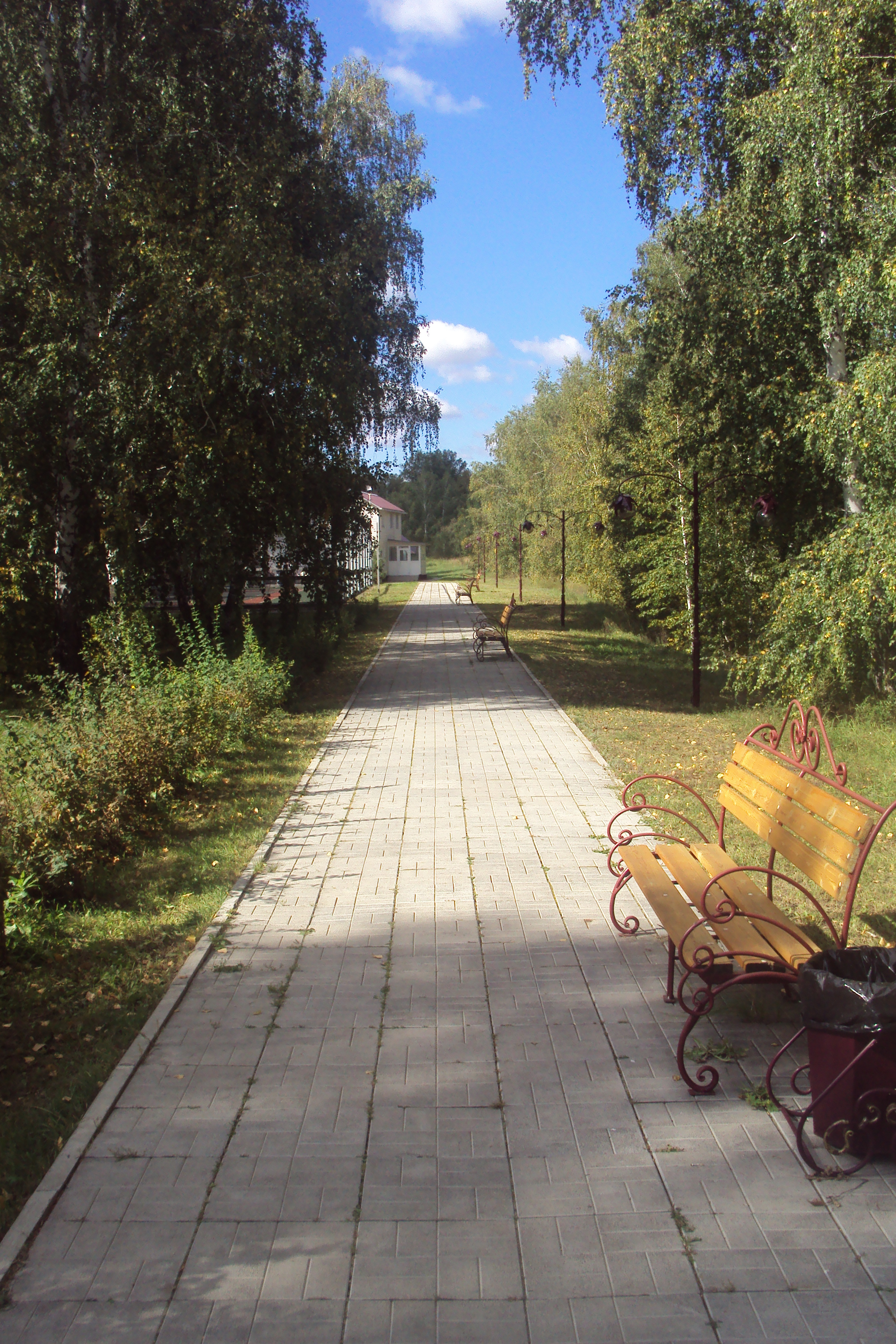
- Park in Kormilovsky District

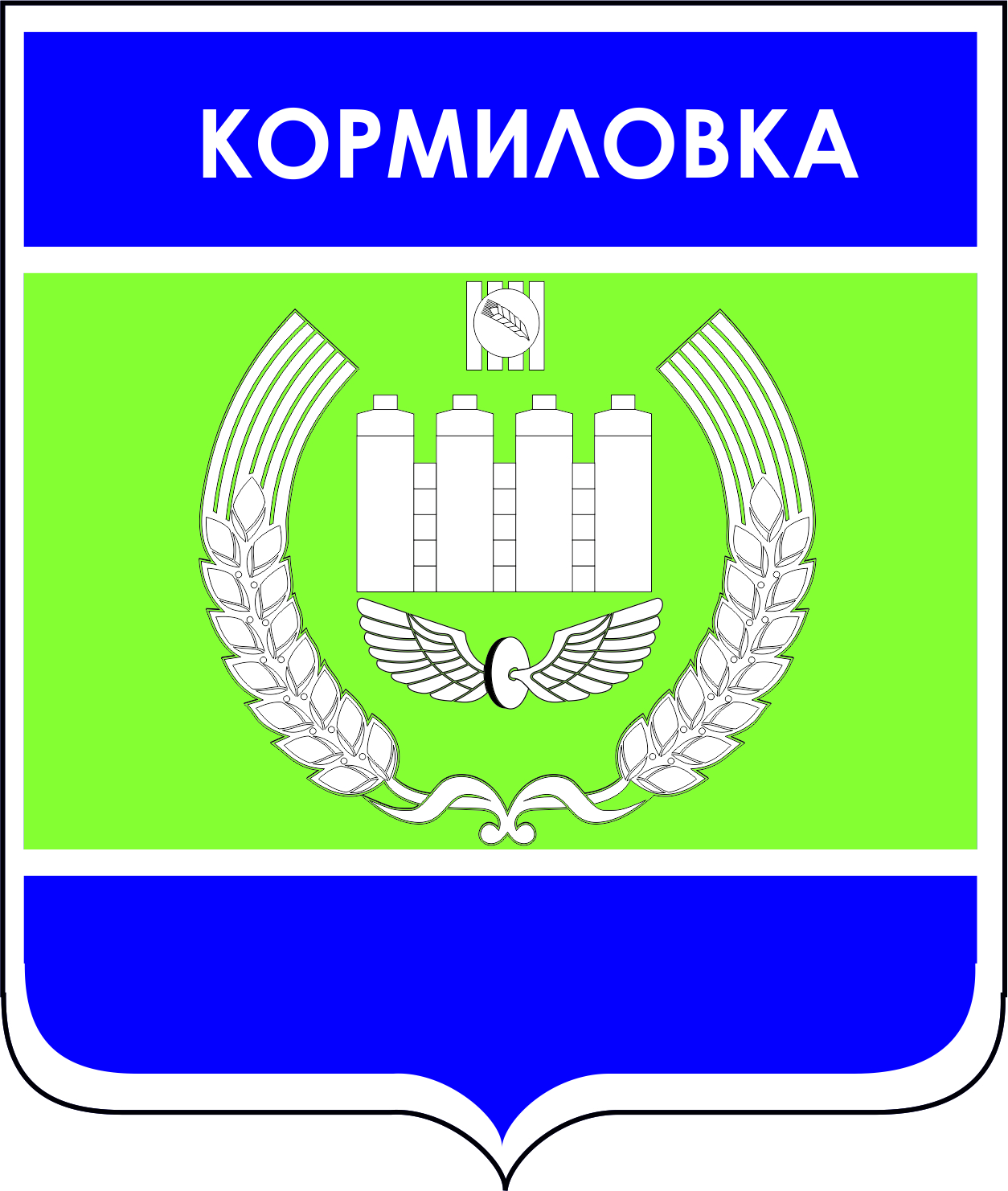
- Flag Coat of arms
- Location of Kormilovsky District in Omsk Oblast
- Coordinates: 54°59′57″N 74°04′55″E
- Country: Russia
- Federal subject: Omsk Oblast
- Established: 1935
- Administrative center: Kormilovka

Area
  - Total: 1,908.23 km^{2} (736.77 sq mi)

Population (2010 Census)
  - Total: 24,726
  - Density: 12.958/km^{2} (33.560/sq mi)
  - Urban: 38.9%
  - Rural: 61.1%

Administrative structure
  - Administrative divisions: 1 Work settlements, 10 Rural okrugs
  - Inhabited localities: 1 urban-type settlements, 41 rural localities

Municipal structure
  - Municipally incorporated as: Kormilovsky Municipal District
  - Municipal divisions: 1 urban settlements, 10 rural settlements
- Time zone: UTC+6 (MSK+3)
- OKTMO ID: 52623000
- Website: http://kormil.omskportal.ru/

Kormilovsky District (Russian: Корми́ловский райо́н) is an administrative and municipal district (raion), one of the thirty-two in Omsk Oblast, Russia. It is located in the southern central part of the oblast. The area of the district is 1,908.23 square kilometers (736.77 sq mi). Its administrative center is the urban locality (a work settlement) of Kormilovka. Population: 24,726 (2010 Census); 25,989 (2002 census); 26,319 (1989 Soviet census). The population of Kormilovka accounts for 38.9% of the district's total population.

== Towns and settlements ==
- 2nd Fominovka

== Notable residents ==
- Kristina Makarenko (born 1997 in Kormilovka), née Sivkova, sprinter
- Viktor Uan (born 1994), football player
