= Kalachinsky District =

Kalachinsky District Калачинский район (Russian)
- District
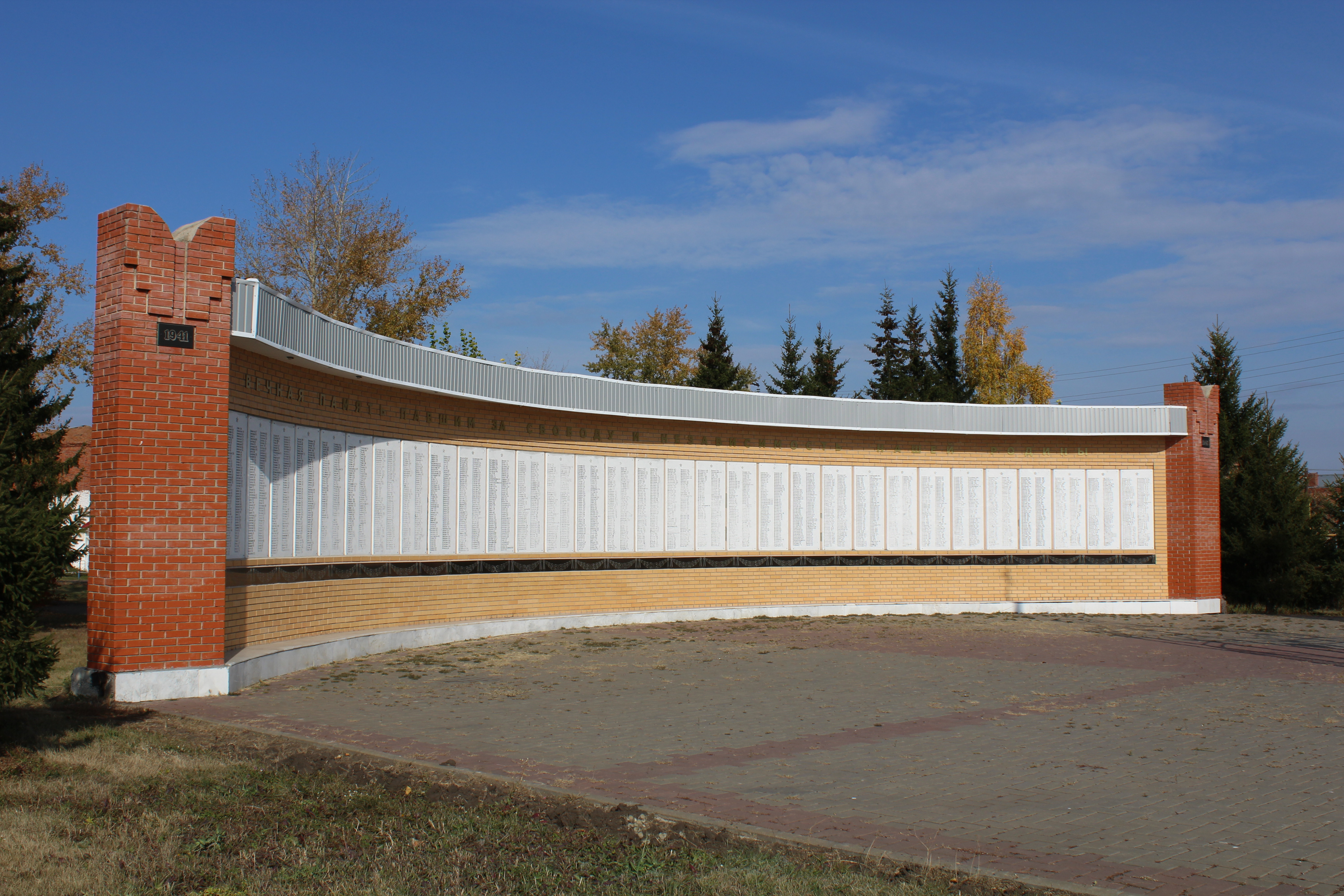
- Memorial wall in Kalachinsk

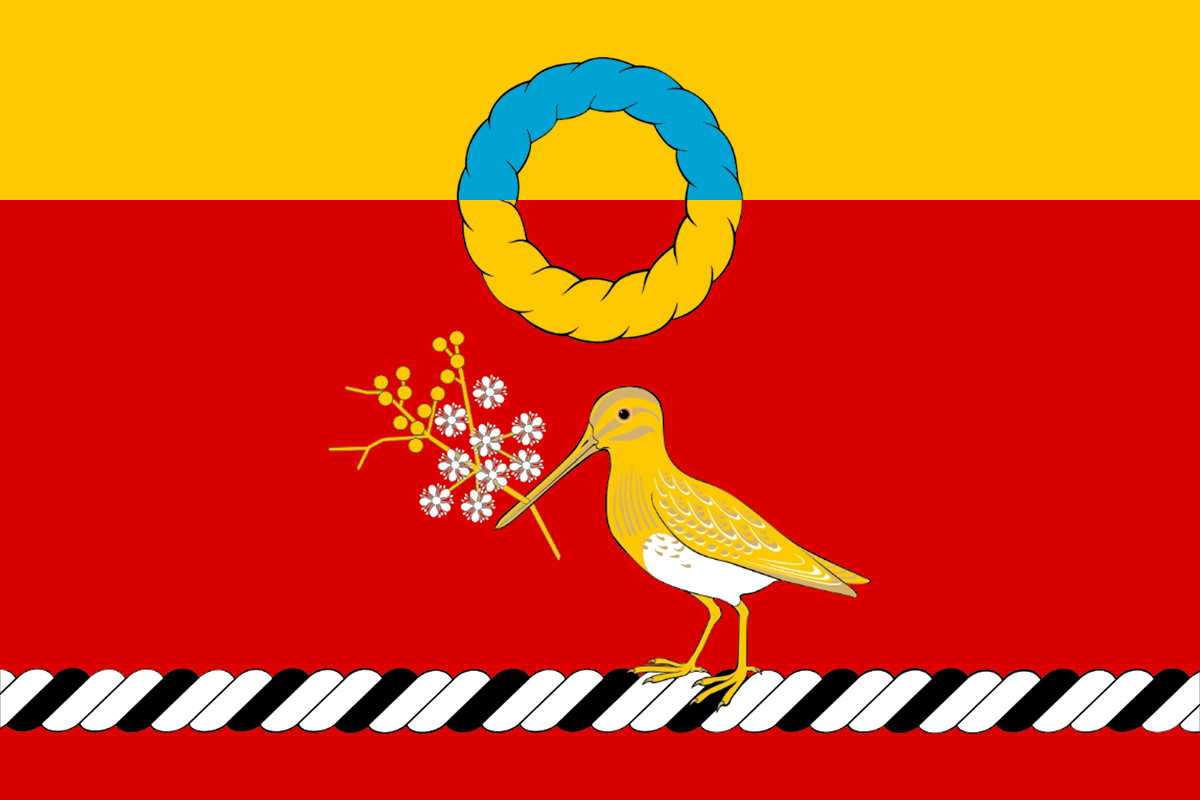
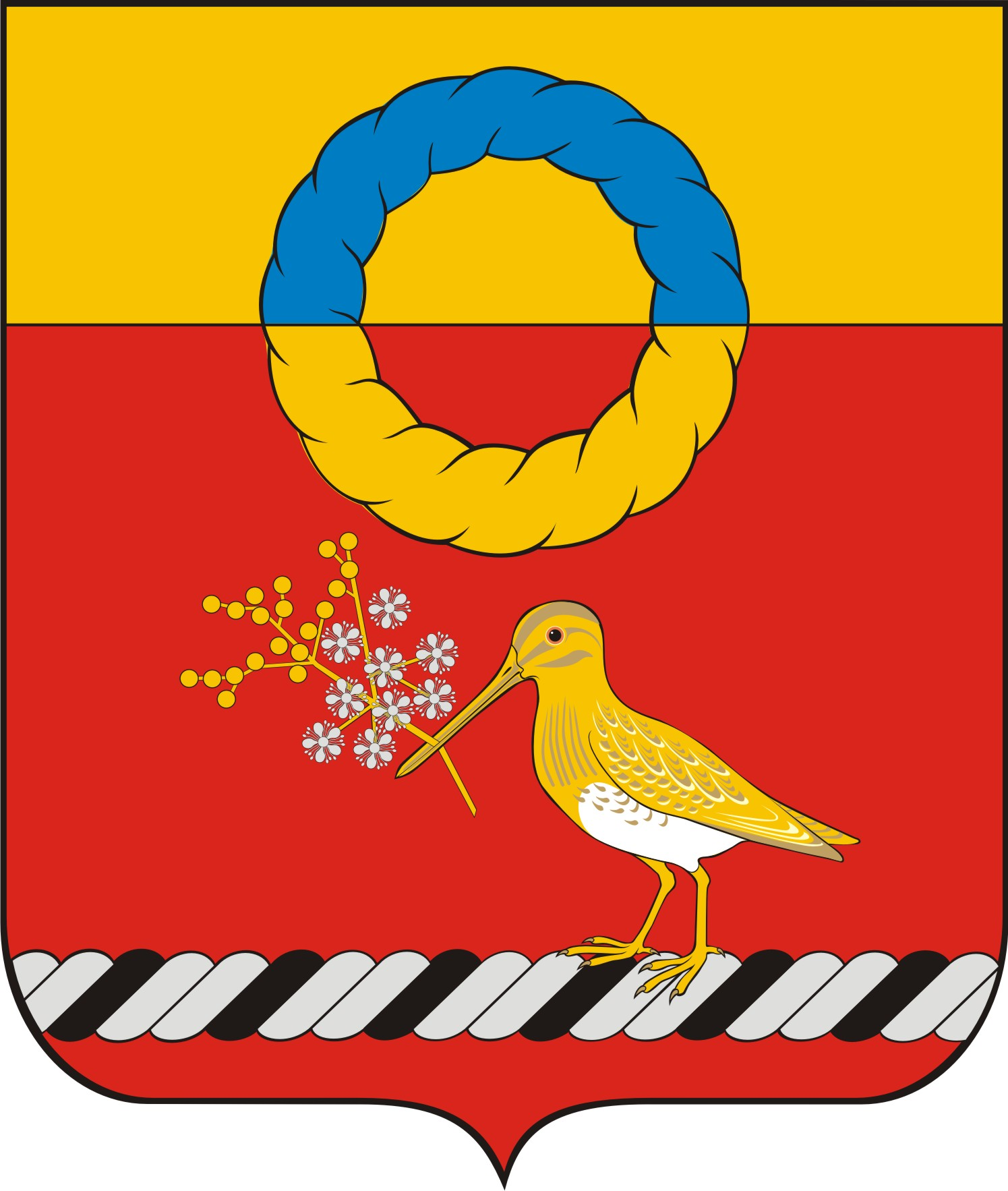
- Flag Coat of arms
- Location of Kalachinsky District on the map of Omsk Oblast
- Coordinates: 55°03′N 74°35′E
- Country: Russia
- Federal subject: Omsk Oblast
- Administrative center: Kalachinsk

Area
  - Total: 2,800 km^{2} (1,100 sq mi)

Population (2010 Census)
  - Total: 18,197
  - Density: 6.5/km^{2} (17/sq mi)
  - Urban: 0%
  - Rural: 100%

Administrative structure
  - Administrative divisions: 12 rural okrug
  - Inhabited localities: 54 rural localities

Municipal structure
  - Municipally incorporated as: Kalachinsky Municipal District
  - Municipal divisions: 1 urban settlements, 12 rural settlements
- Time zone: UTC+6 (MSK+3)
- OKTMO ID: 52618000
- Website: http://www.kalachinsk.ru/

Kalachinsky District (Russian: Калачинский райо́н) is an administrative and municipal district (raion), one of the thirty-two in Omsk Oblast, Russia. It is located in the southeast of the oblast. The area of the district is 2,800 square kilometers (1,100 sq mi). Its administrative center is the town of Kalachinsk (which is not administratively a part of the district). Population: 18,197 (2010 Census); 21,810 (2002 census); 22,812 (1989 Soviet census).

== Administrative and municipal status ==
Within the framework of administrative divisions, Kalachinsky District is one of the thirty-two in the oblast. The town of Kalachinsk serves as its administrative center, despite being incorporated separately as a town of oblast significance—an administrative unit with the status equal to that of the districts.

As a municipal division, the district is incorporated as Kalachinsky Municipal District, with the town of oblast significance of Kalachinsk being incorporated within it as Kalachinsk Urban Settlement.

== Notable residents ==
- Alexander Altunin (1921–1989), Soviet general and politician, born in the village of Steklyanka
