= Moskalensky District =

Moskalensky District Москаленский район (Russian)
- District
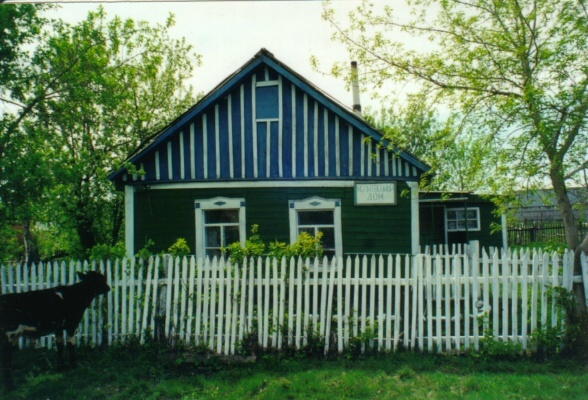
- House in Moskalensky District

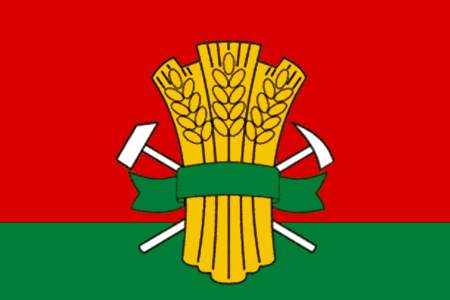
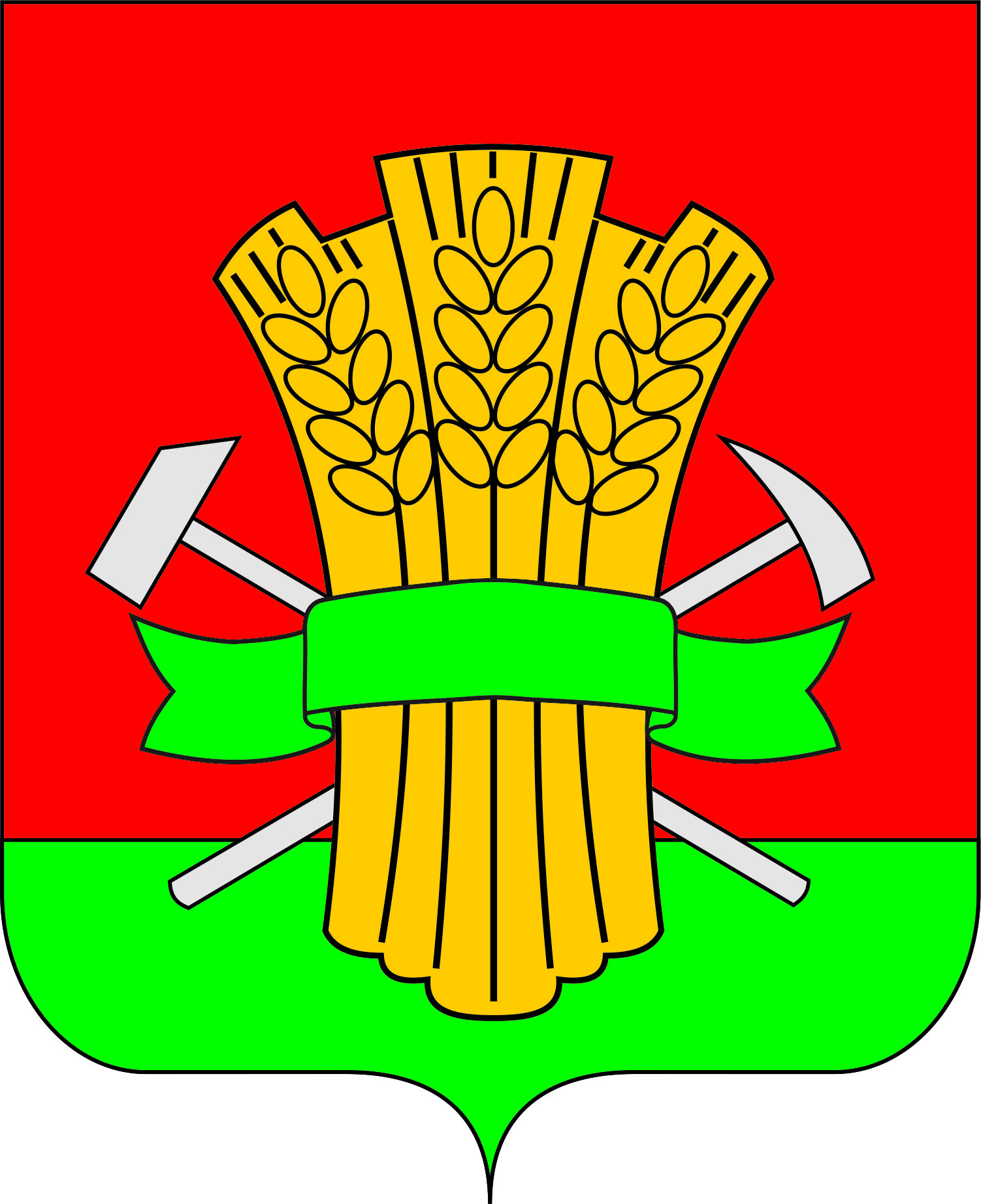
- Flag Coat of arms
- Location of Moskalensky District in Omsk Oblast
- Coordinates: 54°56′00″N 71°56′15″E
- Country: Russia
- Federal subject: Omsk Oblast
- Established: 1925
- Administrative center: Moskalenki

Area
  - Total: 2,500 km^{2} (970 sq mi)

Population (2010 Census)
  - Total: 28,968
  - Density: 12/km^{2} (30/sq mi)
  - Urban: 32.1%
  - Rural: 67.9%

Administrative structure
  - Administrative divisions: 1 Work settlements, 12 Rural okrugs
  - Inhabited localities: 1 urban-type settlements, 56 rural localities

Municipal structure
  - Municipally incorporated as: Moskalensky Municipal District
  - Municipal divisions: 1 urban settlements, 12 rural settlements
- Time zone: UTC+6 (MSK+3)
- OKTMO ID: 52632000
- Website: http://moskal.omskportal.ru/

Moskalensky District (Russian: Москале́нский райо́н) is an administrative and municipal district (raion), one of the thirty-two in Omsk Oblast, Russia. It is located in the southwest of the oblast. The area of the district is 2,500 square kilometers (970 sq mi). Its administrative center is the urban locality (a work settlement) of Moskalenki. Population: 28,968 (2010 Census); 32,053 (2002 census); 33,611 (1989 Soviet census). The population of Moskalenki accounts for 32.1% of the district's total population.
