= Omsk Oblast =

First-level administrative division of Russia

Omsk Oblast Омская область (Russian)
- Oblast
- Flag Coat of arms

- Coordinates: 56°13′N 73°16′E
- Country: Russia
- Federal district: Siberian
- Economic region: West Siberian
- Established: 7 December 1934
- Administrative center: Omsk

Government
  - Body: Legislative Assembly
  - Governor: Vitaliy Khotsenko

Area
  - Total: 141,140 km^{2} (54,490 sq mi)
  - Rank: 28th

Population (2021 census)
  - Total: 1,858,798
  - Estimate (2018): 1,960,081
  - Rank: 25th
  - Density: 13.170/km^{2} (34.110/sq mi)
  - Urban: 73.5%
  - Rural: 26.5%

GDP (nominal, 2024)
  - Total: ₽1.06 trillion (US$12.4 billion)
  - Per capita: ₽578,934 (US$6,793.33)
- Time zone: UTC+6 (MSK+3)
- ISO 3166 code: RU-OMS
- License plates: 55
- OKTMO ID: 52000000
- Official languages: Russian
- Website: http://www.omskportal.ru/

Omsk Oblast (Note: Russian: О́мская о́бласть, romanized: Omskaya oblastʹ) is a federal subject of Russia (an oblast), located in southwestern Siberia. The oblast has an area of 139,700 square kilometers (53,900 sq mi). Its population is 1,977,665 (2010 Census) with the majority, 1.12 million, living its primate city, Omsk, which is the administrative center and largest city.

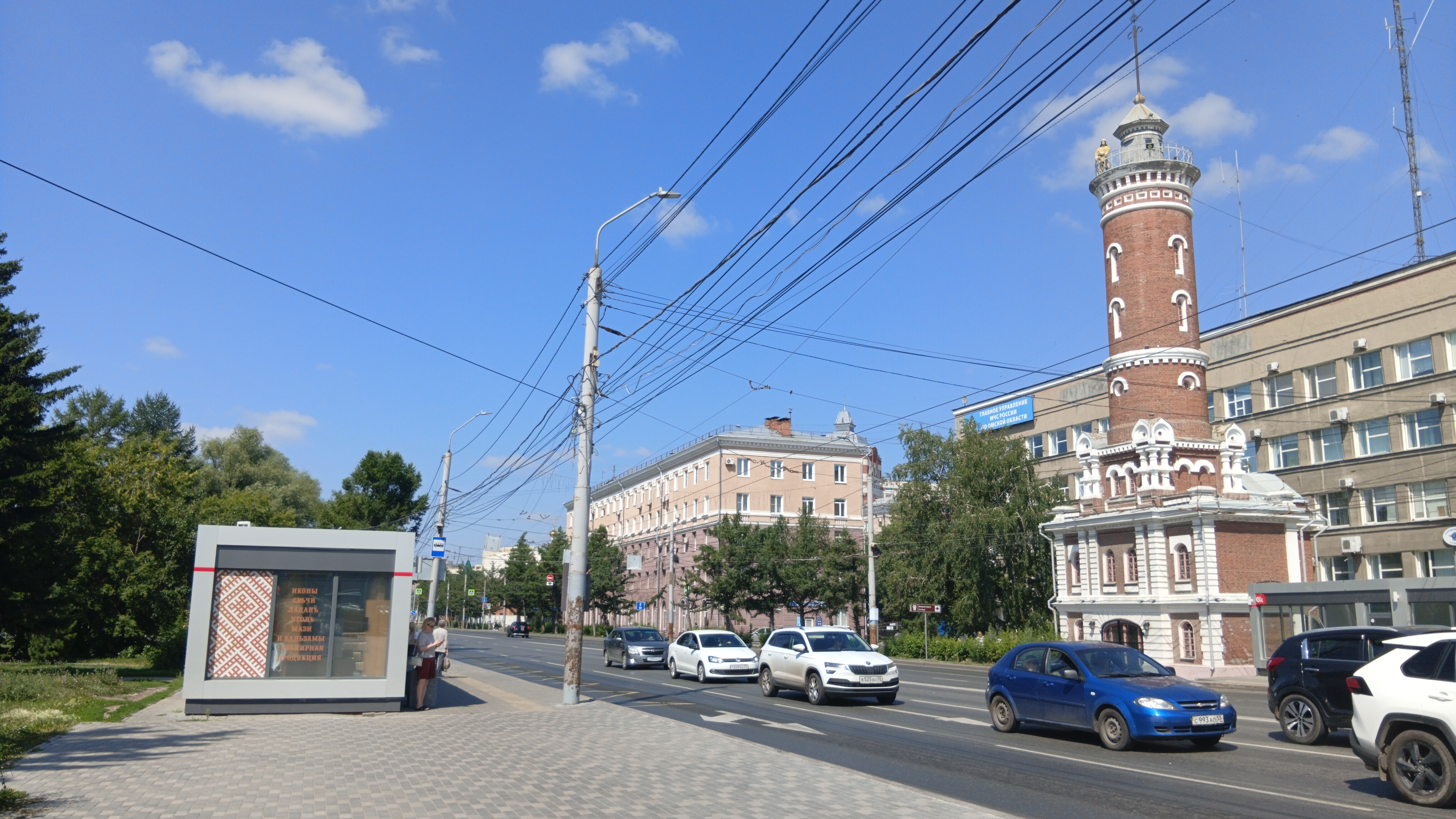
Omsk, the administrative center of Omsk oblast

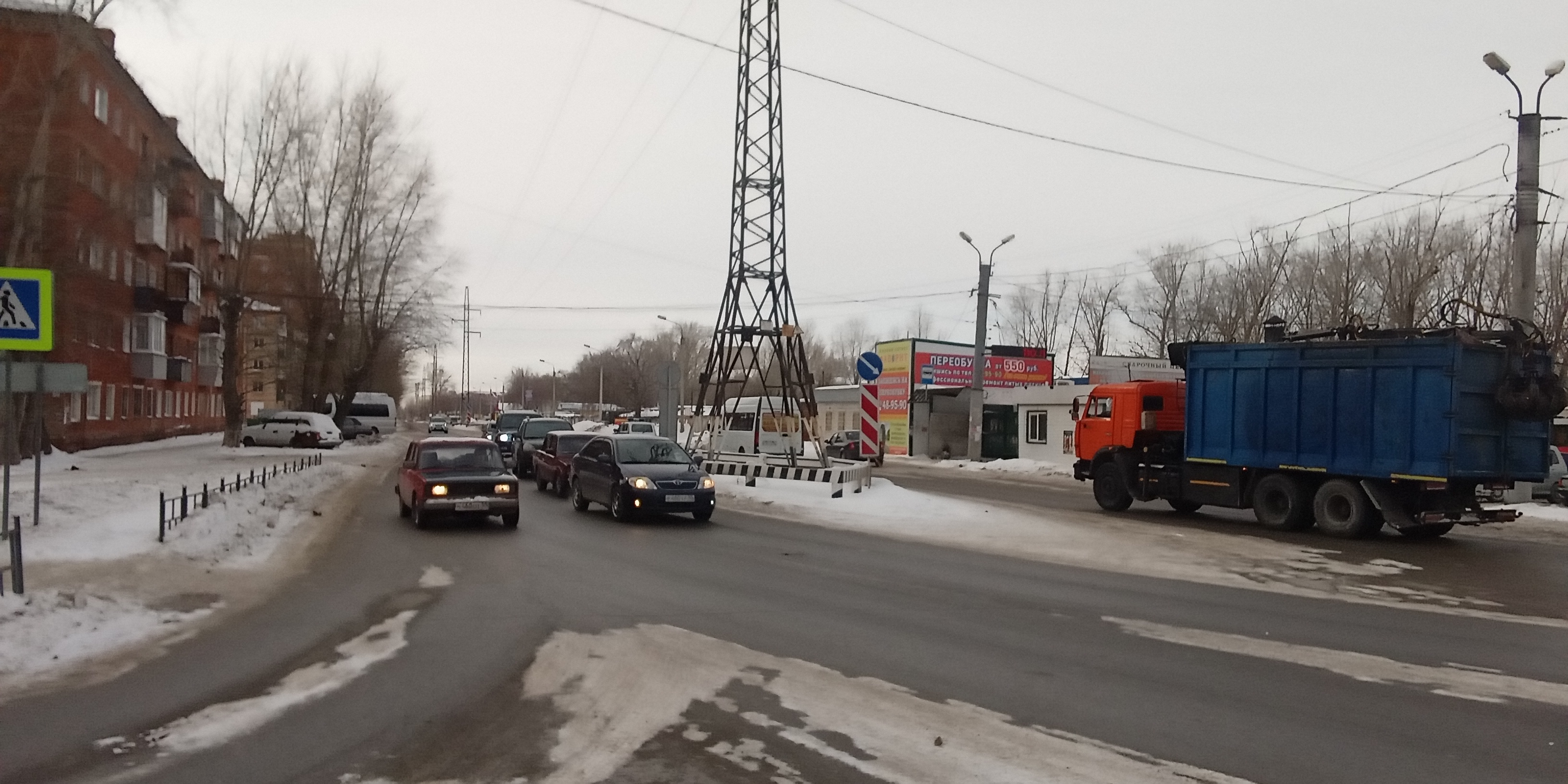
One of the Omsk streets

The oblast borders Tyumen Oblast in the north and west, Novosibirsk Oblast and Tomsk Oblast in the east, and Kazakhstan in the south.

== Geography ==
Omsk Oblast shares borders with Kazakhstan (North Kazakhstan Region and Pavlodar Region) to the south, Tyumen Oblast in the west and Novosibirsk Oblast and Tomsk Oblast in the east. It is included in the Siberian Federal District.

The territory stretches for 600 km (370 mi) from north to south and 300 km (190 mi) from west to east. The main water artery is the Irtysh River and its tributaries the Ishim, Om, Osha, and Tara Rivers. The region is located in the West Siberian Plain, consisting of mostly flat terrain. In the south is the Ishim Plain, gradually turning into steppe, forest and swampy taiga to the north. The soil is sandy and silty. Along the Irtysh River, in t. N. Irtysh region, there is an "oasis" microclimate, with a wooded landscape and gullies. There, the most fertile land in the region can be found. The Omsk region contains many lakes, the largest of which are Tenis-Saltaim, Ik, Ebeyty, Ulzhay and Tobol-Kushly.

The highest elevation in the Omsk region - about 150 m (490 ft) Upland village, the lowest elevation is the water's edge on the Irtysh - 41 metres (135 ft), near the village of Little Beach.

The property is located in Omsk region 28 specially protected natural territories of regional destinations. Including parks in Bolshereche and Omsk ("Bird's harbor").

=== Climate ===
The oblast has a classic continental climate, with cold, snowy winters and hot, dry summers. Average January temperatures range from −42 to −30 °C (−44 to −22 °F). Average July temperatures range from 25 to 28 °C (77 to 82 °F) and can reach up to 35 °C (95 °F) and even 40 °C (104 °F). Annual rainfall averages 300–400 mm (12–16 in). Sunny days predominate.

The southern plains have notably longer and warmer summers and a delayed onset of freezing temperatures. They are also significantly drier than the northern forests, receiving only 250–300 mm (9.8–11.8 in) precipitation annually. Winters, however, are as severe on the plains as they are further north. Spring rains are rare, but late spring freezes are not. The early part of the summer is frequently dominated by hot, dry southern winds.

=== Ecology ===
As of 1 February 2016, on the territory of the Omsk region, there are 35 areas that have the status of protected areas (PAs), regional and local importance.

== History ==
=== Prehistory and the Middle Ages ===
Archeological findings indicate that the present day territory of the oblast has been inhabited for the last 14,000 years. Neolithic societies in the area lived by fishing and hunting. About three thousand years ago, pastoralism began to take hold. Ust'-Ishim man, the remains of a man that lived 45,000 years ago, was discovered in Omsk Oblast.

Various Turkic states dominated the area throughout the Medieval era. The most notable of these were the Western Turkic Khaganate and the Siberian Khanate. Siberian Tatars, Mongols, Khanty and Mansi tribes, along with others, inhabited the territory.

=== Exploration of Siberia ===
The Russian history of Omsk began with the 1584 arrival of a Cossack force under the command of ataman Yermak Timofeyevich, who defeated local rulers and established nominal Russian control of the area. To support further expansion tsars Feodor I and Boris Godunov initiated the construction of fortified settlements and military outposts in the south of Siberia in order to defend their subjects from raiding nomadic tribesmen and to exert authority over local populations, specifically over the tribute-paying Siberian Tatars of The Baraba Lands. The first permanent Russian settlement in the region, the city of Tara, was founded in 1594, soon it began to play an important part in fur trade that connected Russia with Central Asia and China.

In 1716 a fortress was constructed at the confluence of the Om and Irtysh rivers on the orders of sublieutenant Ivan Bugholtz. The fortress would form the nucleus for the development of the future city of Omsk. By the second half of the 18th century, Omsk fortress was the largest building of any kind in the eastern part of Russia.

As Russian settlements continued to spread through the Yenisei, Tobol and Irtysh watersheds in the course of the 18th century, so did the development of the Omsk and the surrounding region. In 1753 a customs post was established to tax goods brought into the city by the ever-increasing trade with Kazakh tribesmen. In 1764, when the Siberian provinces of Russia were organized into two governorates with centers in Irkutsk and Tobolsk, the city of Tara and the fortress of Omsk were assigned to the latter. In 1780, on the orders of Catherine the Great the fortress was transferred to Kolyvan Oblast. By this time Omsk had grown to the size of a small city, however, from 1797 to 1804 it did not possess its own uyezd.

=== Russian Empire ===
In 1804, the territories surrounding Omsk were organized into the Omsk Okrug. The city rose to prominence when Siberia was once again reorganized in 1822, Omsk became the administrative center of the General Governorate of Eastern Siberia rising above the old center of Siberia, Tobolsk. The new governorate was divided into oblasts around the cities of Omsk, Petropavlovsk, Semipalatinsk and Ust-Kamenogrsk populated by Russian colonists and okrugs populated by Kazakh nomads. In subsequent reforms the name of the Oblast was changed repeatedly to The Oblast of The Siberian Kyrgyz (1854), Akmolinsk Oblast (1868), and Omsk Oblast (1917) before finally reverting to the Omsk Governorate in 1918. The authority of the oblast followed further expansion of the empire to Central Asia and included significant parts of modern-day Kazakhstan.

In the 19th century, Omsk, given its strong system of frontier fortresses, became notorious as a premier destination for political exiles and prisoners from the European part of the Russian Empire. Decembrists, Polish rebels, French prisoners of war and political activists of every stripe found their way to Siberia. Among them was Fyodor Dostoyevsky, who spent four years (1850–1854) at the Omsk prison.

The early nineteenth century also saw the growth of industry in the city and in the rest of the Irtysh basin. The Siberian Cossack Army was headquartered in Omsk after 1808 and contributed to the development of the city, by the beginning of the 20th century the Cossacks were a dominant component in the society of both the city of Omsk and the surrounding lands, having reached a population of 174 thousand and holding title to five million hectares of agricultural land. The 18th and 19th centuries also saw the influx of a significant number of German immigrants both from Russia's Volga Regions and from abroad.

=== Soviet years ===
In 1925 the Omsk governorate was dissolved into the newly formed Siberian Krai and again reorganized, this time as an Oblast by order of the All-Russian Central Executive Committee on 7 December 1934. Parts of the Ob-Irtysh Oblast and the West Siberian Krai as well as the southern part of Chelyabinsk Oblast were given over to Omsk. In 1943, Kurgan Oblast created from the western portion of the Chelyabinsk Oblast also got a number of Omsk territories. In 1944, the northern part of the Omsk Oblast along with the districts previously transferred to Kurgan became newly established Tyumen Oblast that included Khanty-Mansi and Yamalo-Nenets autonomous okrugs.

The 1950s saw the creation of the petroleum processing industry, as well as the development of various high-technology facilities that came to define the economy of the Oblast for the remainder of the century.

=== Post-Soviet era ===
With the dissolution of the Soviet Union the oblast became part of the newly independent Russian Federation. The independence of Kazakhstan gave Omsk an international border to the south, while continued federal policy aiming to rectify the effects of Stalin era population transfers led to the creation of a national German district in an area with a significant, although not a majority, German population around the town of Azovo. On 19 May 1996 Omsk Oblast signed a power-sharing agreement with the federal government, granting it autonomy. This agreement would be abolished on 21 December 2001.

== Politics ==
During the Soviet period, the high authority in the oblast was shared between three persons: The first secretary of the Omsk CPSU Committee (who in reality had the biggest authority), the chairman of the oblast Soviet (legislative power), and the chairman of the oblast Executive Committee (executive power). Since 1991, CPSU lost all the power, and the head of the Oblast administration, and eventually the governor was appointed/elected alongside elected regional parliament.

The politics in the oblast is governed by the Charter of Omsk Oblast. The laws within the authority of the oblast are passed by the Legislative Assembly of Omsk Oblast which is the legislative (representative) body. The highest executive body is the Omsk Oblast Administration. It also includes the executive bodies of the subdivisions such as districts, and is responsible for the daily administration. The Oblast administration supports the activities of the Governor who is the head of the oblast and acts as guarantor of the observance of the Charter in accordance with the Constitution of Russia.

As of 18 January 2019, the departmental register of registered non-profit organizations of the Office of the Ministry of Justice of the Russian Federation for the Omsk Oblast contains information on 2537 non-profit organizations, including 1332 public associations (national associations - 60, regional branches of political parties - 46, trade unions - 328, children's and youth public associations - 55), 308 religious organizations, 30 Cossack societies, and 20 public associations of Cossacks. For example, in the Omsk Oblast there are regional branches of the political parties United Russia, A Just Russia, the Communist Party of the Russian Federation, and others.

== Economy ==
As of 2008, Omsk Oblast is the 23rd largest economy in Russia, with a gross regional product of 10.2 billion dollars.

The economy of Omsk Oblast is heavily industrial, with well developed, and growing, service and financial sectors. Agriculture represents a smaller, but still significant, portion of the economy.

Economic activity is concentrated in Omsk, with over sixty-six thousand private enterprises registered, ranging from small-scale retailers to billion-dollar manufacturing.

Omsk was ranked by Forbes as the 6th-best city in Russia for business in 2008, an improvement over its 20th-place ranking the previous year.

The oblast and city governments have made efforts to improve the business climate and foster small enterprise through various incentives and government programs designed to ease the bureaucratic red-tape, a notorious feature of Russian business life, and to generate cooperation within the business community.

The bulk of industrial output, as of 2009, is concentrated in food and tobacco processing ($900 million), hydrocarbon processing ($6.7 billion), chemical manufacturing ($500 m), plastics manufacturing ($200 m) and the manufacture of electrical components ($280 m). The remainder of the economy is dominated by the retail sector and agriculture.

The largest industrial enterprises include the aerospace manufacturer Polyot, the Omsk Aggregate Plant, the agricultural manufacturer Sibzavod, Omsk Baranov Motorworks, and Omsktransmash, which manufactures the T-80 main battle tank. Additionally, Omsk Rubber, the Technical Hydrocarbon Plant, Omsk-Polymer and Omsk Hydrocarbon Processing Plant, represent the petroleum and hydrocarbon industry. Omsk Hydrocarbon is one of the most important oil refineries in Russia.

The oblast operates four thermal power plants, which makes it largely self-sufficient from the standpoint of energy generation.

Agricultural production is concentrated in the Isil'rul'skii District and produces wheat, barley, flax, sunflower, potato, various fruits and vegetables as well as meat, poultry and dairy products.

The food processing sector includes several breweries, a distillery and numerous food packaging enterprises.

== Demographics ==
Historical population
Year	Pop.	±%
1926	2,075,967	—
1937	2,330,420	+12.3%
1959	1,645,017	−29.4%
1970	1,823,831	+10.9%
1979	1,954,663	+7.2%
1989	2,140,336	+9.5%
2002	2,079,220	−2.9%
2010	1,977,665	−4.9%
2021	1,858,798	−6.0%
Source: Census data

Population: 1,858,798 (2021 census); 1,977,665 (2010 census); 2,079,220 (2002 census); 2,140,336 (1989 Soviet census).

Vital statistics for 2024:

- Births: 14,046 (7.7 per 1,000)
- Deaths: 24,790 (13.7 per 1,000)

Total fertility rate (2024):
1.43 children per woman

Life expectancy (2021):
Total — 69.02 years (male — 64.48, female — 73.45)

According to the 2010 Census, the ethnic composition was:

- 85.8% Russian
- 4.1% Kazakh
- 2.7% Ukrainian
- 2.6% German
- 2.2% Volga-Ural-Siberian Tatars
- 0.4% Armenian
- 0.3% Belarusians
- other groups of less than five thousand persons each
- 57,518 people were registered from administrative databases, and could not declare an ethnicity. It is estimated that the proportion of ethnicities in this group is the same as that of the declared group.

According to Russia's 2002 Census, Omsk Oblast has one of the lowest birth rates in Siberia. However, birth rates remain higher than the average in heavily German districts - Azovsky Nemetsky National District (24% German), Moskalensky, Poltavsky (22% Ukrainian & 11% German) and Isilkulsky (8% German), even as significant emigration to Germany acts to reduce the overall birth rate. In 2009, the lowest death rate was recorded for Azovsky German National Raion (9.4 per 1000) and the highest birth rate was recorded for Moskalenskom (17.0 per 1000), Isilkulskom (15.2), Maryanovsky (15.8), Pavlogradski (15.8), Tevrizskom (16.6), Ust-Ishim (15.4) and Sherbakulskom (16.2). Regions with the highest population growth were Moskalensky area (5.5 ppm), Azovsky German National Raion (4.8 ppm), Sherbakulsky (3.8 ppm) and Pavlogradskij (3.2 ppm). More than 60 per cent or 1.1 million of the oblast's population of 1.8 million lives in Omsk.

Raion (2007)	Pop	Births	Deaths	NG	BR	DR	NGR
Omsk Oblast	2,020,000	23,627	29,578	-5,951	11.7	14.6	-0.29%
Omsk	1,130,000	11,857	15,599	-3,742	10.5	13.8	-0.33%
Azovsky Nemetsky National District	22,500	327	245	82	14.5	10.9	0.36%
Bolsherechensky District	32,400	393	519	-126	12.1	16	-0.39%
Bolsheukovsky District	8,800	125	160	-35	14.2	18.1	-0.39%
Gorkovsky	23,400	295	366	-71	12.6	15.7	-0.31%
Znamensky	13,400	195	213	-18	14.6	15.9	-0.13%
Isilkulsky	46,700	681	715	-34	14.6	15.3	-0.07%
Kalachinsky	44,700	506	754	-248	11.3	16.9	-0.56%
Kolosovsky	14,900	184	240	-56	12.4	16.1	-0.37%
Kormilovsky	25,800	352	447	-95	13.6	17.3	-0.37%
Krutinsky	20,000	248	343	-95	12.4	17.1	-0.47%
Lyubinsky	41,900	590	750	-160	14.1	17.9	-0.38%
Maryanovsky	27,300	423	444	-21	15.5	16.3	-0.08%
Moskalensky	32,200	505	460	45	15.7	14.3	0.14%
Muromtsevsky	26,100	271	542	-271	10.4	20.8	-1.04%
Nazyvayevsky	28,500	350	465	-115	12.3	16.3	-0.40%
Nizhneomsky	18,600	247	277	-30	13.3	14.9	-0.16%
Novovarshavsky	26,700	336	325	11	12.6	12.2	0.04%
Odessky	18,200	260	231	29	14.3	12.7	0.16%
Okoneshnikovsky	16,700	194	247	-53	11.6	14.8	-0.32%
Omsky	91,800	1,146	1,326	-180	12.5	14.4	-0.19%
Pavlogradsky	20,600	292	292	0	14.2	14.2	0.00%
Poltavsky	24,000	328	320	8	13.7	13.3	0.04%
Russko-Polyansky	22,800	314	344	-30	13.7	15.1	-0.14%
Sargatsky	21,800	279	364	-85	12.8	16.7	-0.39%
Sedelnikovsky	11,900	153	205	-52	12.9	17.3	-0.44%
Tavrichesky	39,200	519	579	-60	13.2	14.8	-0.16%
Tarsky	48,000	585	839	-254	12.2	17.5	-0.53%
Tevrizsky	17,200	270	305	-35	15.6	17.7	-0.21%
Tyukalinsky	29,500	357	472	-115	12.1	16	-0.39%
Ust-Ishimsky	15,200	192	289	-97	12.6	18.9	-0.63%
Cherlaksky	34,700	506	562	-56	14.6	16.2	-0.16%
Sherbakulsky	24,500	347	339	8	14.2	13.8	0.04%

Ethnic Russian birth rate in the province is significantly lower than that of the ethnic Kazakhs (by 50%) and that of ethnic Germans (by 20%), according to the 2002 Census.

=== Religion ===
Religion in Omsk Oblast as of 2012 (Sreda Arena Atlas)
Russian Orthodoxy	35.7%
Catholic	0.5%
Other Christians	3.3%
Islam	2.7%
Rodnovery and other native faiths	0.6%
Spiritual but not religious	39.1%
Atheism and irreligion	13%
Other and undeclared	5.1%

According to a 2012 survey 35.7% of the population of Omsk Oblast adheres to the Russian Orthodox Church, 3% are unaffiliated generic Christians, 2% adheres to Islam, 1% to the Slavic native faith (Rodnovery), 0.5% to the Catholic Church. In addition, 39% of the population declares to be "spiritual but not religious", 13% is atheist, and 5.8% follows other religions or did not give an answer to the question.

== Notable people ==
- John Kornievsky (1910–1984), Russian Greek Catholic priest

== Sister relationships ==
- Pest County, Hungary

== See also ==
- 2007 Siberian orange snow
- List of Chairmen of the Legislative Assembly of Omsk Oblast
- List of rural localities in Omsk Oblast
- Омская область
