= 2023 Omsk Oblast gubernatorial election =

- 9–10 September 2023
- Turnout: 34.50%
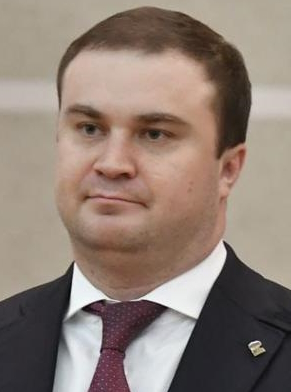

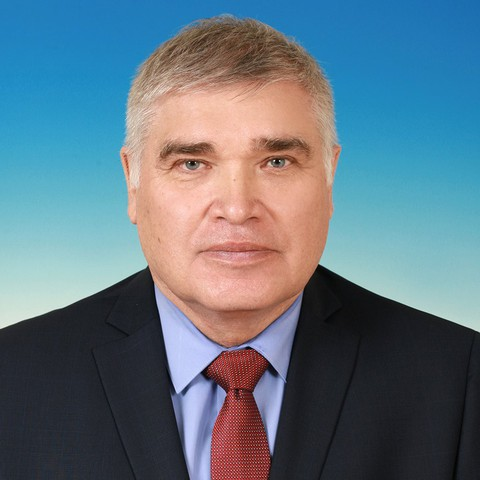
			CPCR
Candidate	Vitaliy Khotsenko	Andrey Alekhin	Vladimir Kazanin
Party	United Russia	CPRF	Communists of Russia
Popular vote	389,634	55,128	31,142
Percentage	76.33%	10.80%	6.20%
Governor before election
Vitaliy Khotsenko (acting)
United Russia
Governor-elect
Vitaliy Khostenko
United Russia

The 2023 Omsk Oblast gubernatorial election took place on 9–10 September 2023, on common election day. Acting Governor Vitaliy Khotsenko was elected for a full term.

== Background ==
State Duma member Alexander Burkov, a prominent politician from Sverdlovsk Oblast, was appointed acting Governor of Omsk Oblast in October 2017, replacing two-term Governor Viktor Nazarov. Burkov became the first A Just Russia governor since Konstantin Ilkovsky's resignation in Zabaykalsky Krai in early 2016 and the only governor from the party until Oleg Nikolayev's appointment as Head of Chuvashia in January 2020. Burkov ran for a full term in September 2018 as an independent, endorsed by A Just Russia, United Russia and CPRF, and overwhelmingly won the election with 82.6% of the vote.

Despite generally conventional term in office, Burkov faced criticism for personnel recruitment, notably, two regional health ministers were fired over the course of 2020 due to poor COVID-19 response, one of them, Irina Soldatova, was later arrested for abuse of power. During 2022–2023 several other prominent officials were sacked, including construction minister Mikhail Gubin (for breach of trust) and education minister Tatyana Dernova (for failure to meet school construction deadlines). Governor Burkov also clashed with fellow former A Just Russia State Duma member Aleksandr Chetverikov, a prominent agribusinessman who started several projects in Omsk Oblast with Burkov's support. Burkov accused Chetverikov of embezzlement in early 2021, which led to criminal case against the businessman. United Russia ratings in the region also consistently slipped, as the party narrowly won 32.90% of the vote, while CPRF placed second with 31.19%. Communist candidates Andrey Alekhin and Oleg Smolin also won in Omsk and Moskalenki constituencies, respectively, while United Russia candidate Oksana Fadina, Mayor of Omsk, won in Lyubinsky constituency.

On 29 March 2023 Aleksandr Burkov asked for resignation from the governor's post, President Vladimir Putin approved the request and appointed Prime Minister of Donetsk People's Republic Vitaliy Khotsenko as acting Governor of Omsk Oblast. Other candidates were also rumoured to be considered as Burkov's replacements, namely, United Russia State Duma member Igor Antropenko and Communist Deputy Presidential Envoy to the Siberian Federal District Oleg Denisenko. Khotsenko, a so-called "school of governors" graduate, became the second government official with prior Donbass executive experience to be appointed governor (the first was Vladislav Kuznetsov, appointed acting Governor of Chukotka Autonomous Okrug two weeks earlier).

== Candidates ==
In Omsk Oblast candidates for Governor can be nominated by registered political parties or by self-nomination. Candidate for Governor of Omsk Oblast should be a Russian citizen and at least 30 years old. Candidates for Governor should not have a foreign citizenship or residence permit. Each candidate in order to be registered is required to collect at least 5% of signatures of members and heads of municipalities. In addition, self-nominated candidates should collect 0.5% of signatures of Omsk Oblast residents (around 7,500 signatures). Also gubernatorial candidates present 3 candidacies to the Federation Council and election winner later appoints one of the presented candidates.

=== Registered ===
- Andrey Alekhin (CPRF), Member of State Duma (2021–present)
- Vladimir Kazanin (Communists of Russia), Member of Legislative Assembly of Omsk Oblast (2021–present)
- Vitaliy Khotsenko (United Russia), acting Governor of Omsk Oblast (2023–present), former Prime Minister of Donetsk People's Republic (2022–2023)
- Maksim Makalenko (LDPR), aide to State Duma member Sergey Karginov

=== Did not file ===
- Yury Aleksandrov (Independent), private security company owner
- Dmitry Gudz (Independent), IT engineer
- Sergey Skripal (Independent), electrician

=== Withdrawn ===
- Vadim Cherkin (Independent), unemployed

=== Declined ===
- Igor Basov, public activist
- Anton Berendeyev (LDPR), Member of Legislative Assembly of Omsk Oblast (2016–present)
- Aleksey Klepikov (LDPR), former Member of Legislative Assembly of Omsk Oblast (2011–2016)
- Aleksey Lozhkin (LDPR), former Member of Omsk City Council (2012–2022), 2018 gubernatorial candidate
- Aleksey Maksimenko (LDPR), Member of Council of Vasilyevskoe of Maryanovsky District (2020–present)
- Konstantin Tkachev (CPRF), Member of Legislative Assembly of Omsk Oblast (2016–present)

=== Candidates for Federation Council ===
Incumbent Senator Yelena Mizulina (Independent) was not renominated.

- Vitaliy Khotsenko (United Russia):
  - Vadim Berezhnoy, Member of Legislative Assembly of Omsk Oblast (2011–present), surgeon
  - Yulia Chekhlova, middle school teacher
  - Ivan Yevstifeyev, Deputy Head of Administration of Sirius (2022–present)

== Finances ==
All sums are in rubles.

Financial Report	Source	Alekhin	Aleksandrov	Cherkin	Gudz	Kazanin	Khotsenko	Makalenko
First		100,000	100,000	15,050	0	100,000	870,000	91,000
Final		1,967,700	100,000	15,050	0	3,311,597	48,260,224	2,471,000

== Polls ==
Fieldwork date	Polling firm	Khotsneko	Alyokhin	Makalenko	Kazanin	None	Lead
25 July – 10 August 2023	FOM	72%	15%	8%	4%	<1%	57%

== Results ==
Summary of the 9–10 September 2023 Omsk Oblast gubernatorial election results
Candidate	Party	Votes	%
Vitaliy Khotsenko (incumbent)	United Russia	389,634	76.33
Andrey Alekhin	Communist Party	55,128	10.80
Vladimir Kazanin	Communists of Russia	31,142	6.10
Maksim Makalenko	Liberal Democratic Party	23,864	4.68
Valid votes		499,768	97.91
Blank ballots		10,671	2.09
Total		510,439	100.00
Turnout		510,439	34.50
Registered voters		1,479,390	100.00

Governor Khotsenko appointed Sirius deputy head Ivan Yevstifeyev (United Russia) to the Federation Council, replacing retiring incumbent Senator Yelena Mizulina (Independent).

== See also ==
- 2023 Russian regional elections
