= Central constituency (Omsk Oblast) =

Russian legislative constituency

Central single-member constituency
- Constituency of the Russian State Duma
- Deputy: None
- Federal subject: Omsk Oblast
- Districts: Omsk (Oktyabrsky, Sovetsky, Tsentralny)
- Voters: 562,085 (2003)

The Central constituency (No.130) was a Russian legislative constituency in Omsk Oblast in 1993–2007. It covered most of Omsk. The seat was last occupied by United Russia faction member Aleksandr Kharitonov, a former Chief of the Omsk Academy of the Ministry of Internal Affairs, who won an open-seat race in the 2003 election.

The constituency was dissolved in 2007 when State Duma adopted full proportional representation for the next two electoral cycles. Central constituency was not re-established for the 2016 election, currently its territory is split between all three Omsk Oblast constituencies: Omsk, Moskalenki and Lyubinsky.

== Boundaries ==
1993–1995: Omsk (Kuybyshevsky, Oktyabrsky, Pervomaysky, Sovetsky, Tsentralny)
The constituency covered was fully contained within Omsk and covered most of the city (five out of then-seven districts). It was fully surrounded by Omsk constituency

1995–2003: Omsk (Kirovsky, Pervomaysky, Sovetsky, Tsentralny)
After 1995 redistricting the constituency swapped Kuybyshevsky and Oktyabrsky city districts with Kirovsky city district from the Omsk constituency. It remained fully surrounded by Omsk constituency.

2003–2007: Omsk (Oktyabrsky, Sovetsky, Tsentralny)
Following the redistricting the constituency again returned Kirovsky city district to Omsk constituency, gained Oktyabrsky city district back as well as the territory of former Kuybyshevsky city district, which was merged with Tsentralny district in 1997. The seat remained fully surrounded by Omsk constituency.

== Members elected ==
Election	Member	Party
1993	Sergey Baburin	Independent
1995	Sergey Baburin	Power to the People
1999	Aleksandr Vereteno (Note: drowned in April 2002)	Independent
2003	Aleksandr Kharitonov	Independent

== Election results ==
=== 1993 ===
==== Declared candidates ====
- Sergey Baburin (Independent), former People's Deputy of Russia (1990–1993), chairman of the Russian All-People's Union party (1991–present)
- Iosif Diskin (Civic Union), economist
- Vladimir Kozlov (Independent), aircraft captain at Omskavia
- Aleksandr Kravets (CPRF), first secretary of the party regional committee
- Sergey Nosovets (Independent), former People's Deputy of Russia (1990–1993)
- Valentin Zolnikov (Independent), construction businessman

==== Withdrawn candidates ====
- Aleksandr Levchenko (PRES), businessman

==== Results ====
Summary of the 12 December 1993 Russian legislative election in the Central constituency
Candidate	Party	Votes	%
Sergey Baburin	Independent	73,261	26.68%
Sergey Nosovets	Independent	61,755	22.49%
Valentin Zolnikov	Independent	29,546	10.76%
Vladimir Kozlov	Independent	22,674	8.26%
Aleksandr Kravets	Communist Party	15,513	5.65%
Iosif Diskin	Civic Union	3,034	1.11%
against all		44,845	16.33%
Total		274,560	100%

=== 1995 ===
==== Declared candidates ====
- Sergey Baburin (Power to the People), incumbent Member of State Duma (1994–present), chairman of the Russian All-People's Union party (1991–present)
- Yury Chesnokov (BN)
- Galiba Kirilenko (NDR), businesswoman
- Aleksandr Kravets (CPRF), Deputy Chairman of the Omsk City Council (1994–present), 1993 candidate for this seat
- Aleksandr Minzhurenko (DVR-OD), Member of State Duma (1994–present)
- Valentin Plotnitsky (LDPR)
- Viktor Potapov (ROD), former Member of Omsk Oblast Council of People's Deputies (1990–1993), computer science professor
- Vladimir Slobodyan (Independent)

==== Results ====
Summary of the 17 December 1995 Russian legislative election in the Central constituency
Candidate	Party	Votes	%
Sergey Baburin (incumbent)	Power to the People	82,843	27.61%
Aleksandr Minzhurenko	Democratic Choice of Russia – United Democrats	46,446	15.48%
Galina Kirilenko	Our Home – Russia	31,142	10.38%
Aleksandr Kravets	Communist Party	30,914	10.30%
Valentin Plotnitsky	Liberal Democratic Party	18,760	6.25%
Viktor Potapov	Russian All-People's Movement	10,619	3.54%
Yury Chesnokov	Bloc of Independents	9,511	3.17%
Vladimir Slobodyan	Independent	5,174	1.72%
against all		54,651	18.22%
Total		300,003	100%

=== 1999 ===
==== Declared candidates ====
- Sergey Baburin (ROS), Deputy Chairman of the State Duma (1996–present), incumbent Member of State Duma (1994–present), chairman of the Russian All-People's Union party (1991–present)
- Igor Basov (Unity), nonprofit chairman
- Aleksandr Grass (Independent), journalist
- Sergey Kiriyenko (RPP), chairman of the party regional office
- Vasily Konovalov (DN), nonprofit president, hockey coach
- Aleksandr Kravets (CPRF), Member of State Duma (1996–present), 1993 and 1995 candidate for this seat, 1999 gubernatorial candidate
- Grigory Mokoseyev (Independent), electrician
- Yevgeny Muzyka (LDPR), ship doctor
- Yury Redkin (Kedr), Omsk State Medical Academy pharmacology department head
- Vyacheslav Shalayev (KRO-Boldyrev), businessman
- Andrey Shepelin (Independent), attorney
- Aleksandr Vereteno (Independent), Member of Legislative Assembly of Omsk Oblast (1998–present), businessman

==== Failed to qualify ====
- Tamara Malozyomova (Independent)
- Aleksandr Okhrimenko (Independent), brewery director
- Igor Safaryants (Independent)
- Pavel Shukhlin (For Civil Dignity), SibADI senior lecturer
- Boris Smolnikov (Independent), union official

==== Did not file ====
- Andrey Butskikh (Nikolayev–Fyodorov Bloc), businessman
- Aleksandr Chernyak (Independent), depositors rights activist
- Nina Chipurina (Independent), pensioner
- Dmitry Gorbunov (Independent), unemployed
- Aleksandr Ilyushchenko (Independent)
- Valentin Kuznetsov (Independent), unemployed
- Yury Matveyev (Independent)
- Aleksandr Nechaykin (Independent)
- Faina Sanina (Independent), nonprofit president
- Viktor Shatalov (Independent)
- Boris Suprunyuk (Independent), journalist
- Andrey Yefremov (Independent)

==== Results ====
Summary of the 19 December 1999 Russian legislative election in the Central constituency
Candidate	Party	Votes	%
Aleksandr Vereteno	Independent	83,889	29.72%
Aleksandr Kravets	Communist Party	69,783	24.72%
Sergey Baburin (incumbent)	Russian All-People's Union	33,899	12.01%
Sergey Kiriyenko	Party of Pensioners	13,739	4.87%
Igor Basov	Unity	11,265	3.99%
Yury Redkin	Kedr	6,593	2.34%
Aleksandr Grass	Independent	4,157	1.47%
Yevgeny Muzyka	Liberal Democratic Party	3,550	1.26%
Andrey Shepelin	Independent	3,198	1.13%
Grigory Mokoseyev	Independent	2,316	0.82%
Vasily Konovalov	Spiritual Heritage	1,730	0.61%
against all		42,970	15.22%
Total		282,277	100%

=== 2002 ===
==== Declared candidates ====
- Ivan Belsky (Independent), pensioner
- Aleksandr Korotkov (Independent), former Deputy Governor of Omsk Oblast (1997–2001)
- Vladimir Vereteno (Independent), Member of Legislative Assembly of Omsk Oblast (2000–present), businessman, brother of former State Duma member Aleksandr Vereteno
- Nikolay Yefimkin (Independent), construction executive, chairman of the Union of Right Forces regional office

==== Did not file ====
- Igor Basov (Independent), nonprofit chairman, 1999 Unity candidate for this seat
- Valentin Kuznetsov (Independent), engineer, 1999 candidate for this seat
- Andrey Puchkov (Independent), locksmith

==== Declined ====
- Sergey Baburin (People's Will), former Deputy Chairman of the State Duma (1996–1999), former Member of State Duma (1994–1999), chairman of the People's Will party (2001–present)
- Vladimir Dorokhin (CPRF), former Member of Legislative Assembly of Omsk Oblast (1998–2002), agriculture businessman
- Konstantin Potapov (Independent), Member of Legislative Assembly of Omsk Oblast (2002–present), vice president of Sibneft
- Oleg Shishov (Independent), Member of Legislative Assembly of Omsk Oblast (1994–present), construction businessman

==== Results ====
The results of the by-election were annulled due to low turnout (11.92%)

Summary of the 29 September 2002 by-election in the Central constituency
Candidate	Party	Votes	%
Vladimir Vereteno	Independent	27,166	44.93%
Nikolay Yefimkin	Independent	8,562	14.16%
Aleksandr Korotkov	Independent	6,239	10.32%
Ivan Belsky	Independent	4,576	7.57%
against all		12,174	20.13%
Total		60,463	100%

=== 2003 ===
==== Declared candidates ====
- Nikolay Gorbatenko (APR), agriculture cooperative chairman
- Aleksandr Grass (Independent), journalist, 1999 candidate for this seat
- Aleksandr Kharitonov (Independent), Chief of the Omsk Academy of the Ministry of Internal Affairs (1987–present)
- Aleksandr Kravets (CPRF), Member of State Duma (1996–present), 1993, 1995 and 1999 candidate for this seat, 1999 gubernatorial candidate
- Leonid Mayevsky (Independent), Member of State Duma (2000–present), 2003 gubernatorial candidate
- Alexander Panychev (PVR-RPZh), Omsk State Transport University institute deputy director
- Yury Redkin (The Greens), Omsk State Medical Academy pharmacology department head, 1999 candidate for this seat
- Dmitry Sapunov (Independent), Omsk City Council staffer
- Dmitry Shustov (Independent), businessman
- Nikolay Yefimkin (SPS), nonprofit president, 2002 candidate for this seat
- Valentina Zakharchenko (LDPR), cloakroom attendant

==== Did not file ====
- Stepan Krikukha (RPP-PSS), chairman of the Russian Party of Pensioners regional office
- Valentin Kuznetsov (Independent), engineer, 1999 and 2002 candidate for this seat
- Aleksandr Lavrentyev (KPR), individual entrepreneur
- Vladimir Pirogov (DPR), journalist
- Aleksandr Rozhkov (SDPR), deputy director of the Western Siberian Medical Centre
- Nikolay Shipilov (NPPR), deputy chairman of the party executive committee

==== Results ====
Summary of the 7 December 2003 Russian legislative election in the Central constituency
Candidate	Party	Votes	%
Aleksandr Kharitonov	Independent	76,391	27.65%
Aleksandr Kravets	Communist Party	43,265	15.66%
Leonid Mayevsky	Independent	27,442	9.93%
Dmitry Shustov	Independent	18,586	6.73%
Valentina Zakharchenko	Liberal Democratic Party	13,073	4.73%
Nikolay Yefimkin	Union of Right Forces	12,417	4.49%
Yury Redkin	The Greens	9,590	3.47%
Nikolay Gorbatenko	Agrarian Party	7,800	2.82%
Aleksandr Panychev	Party of Russia's Rebirth-Russian Party of Life	5,870	2.12%
Aleksandr Grass	Independent	5,035	1.82%
Dmitry Sapunov	Independent	1,966	0.71%
against all		50,865	18.41%
Total		276,653	100%
