= 2026 Omsk Oblast legislative election =

Regional legislative election in Russia

- 18–20 September 2026

All 44 seats in the Legislative Assembly 23 seats needed for a majority
- Turnout: 45.40% ▲4.08 pp
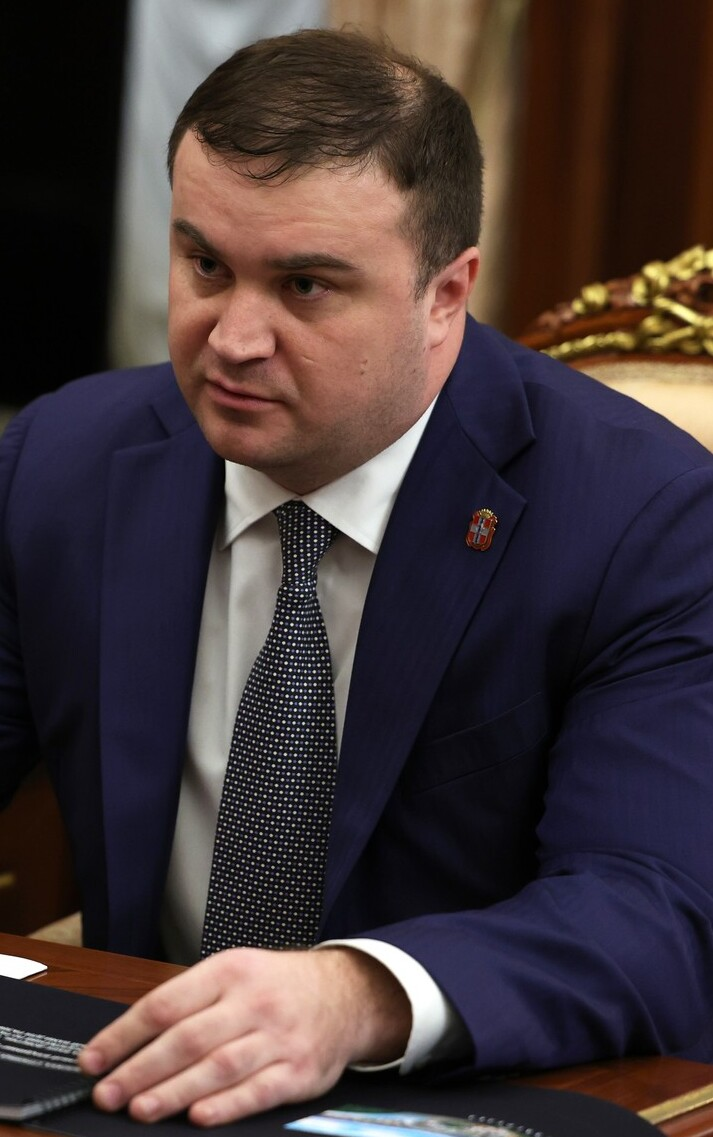

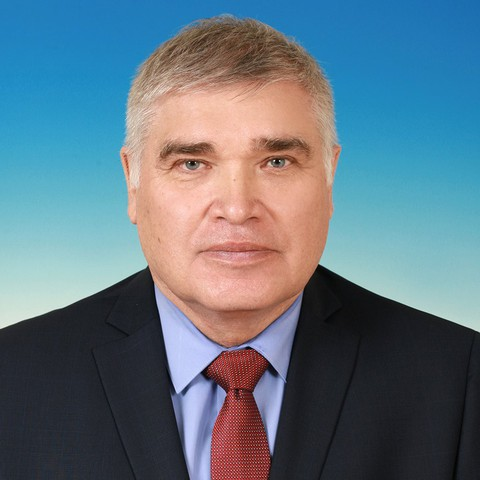

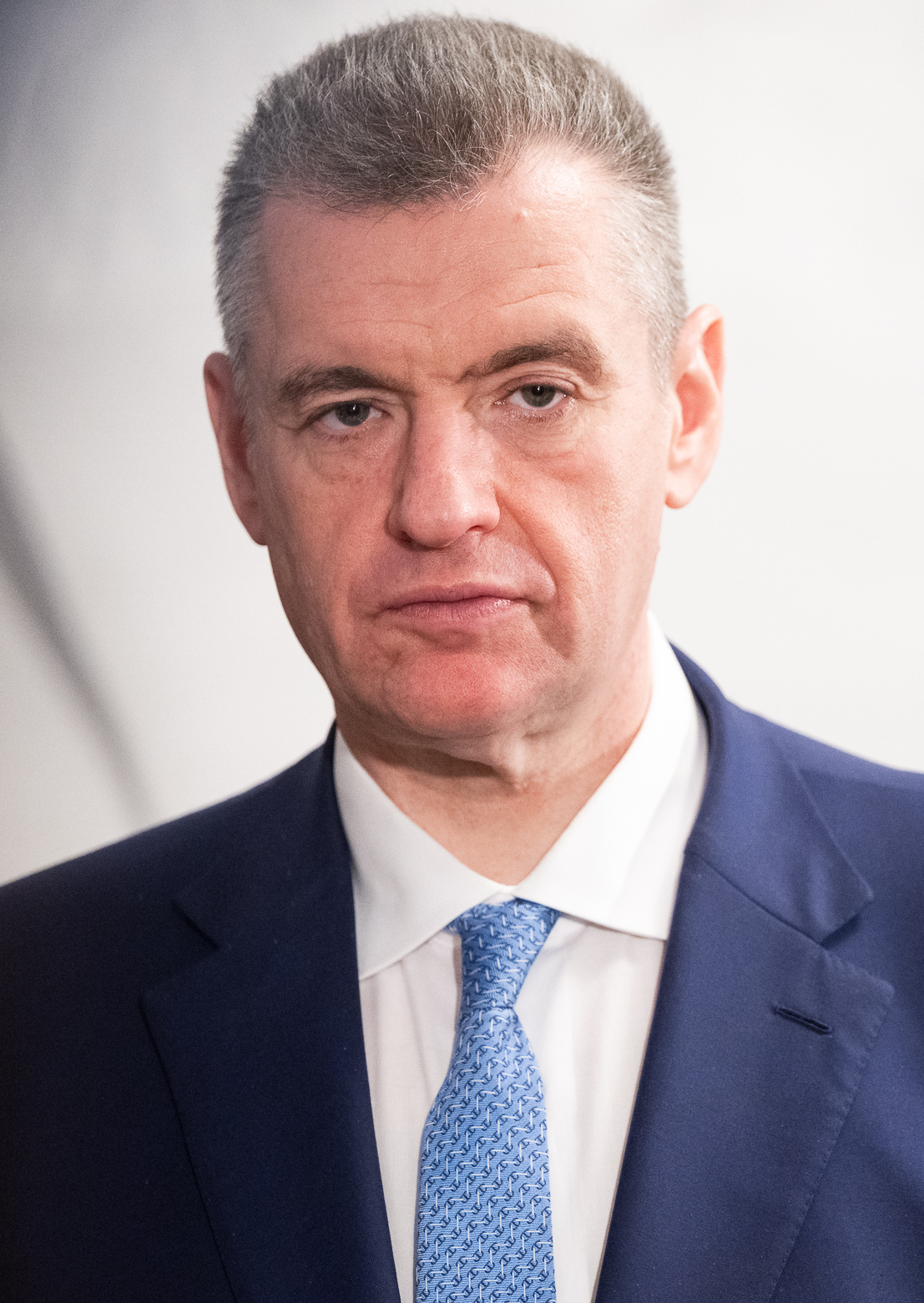
	Majority party	Minority party	Third party
			NL
Candidate	Vitaliy Khotsenko	Andrey Alekhin	Ilya Smirnov
Party	United Russia	CPRF	New People
Last election	31.29%, 26 seats	23.73%, 10 seats	8.30%, 2 seats
Seats won	35	5	2
Seat change	▲9	▼5	Steady
Popular vote	288,085	122,564	63,116
Percentage	44.72%	19.03%	9.80%
Swing	▲13.43 pp	▼4.70 pp	▲1.50 pp
	Fourth party	Fifth party	Sixth party
		SR	RPPSS
Candidate	Leonid Slutsky	Vladimir Guseletov	Iosif Drobotenko
Party	LDPR	A Just Russia	Party of Pensioners
Last election	6.78%, 1 seat	9.81%, 2 seats	4.74%, 0 seats
Seats won	2	0	0
Seat change	▲1	▼2	Steady
Popular vote	62,097	30,292	26,436
Percentage	9.64%	4.70%	4.10%
Swing	▲2.86 pp	▼5.11 pp	▼0.64 pp
Chairman before election
Aleksandr Artyomov
United Russia
Elected Chairman
Aleksandr Artyomov
United Russia
Senator before election
Dmitry Perminov
United Russia
Senator after election
Oksana Fadina
United Russia

The 2026 Legislative Assembly of Omsk Oblast election took place on 18–20 September 2026, on common election day, coinciding with the 2026 Russian legislative election. All 44 seats in the Legislative Assembly were up for re-election.

United Russia retained its majority in the Legislative Assembly, increasing it to 35 seats after winning 44.7% of the vote. Communist Party of the Russian Federation lost half of its previous faction, failing to win any single-mandate constituencies. Communists of Russia and A Just Russia suffered heavy defeat, both losing their representation in the Legislative Assembly.

== Electoral system ==
Under current election laws, the Legislative Assembly is elected for a term of five years, with parallel voting. 22 seats are elected by party-list proportional representation with a 5% electoral threshold, with the other half elected in 22 single-member constituencies by first-past-the-post voting. Seats in the proportional part are allocated using the Imperiali quota, modified to ensure that every party list, which passes the threshold, receives at least one mandate.

== Candidates ==
=== Party lists ===
To register regional lists of candidates, parties need to collect 0.5% of signatures of all registered voters in Omsk Oblast.

The following parties were relieved from the necessity to collect signatures:

- United Russia
- Communist Party of the Russian Federation
- Liberal Democratic Party of Russia
- A Just Russia
- New People
- Russian Party of Pensioners for Social Justice
- Communists of Russia

№	Party	Oblast-wide list	Candidates	Territorial groups	Status
1	United Russia	Vitaliy Khotsenko • Aleksandr Artyomov • Yevgeny Shastin • Dmitry Perminov • Vadim Berezhnoy	91	22	Registered
2	Communists of Russia	Aleksey Baykov • Andrey Yefimov • Viktor Zharkov	53	22	Registered
3	A Just Russia	Vladimir Guseletov • Aleksandr Skoblin	64	22	Registered
4	Liberal Democratic Party	Leonid Slutsky • Maksim Makalenko • Dmitry Shatunov	79	22	Registered
5	Communist Party	Andrey Alekhin • Ivan Ivchenko • Artyom Serditov • Kirill Kuryatnikov	64	22	Registered
6	Party of Pensioners	Iosif Drobotenko • Andrey Kaplya • Sergey Glatko • Marina Bragina • Aleksey Tishkovets	51	22	Registered
7	New People	Ilya Smirnov • Natalya Tuzova	69	22	Registered

=== Single-mandate constituencies ===
22 single-mandate constituencies were formed in Omsk Oblast. To register candidates in single-mandate constituencies need to collect 3% of signatures of registered voters in the constituency.

Number of candidates in single-mandate constituencies
Party	Candidates	
Party	Nominated	Registered
United Russia	22	22
Communist Party	22	20
Communists of Russia	22	21
A Just Russia	21	18
New People	22	20
Liberal Democratic Party	22	21
Party of Pensioners	21	21
Total	152	143

== Results ==
=== Results by party lists ===
Summary of the 18–20 September 2026 Legislative Assembly of Omsk Oblast election results
Party	Party list					Constituency		Total	
Party	Votes	%	±pp	Seats	+/–	Seats	+/–	Seats	+/–
United Russia	288,085	44.72	▲13.43	13	▲5	22	▲4	35	▲9
Communist Party	122,564	19.03	▼4.70	5	▼1	0	▼4	5	▼5
New People	63,116	9.80	▲1.50	2	Steady	0	Steady	2	Steady
Liberal Democratic Party	62,097	9.64	▲2.86	2	▲1	0	Steady	2	▲1
A Just Russia	30,292	4.70	▼5.11	0	▼2	0	Steady	0	▼2
Party of Pensioners	26,436	4.10	▼0.64	0	Steady	0	Steady	0	Steady
Communists of Russia	26,265	4.08	▼6.92	0	▼3	0	Steady	0	▼3
Invalid ballots	25,344	3.93	▼0.43	—	—	—	—	—	—
Total	644,199	100.00	—	22	Steady	22	Steady	44	Steady
Turnout	644,199	45.40	▲4.08	—	—	—	—	—	—
Registered voters	1,418,953	100.00	—	—	—	—	—	—	—

Aleksandr Artyomov (United Russia) was re-elected as Chairman of the Legislative Assembly. State Duma member Oksana Fadina (United Russia) was appointed to the Federation Council, replacing incumbent Senator Dmitry Perminov (United Russia), who was elected to the State Duma.

=== Results in single-member constituencies ===
==== District 1 ====
Summary of the 18–20 September 2026 Legislative Assembly of Omsk Oblast election in Kirovsky constituency No.1
Candidate	Party	Votes	%
Valery Kokorin (incumbent)	United Russia	9,337	35.12%
Bronislav Drozdovich	Communist Party	5,640	21.21%
Natalya Donskikh	A Just Russia	3,065	11.35%
Danila Prokopyev	New People	2,788	10.49%
Andrey Chernikov	Liberal Democratic Party	1,957	7.36%
Nikolay Ivanov	Communists of Russia	1,314	4.94%
Iosif Drobotenko	Party of Pensioners	1,180	4.44%
Total		26,585	100%

==== District 2 ====
Summary of the 18–20 September 2026 Legislative Assembly of Omsk Oblast election in Kirovsky constituency No.2
Candidate	Party	Votes	%
Andrey Kipervar (incumbent)	United Russia	7,840	29.05%
Sergey Chistyakov	Communist Party	4,540	16.82%
Yury Lavrov	New People	4,254	15.76%
Yulia Izbysheva	A Just Russia	2,840	10.52%
Igor Basov	Party of Pensioners	2,116	7.84%
Mikhail Shivlyakov	Liberal Democratic Party	2,047	7.58%
Aleksandr Nazarov	Communists of Russia	2,038	7.55%
Total		26,988	100%

==== District 3 ====
Summary of the 18–20 September 2026 Legislative Assembly of Omsk Oblast election in Sovetsky-Kirovsky constituency No.3
Candidate	Party	Votes	%
Vyacheslav Vasilyev (incumbent)	United Russia	9,070	38.18%
Boris Markov	Communist Party	4,511	18.99%
Aleksey Matyutin	New People	2,834	11.93%
Aleksandr Markov	Liberal Democratic Party	2,002	8.43%
Igor Sheremetyev	A Just Russia	1,619	6.81%
Yakov Konyayev	Party of Pensioners	1,396	5.88%
Dmitry Markov	Communists of Russia	1,012	4.26%
Total		23,759	100%

==== District 4 ====
Summary of the 18–20 September 2026 Legislative Assembly of Omsk Oblast election in Sovetsky constituency No.4
Candidate	Party	Votes	%
Ivan Kotenko	United Russia	5,787	24.41%
Vladimir Guseletov	A Just Russia	4,676	19.72%
Vladimir Bykov	Communist Party	4,514	19.04%
Georgy Dominyak	New People	2,564	10.81%
Aleksey Bykov	Communists of Russia	1,909	8.05%
Aleksey Lozhkin	Liberal Democratic Party	1,871	7.89%
Tatyana Petrikevich	Party of Pensioners	1,254	5.29%
Total		23,711	100%

==== District 5 ====
Summary of the 18–20 September 2026 Legislative Assembly of Omsk Oblast election in Sovetsky constituency No.5
Candidate	Party	Votes	%
Semyon Sokur	United Russia	6,273	27.80%
Mikhail Fedotov	Communist Party	4,969	22.02%
Yury Titov	New People	4,208	18.65%
Vyacheslav Davydenko	A Just Russia	2,931	12.99%
Andrey Starodub	Liberal Democratic Party	2,151	9.53%
Nikita Fedotov	Communists of Russia	905	4.01%
Total		22,563	100%

==== District 6 ====
Summary of the 18–20 September 2026 Legislative Assembly of Omsk Oblast election in Central-Sovetsky constituency No.6
Candidate	Party	Votes	%
Igor Vereteno (incumbent)	United Russia	9,215	
Kirill Kuryatnikov	Communist Party	4,766	
Andrey Futin	New People	3,368	
Tatyana Nikishkina	Party of Pensioners	2,030	
Andrey Yefimov	Communists of Russia	1,934	
Roman Kuzlyakin	A Just Russia	1,751	
Total			100%

==== District 7 ====
Summary of the 18–20 September 2026 Legislative Assembly of Omsk Oblast election in Central constituency No.7
Candidate	Party	Votes	%
Dmitry Shishkin (incumbent)	United Russia	6,957	30.08%
Yelena Ivchenko	Communist Party	6,524	28.21%
Vladislav Yarmolovich	New People	2,762	11.94%
Maksim Rodionov	Liberal Democratic Party	2,626	11.36%
Yelena Ivchenko	Communists of Russia	1,784	7.71%
Yevgeny Tarasov	Party of Pensioners	1,298	5.61%
Total		23,125	100%

==== District 8 ====
Summary of the 18–20 September 2026 Legislative Assembly of Omsk Oblast election in Central constituency No.8
Candidate	Party	Votes	%
Igor Popov (incumbent)	United Russia	7,834	33.34%
Sairan Shagayev	Communist Party	5,023	21.38%
Nikolay Reshetnikov	New People	2,777	11.82%
Maksim Mitrofanov	Liberal Democratic Party	1,878	7.99%
Tatyana Nagibina	A Just Russia	1,779	7.57%
Olga Dobash	Party of Pensioners	1,707	7.26%
Vladimir Zhukov	Communists of Russia	1,426	6.07%
Total		23,499	100%

==== District 9 ====
Summary of the 18–20 September 2026 Legislative Assembly of Omsk Oblast election in Central-Oktyabrsky-Leninsky constituency No.9
Candidate	Party	Votes	%
Maksim Kontsedalov	United Russia	6,650	27.58%
Anatoly Kazak (incumbent)	Communist Party	4,789	19.86%
Dmitry Shevchenko	New People	3,819	15.84%
Tatyana Snegireva	A Just Russia	2,290	9.50%
Vladimir Abramov	Communists of Russia	2,284	9.47%
Gleb Babykin	Liberal Democratic Party	1,923	7.97%
Denis Kazak	Party of Pensioners	1,194	4.95%
Total		24,116	100%

==== District 10 ====
Summary of the 18–20 September 2026 Legislative Assembly of Omsk Oblast election in Central-Oktyabrsky constituency No.10
Candidate	Party	Votes	%
Igor Zuga (incumbent)	United Russia	12,142	45.46%
Denis Vorobyov	Communist Party	5,224	19.56%
Aleksey Baykov	Communists of Russia	2,529	9.47%
Artyom Myshkin	Liberal Democratic Party	2,038	7.63%
Igor Metelev	A Just Russia	1,991	7.45%
Aleksey Tishkovets	Party of Pensioners	1,371	5.13%
Total		26,710	100%

==== District 11 ====
Summary of the 18–20 September 2026 Legislative Assembly of Omsk Oblast election in Oktyabrsky-Leninsky constituency No.11
Candidate	Party	Votes	%
Yury Shapovalov	United Russia	6,805	31.75%
Maksim Mikhaylenko (incumbent)	Communist Party	3,817	17.81%
Valery Kovalenko	Liberal Democratic Party	2,284	10.66%
Aleksey Khomitsky	New People	2,187	10.21%
Yevgeny Mikhaylenko	Communists of Russia	1,843	8.60%
Igor Meyer	A Just Russia	1,704	7.95%
Denis Kashirin	Party of Pensioners	1,555	7.26%
Total		21,430	100%

==== District 12 ====
Summary of the 18–20 September 2026 Legislative Assembly of Omsk Oblast election in Leninsky constituency No.12
Candidate	Party	Votes	%
Vladimir Berezovsky (incumbent)	United Russia	9,467	36.49%
Igor Kozlovsky	Communist Party	4,370	16.85%
Natalya Lyovochkina	New People	3,247	12.52%
Yelena German	Liberal Democratic Party	2,459	9.48%
Sergey Kovalev	Communists of Russia	1,627	6.27%
Anton Sychyov	Party of Pensioners	1,480	5.71%
Kirill Kalyakin	A Just Russia	1,448	5.58%
Total		25,941	100%

==== District 13 ====
Summary of the 18–20 September 2026 Legislative Assembly of Omsk Oblast election in Leninsky-Kirovsky constituency No.13
Candidate	Party	Votes	%
Vladimir Sedelnikov (incumbent)	United Russia	9,091	37.93%
Aleksandr Kalugin	Communist Party	4,916	20.51%
Aleksandr Smelyakov	New People	3,295	13.75%
Dmitry Slepchenko	Liberal Democratic Party	1,855	7.74%
Oleg Bereshchuk	Communists of Russia	1,781	7.43%
Yevgeny Skatov	Party of Pensioners	1,428	5.96%
Total		23,965	100%

==== District 14 ====
Summary of the 18–20 September 2026 Legislative Assembly of Omsk Oblast election in Tyukalinsky constituency No.14
Candidate	Party	Votes	%
Sergey Kovalenko	United Russia	15,151	46.34%
Dmitry Vershinin	Communists of Russia	4,777	14.61%
Mikhail Dyatlov	Communist Party	4,600	14.07%
Aleksey Shakhov	New People	2,650	8.11%
Sergey Shiryayev	Liberal Democratic Party	2,297	7.03%
Vladimir Lifantyev	A Just Russia	1,598	4.89%
Total		32,695	100%

==== District 15 ====
Summary of the 18–20 September 2026 Legislative Assembly of Omsk Oblast election in Tarsky constituency No.15
Candidate	Party	Votes	%
Murat Adyrbayev (incumbent)	United Russia	18,476	53.53%
Oleg Balagansky	Communist Party	3,861	11.19%
Lyudmila Zhukova	New People	2,563	7.43%
Irina Baginskaya	Communists of Russia	2,531	7.33%
Yevgeny Minin	Liberal Democratic Party	1,924	5.57%
Dmitry Krasnousov	A Just Russia	1,898	5.50%
Aleksey Kuchuk	Party of Pensioners	1,840	5.33%
Total		34,516	100%

==== District 16 ====
Summary of the 18–20 September 2026 Legislative Assembly of Omsk Oblast election in Muromtsevsky constituency No.16
Candidate	Party	Votes	%
Valery Boyko (incumbent)	United Russia	19,454	54.69%
Anton Voronov	Communist Party	5,498	15.46%
Shamil Karlamechev	New People	3,133	8.81%
Sofia Pechenina	A Just Russia	1,685	4.74%
Vitaly Otboyshchikov	Liberal Democratic Party	1,632	4.59%
Aleksandr Kokin	Party of Pensioners	1,432	4.03%
Ivan Lizunov	Communists of Russia	1,162	3.27%
Total		35,574	100%

==== District 17 ====
Summary of the 18–20 September 2026 Legislative Assembly of Omsk Oblast election in Lyubinsky constituency No.17
Candidate	Party	Votes	%
Gennady Walter	United Russia	28,162	66.21%
Yevgenia Volkova	Communist Party	4,049	9.52%
Viktor Kravtsov	Liberal Democratic Party	3,239	7.62%
Anastasia Volkova	Communists of Russia	2,816	6.62%
Makhabbat Saparova	Party of Pensioners	1,446	3.40%
Nikita Pashinsky	A Just Russia	1,314	3.09%
Total		42,532	100%

==== District 18 ====
Summary of the 18–20 September 2026 Legislative Assembly of Omsk Oblast election in Omsky constituency No.18
Candidate	Party	Votes	%
Dmitry Golovanov	United Russia	10,891	34.41%
Maksim Antonov	Communist Party	8,200	25.90%
Natalya Plotnikova	New People	3,089	9.76%
Aleksey Antonov	Communists of Russia	2,875	9.08%
Vyacheslav Polyakov	Liberal Democratic Party	2,049	6.47%
Valentin Toropov	A Just Russia	1,485	4.69%
Vadim Yesipenko	Party of Pensioners	1,332	4.21%
Total		31,655	100%

==== District 19 ====
Summary of the 18–20 September 2026 Legislative Assembly of Omsk Oblast election in Kormilovsky constituency No.19
Candidate	Party	Votes	%
Mikhail Karakoz	United Russia	12,059	38.51%
Yevgeny Katugin	Communist Party	5,384	17.19%
Nadezhda Volodeva	New People	4,135	13.20%
Sergey Khaminov	Liberal Democratic Party	2,682	8.56%
Tatyana Chernikova	A Just Russia	1,993	6.36%
Igor Katunin	Communists of Russia	1,793	5.73%
Aleksandr Mungalov	Party of Pensioners	1,392	4.44%
Total		31,318	100%

==== District 20 ====
Summary of the 18–20 September 2026 Legislative Assembly of Omsk Oblast election in Cherlaksky constituency No.20
Candidate	Party	Votes	%
Pavel Korennoy (incumbent)	United Russia	13,974	44.29%
Maria Vinnichenko	Communist Party	5,108	16.19%
Dmitry Aksenov	Communists of Russia	3,713	11.77%
Andrey Wunsch	Liberal Democratic Party	2,629	8.33%
Aleksandra Bykova	Party of Pensioners	2,463	7.81%
Aleksey Stieb	New People	1,828	5.79%
Total		31,551	100%

==== District 21 ====
Summary of the 18–20 September 2026 Legislative Assembly of Omsk Oblast election in Pavlogradsky constituency No.21
Candidate	Party	Votes	%
Vladimir Pushkarev (incumbent)	United Russia	22,842	52.69%
Sergey Solovyov	New People	6,125	14.13%
Andrey Kaplya	Party of Pensioners	6,047	13.95%
Mikhail Belonogov	Liberal Democratic Party	5,941	13.70%
Total		43,351	100%

==== District 22 ====
Summary of the 18–20 September 2026 Legislative Assembly of Omsk Oblast election in Poltavsky constituency No.22
Candidate	Party	Votes	%
Dmitry Mishurov	United Russia	12,534	37.40%
Kirill Atamanichenko	Liberal Democratic Party	6,603	19.70%
Anatoly Shnyr	Communists of Russia	3,802	11.34%
Sergey Fesenko	New People	3,608	10.76%
Iosif Drobotenko	Party of Pensioners	2,802	8.36%
Ruslan Ibragimov	A Just Russia	1,995	5.95%
Total		33,517	100%

=== Members ===
Incumbent deputies are highlighted with bold, elected members who declined to take a seat are marked with ~~strikethrough~~.

Constituency
No.	Member	Party
1	Valery Kokorin	United Russia
2	Andrey Kipervar	United Russia
3	Vyacheslav Vasilyev	United Russia
4	Ivan Kotenko	United Russia
5	Semyon Sokur	United Russia
6	Igor Vereteno	United Russia
7	Dmitry Shishkin	United Russia
8	Igor Popov	United Russia
9	Maksim Kontsedalov	United Russia
10	Igor Zuga	United Russia
11	Yury Shapovalov	United Russia
12	Vladimir Berezovsky	United Russia
13	Vladimir Sedelnikov	United Russia
14	Sergey Kovalenko	United Russia
15	Murat Adyrbayev	United Russia
16	Valery Boyko	United Russia
17	Gennady Walter	United Russia
18	Dmitry Golovanov	United Russia
19	Mikhail Karakoz	United Russia
20	Pavel Korennoy	United Russia
21	Vladimir Pushkarev	United Russia
22	Dmitry Mishurov	United Russia

Party lists
Member	Party
~~Vitaliy Khotsenko~~	United Russia
Aleksandr Artyomov	United Russia
Yevgeny Shastin	United Russia
~~Dmitry Perminov~~	United Russia
Vadim Berezhnoy	United Russia
Oksana Fadina	United Russia
Yevgeny Yelovik	United Russia
Tamara Balandina	United Russia
Ashot Tatoyan	United Russia
Svetlana Enverova	United Russia
Vladimir Gerk	United Russia
Andrey Bondarenko	United Russia
Aleksandr Dinkelacker	United Russia
Aleksei Tishchenko	United Russia
Andrey Nikitin	United Russia
Andrey Alekhin	Communist Party
Ivan Ivchenko	Communist Party
Artyom Serditov	Communist Party
Kirill Kuryatnikov	Communist Party
Yelena Ivchenko	Communist Party
Ilya Smirnov	New People
Natalya Tuzova	New People
~~Leonid Slutsky~~	Liberal Democratic Party
Maksim Makalenko	Liberal Democratic Party
Dmitry Shatunov	Liberal Democratic Party

== See also ==
- 2026 Russian regional elections
