= Lyubinsky constituency =

Legislative territory in Russia

Lyubinsky single-member constituency
- Constituency of the Russian State Duma

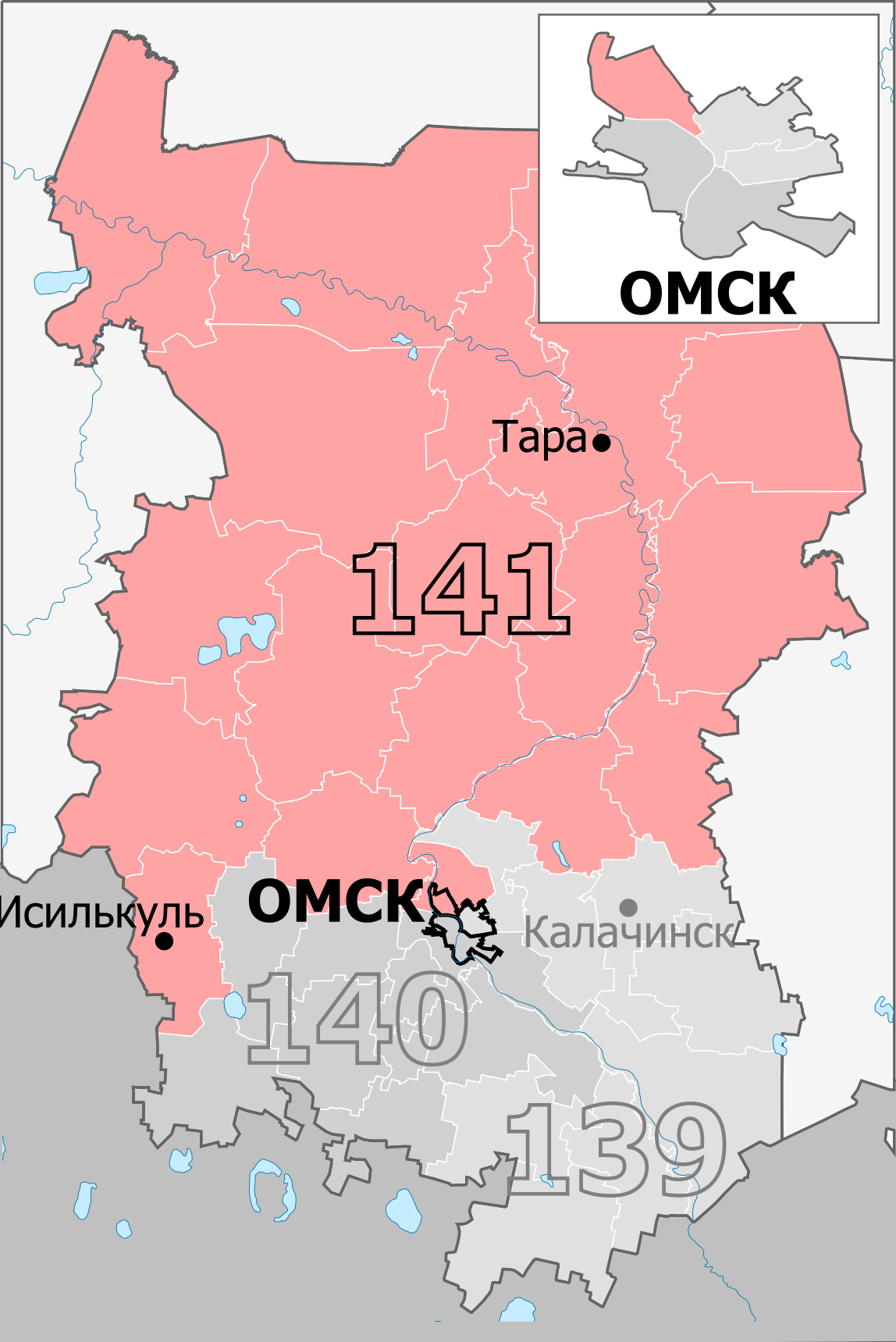
- Constituency boundaries since 2016
- Deputy: Igor Antropenko; United Russia
- Federal subject: Omsk Oblast
- Districts: Bolsherechensky, Bolsheukovsky, Gorkovsky, Isilkulsky, Kolosovsky, Krutinsky, Lyubinsky, Muromtsevsky, Nazyvayevsky, Nizhneomsky, Omsk (Sovetsky), Omsky (Chernoluchinsky, Pushkinskoye), Sargatsky, Sedelnikovsky, Tarsky, Tevrizsky, Tyukalinsky, Ust-Ishimsky, Znamensky
- Voters: 439,834 (2026)

The Lyubinsky constituency (No.143 (Note: Bolsherechye constituency No.128 in 1993-2007, No.141 in 2016–2026)) is a Russian legislative constituency in Omsk Oblast. The constituency covers north-western Omsk and mostly rural northern 2/3 of Omsk Oblast.

The constituency has been represented since 2026 by United Russia deputy Igor Antropenko, two-term State Duma member and businessman, who won the open seat after one-term United Russia incumbent Oksana Fadina ran for Legislative Assembly of Omsk Oblast.

== Boundaries ==
1993–1995 Bolsherechye constituency: Azovsky Nemetsky National District, Bolsherechensky District, Bolsheukovsky District, Gorkovsky District, Isilkul, Isilkulsky District, Kolosovsky District, Krutinsky District, Lyubinsky District, Maryanovsky District, Moskalensky District, Muromtsevsky District, Nazyvayevsk, Nazyvayevsky District, Nizhneomsky District, Novovarshavsky District, Odessky District, Pavlogradsky District, Poltavsky District, Russko-Polyansky District, Sargatsky District, Sedelnikovsky District, Sherbakulsky District, Tara, Tarsky District, Tevrizsky District, Tyukalinsk, Tyukalinsky District, Ust-Ishimsky District, Znamensky District
The constituency covered rural northern, central and southern Omsk Oblast (except the south-eastern corner), including the towns Isilkul, Nazyvayevsk, Tara and Tyukalinsk.

1995–2007 Bolsherechye constituency: Azovsky Nemetsky National District, Bolsherechensky District, Bolsheukovsky District, Gorkovsky District, Isilkulsky District, Kolosovsky District, Kormilovsky District, Krutinsky District, Lyubinsky District, Maryanovsky District, Moskalensky District, Muromtsevsky District, Nazyvayevsky District, Nizhneomsky District, Novovarshavsky District, Odessky District, Pavlogradsky District, Poltavsky District, Russko-Polyansky District, Sargatsky District, Sedelnikovsky District, Sherbakulsky District, Tarsky District, Tevrizsky District, Tyukalinsky District, Ust-Ishimsky District, Znamensky District
After the 1995 redistricting the constituency was slightly altered, gaining Kormilovsky District from Omsk constituency.

2016–present: Bolsherechensky District, Bolsheukovsky District, Gorkovsky District, Isilkulsky District, Kolosovsky District, Krutinsky District, Lyubinsky District, Muromtsevsky District, Nazyvayevsky District, Nizhneomsky District, Omsk (Sovetsky), Omsky District (Chernoluchinsky, Pushkinskoye), Sargatsky District, Sedelnikovsky District, Tarsky District, Tevrizsky District, Tyukalinsky District, Ust-Ishimsky District, Znamensky District
The constituency was re-created for the 2016 election under the name "Lyubinsky constituency" and retained only northern and central Omsk Oblast, losing south-western part to new Moskalenki constituency and districts in the south-east to Omsk constituency. This seat instead was pushed into Omsk, gaining Sovetsky City District from the eliminated Central constituency and its north-western suburbs from Omsk constituency.

== Members elected ==
Election	Member	Party
1993	Oleg Zharov	Independent
1995	Sergey Manyakin	Power to the People
1999	Aleksandr Podgursky	Independent
2003	Sergey Vorobchukov	Independent
2007	Proportional representation - no election by constituency	
2011	Proportional representation - no election by constituency	
2016	Andrey Golushko	United Russia
2021	Oksana Fadina	United Russia
2026	Igor Antropenko	United Russia

== Election results ==
=== 1993 ===
Summary of the 12 December 1993 Russian legislative election in the Bolsherechye constituency
Candidate	Party	Votes	%
Oleg Zharov	Independent	93,757	28.11%
Aleksandr Luppov	Independent	49,842	14.95%
Ivan Folyak	Independent	38,285	11.48%
Vladimir Nikolayev	Independent	38,089	11.42%
Khakim Sadykov	Independent	20,356	6.10%
Vasily Ivakhnenko	Independent	11,575	3.47%
Aleksandr Seleznev	Communist Party	9,790	2.94%
against all		47,306	14.19%
Total		333,483	100%

=== 1995 ===
Summary of the 17 December 1995 Russian legislative election in the Bolsherechye constituency
Candidate	Party	Votes	%
Sergey Manyakin	Power to the People	79,779	21.09%
Vladimir Vorotnikov	Agrarian Party	79,203	20.94%
Gennady Baranov	Our Home – Russia	67,679	17.89%
Yevgeny Rokhin	Liberal Democratic Party	31,269	8.27%
Oleg Zharov (incumbent)	Ivan Rybkin Bloc	26,326	6.96%
Khakim Sadykov	Nur	14,958	3.95%
Ivan Folyak	Democratic Choice of Russia – United Democrats	12,596	3.33%
Rheingold Rutz	Russian All-People's Movement	10,789	2.85%
Vladimir Frish	Independent	7,164	1.89%
Aleksandr Resnenko	Independent	3,430	0.91%
against all		38,563	10.20%
Total		378,231	100%

=== 1999 ===
Results by district: Aleksandr Podgursky: 30–40% 40–50% 50–60%; Vladimir Dorokhin: 30–40% 40–50% 50–60%

Summary of the 19 December 1999 Russian legislative election in the Bolsherechye constituency
Candidate	Party	Votes	%
Aleksandr Podgursky	Independent	122,780	36.08%
Vladimir Dorokhin	Communist Party	106,836	31.40%
Svetlana Volchanina	For Civil Dignity	30,264	8.89%
Gennady Girich	Yabloko	13,461	3.96%
Aleksey Alekseytsev	Andrey Nikolayev and Svyatoslav Fyodorov Bloc	8,870	2.61%
Yury Shadrin	Independent	8,333	2.45%
Vladimir Yepanchintsev	Russian Socialist Party	5,695	1.67%
against all		37,751	11.09%
Total		340,295	100%

=== 2003 ===
Summary of the 7 December 2003 Russian legislative election in the Bolsherechye constituency
Candidate	Party	Votes	%
Sergey Vorobchukov	Independent	243,330	74.91%
Vladimir Dorokhin	Communist Party	45,169	13.91%
Vasily Leonov	Agrarian Party	7,399	2.28%
Leonid Makushin	Union of Right Forces	7,372	2.27%
against all		17,857	5.50%
Total		325,085	100%

=== 2016 ===
Summary of the 18 September 2016 Russian legislative election in the Lyubinsky constituency
Candidate	Party	Votes	%
Andrey Golushko	United Russia	92,684	43.10%
Oleg Denisenko	Communist Party	50,396	23.44%
Aleksey Lozhkin	Liberal Democratic Party	24,451	11.37%
Aleksandr Kravtsov	A Just Russia	13,709	6.38%
Aleksandr Podzorov	Communists of Russia	10,076	4.69%
Sergey Kochetkov	Party of Growth	3,519	1.64%
Boris Melnikov	Yabloko	3,413	1.59%
Olga Argat	People's Freedom Party	3,405	1.58%
Aleksey Yakimenko	Rodina	2,494	1.16%
Oleg Kolesnikov	Civic Platform	2,430	1.13%
Total		215,022	100%

=== 2021 ===
Summary of the 17-19 September 2021 Russian legislative election in the Lyubinsky constituency
Candidate	Party	Votes	%
Oksana Fadina	United Russia	89,741	42.63%
Konstantin Tkachev	Communist Party	40,698	19.33%
Vladimir Kazanin	Communists of Russia	21,513	10.22%
Yevgeny Podvorny	New People	14,797	7.03%
Vladimir Lifantyev	A Just Russia — For Truth	13,224	6.28%
Olga Dobash	Party of Pensioners	11,365	5.40%
Maksim Makalenko	Liberal Democratic Party	9,757	4.63%
Total		210,528	100%

=== 2026 ===
Summary of the 18-20 September 2026 Russian legislative election in the Lyubinsky constituency
Candidate	Party	Votes	%
Igor Antropenko	United Russia	99,321	44.59%
Anton Voronov	Communist Party	34,603	15.54%
Olga Konsevich	New People	18,324	8.23%
Maksim Rodionov	Liberal Democratic Party	15,548	6.98%
Andrey Yefimov	Communists of Russia	11,662	5.24%
Konstantin Yudin	Yabloko	10,870	4.88%
Vladimir Lifantyev	A Just Russia	10,440	4.69%
Aleksey Kuchuk	Party of Pensioners	10,404	4.67%
Total		222,721	100%
