= Rostovka =

Rostovka (Russian: Ростовка) is the name of several rural localities (villages, settlements, and selos) in Russia:

- Rostovka, Lipetsk Oblast, a village in Plastinsky Selsoviet of Usmansky District of Lipetsk Oblast
- Rostovka, Bolsherechensky District, Omsk Oblast, a village in Ingalinsky Rural Okrug of Bolsherechensky District of Omsk Oblast
- Rostovka, Nazyvayevsky District, Omsk Oblast, a village in Cheremnovsky Rural Okrug of Nazyvayevsky District of Omsk Oblast
- Rostovka, Omsky District, Omsk Oblast, a settlement in Rostovkinsky Rural Okrug of Omsky District of Omsk Oblast
- Rostovka, Belinsky District, Penza Oblast, a village in Kamyninsky Selsoviet of Belinsky District of Penza Oblast
- Rostovka, Kamensky District, Penza Oblast, a selo in Kamensky Selsoviet of Kamensky District of Penza Oblast
- Rostovka, Republic of Tatarstan, a selo in Bugulminsky District of the Republic of Tatarstan
- Rostovka, Vologda Oblast, a village in Borovetsky Selsoviet of Sokolsky District of Vologda Oblast
