= Omsky =

Omsky (masculine), Omskaya (feminine), or Omskoye (neuter) may refer to:

- Omsky District, a district of Omsk Oblast, Russia
- Omsky (rural locality) (Omskaya, Omskoye), name of several rural localities in Russia
- Omsk Oblast (Omskaya oblast), a federal subject of Russia
