= Chernoluchinsky =

Chernoluchinsky Чернолучинский
- Urban-type settlement
- Interactive map of Chernoluchinsky
- Location of Chernoluchinsky Chernoluchinsky (Omsk Oblast)
- Coordinates: 55.2829°N 73.0291°E
- Country: Russia
- Federal subject: Omsk Oblast
- Administrative district: Omsky District
- Founded: 1670

Population (2010 Census)
  - Total: 1,681
  - Estimate (2025): 1,475 (−12.3%)
- Time zone: UTC+6 (MSK+3)
- Postal code: 644518
- OKTMO ID: 52644153051

Chernoluchinsky (Russian: Чернолучинский) is an urban locality (an urban-type settlement) in Omsky District of Omsk Oblast, Russia. Population: 1,681 (2010 census); 2,724 (2002 census); 4,130 (1989 Soviet census).
