= Igor Antropenko =

Russian politician

Igor Antropenko MP
- Игорь Антропенко
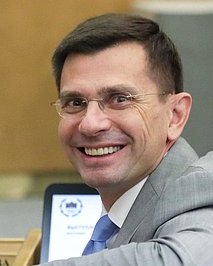

Member of the State Duma
- Incumbent
- Assumed office 12 October 2021
- Preceded by: Multi-member district
- Constituency: Omsk (No.141) (2026-); Party List (2021-2026)

Personal details
- Born: 10 December 1969 (age 56) Omsk, RSFSR, USSR
- Party: United Russia
- Education: Omsk State University; Academy of National Economy; Moscow Energy Institute

Igor Alexandrovich Antropenko (Russian: Игорь Александрович Антропенко; born on 10 December 1969 in Omsk, Russian Soviet Federative Socialist Republic) is a Russian politician and businessman who has served as a member of the State Duma since 2021.

== Education and Career ==
In 1993 he graduated from the faculty of law of the Omsk State University. Later he continued his education at the Russian Presidential Academy of National Economy and Public Administration and Moscow Power Engineering Institute. In 2004 he was awarded a Candidate of Legal Sciences degree from the Omsk Academy of the Ministry of Internal Affairs. Since 2013, he had been a part of the Board of Directors of the Omsk Electromechanical Plant.

== Political Career ==
Antropenko started his career in local politics, serving as a deputy in the Omsk City Council as a member of A Just Russia — For Truth from 2012 to 2016/. He participated twice (In 2017 and 2021) in the Omsk mayor elections, but lost both times.

In September 2021 during the 2021 Russian legislative election, he was elected to the 8th State Duma as part of the United Russia party list.

== Sanctions ==
He is one of the members of the State Duma the United States Treasury sanctioned on 24 March 2022 in response to the 2022 Russian invasion of Ukraine.

Antropenko is also subject to personal international sanctions imposed by 27 EU countries, the United Kingdom, Canada, Switzerland, Australia, Japan, Ukraine, and New Zealand.

== Personal life ==
Igor Antropenko is married and has two children.
