= Viktor Shreyder =

Russian politician (1952–2026)

- Виктор Шрейдер
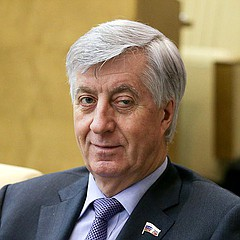
- Shreyder in 2018

Member of the State Duma
- In office 21 December 2011 – 12 October 2021
- Constituency: Proportional representation (2011–2016); Omsk (2016–2021)

Personal details
- Born: 23 February 1952 Tatarsky District, Novosibirsk Oblast, Russian SFSR, Soviet Union
- Died: 10 March 2026 (aged 74) Omsk, Russia
- Party: United Russia
- Education: Omsk Motor Transport Technical School (DS)
- Occupation: Engineer

Viktor Filippovich Shreyder (also Schreyder; Russian: Виктор Филиппович Шрейдер; 23 February 1952 – 10 March 2026) was a Russian politician. A member of United Russia, he served in the State Duma from 2011 to 2021.

Shreyder died in Omsk on 10 March 2026, at the age of 74.
