= Governor of Omsk Oblast =

Highest-ranking official in Omsk Oblast, Russia

- Coat of arms of Omsk Oblast

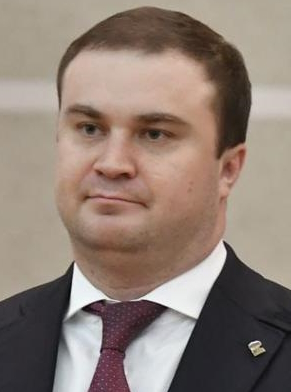
- Incumbent; Vitaliy Khotsenko since 29 March 2023
- Type: Governor; Head of state Head of government
- Seat: Omsk
- Term length: 5 years
- Constituting instrument: Charter of Omsk Oblast, Section 5
- Formation: 1991
- First holder: Leonid Polezhayev
- Website: omskportal.ru

The Governor of Omsk Oblast (Russian: Губернатор Омской области) is the head of government of Omsk Oblast, a federal subject of Russia.

The position was introduced in 1991 as Head of Administration of Omsk Oblast. The Governor is elected by direct popular vote for a term of five years.

== List of officeholders ==
No.	Portrait	Governor	Tenure	Time in office	Party	Election
1		Leonid Polezhayev (born 1940)	11 November 1991 – 30 May 2012 (term end)	20 years, 201 days	Independent → United Russia	Appointed 1995; 1999; 2003; 2007 (Note: Appointed by the president of Russia with the consent of the Legislative Assembly of Omsk Oblast.)
2		Viktor Nazarov (born 1962)	30 May 2012 – 14 May 2015 (resigned)	5 years, 132 days	United Russia	2012
—		Viktor Nazarov (born 1962)	14 May 2015 – 22 September 2015	5 years, 132 days	United Russia	Acting
(2)		Viktor Nazarov (born 1962)	22 September 2015 – 9 October 2017 (resigned)	5 years, 132 days	United Russia	2015
—		Alexander Burkov (born 1967)	9 October 2017 – 14 September 2018	5 years, 171 days	A Just Russia (Note: Elected as an independent candidate, backed by A Just Russia and United Russia.)	Acting
3		Alexander Burkov (born 1967)	14 September 2018 – 29 March 2023 (resigned)	5 years, 171 days	A Just Russia	2018
—		Vitaliy Khotsenko (born 1986)	29 March 2023 – 22 September 2023	3 years, 234 days	United Russia	Acting
4		Vitaliy Khotsenko (born 1986)	22 September 2023 – present	3 years, 234 days	United Russia	2023
