= Andrey Alekhin =

Russian politician

- Андрей Алёхин
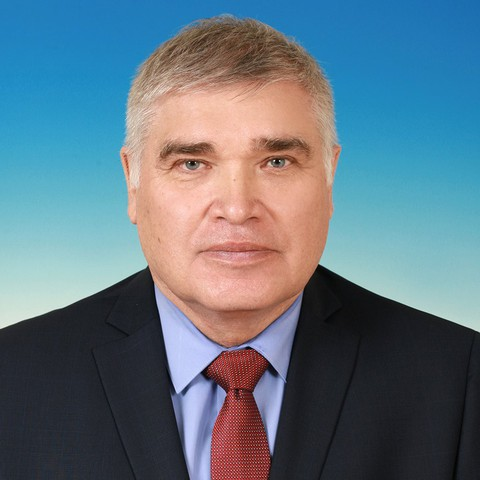

Member of the State Duma for Omsk Oblast
- Incumbent
- Assumed office 12 October 2021
- Preceded by: Viktor Shreyder
- Constituency: Omsk (No. 139)

Personal details
- Born: 9 February 1959 (age 67) Novosibirsk, RSFSR, USSR
- Party: Communist Party of the Russian Federation; CPSU (until 1991)
- Education: Novosibirsk State Technical University

Andrey Anatolievich Alekhin (Russian: Андрей Анатольевич Алёхин, born 9 February 1959 in Novosibirsk) is a Russian political figure and a deputy of the 8th State Duma.

After graduating from the Novosibirsk State Technical University, Alekhin moved to Omsk where he started working at the tannery factory.

In 1981, he graduated from the Novosibirsk Electrotechnical Institute with a degree in hydroelectric power engineering. The same year, he moved to Omsk. He worked at a leather factory as chief mechanic while simultaneously advancing through the Komsomol and party ranks.

From 1983 to 1985, he was the second secretary of the Kirov district committee of the Komsomol. In 1989–1991, he was the head of the ideological department of the Kirov district committee of the Communist Party of the Soviet Union. After the suspension of the CPSU in 1991, Alekhin started working at the administrative and technical inspection of Omsk. From 1994 to 2021, he was the deputy of the Legislative Assembly of Omsk Oblast of the 1st, 2nd, 3rd, 4th, 5th, and 6th convocations. From 2000 to 2021, he was also the second secretary of the Omsk regional committee of the Communist Party of the Russian Federation. Since September 2021, he has served as deputy of the 8th State Duma from the Omsk Oblast constitution.

== Personal life ==
Andrey Alekhin is married and has three children.
