= Viktor Nazarov (politician) =

Russian businessman and politician

- Виктор Назаров
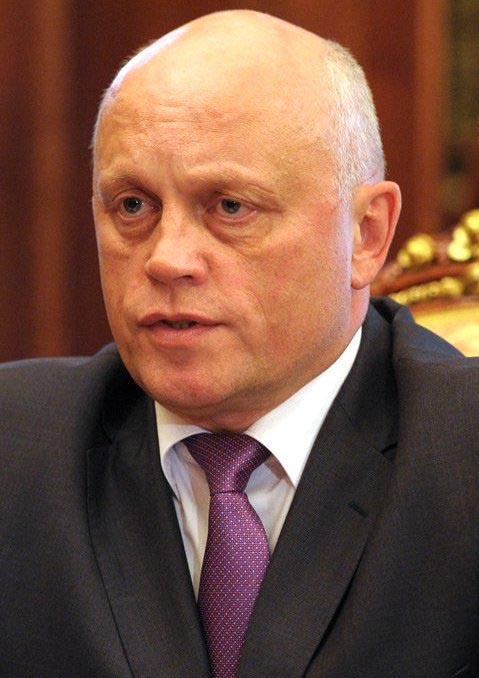
- Nazarov in 2014

Russian Federation Senator from Omsk Oblast
- In office 15 March 2018 – 29 September 2021
- Preceded by: Sergey Popov
- Succeeded by: Dmitry Perminov

2nd Governor of Omsk Oblast
- In office 30 May 2012 – 9 October 2017
- President: Vladimir Putin
- Prime Minister: Dimitry Medvedev
- Preceded by: Leonid Polezhayev
- Succeeded by: Alexander Burkov

Personal details
- Born: Viktor Ivanovich Nazarov; 18 October 1962 (age 63) Ingaly, Russia, Soviet Union
- Party: United Russia

Viktor Ivanovich Nazarov (Russian: Виктор Иванович Назаров; born 18 October 1962) is a Russian businessman and politician. Nazarov served as the 2nd Governor of Omsk Oblast from 2012 through 2017. Prior to his election as governor, he was a member of the Legislative Assembly of Omsk Oblast and the General Director of OmskRegionGaz.

== Biography ==
Nazarov was born on October 18, 1962, in the village of Ingaly in the Bolsherechensky district of the Omsk region. He graduated from Omsk State University with a degree in law.

In the December 4, 2011, elections, he was elected to the Legislative Assembly of the Omsk Region from the Tukalin Electoral District.

In April 2012, then-Russian President Dimitry Medvedev nominated him to the post of Governor and he was approved by the approved by the Legislative Assembly of Omsk Oblast in May 2012 with 43 for and 1 against his appointment. taking over May 30, 2012. The inauguration took place at the Omsk State Academic Drama Theater. On September 13, 2015, he was re-elected for a new term. Nazarov resigned as governor on October 9, 2017.
