= Omsky (rural locality) =

Omsky (Russian: О́мский; masculine), Omskaya (О́мская; feminine), or Omskoye (О́мское; neuter) is the name of several rural localities (settlements) in Russia:

- Omsky, Krasnoyarsk Krai, a settlement in Ketsky Selsoviet of Pirovsky District of Krasnoyarsk Krai
- Omsky, Omsk Oblast, a settlement in Omsky Rural Okrug of Omsky District of Omsk Oblast
