= Omsk State Medical University =

Medical school in Omsk, Russia

Coordinates: 54.9858°N 73.3740°E

- Государственное бюджетное образовательное учреждение высшего профессионального образования «Омский государственный медицинский университет» Министерства здравоохранения Российской Федерации
- Former names: West Siberian State Medical Institute; Mikhail Kalinin Omsk State Medical Institute; Omsk State Medical Academy
- Type: Public
- Established: 1920
- President: Alexander I. Novikov
- Rector: Maria A. Livzan
- Students: 5500
- Location: Lenin Street, 12, Omsk, Russia
- Language: Russian
- Website: http://www.omsk-osma.ru

The Omsk State Medical University (OSMU) is a school of medicine in Omsk, Russia.

== History ==
It was founded as the Medical Faculty of the Siberian Institute of Veterinary Medicine and Zoology in 1920, and reorganized as the West Siberian State Medical Institute in 1921. It was renamed the Omsk State Medical Institute in 1925, and the Omsk State Medical Academy in 1994.

In 2015, the Academy was assigned with the status of University.

== Organisation and administration ==
There are more than 40,000 OSMU graduates in Russia and abroad, and there are more than 5,500 students studying in five faculties: medicine, pediatrics, preventive medicine, stomatology and pharmaceutics. The medical faculty (the school's oldest) was founded in 1920. Since 1997 OSMU has been headed by Alexander I. Novikov, MD, PhD, Professor and Academician of the International Academy of Advanced Sciences.

Scientists associated with OSMU include Raymond Achrem-Achremovich, Valentine Bisyarina, Peter Gorizontov, Vladimir Eliseev, Vladimir Pulkis, Leonid Maslov, Constantine Romodanovsky and Olga Sokolova-Ponomareva.

OSMU has relationships with educational institutions in Western Europe, the United States, Japan and other countries. The school consists of 59 departments.

The Student Scientific Society, with about 800 members, provides the basis for physician training.
