= Alexander Panychev =

Alexander Yurieyevich Panychev (Russian: Александр Юрьевич Панычев, born April 5, 1974) is a Russian railroad educator and rector of the Emperor Alexander I St. Petersburg State Transport University.

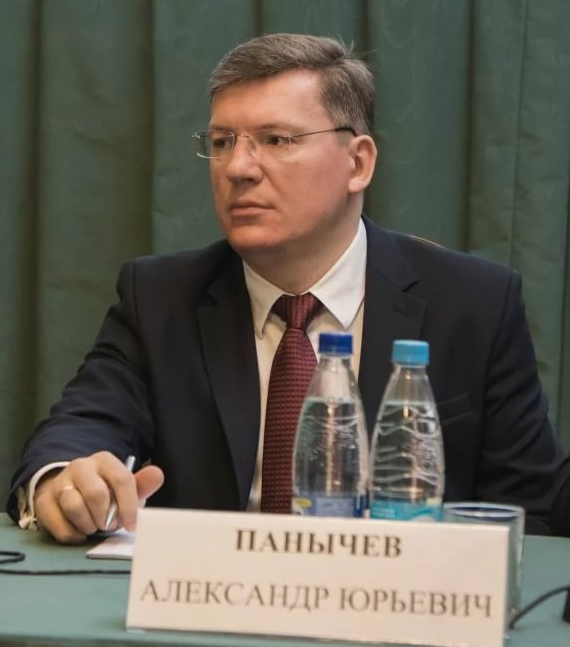
Aleksandr Yurevich Panychev

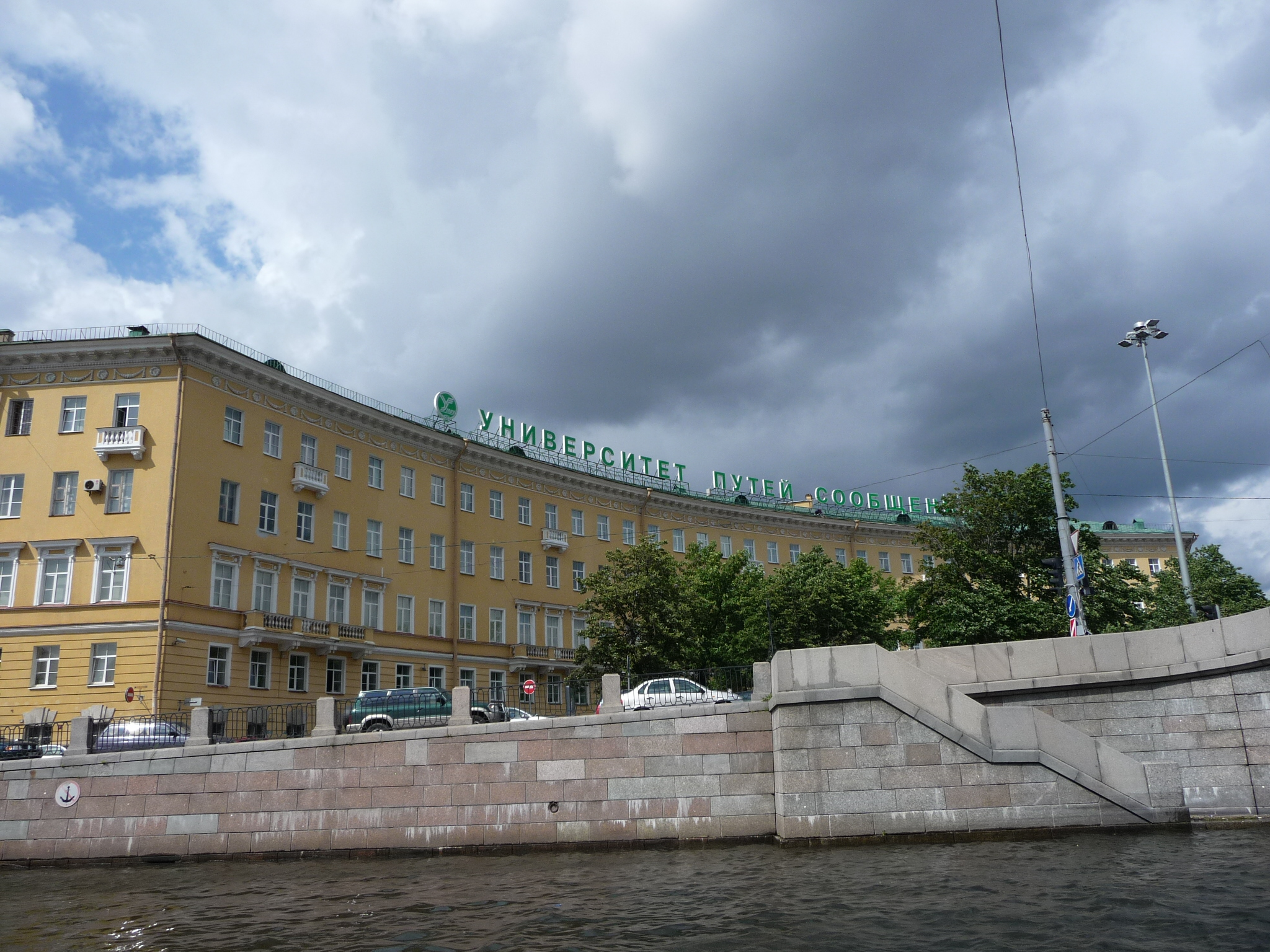
The building of “Emperor Alexander I St. Petersburg State Transport University” St. Petersburg State Transport University at the corner of Moskovsky prospect and Fontanka embankment, built in 1952 by architect V. I. Kuznetsov

== Early life ==
Panychev graduated from Omsk State University of Railway Engineering in 1998 with a degree in automation, telemechanics and communication in railway transport.

In 2001, he defended his Kandidat thesis, and in 2004 he received the title of associate professor. From 2000 to 2007 he worked at Omsk State University of Railway Engineering.

== Career ==
From January 2007 to April 2009, he was the head of the Department for Educational Institutions of the Federal Agency for Railway Transport, and from April 2009 to February 2010, he was the head of the Department of Educational Institutions and legal support of the Federal Agency for railway transport.

From February 2010 to June 2013, he worked as the rector of Omsk State Transport University.

Since July 2013, he has been the rector of the Emperor Alexander I St. Petersburg State Transport University.

== Research ==
Panychev has more than 70 scientific publications.

Panychev's PhD thesis on "Evaluation and forecasting of the effective use of material and energy resources in the structural units of railway transport" is devoted to the economic content of product quality and efficiency of the use of material and energy resources in railway transport. His later research examined the applied scientific field of optimization, evaluation and forecasting of supply and consumption of material and energy resources in the transport industry.

Panychev formed a scientific and pedagogical school for the detailed study of the economic assessment of the effectiveness of procurement processes in the holding "Russian Railways".

He is a curator based at the University scientific-educational center supporting innovative platforms such as the "Digital economy" program and national project "Science and education of Russia".

Panychev is the chairman of the organizing committees of the annual scientific events held by PGUPS, including:

- Betancourt International Engineering Forum
- International scientific-practical conference "Magnetocavitation Transport Systems and Technologies", supported by the International Council on magnetic levitation (The Maglev International Board)
- International scientific and practical conference "Technosphere and environmental safety in transport"
- International Symposium Eltrans
- International scientific-practical conference "Development of infrastructure and logistics technologies in transport systems"

The university has implemented projects for railway transport, including projects for the development of high-speed highways, including a joint meeting of the university and the Russian Railways company on the high-speed rail project.

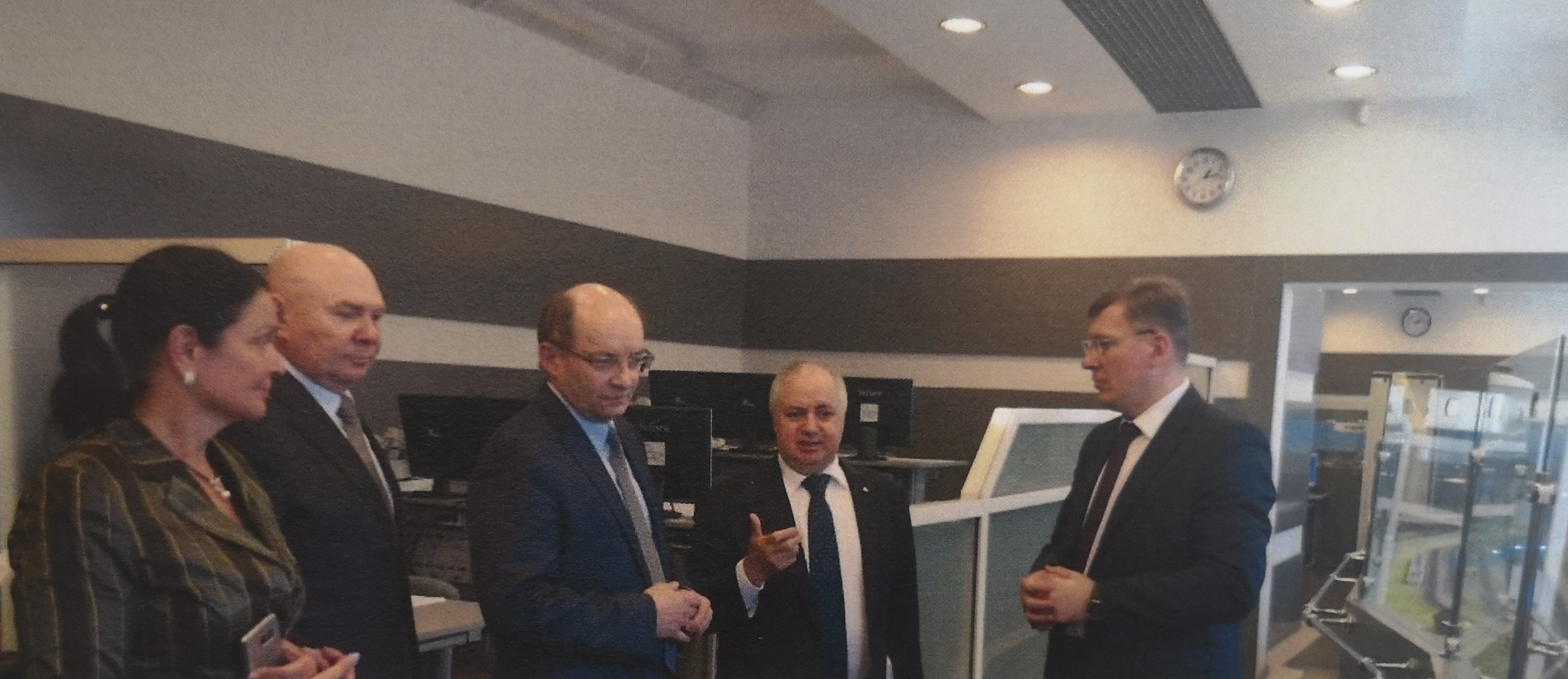
Joint meeting of the University and JSC "Russian Railways" on the high-speed highway project Moscow-Kazan

The University provides the training in the field of informational technologies, information security, communication, industrial and civil engineering, water supply and drainage, bridges and tunnels, rolling stock (locomotives, railways cars), power engineering, ecology, occupational safety, economics, transport operation, psychology. The obtained qualification allows the graduates to occupy the positions in state institutions and joint-stock companies.

— Alexander Yurieyevich Panychev

Every year the university holds a scientific conference. Panychev conducts roundtables and seminars with other scientists on improving railway transport and the introduction of innovative scientific developments of scientists of PGUPS in the main activity of the company "Russian Railways".
