= Omsk constituency =

Constituency of the State Duma of the Russian Federation

Omsk single-member constituency
- Constituency of the Russian State Duma

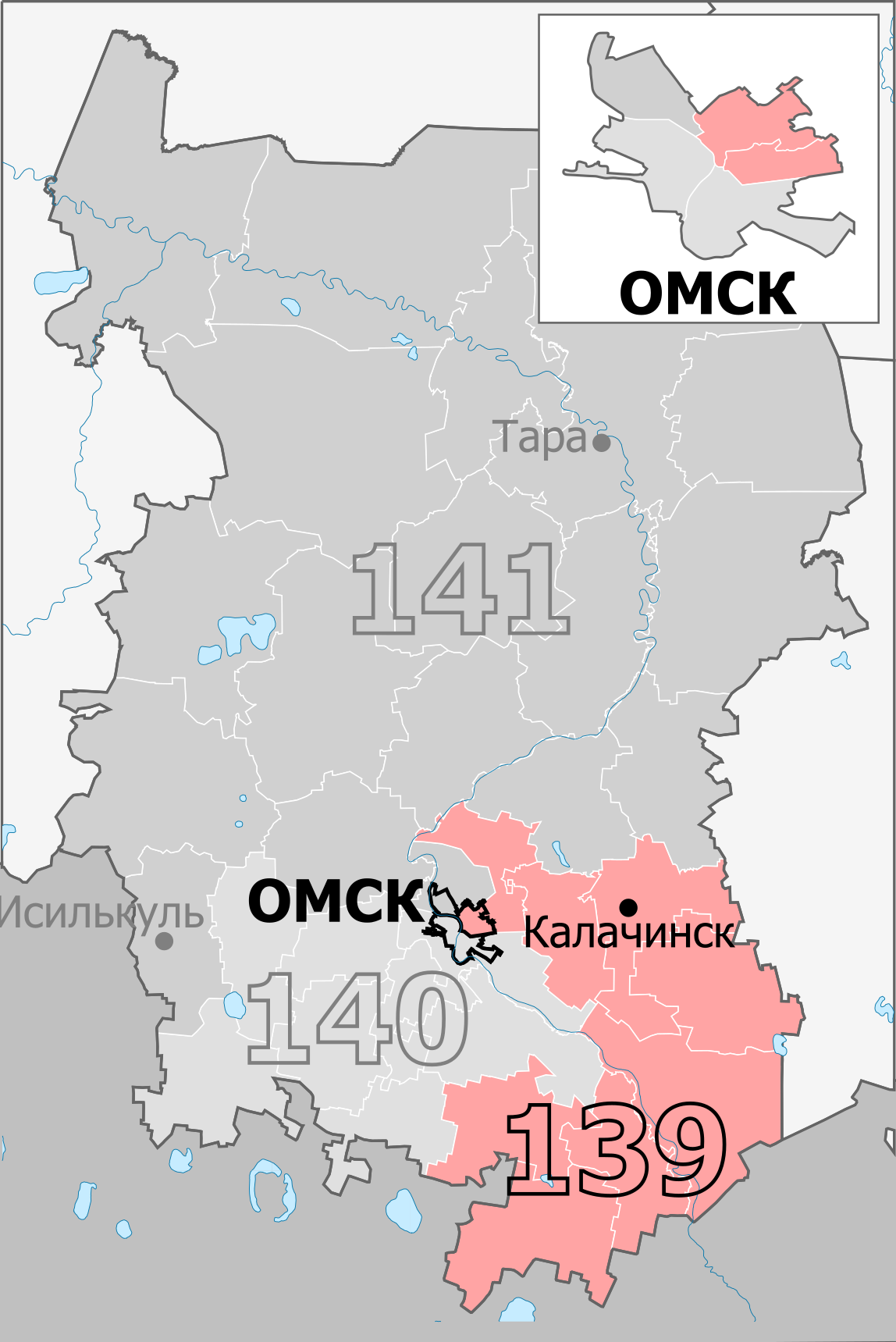
- Constituency boundaries since 2016
- Deputy: Dmitry Perminov; United Russia
- Federal subject: Omsk Oblast
- Districts: Cherlaksky, Kalachinsky, Kormilovsky, Novovarshavsky, Okoneshnikovsky, Omsk (Oktyabrsky, Tsentralny), Omsky (Andreyevskoye, Bogoslovskoye, Krasnoyarskoye, Petrovskoye, Pokrovskoye, Rostovkinskoye), Pavlogradsky, Russko-Polyansky
- Voters: 472,691 (2026)

The Omsk constituency (No.141 (Note: No.129 in 1993-2007, No.139 in 2016–2026)) is a Russian legislative constituency in Omsk Oblast. The constituency covers central and western Omsk as well as south-eastern Omsk Oblast.

The constituency has been represented since 2026 by United Russia deputy Dmitry Perminov, former Senator, State Duma member and Hero of Russia, who narrowly defeated one-term Communist incumbent Andrey Alekhin.

== Boundaries ==
1993–1995: Cherlaksky District, Kalachinsk, Kalachinsky District, Kormilovsky District, Okoneshnikovsky District, Omsk (Kirovsky, Leninsky), Omsky District, Tavrichesky District
The constituency covered southern Omsk, all of the city suburbs in Omsky District, completely surrounding Central constituency, as well as rural areas in south-eastern corner of Omsk Oblast.

1995–2003: Cherlaksky District, Kalachinsk, Kalachinsky District, Okoneshnikovsky District, Omsk (Kuybyshevsky, Leninsky, Oktyabrsky), Omsky District, Tavrichesky District
After the 1995 redistricting the constituency was significantly altered, losing Kormilovsky District to Bolsherechye constituency as well as swapping Kirovsky for Kuybyshevsky and Oktyabrsky city districts of Omsk with Central constituency.

2003–2007: Cherlaksky District, Kalachinsky District, Okoneshnikovsky District, Omsk (Kirovsky, Leninsky), Omsky District, Tavrichesky District
The constituency was again changed following the 2003 redistricting, regaining Kirovsky City District of Omsk from Central constituency in exchange for Oktyabrsky City District and the territory of former Kuybyshevsky City District (which was merged with Tsentralny district in 1997).

2016–present: Cherlaksky District, Kalachinsky District, Kormilovsky District, Novovarshavsky District, Okoneshnikovsky District, Omsk (Oktyabrsky, Tsentralny), Omsky District (Andreyevskoye, Bogoslovskoye, Krasnoyarskoye, Petrovskoye, Pokrovskoye, Rostovkinskoye), Pavlogradsky District, Russko-Polyansky District
The constituency was re-created for the 2016 election and retained south-eastern corner of Omsk Oblast and only northern and north-eastern suburbs of Omsk, losing its former portion of Omsk, southern suburbs and Tavrichesky District to new Moskalenki constituency, north-western Omsk suburbs – to Lyubinsky constituency. This seat instead took most of the former Central constituency (Oktyabrsky and Tsentralny city districts), rural Kormilovsky, Novovarshavsky, Pavlogradsky and Russko-Polyansky districts from the former Bolsherechye constituency.

== Members elected ==
Election	Member	Party
1993	Viktor Lotkov	Independent
1995	Oleg Smolin	Independent
1999	Oleg Smolin	Communist Party
2003	Oleg Smolin	Communist Party
2007	Proportional representation - no election by constituency	
2011	Proportional representation - no election by constituency	
2016	Viktor Schreider	United Russia
2021	Andrey Alekhin	Communist Party
2026	Dmitry Perminov	United Russia

== Election results ==
=== 1993 ===
Summary of the 12 December 1993 Russian legislative election in the Omsk constituency
Candidate	Party	Votes	%
Viktor Lotkov	Independent	109,935	41.22%
Yury Vinokurov	Independent	55,032	20.63%
Nikolay Kutorgin	Independent	42,170	15.81%
against all		41,572	15.59%
Total		266,700	100%

=== 1995 ===
Summary of the 17 December 1995 Russian legislative election in the Omsk constituency
Candidate	Party	Votes	%
Oleg Smolin	Independent	100,729	28.49%
Mikhail Poltoranin	Independent	51,796	14.65%
Vyacheslav Nikolyuk	Independent	45,749	12.94%
Mikhail Penkin	Communist Party	28,211	7.98%
Sergey Arbuzov	Pamfilova–Gurov–Lysenko	23,550	6.66%
Vladimir Ispravnikov	Independent	21,896	6.19%
Gennady Sidorov	Liberal Democratic Party	17,473	4.94%
Valentina Sokolova	Our Home – Russia	8,806	2.49%
Vladimir Vshivtsev	For the Motherland!	5,747	1.63%
Larisa Savelyeva	Independent	5,566	1.57%
Rafael Sharafutdinov	Nur	3,500	0.99%
Nikolay Afanasyev	Independent	2,680	0.76%
Konstantin Kharlamov	Russian All-People's Movement	1,310	0.37%
Aleksandr Tsalko	Transformation of the Fatherland	924	0.26%
against all		24,792	7.01%
Total		353,527	100%

=== 1999 ===
Results by district: Oleg Smolin: 30–40% 40–50%

Summary of the 19 December 1999 Russian legislative election in the Omsk constituency
Candidate	Party	Votes	%
Oleg Smolin (incumbent)	Communist Party	136,962	41.82%
Vladimir Lapin	Independent	67,607	20.64%
Vladimir Sedelnikov	Party of Pensioners	28,029	8.56%
Vladimir Dobrovolsky	Independent	23,763	7.26%
Andrey Avdeychikov	Independent	6,063	1.85%
Vyacheslav Rosinsky	Liberal Democratic Party	5,659	1.73%
Lyubov Neklyudova	Independent	5,468	1.67%
Eduard Smolyagin	Spiritual Heritage	5,186	1.58%
Sergey Mizya	Russian All-People's Union	4,401	1.34%
German Kozlovsky	Andrey Nikolayev and Svyatoslav Fyodorov Bloc	3,131	0.96%
Olga Maksakova	Independent	2,269	0.69%
against all		32,955	10.06%
Total		327,516	100%

=== 2003 ===
Results by district: Oleg Smolin: 40–50% 50–60%; Khabulda Shushubayev: 40–50%

Summary of the 7 December 2003 Russian legislative election in the Omsk constituency
Candidate	Party	Votes	%
Oleg Smolin (incumbent)	Communist Party	127,202	47.83%
Khabulda Shushubayev	Independent	54,866	20.63%
Vladimir Bolshakov	Liberal Democratic Party	18,450	6.94%
Dmitry Sheyko	Union of Right Forces	11,534	4.34%
Nikolay Salokhin	United Russian Party Rus'	8,325	3.13%
Sergey Tolmachev	Agrarian Party	8,008	3.01%
against all		33,683	12.67%
Total		266,048	100%

=== 2016 ===
Results by district: Viktor Schreider: 30–40% 40–50%; Andrey Alekhin: 30–40%

Summary of the 18 September 2016 Russian legislative election in the Omsk constituency
Candidate	Party	Votes	%
Viktor Schreider	United Russia	57,552	31.00%
Andrey Alekhin	Communist Party	56,021	30.17%
Aleksey Klepikov	Liberal Democratic Party	22,335	12.03%
Dmitry Gorovtsov	A Just Russia	15,516	8.36%
Tatyana Yeremenko	Party of Growth	6,699	3.61%
Aleksandr Barkov	Communists of Russia	6,422	3.46%
Sergey Kostarev	Yabloko	5,717	3.08%
Igor Basov	People's Freedom Party	3,347	1.80%
Nikolay Artemyev	Civic Platform	3,045	1.64%
Total		185,661	100%

=== 2021 ===
Results by district: Andrey Alekhin: 20–30% 30–40%; Stepan Bonkovsky: 30–40% 40–50%

Summary of the 17-19 September 2021 Russian legislative election in the Omsk constituency
Candidate	Party	Votes	%
Andrey Alekhin	Communist Party	61,631	31.68%
Stepan Bonkovsky	United Russia	53,087	27.29%
Natalya Tuzova	New People	15,439	7.94%
Viktor Zharkov	A Just Russia — For Truth	15,073	7.75%
Aleksey Baykov	Communists of Russia	13,797	7.09%
Gennady Pavlov	Party of Pensioners	10,069	5.18%
Anton Berendeyev	Liberal Democratic Party	9,723	5.00%
Tatyana Schneider	Yabloko	4,797	2.47%
Total		194,541	100%

=== 2026 ===
Summary of the 18-20 September 2026 Russian legislative election in the Omsk constituency
Candidate	Party	Votes	%
Dmitry Perminov	United Russia	59,900	29.97%
Andrey Alekhin (incumbent)	Communist Party	51,971	26.01%
Yury Lavrov	New People	17,014	8.51%
Maksim Makalenko	Liberal Democratic Party	13,042	6.53%
Anastasia Ivashova	Yabloko	11,155	5.58%
Aleksey Baykov	Communists of Russia	10,996	5.50%
Iosif Drobotenko	Party of Pensioners	10,373	5.19%
Vladimir Guseletov	A Just Russia	9,717	4.86%
Marina Kubareva	The Greens	4,513	2.26%
Total		199,848	100%
