= Omsk City Council =

Omsk City Council Омский городской Совет
- 7th convocation
- Coat of arms of Omsk

Leadership
- Speaker of the City Council: Vladimir Korbut

Structure
- Seats: 40
- Political groups: United Russia (35); A Just Russia (3); Communist Party of the Russian Federation (1); Independent (1)

Elections
- Last election: September 11, 2022

Meeting place
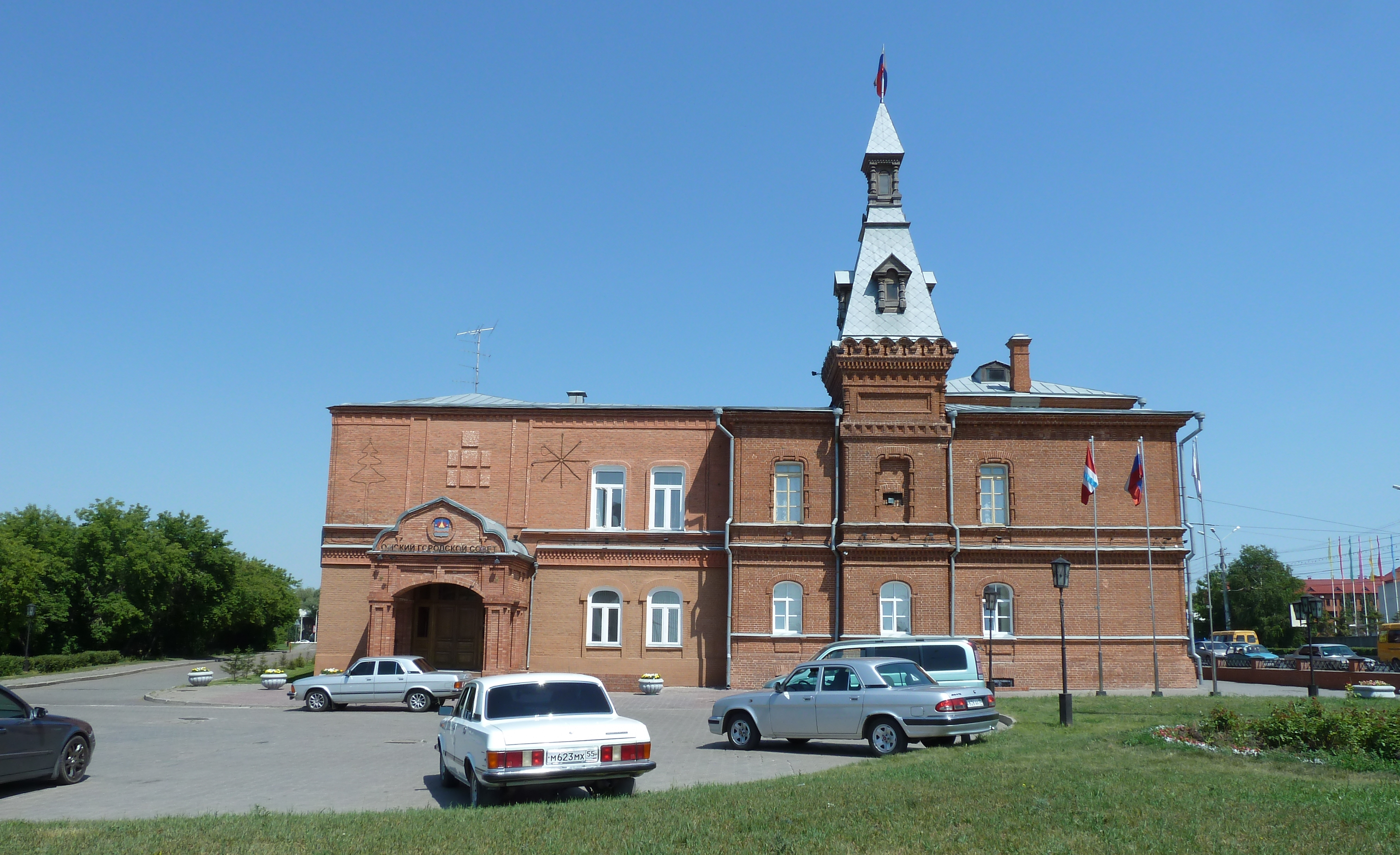
- Omsk City Council building, formerly the Pushkin Library

The Omsk City Council is the legislature of the city of Omsk. Deputies are elected for 5-year terms, with 40 elected from single-winner districts by majority vote. Until March 23, 2022, deputies were elected according to a mixed system where 20 deputies were elected from party list and 20 deputies were elected from single-winner districts. The current city council was elected on September 15, 2022.
