= Omsk Electromechanical Plant =

- Company type: Open Joint Stock Company
- Founded: 1958
- Headquarters: Omsk, Russia
- Website: www.oemz.ru

Omsk Electromechanical Plant (Russian: Омский электромеханический завод) is a company based in Omsk, Russia.

Founded in 1958, the Omsk Electromechanical Plant was originally an anchor company of the Ministry of Power Engineering and Electrification of Russia. The plant has specialized in electronic equipment for space and missile systems. In the early 1990s the plant has converted from military to civil production, with the result that its space- and defense-related business had reportedly declined to around 15 percent by early 1992.

As of September 1993, the plant was a state-owned enterprise; however, since 1993, it has been a joint-stock company.

== Products ==
The plant has offered the following civilian products:

- Inclination-turning tables for testing gyroscopic items;
- low-frequency ultrasonic and electro-magnetic medical instruments;
- components for metal-working equipment;
- salting machines for meat processing; dough-kneading machines;
- electro-stimulators for farm animals;
- modems;
- stepping motors;
- automobile and household vacuum cleaners;
- table toys for children;
- "Mercury" stereo systems;
- tape recorders;
- household cooking equipment.

The plant has also offered the following military products:

- Electronic and electromechanical components for spacecraft guidance systems,
- ballistic missile components.

== Management ==
General Director — Rasim Nasirovich Galyamov

== Partners ==
OJSC "MRSK of Siberia"

OJSC AK "Omskenergo"

OJSC "Mosenergo"

OJSC "Kolenergo"

OJSC "Kuzbassenergo"

OJSC "Tyumenenergo"

OJSC "Novatek"

OJSC "Oil and Gas Company SLAVNEFT"

CJSC "Lukoil — Neftegazstroy"

OJSC "Gazprom"

OJSC AK "Transneft"

OJSC "TNK-BP"

OJSC "NK Rosneft"
