= Rostovka, Omsky District, Omsk Oblast =

Rural locality in Omsk Oblast, Russia

Coordinates: 55°01′09″N 73°35′22″E

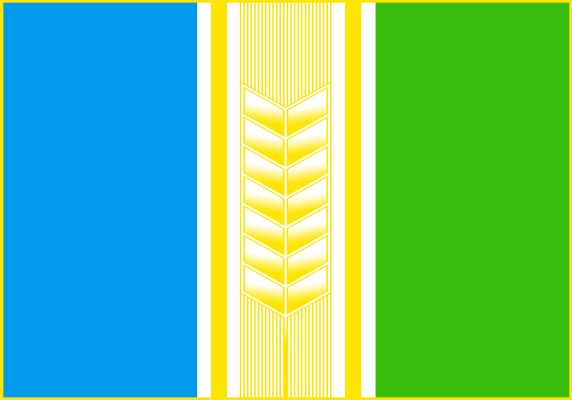
Flag of Rostovka

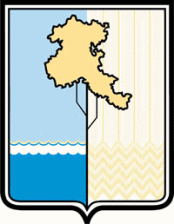
Coat of arms of Rostovka

Rostovka (Russian: Ростовка) is a rural locality (a settlement) and the administrative center of Omsky District, Omsk Oblast, Russia. Population: 5,468 (2010 census); 5,489 (2002 census);
