= Moskalenki constituency =

Moskalenki single-member constituency
- Constituency of the Russian State Duma

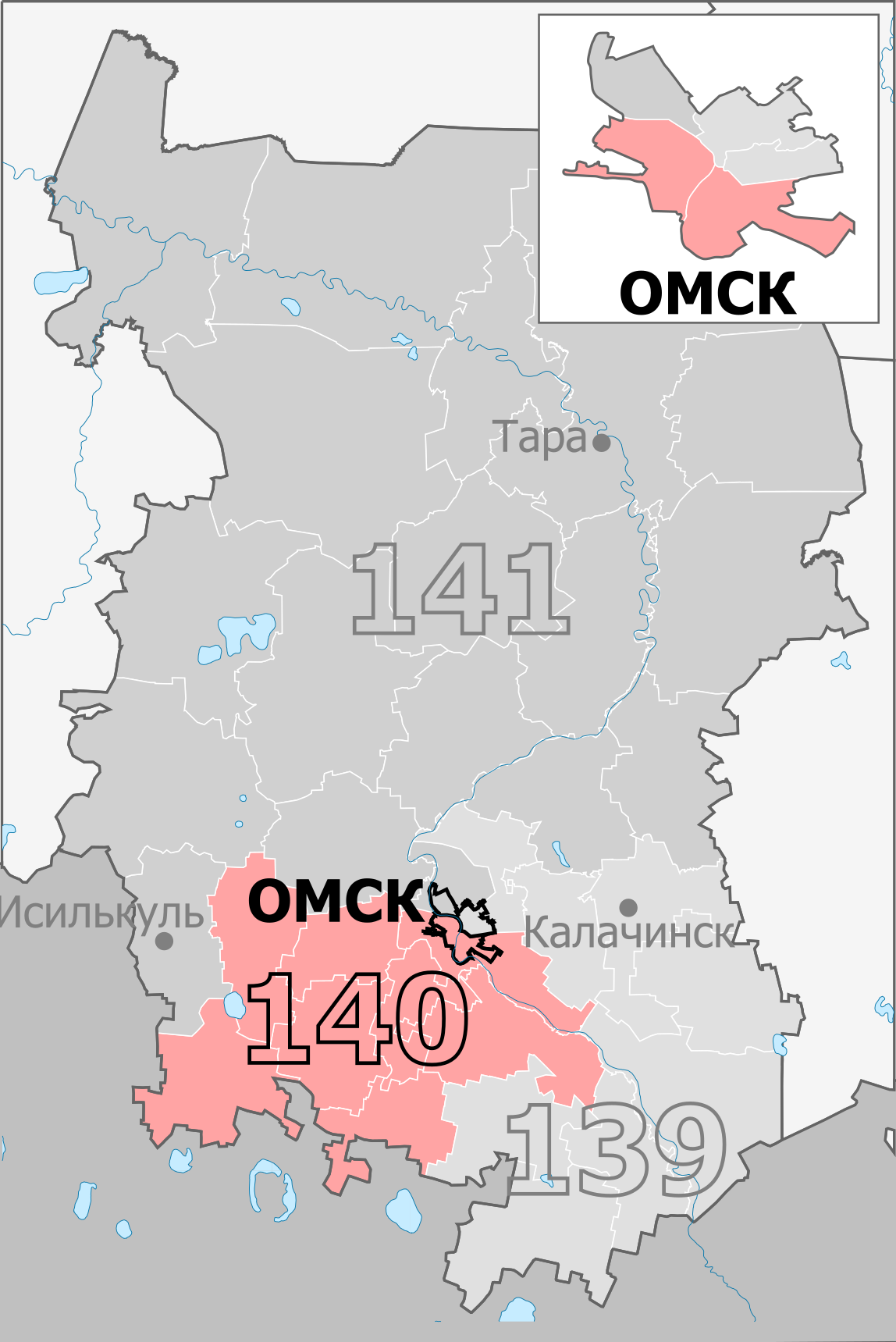
- Constituency boundaries since 2016
- Deputy: Oleg Smolin; Communist Party
- Federal subject: Omsk Oblast
- Districts: Azovsky Nemetsky, Maryanovsky, Moskalensky, Odessky, Omsk (Kirovsky, Leninsky), Omsky (Achairskoye, Irtyshskoye, Kalininskoye, Komsomolskoye, Luzinskoye, Magistralnoye, Morozovskoye, Novoomskoye, Rozovskoye, Troitskoye, Ust-Zaostrovkoye), Poltavsky, Sherbakulsky, Tavrichesky
- Voters: 506,371 (2026)

The Moskalenki constituency (No.142 (Note: No.140 in 2016–2026)) is a Russian legislative constituency in Omsk Oblast. The constituency covers southern Omsk and south-western Omsk Oblast.

The constituency has been represented since 2016 by Communist deputy Oleg Smolin, eight-term State Duma member, scientific communism professor and former Senator.

== Boundaries ==
2016–present: Azovsky Nemetsky National District, Maryanovsky District, Moskalensky District, Odessky District, Omsk (Kirovsky, Leninsky), Omsky District (Achairskoye, Irtyshskoye, Kalininskoye, Komsomolskoye, Luzinskoye, Magistralnoye, Morozovskoye, Novoomskoye, Rozovskoye, Troitskoye, Ust-Zaostrovkoye), Poltavsky District, Sherbakulsky District, Tavrichesky District
The constituency was created for the 2016 election from southern Omsk, its southern suburbs and exurbs portion of Omsk constituency as well as rural south-western Omsk Oblast from the former Bolsherechye constituency.

== Members elected ==
Election	Member	Party
2016	Oleg Smolin	Communist Party
2021	Oleg Smolin	Communist Party
2026	Oleg Smolin	Communist Party

== Election results ==
=== 2016 ===
Summary of the 18 September 2016 Russian legislative election in the Moskalenki constituency
Candidate	Party	Votes	%
Oleg Smolin	Communist Party	87,848	44.76%
Yevgeny Dubovsky	A Just Russia	28,947	14.75%
Kirill Atamanichenko	Liberal Democratic Party	27,735	14.13%
Vladimir Zhukov	Communists of Russia	20,466	10.43%
Tatyana Ogarkova	Party of Growth	9,021	4.60%
Sergey Astashenko	People's Freedom Party	4,647	2.37%
Oleg Kurnyavko	Civic Platform	4,621	2.35%
Total		196,269	100%

=== 2021 ===
Summary of the 17-19 September 2021 Russian legislative election in the Moskalenki constituency
Candidate	Party	Votes	%
Oleg Smolin (incumbent)	Communist Party	85,262	42.94%
Kirill Mandrygin	United Russia	38,392	19.34%
Svetlana Andrushko	Communists of Russia	20,451	10.30%
Nikolay Biryukov	New People	18,308	9.22%
Kirill Atamanichenko	Liberal Democratic Party	11,338	5.71%
Iosif Drobotenko	Party of Pensioners	10,291	5.18%
Dmitry Perevalsky	Yabloko	3,598	1.81%
Total		198,546	100%

=== 2026 ===
Summary of the 18-20 September 2026 Russian legislative election in the Moskalenki constituency
Candidate	Party	Votes	%
Oleg Smolin (incumbent)	Communist Party	70,996	32.31%
Andrey Bondarenko	United Russia	70,040	31.87%
Kirill Atamanichenko	Liberal Democratic Party	18,601	8.46%
Natalya Tuzova	New People	17,813	8.11%
Tatyana Schneider	Yabloko	11,841	5.39%
Andrey Kaplya	Party of Pensioners	9,264	4.22%
Viktor Zharkov	Communists of Russia	8,917	4.06%
Total		219,754	100%
