= Oleg Smolin =

Russian politician and philosopher

- Олег Смолин
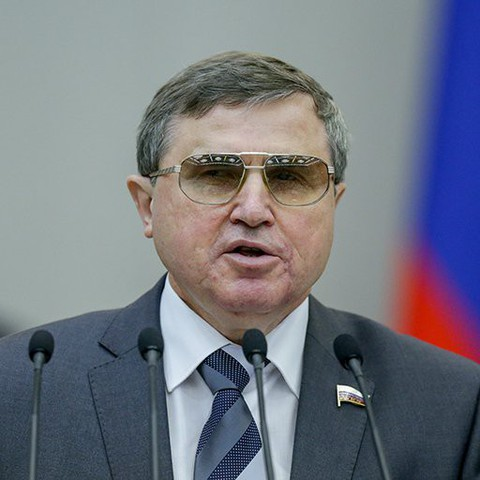

Member of the State Duma for Omsk Oblast
- Incumbent
- Assumed office 5 October 2016
- Preceded by: Constituency established
- Constituency: Moskalenki (No. 140)
- In office 17 January 1996 – 24 December 2007
- Constituency: Omsk (No. 129) (Note: Omsk has been constituency No. 139 since 2016)

Member of the State Duma (Party List Seat)
- In office 24 December 2007 – 5 October 2016

Personal details
- Born: 10 February 1952 (age 74) Poludino, Magzhan Zhumabayev District, North Kazakhstan Region, Kazakh SSR, Soviet Union
- Party: CPRF
- Education: Omsk State Pedagogical University; Ural State University

Oleg Nikolayevich Smolin (Russian: Оле́г Никола́евич Смо́лин; born 10 February 1952) is a Russian politician. He is a State Duma deputy, as a member of the Communist Party. He is blind, and was the vice president of the Russian Paralympic committee.

He was the only member of the State Duma who voted against the recognition of the separatist Lugansk People's Republic. But he then stated that he made a mistake when casting his vote, and asked to correct the vote tally.

However, he later said that he was "shocked" by the invasion and express that "military force should be used in politics only as a last resort"
