= Rostovka, Vologda Oblast =

Rostovka Ростовка
- Village
- Location within Vologda Oblast Location within Russia
- Coordinates: 59°27′N 40°01′E
- Country: Russia
- Region: Vologda Oblast
- District: Sokolsky District
- Time zone: UTC+3:00

Rostovka (Russian: Ростовка) is a rural locality (a village) in Borovetskoye Rural Settlement, Sokolsky District, Vologda Oblast, Russia. The population was 15 as of 2002.

== Geography ==
Rostovka is located 6 km west of Sokol (the district's administrative centre) by road. Pyatino is the nearest rural locality.
