= Dmitry Perminov =

Russian politician

- Дмитрий Перминов
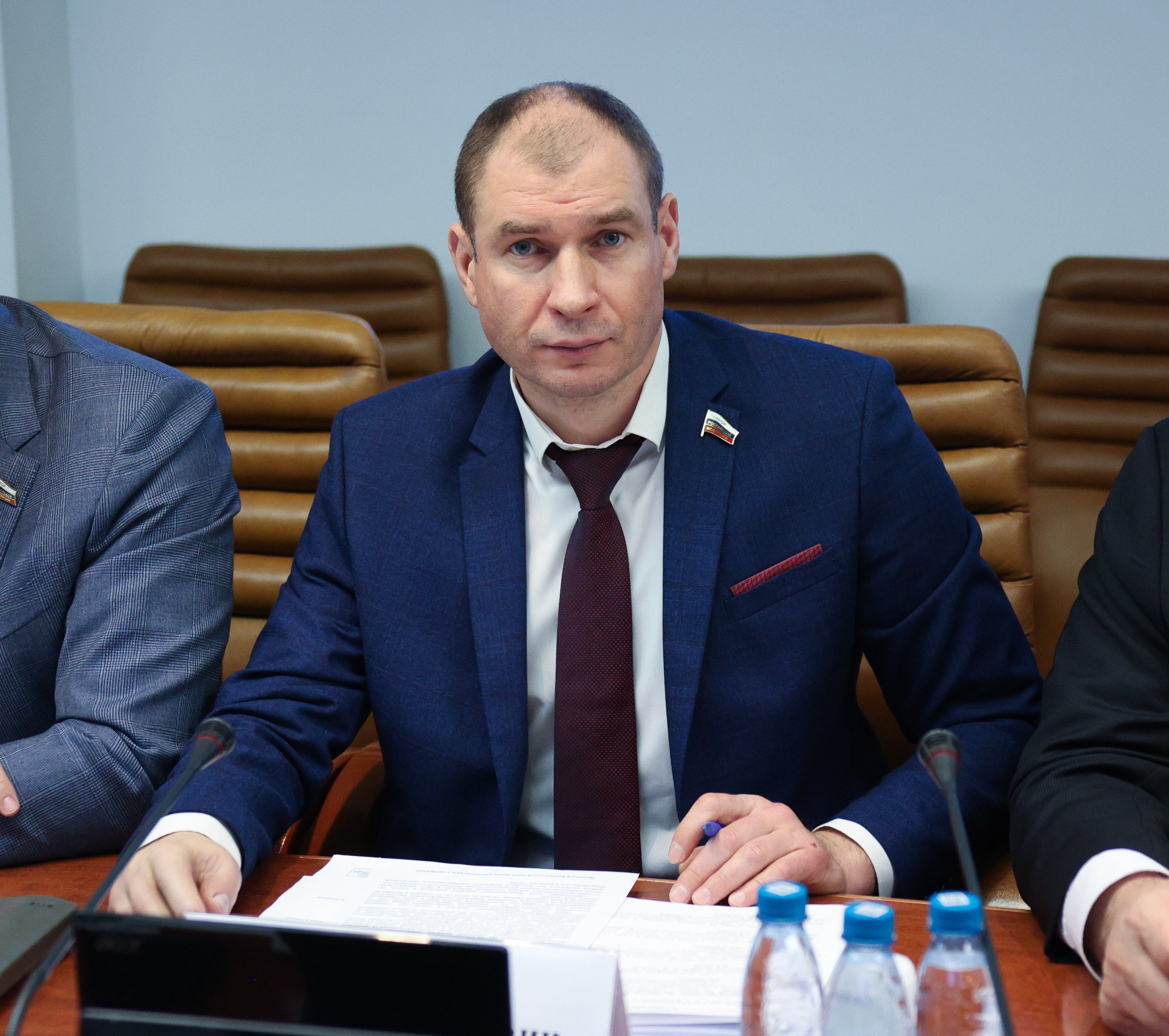
- Perminov in 2024

Russian Federation Senator from Omsk Oblast
- Incumbent
- Assumed office 29 September 2021
- Preceded by: Viktor Nazarov

Member of the State Duma
- In office 5 October 2016 – 29 September 2021

Deputy of the Legislative Assembly of Omsk Oblast
- In office 11 March 2007 – 5 October 2016

Personal details
- Born: Dmitry Sergeyevich Perminov; 3 April 1979 (age 47) Omsk, Soviet Union
- Party: United Russia
- Awards: Hero of the Russian Federation

Dmitry Sergeyevich Perminov (Russian: Дмитрий Сергеевич Перминов; born 3 April 1979) is a Russian politician and former army officer who is currently one of the two senators from Omsk Oblast in the Federation Council since 29 September 2021.

Perminov had formerly served as a deputy of the State Duma's VII convocation from 2016 to 2021. He was awarded the title of Hero of the Russian Federation in 1999.

== Biography ==
Dmitry Perminov was born on 3 April 1979 in Omsk. He received a certificate of secondary education in 1994, and in the same year he entered the Omsk technical school of railway transport. Upon graduation in 1998, he received the specialty of an electric locomotive driver and was called up for military service in the ranks of the Russian Army. He served in military intelligence units in Volgograd Oblast. In 1999, Perminov took part in the War of Dagestan.

On 29 August 1999, in front of the company of the 22nd Separate Operational Brigade (22nd defense), which included the sniper of the intelligence company 22nd defense of the North Caucasian Federal District of the Internal Troops of the Ministry of Internal Affairs (MVD), the task was to capture Mount Chaban in Buynaksky District, the area where the militants had a radio repeater. A group of scouts took the height in battle and with losses, with M. Yu. Solodovnikov was seriously wounded, later died of his wounds in the hospital without regaining consciousness. The militants, deciding to recapture it, encircled the company, with an approximately 10-fold advantage (2 detachments, detachments of Hottab and Basayev, took part in the assault on the height from the side of the militants) rushed to the assault in manpower. Eight scouts in one trench, in one of the directions of the all-round defense, the heights took up defensive positions. And Perminov suddenly saw that an F-1 grenade fell on the back of one of his comrades. He grabbed it and threw it over the parapet. Only after the explosion did he realize that his right hand had been torn off, by his act he saved his comrades, who were with him in a hastily dug trench. Wounded, he continued to hold the line. When there was no longer any hope of escaping from the height alive, a special forces detachment "Rus" came to the rescue.

By Decree of the President of Russia No. 1418 of 22 October 1999, for courage and heroism shown during the counter-terrorist operation in the North Caucasus, Private Perminov was awarded the title of Hero of the Russian Federation with a special distinction badge - the Gold Star medal (No. 499)

In 2000, Perminov entered the Omsk Academy of the Ministry of Internal Affairs of Russia. He graduated from the academy in 2004, and had stayed to work at the department of civil law disciplines as a teacher. In 2006 he passed the candidate minimum and entered the postgraduate course. In the same year he became the chairman of the board of the Omsk regional public organization of Heroes of the Soviet Union, Heroes of Russia, full holders of the Order of Glory "Star" (OROO of Heroes "Zvezda").

On 11 March 2007, Perminov was elected to the Legislative Assembly of Omsk Oblast. He became one of the youngest Omsk parliamentarians, and has worked in the committee on legislation. In 2008, Perminov headed the Council of the regional organization "Public Coalition of Omsk Oblast".

On 5 October 2016, Perminov became a deputy of the State Duma's seventh convocation. He was the member of the Security and Anti-Corruption Committee. On 29 September 2021, Perminov became one of the two senators from Omsk Oblast in the Federation Council.

=== Sanctions ===
He was sanctioned by the UK government in 2022 in relation to the Russo-Ukrainian War.

== Legislative activity ==
From 2016 to 2019, during the term of office of a deputy of the State Duma of the VII convocation, Perminov co-authored 50 legislative initiatives and amendments to draft federal laws.

== See also ==
- List of Heroes of the Russian Federation
