= Oksana Fadina =

Russian politician (born 1976)

- Оксана Фадина
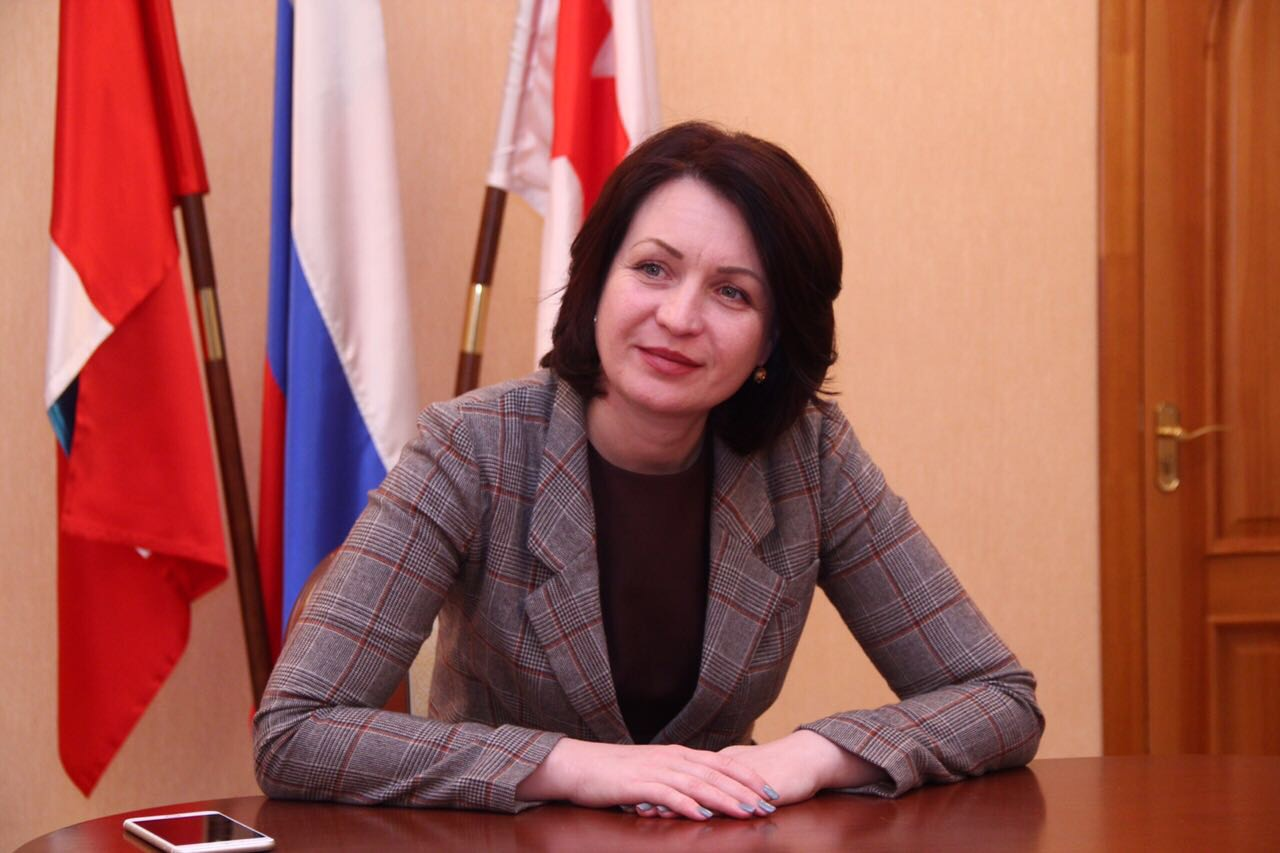

Member of the State Duma for Omsk Oblast
- Incumbent
- Assumed office 12 October 2021
- Preceded by: Andrey Golushko
- Constituency: Lyubinsky (No. 141)

Mayor of Omsk
- In office 8 December 2017 – September 2021

Minister of Economy of the Omsk Region
- In office 30 October 2015 – 8 December 2021

Personal details
- Born: 3 July 1976 (age 50) Bolsherechye, Omsk Oblast, Russian SFSR, Soviet Union
- Party: United Russia
- Education: Institute of Economics and Finance Omsk State Agrarian University

Oksana Nikolaevna Fadina (Russian: Оксана Николаевна Фадина; born 3 July 1976, Bolsherechye, Omsk Oblast) is a Russian politician and a deputy of the 8th State Duma.

In 2006 she was awarded a Doctor of Sciences degree in economics. The same year she was appointed the head of the sector of economic analysis and financial planning of the Ministry of Oil Processing of the Omsk oblast (liquidated in 2008). On 18 July 2012 she was appointed Deputy Minister of Economy of the Omsk Region. She left the post in 2013 to become the deputy director of Omskgorgaz. In 2015 she returned to the civil service and became the First Deputy Minister of Economy of the Omsk Region. On 30 October 2015 she became the Minister of Economy of the Omsk Region. In 2017 she was elected the Mayor of Omsk. She left the post in 2021 to become a deputy of the 8th State Duma.

== Sanctions ==
She was sanctioned by the UK government in 2022 in relation to the Russo-Ukrainian War.

== Family ==
She was married twice — to Sergey Ivakhnenko and Yuri Fadin. Both marriages ended in divorce (after the second, she kept her husband’s surname), and no children were born from them.

In 2018, the mayor adopted a child — a daughter named Eva. Fadina took the girl from an orphanage when she was about six months old.
