= Vitaliy Khotsenko =

Ukrainian-born Russian politician

- Виталий Хоценко
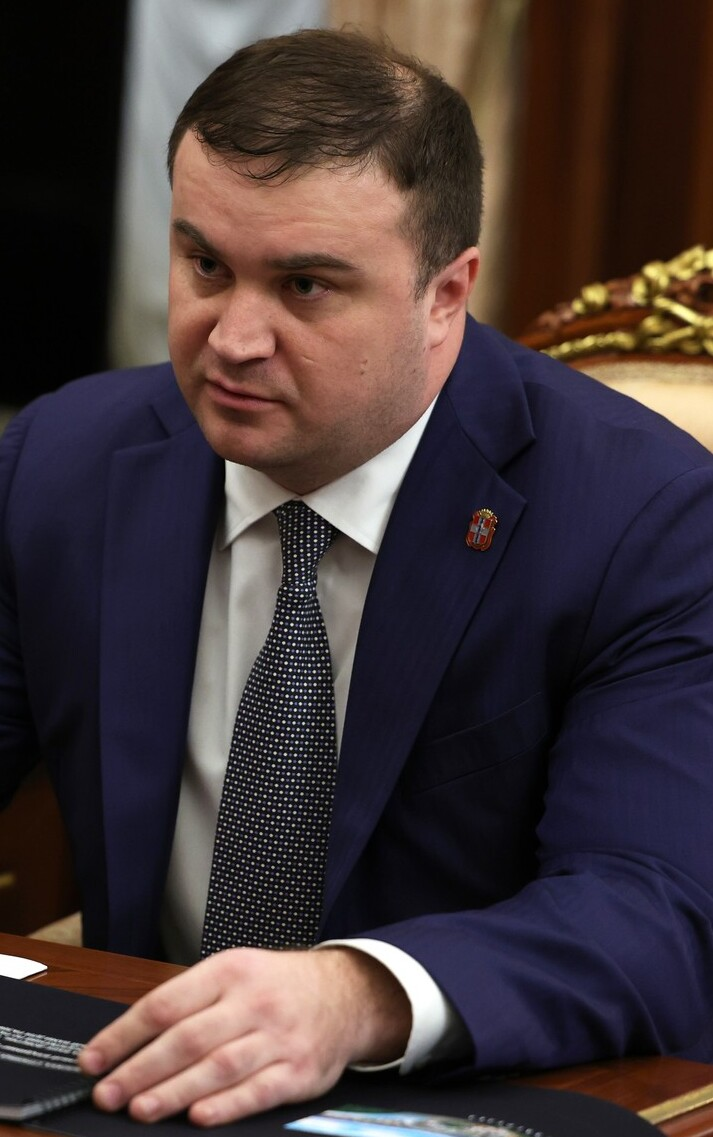
- Khotsenko in 2025

4th Governor of Omsk Oblast
- Incumbent
- Assumed office 29 March 2023
- Preceded by: Alexander Burkov

Prime Minister of the Donetsk People's Republic
- In office 8 June 2022 – 29 March 2023
- President: Denis Pushilin
- Preceded by: Alexander Ananchenko
- Succeeded by: Yevgeny Solntsev

Minister of Energy of Stavropol Krai
- In office 16 December 2013 – 12 September 2019

Head of the Science and Innovation Department of Yamalo-Nenets
- In office 2010–2013

Head of the Analysis and Forecasting Department of Yamalo-Nenets
- In office 2008–2010

Personal details
- Born: 18 March 1986 (age 40) Dnipropetrovsk, Ukrainian SSR, Soviet Union
- Education: Moscow State University; Russian Presidential Academy of National Economy and Public Administration

Vitaliy Pavlovich Khotsenko (Russian: Виталий Павлович Хоценко; born 18 March 1986) is a Ukrainian-born Russian politician, who serves as Governor of Omsk Oblast since September 2023 (Acting Governor since March 2023). He had previously held several statewide positions in Stavropol Krai, Yamalo-Nenets Autonomous Okrug and the Donetsk People's Republic.

== Biography ==
=== Early life ===
Khotsenko was born on 18 March 1986 in Dnipropetrovsk (now known as Dnipro). His father, Pavel Vitalyevich Khotsenko, led the Organized Crime department of the Ministry of Internal Affairs in Yamalo-Nenets Autonomous Okrug. In addition, he led the directorate of a hotel complex in Novy Urengoy and of the Sochi National Park.

Khotsenko graduated from the Faculty of Sociology in Moscow State University, from the Singapore Institute of Marketing with a degree in Business Management and from the Specialized Institute of Jurisprudence with a degree in the field. He also graduated from the Russian Presidential Academy of National Economy and Public Administration with a master's degree in State regulation of the Economy, as well as postgraduate studies at Moscow State University. After training in the military department of Moscow State University, Khotsenko attained the rank of Lieutenant. He is also fluent in English.

=== Political career ===
Khotsenko first worked as an assistant to a member of the Civic Chamber of the Russian Federation. According to local media, his rapid promotion was related to his father's connections in the Yamalo-Nenets Autonomous Okrug. From 2008 to 2010, Khotsenko worked as the head of the analysis and forecasting department of the Yamalo-Nenets Okrug. From March 2010, he worked as the Director of the department of Science and Innovation in the Okrug, as an assistant, as the expert adviser to the Okrug's first deputy governor, and as a supervisor of Industry, Fuel, Energy, and Natural Resources.

On 16 December 2013, Khotsenko was appointed Minister of Energy, Industry and Communications of Stavropol Krai. On September 12, 2019, Khotsenko became the Director of the Department of Industrial Policy and Project Management in the Russian Ministry of Industry and Trade.

On 8 June 2022, the People's Council of the Donetsk People's Republic approved Khotsenko's candidacy for the position of Prime Minister of the Donetsk People's Republic. That day, Khotsenko was appointed to the position by the Head of the Donetsk People's Republic, Denis Pushilin.

On 21 December 2022, Khotsenko was injured by shelling along with Dmitry Rogozin in Donetsk; the attack killed two people according to DPR head Denis Pushilin, while Ukraine's border service confirmed that the Ukrainian military perpetrated the attack.

On 29 March 2023, he was appointed acting Governor of Omsk Oblast.

On 22 April 2023, Andrei Turchak, secretary of the United Russia General Council, said that Khotsenko will become the party's candidate for the Omsk Region gubernatorial election in 2023.

On 22 September 2023, Khotsenko has officially taken office.

=== Sanctions ===
Khotsenko was sanctioned by the US Treasury and the United Kingdom in 2022 following the Russian invasion of Ukraine.

== Awards ==
Khotsenko's awards include:

- Medal of the Order "For Merit to the Fatherland" II class (2022)
- Order of Honour (2023)
