= Omsky District =

Omsky District Омский район (Russian)
- District
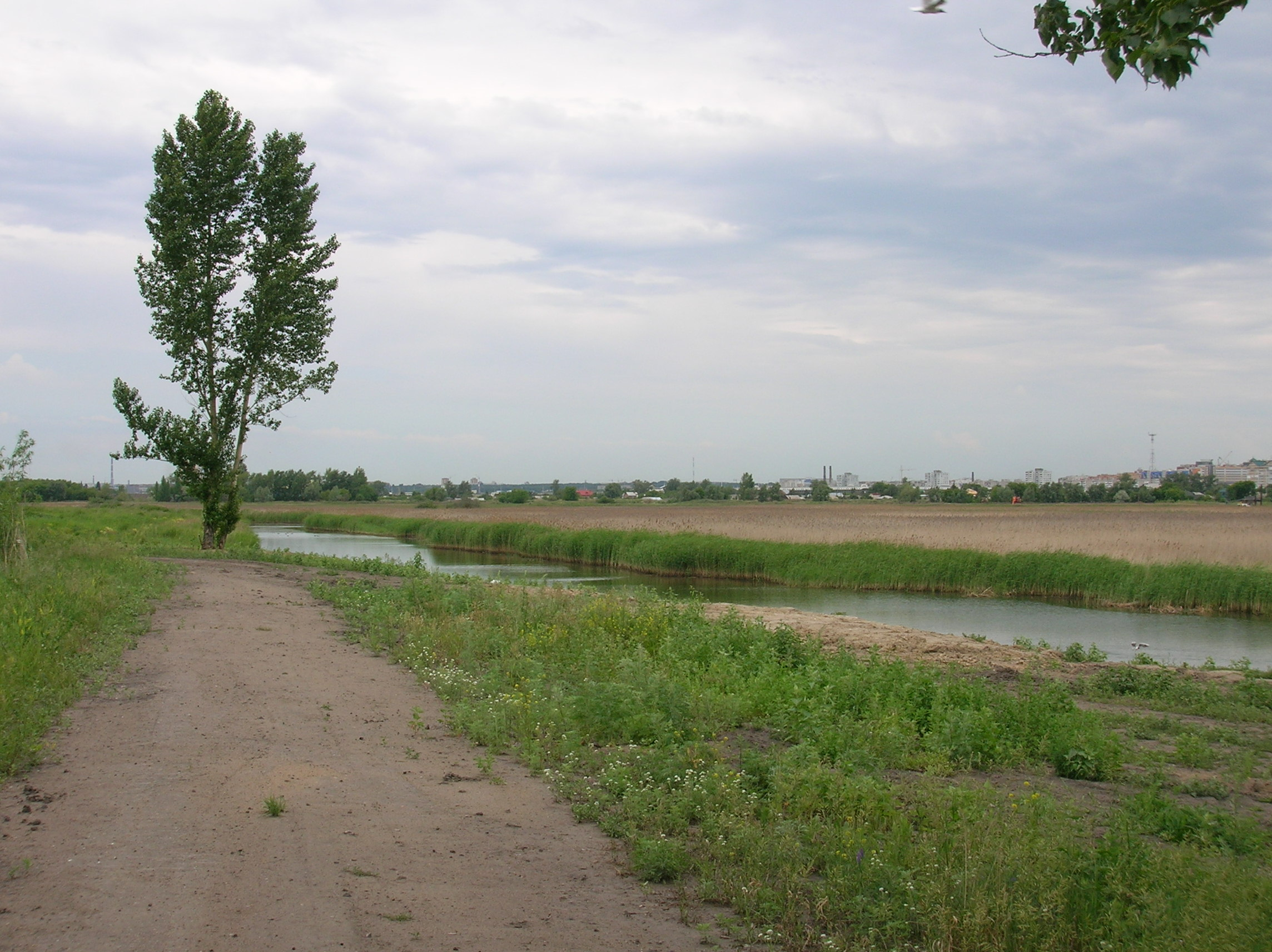
- Nature park "Ptichya-Gavan", Omsky District

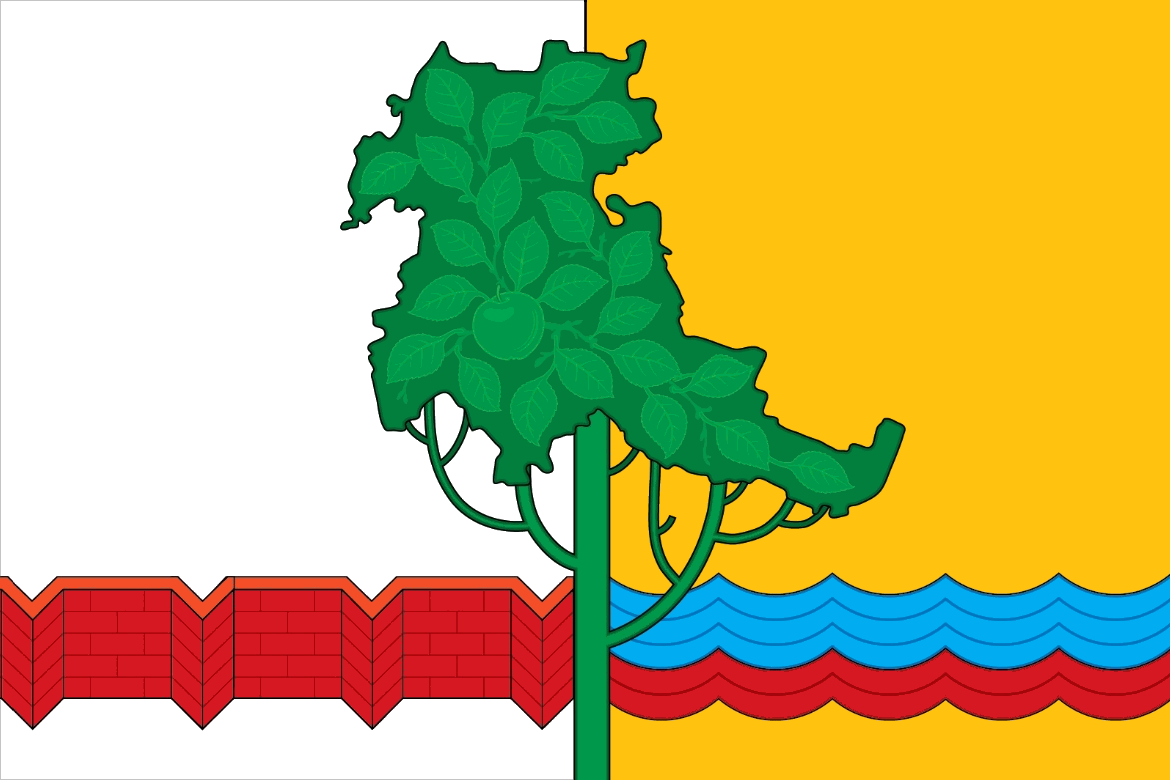
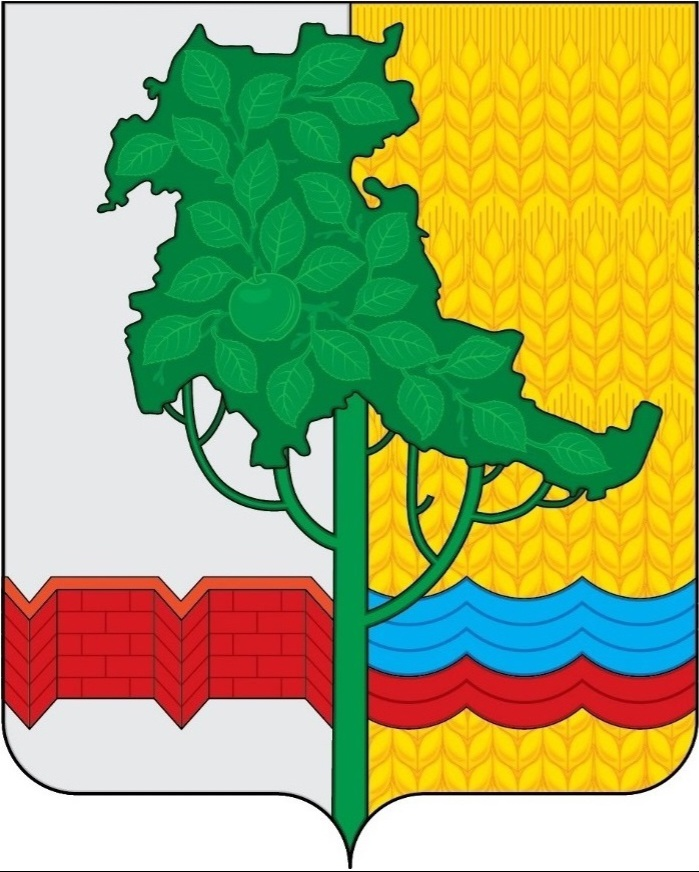
- Flag Coat of arms
- Location of Omsky District in Omsk Oblast
- Coordinates: 54°58′N 73°23′E
- Country: Russia
- Federal subject: Omsk Oblast
- Established: 17 July 1929
- Administrative center: Rostovka

Area
  - Total: 3,600 km^{2} (1,400 sq mi)

Population (2010 Census)
  - Total: 94,086
  - Density: 26/km^{2} (68/sq mi)
  - Urban: 1.8%
  - Rural: 98.2%

Administrative structure
  - Administrative divisions: 1 Suburban settlements, 23 Rural okrugs
  - Inhabited localities: 1 urban-type settlements, 93 rural localities

Municipal structure
  - Municipally incorporated as: Omsky Municipal District
  - Municipal divisions: 1 urban settlements, 23 rural settlements
- Time zone: UTC+6 (MSK+3)
- OKTMO ID: 52644000
- Website: http://омскийрайон.рф

Omsky District (Russian: О́мский райо́н) is an administrative and municipal district (raion), one of the thirty-two in Omsk Oblast, Russia. It is located in the southern central part of the oblast. The area of the district is 3,600 square kilometers (1,400 sq mi). Its administrative center is the rural locality (a settlement) of Rostovka. Population: 94,086 (2010 Census); 94,251 (2002 census); 90,461 (1989 Soviet census). The population of Rostovka accounts for 5.8% of the district's total population.
