= Legislative Assembly of Omsk Oblast =

Regional parliament of Omsk Oblast, Russia

Legislative Assembly of Omsk Oblast Законодательное собрание Омской области
- 7th legislature

Type
- Type: Unicameral

Leadership
- Chairman: Vladimir Varnavsky, United Russia since 12 April 1994

Structure
- Seats: 44
- Political groups: United Russia (26) CPRF (10); CR (3); NP (2); SRZP (2) LDPR (1)

Elections
- Voting system: Mixed
- Last election: 19 September 2021
- Next election: 2026

Meeting place
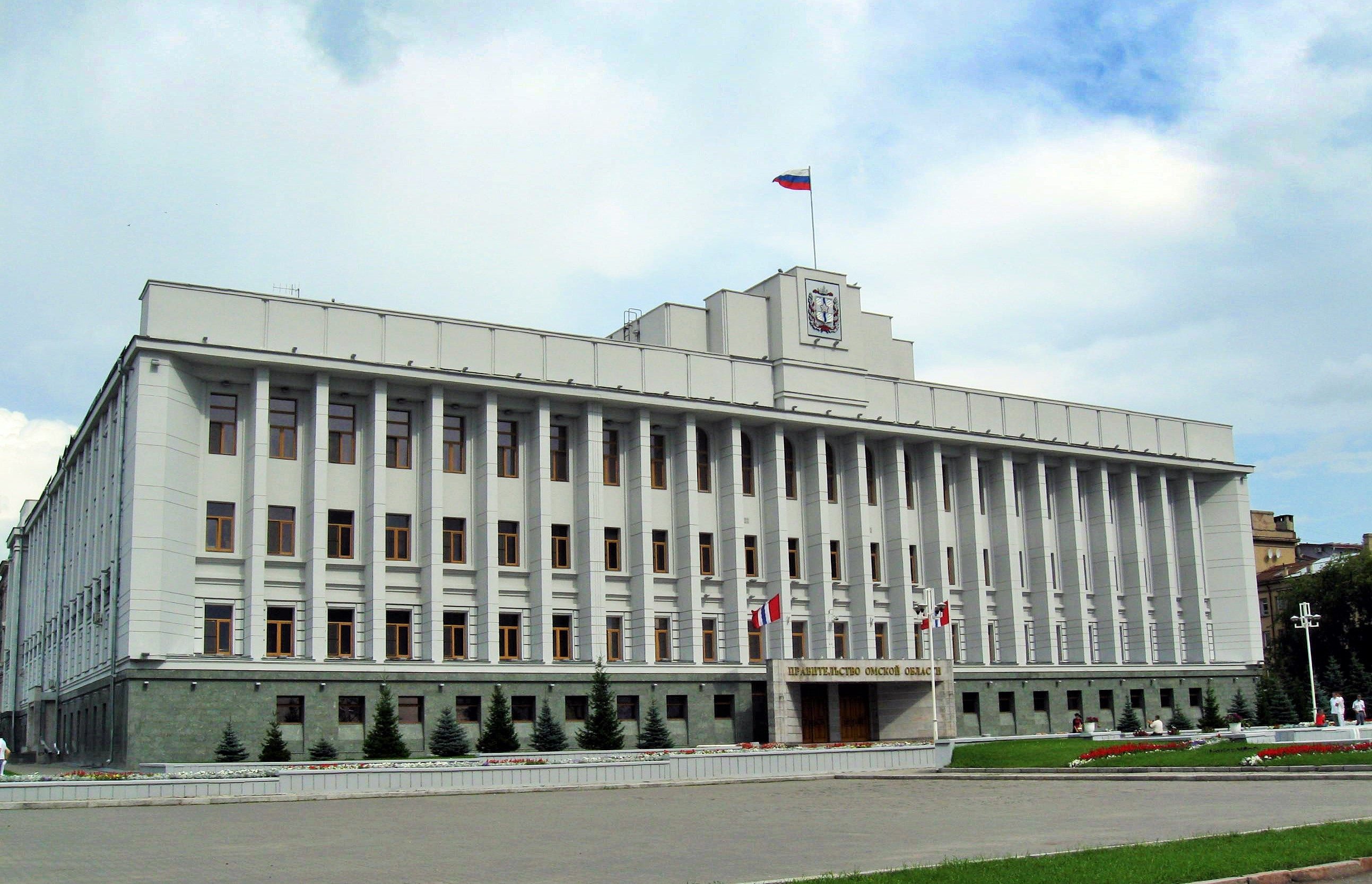
- Ulitsa Krasnyy Put', 1, Omsk

Website
- omsk-parlament.ru

The Legislative Assembly of Omsk Oblast (Russian: Законодательное собрание Омской области, romanized: Zakonodatel'noye sobraniye Omskoy oblasti) is the regional parliament of Omsk Oblast, a federal subject of Russia. A total of 44 deputies are elected for five-year terms.

== Elections ==
=== 2016 ===
| Party | % | Seats |
|---|---|---|
| United Russia | 36.30 | 31 |
| Communist Party of the Russian Federation | 29.48 | 7 |
| Liberal Democratic Party of Russia | 16.31 | 4 |
| A Just Russia | 8.55 | 2 |
| Party of Growth | 2.98 | 0 |
| Yabloko | 2.73 | 0 |
| Registered voters/turnout | 38.25 | |

=== 2021 ===
| Party | % | Seats |
|---|---|---|
| United Russia | 31.29 | 26 |
| Communist Party of the Russian Federation | 23.73 | 10 |
| Communists of Russia | 11.00 | 3 |
| A Just Russia — For Truth | 9.81 | 2 |
| New People | 8.30 | 2 |
| Liberal Democratic Party of Russia | 6.78 | 1 |
| Registered voters/turnout | 41.32 | |

== List of chairmen ==
- Vladimir Varnavsky 1994 - present
