= Administrative divisions of Omsk Oblast =

Omsk Oblast Russia
- Administrative center: Omsk

Administrative structure (as of 2012)
- Districts: 32
- Cities/towns: 6
- Urban-type settlements: 21
- Selsovets: 365

Municipal structure (as of 2002)
- Rural settlements: 1,524 (inhabited); 23 (uninhabited)

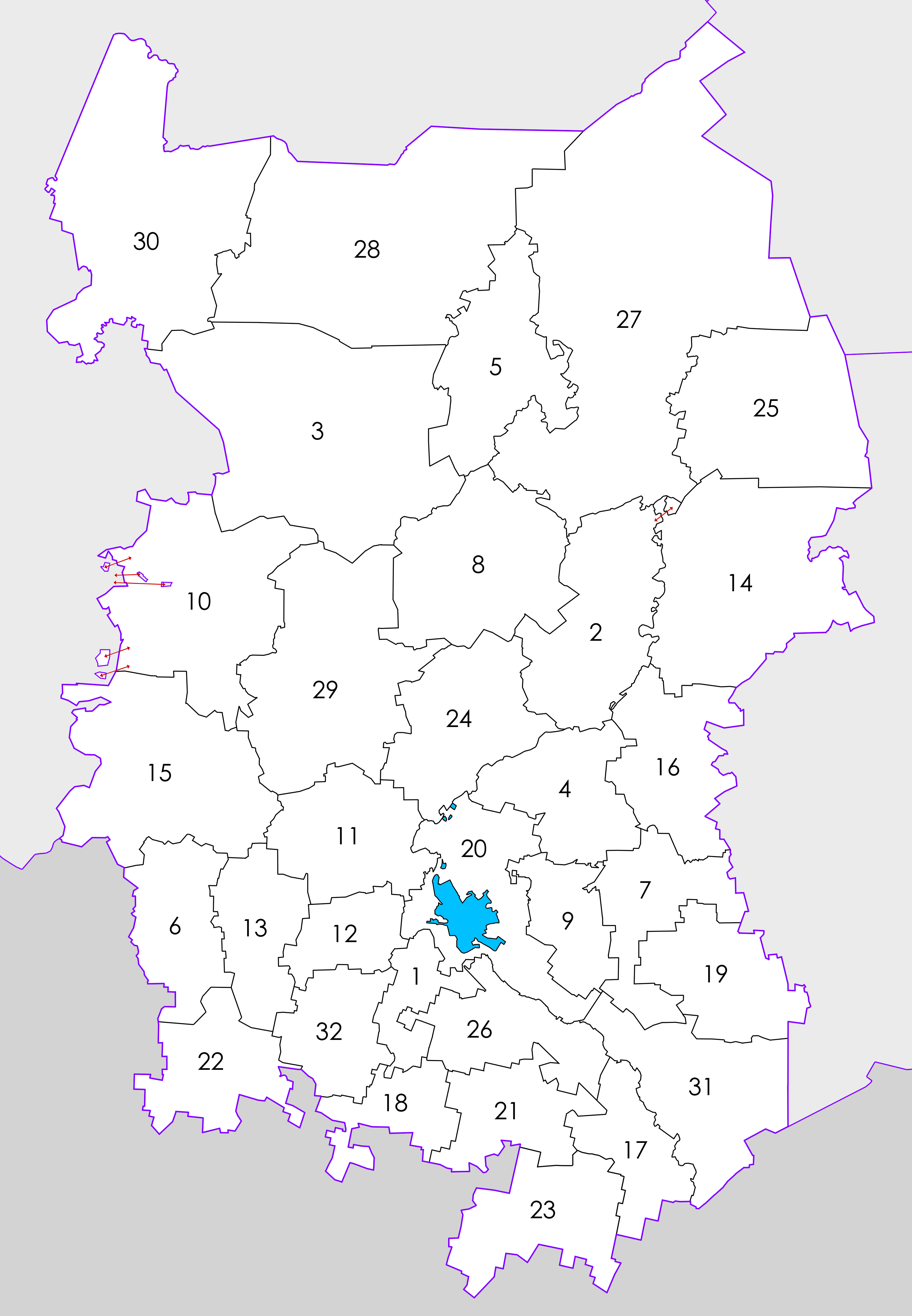
Map of Omsk Oblast (with numbered) & blue dot is show administrative center: Omsk

Omsk Oblast is a federal subject of Russia.

== Administrative and municipal divisions ==
Map

Division		Structure		OKATO	OKTMO	Urban-type settlement/ district-level town*	Rural (rural okrug)
Division		Administrative	Municipal	OKATO	OKTMO	Urban-type settlement/ district-level town*	Rural (rural okrug)
Omsk (Омск)		city	urban okrug	52 401	52 701		
↳	Kirovsky (Кировский)	(under Omsk)	—N/a	52 401	—N/a		
↳	Leninsky (Ленинский)	(under Omsk)	—N/a	52 401	—N/a		
↳	Oktyabrsky (Октябрьский)	(under Omsk)	—N/a	52 401	—N/a		
↳	Sovetsky (Советский)	(under Omsk)	—N/a	52 401	—N/a		
↳	Tsentralny (Центральный)	(under Omsk)	—N/a	52 401	—N/a		
Isilkul (Исилькуль)		city	(under Isilkulsky)	52 405	52 615		
Kalachinsk (Калачинск)		city	(under Kalachinsky)	52 410	52 618		
Nazyvayevsk (Называевск)		city	(under Nazyvayevsky)	52 413	52 636		
Tara (Тара)		city	(under Tarsky)	52 415	52 654		
Tyukalinsk (Тюкалинск)		city	(under Tyukalinsky)	52 418	52 656		
Azovsky Nemetsky (Азовский Немецкий)		national district	district	52 201	52 601		8
Bolsherechensky (Большереченский)		district		52 203	52 603	Bolsherechye (Большеречье)	12
Bolsheukovsky (Большеуковский)		district		52 206	52 606		9
Gorkovsky (Горьковский)		district		52 209	52 609	Gorkovskoye (Горьковское)	11
Znamensky (Знаменский)		district		52 212	52 612		8
Isilkulsky (Исилькульский)		district		52 215	52 615		10
Kalachinsky (Калачинский)		district		52 218	52 618		12
Kolosovsky (Колосовский)		district		52 221	52 621		11
Kormilovsky (Кормиловский)		district		52 223	52 623	Kormilovka (Кормиловка)	10
Krutinsky (Крутинский)		district		52 226	52 626	Krutinka (Крутинка)	9
Lyubinsky (Любинский)		district		52 229	52 629	Krasny Yar (Красный Яр); Lyubinsky (Любинский)	17
Maryanovsky (Марьяновский)		district		52 230	52 630	Maryanovka (Марьяновка)	9
Moskalensky (Москаленский)		district		52 232	52 632	Moskalenki (Москаленки)	12
Muromtsevsky (Муромцевский)		district		52 234	52 634	Muromtsevo (Муромцево)	14
Nazyvayevsky (Называевский)		district		52 236	52 636		15
Nizhneomsky (Нижнеомский)		district		52 239	52 639		11
Novovarshavsky (Нововаршавский)		district		52 241	52 641	Bolshegrivskoye (Большегривское); Novovarshavka (Нововаршавка)	9
Odessky (Одесский)		district		52 242	52 642		9
Okoneshnikovsky (Оконешниковский)		district		52 243	52 643	Okoneshnikovo (Оконешниково)	8
Omsky (Омский)		district		52 244	52 644	Chernoluchinsky suburban (dacha) settlement (Чернолучинский)	23
Pavlogradsky (Павлоградский)		district		52 246	52 646	Pavlogradka (Павлоградка)	9
Poltavsky (Полтавский)		district		52 248	52 648	Poltavka (Полтавка)	8
Russko-Polyansky (Русско-Полянский)		district		52 250	52 650	Russkaya Polyana (Русская Поляна)	10
Sargatsky (Саргатский)		district		52 251	52 651	Sargatskoye (Саргатское)	8
Sedelnikovsky (Седельниковский)		district		52 252	52 652		11
Tavrichesky (Таврический)		district		52 253	52 653	Tavricheskoye (Таврическое)	10
Tarsky (Тарский)		district		52 254	52 654		21
Tevrizsky (Тевризский)		district		52 255	52 655	Tevriz (Тевриз)	13
Tyukalinsky (Тюкалинский)		district		52 256	52 656		16
Ust-Ishimsky (Усть-Ишимский)		district		52 257	52 657		13
Cherlaksky (Черлакский)		district		52 258	52 658	Cherlak (Черлак)	10
Sherbakulsky (Шербакулинский)		district		52 259	52 659	Sherbakul (Шербакуль)	9
