= Muromtsevo =

Muromtsevo (Russian: Муромцево) is the name of several inhabited localities in Russia.

Urban localities

- Muromtsevo, Omsk Oblast, a work settlement in Muromtsevsky District of Omsk Oblast

Rural localities

- Muromtsevo, Kaluga Oblast, a selo in Babyninsky District of Kaluga Oblast
- Muromtsevo, Lipetsk Oblast, a village in Preobrazhensky Selsoviet of Izmalkovsky District of Lipetsk Oblast
- Muromtsevo, Volokolamsky District, Moscow Oblast, a village under the administrative jurisdiction of the Town of Volokolamsk in Volokolamsky District of Moscow Oblast
- Muromtsevo, Voskresensky District, Moscow Oblast, a village in Fedinskoye Rural Settlement of Voskresensky District of Moscow Oblast
- Muromtsevo, Oryol Oblast, a village in Nikitinsky Selsoviet of Novoderevenkovsky District of Oryol Oblast
- Muromtsevo, Vladimir Oblast, a settlement in Sudogodsky District of Vladimir Oblast

Renamed localities

- Muromtsevo, name of Krasnoarmeysk, a town in Moscow Oblast, before 1928
