= Lyubinsky =

Lyubinsky (masculine), Lyubinskaya (feminine), or Lyubinskoye (neuter) may refer to:

- Lyubinsky District, a district of Omsk Oblast, Russia
- Lyubinsky (urban-type settlement), an urban locality (a work settlement) in Lyubinsky District of Omsk Oblast, Russia
