= Alexander Tchayka =

Ukrainian spree killer (born 1974)

- Picture of Alexander Tchayka on 17 February 1994.
- Born: Alexander Tchayka; 23 July 1974 (age 52); Russkaya Polyana, Russian SSR, Soviet Union
- Other name: The Fur Coat Hunter
- Convictions: Murder with aggravating circumstances (4 counts); Rape
- Penalty: Death (commuted to life imprisonment)

Details
- Victims: 4
- Span of crimes: January 31, 1994 – February 12, 1994
- Country: Russia

Alexander Nikolaevich Tchayka (Russian: Александр Николаевич Чайка, born 23 July 1974) is a Ukrainian serial killer, also known as The Fur Coat Hunter, convicted of the killing of 4 women in Moscow over a two-week period in early 1994.

== Background ==
Alexander Nikolaevich Tchayka was born 23 July 1974, in Sumy, Ukraine SSR (now Ukraine). In 1989, 14-year-old Tchayka was arrested and convicted for participating in the gang-rape of a young girl, receiving a 5-year sentence at a prison near Kharkiv, but was released early on parole on July 16, 1993, for "excellent behavior".

== Murders ==
At some point after his release from the Kharkiv prison, Tchayka travelled from Ukraine to Russia. The reason for his relocation is unknown, but Tchayka ended up in Moscow. On January 31, 1994, 19-year-old Tchayka committed his first murder, killing a 38-year-old woman by stabbing her 21 times with a knife. The victim's injuries were so bad that only her son could identify her remains.

The second victim was killed a week later, on February 7. Tchayka stabbed a 50-year-old woman 17 times, stealing her gold ring. The third victim was killed the next day, on February 8. The 82-year-old woman was stabbed 8 times, with Tchayka stealing her handbag and a gold ring.

On February 12, Tchayka murdered his last victim, a 40-year-old woman. Unlike the previous murders, police analysts found evidence about the killer's identity, however they could not determine a particular person.

After the fourth murder, the police launched an operation in Moscow to catch the serial killer. The operation was code-named "Shuba", meaning fur coat, because the killer targeted women wearing fur coats, commonly worn by Russian women in the winter. The only information the police had about the suspect was that he was young, tall, and wore black and gray clothing. Female police officers wearing fur coats wandered around Moscow attempting to attract the attention of the killer so they could then arrest him, however there was no success. One officer was mugged at knife-point, but after the mugger was arrested he and the knife were found to not match those of the killer.

== Arrest and conviction ==
A few days later on February 14, a detective working on the case saw Tchayka in the Frunzenskaya station of the Moscow Metro wearing a black jacket, gray-black pants and carrying a black bag. His characteristics and clothing matched the details of the suspect, and the detective thought he appeared suspicious and followed him. Hours later the detective arrested the Tchayka because of his suspicious behavior and clothing, and soon after his arrest Tchayka confessed to the murders.

Tchayka was found guilty of the murders and sentenced to death, but was not executed because of a moratorium of the death penalty in Russia, and is now serving a life sentence.
