= Novouralsky =

Novouralsky (masculine), Novouralskaya (feminine), or Novouralskoye (neuter) may refer to:

- Novouralsky Urban Okrug, a municipal formation of Sverdlovsk Oblast, Russia, which the town of Novouralsk is incorporated as
- Novouralsky (inhabited locality) (Novouralskaya, Novouralskoye), name of several rural localities in Russia
