= Cherlaksky =

Cherlaksky (masculine), Cherlakskaya (feminine), or Cherlakskoye (neuter) may refer to:

- Cherlaksky District, a district of Omsk Oblast, Russia
- Cherlakskoye, a rural locality (a selo) in Omsk Oblast, Russia
