= Russkaya Polyana =

Russkaya Polyana (Russian: Русская Поляна) is the name of several urban and rural inhabited localities (work settlements, selos, stations, and villages) in Russia.

Urban localities

- Russkaya Polyana (urban-type settlement), Omsk Oblast, a work settlement in Russko-Polyansky District of Omsk Oblast

Rural localities

- Russkaya Polyana, Jewish Autonomous Oblast, a selo in Birobidzhansky District of the Jewish Autonomous Oblast
- Russkaya Polyana (station), Omsk Oblast, a station under the administrative jurisdiction of the work settlement of Russkaya Polyana in Russko-Polyansky District of Omsk Oblast
- Russkaya Polyana, Penza Oblast, a village in Kirillovsky Selsoviet of Zemetchinsky District of Penza Oblast
