= Ivanov Mys =

Ivanov Mys (Russian: Иванов Мыс) is the name of several rural localities in Russia:

- Ivanov Mys, Irkutsk Oblast, a village in Tayshetsky District of Irkutsk Oblast
- Ivanov Mys, Omsk Oblast, a selo in Ivanovo-Myssky Rural Okrug of Tevrizsky District of Omsk Oblast
