= Bolshegrivskoye =

Bolshegrivskoye Большегривское
- Urban-type settlement
- Interactive map of Bolshegrivskoye
- Location of Bolshegrivskoye Bolshegrivskoye (Omsk Oblast)
- Coordinates: 53.9137°N 74.9167°E
- Country: Russia
- Federal subject: Omsk Oblast
- Administrative district: Novovarshavsky District
- Founded: 1958
- Elevation: 92 m (302 ft)

Population (2010 Census)
  - Total: 3,637
  - Estimate (2025): 2,982 (−18%)
- Time zone: UTC+6 (MSK+3)
- Postal code: 646850
- OKTMO ID: 52641152051

Bolshegrivskoye (Russian: Большегривское) is an urban locality (an urban-type settlement) in Novovarshavsky District of Omsk Oblast, Russia. Population: 3,637 (2010 census); 3,809 (2002 census); 4,282 (1989 Soviet census).
