= Novouralsky (inhabited locality) =

Name of several Russian rural localities

Novouralsky (Russian: Новоура́льский; masculine), Novouralskaya (Новоура́льская; feminine), or Novouralskoye (Новоура́льское; neuter) is the name of several rural localities in Russia:

- Novouralsky (rural locality), a settlement in Novouralsky Rural Okrug of Tavrichesky District of Omsk Oblast
- Novouralskoye, a selo in Novouralsky Rural Okrug of Pavlogradsky District of Omsk Oblast
