= Nazyvayevsk =

Town in Omsk Oblast, Russia

Nazyvayevsk Называевск
- Town
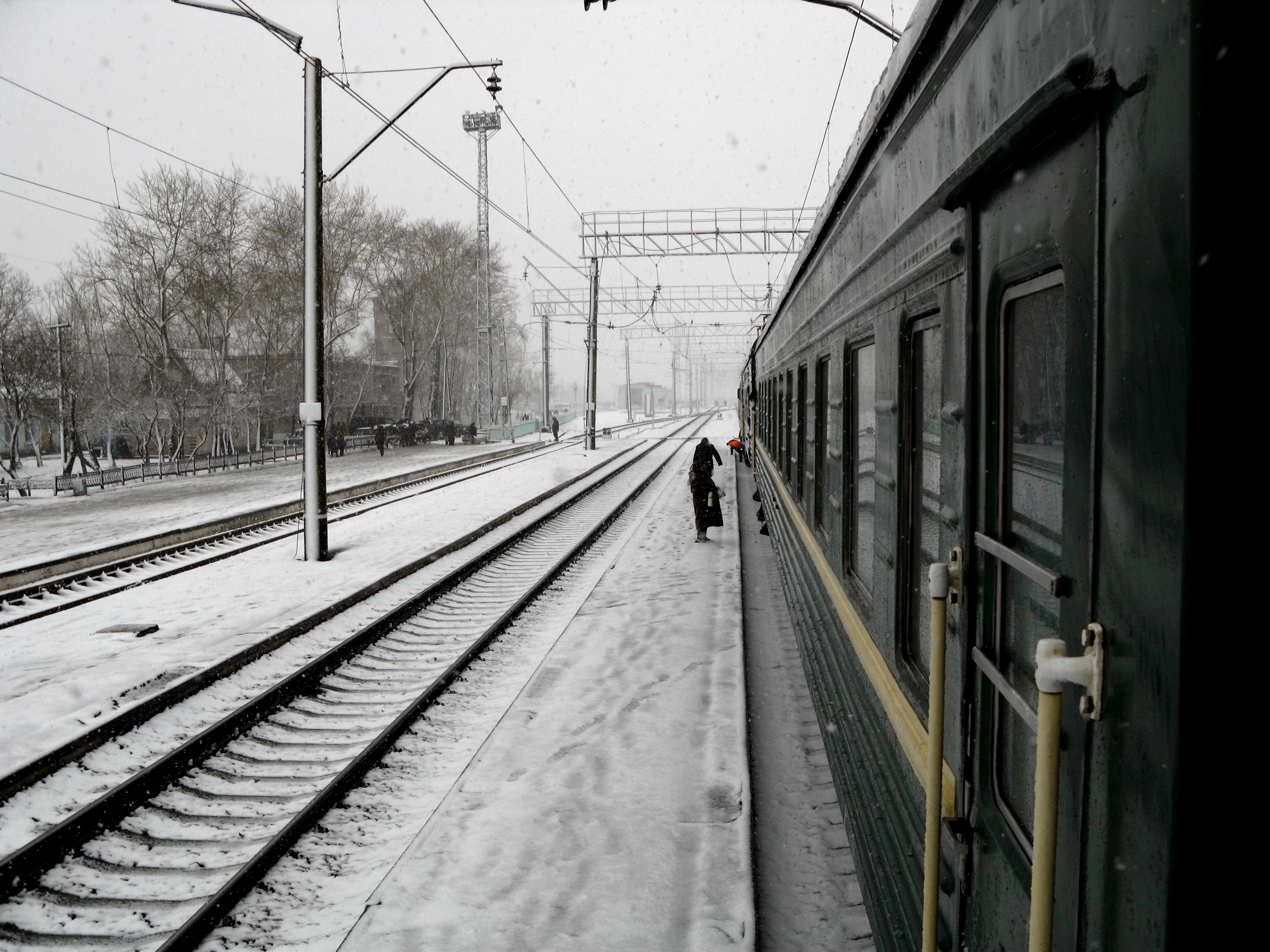

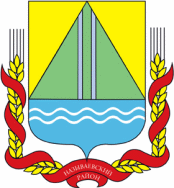
- Flag Coat of arms
- Interactive map of Nazyvayevsk
- Location of Nazyvayevsk Nazyvayevsk (Omsk Oblast)
- Coordinates: 55°34′N 71°16′E
- Country: Russia
- Federal subject: Omsk Oblast
- Founded: 1910
- Town status since: 1956
- Elevation: 120 m (390 ft)

Population (2010 Census)
  - Total: 11,615
  - Estimate (2023): 10,236 (−11.9%)

Administrative status
  - Subordinated to: town of oblast significance of Nazyvayevsk
  - Capital of: Nazyvayevsky District, town of oblast significance of Nazyvayevsk

Municipal status
  - Municipal district: Nazyvayevsky Municipal District
  - Urban settlement: Nazyvayevsk Urban Settlement
  - Capital of: Nazyvayevsky Municipal District, Nazyvayevsk Urban Settlement
- Time zone: UTC+6 (MSK+3)
- Postal codes: 646100, 646101, 646103, 646104
- Dialing code: +7 38161
- OKTMO ID: 52636101001

Nazyvayevsk population
- 2010 Census: 11,615
- 2002 Census: 13,012
- 1989 Census: 14,416
- 1979 Census: 14,164

Nazyvayevsk (Russian: Называ́евск; Kazakh: Называй, Nazyvaı) is a town in Omsk Oblast, Russia, located 120 kilometers (75 mi) west of Omsk, the administrative center of the oblast. As of the 2010 Census, its population was 11,615.

It was previously known as Sibirsky Posad (until 1917), Sibirskoye (until 1933), Nazyvayevka (until 1947), Novonazyvayevsk (until 1956).

== Administrative and municipal status ==
Within the framework of administrative divisions, Nazyvayevsk serves as the administrative center of Nazyvayevsky District, even though it is not a part of it. As an administrative division, it is incorporated separately as the town of oblast significance of Nazyvayevsk—an administrative unit with the status equal to that of the districts. As a municipal division, the town of oblast significance of Nazyvayevsk is incorporated within Nazyvayevsky Municipal District as Nazyvayevsk Urban Settlement.

== Transportation ==
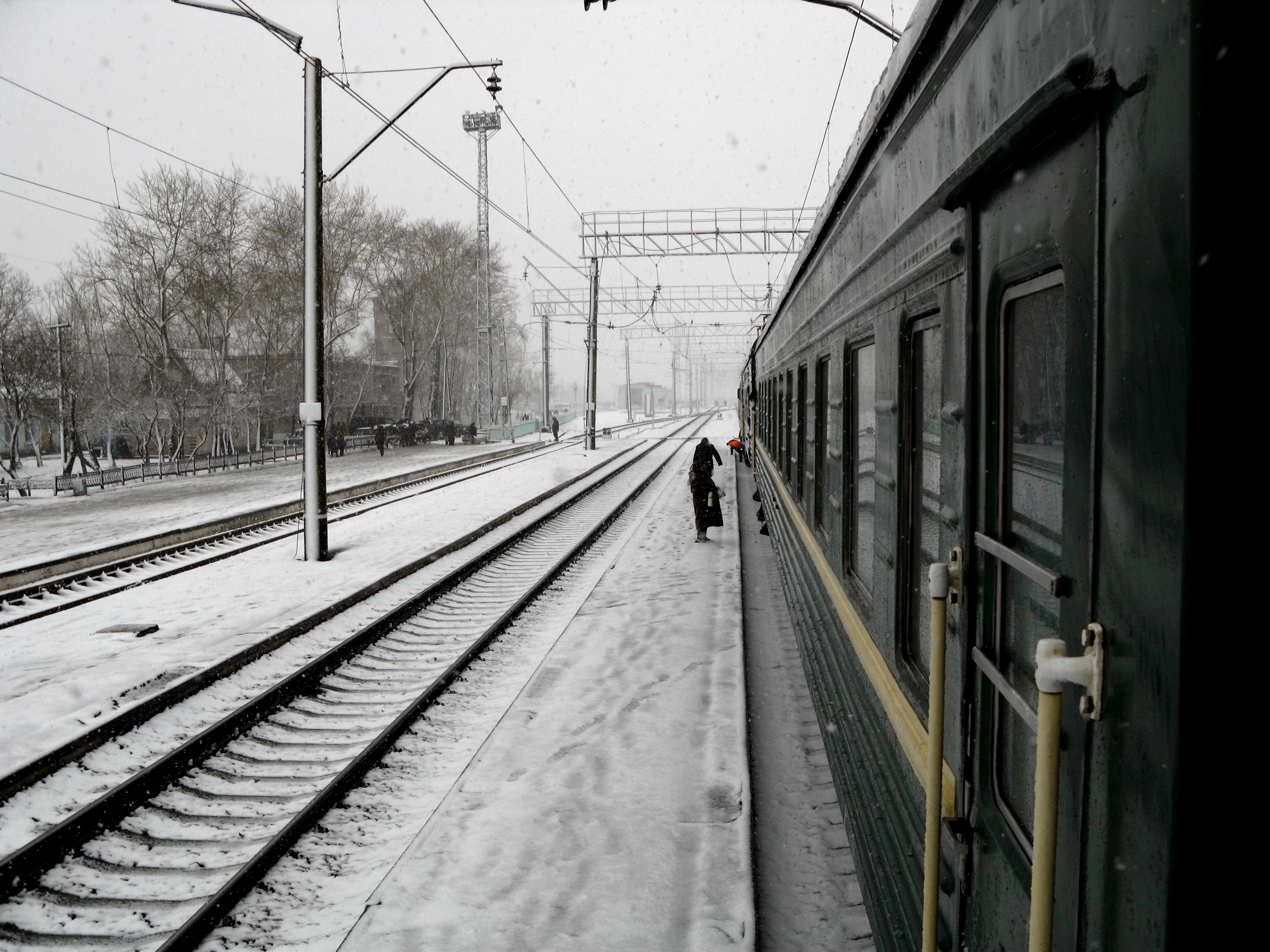
Nazyvayevsk railway station

The town is a transfer point on the northern branch of the Trans-Siberian Railway between the Western Siberian and Sverdlovsk railways.
