= Krutinsky District =

Krutinsky District Крутинский район (Russian)
- District
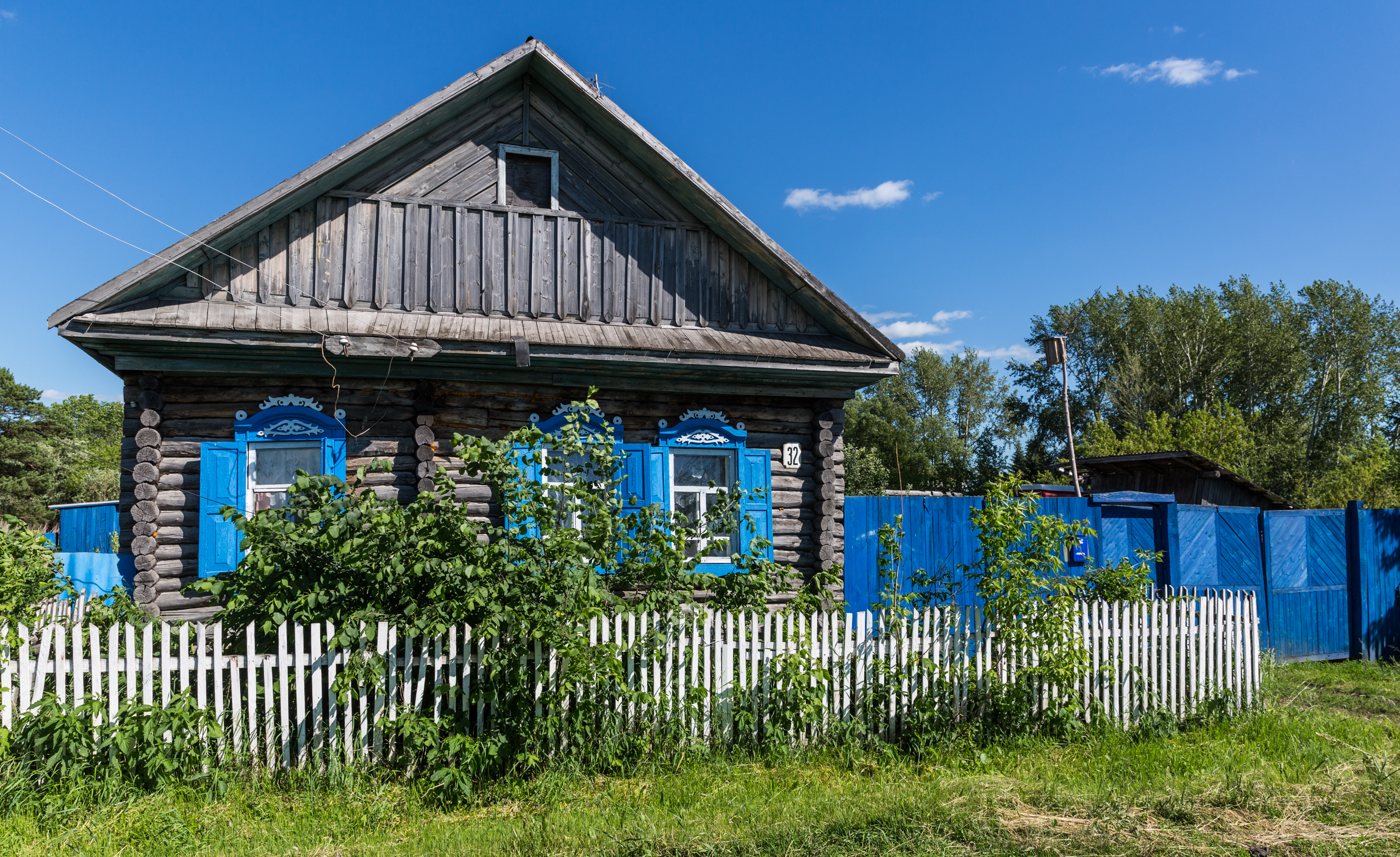
- House in Krutinsky District

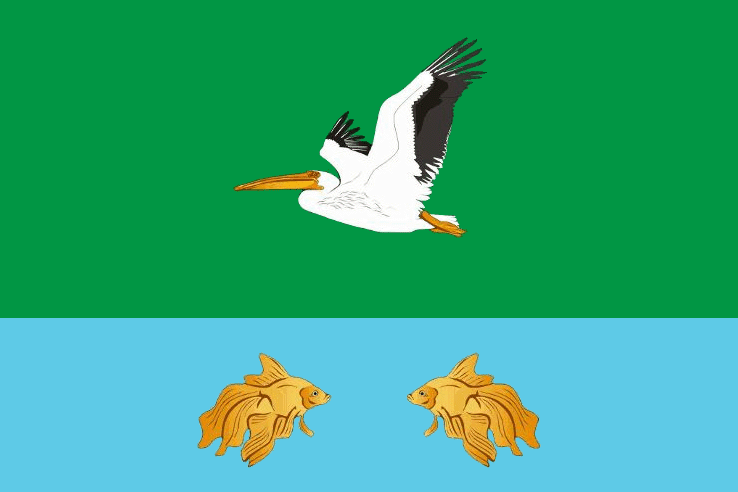
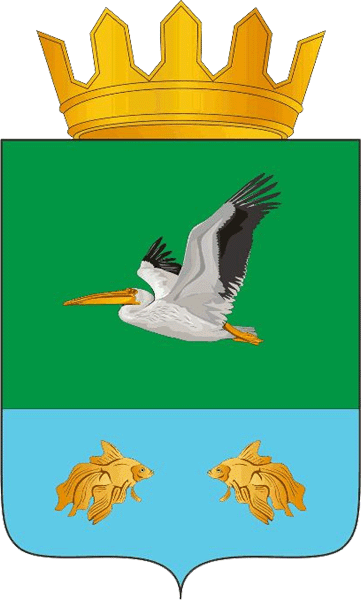
- Flag Coat of arms
- Location of Krutinsky District in Omsk Oblast
- Coordinates: 56°00′23″N 71°30′41″E
- Country: Russia
- Federal subject: Omsk Oblast
- Established: 1925
- Administrative center: Krutinka

Area
  - Total: 5,700 km^{2} (2,200 sq mi)

Population (2010 Census)
  - Total: 17,408
  - Density: 3.1/km^{2} (7.9/sq mi)
  - Urban: 42.1%
  - Rural: 57.9%

Administrative structure
  - Administrative divisions: 1 Work settlements, 9 Rural okrugs
  - Inhabited localities: 1 urban-type settlements, 46 rural localities

Municipal structure
  - Municipally incorporated as: Krutinsky Municipal District
  - Municipal divisions: 1 urban settlements, 9 rural settlements
- Time zone: UTC+6 (MSK+3)
- OKTMO ID: 52626000
- Website: http://krutin.omskportal.ru/

Krutinsky District (Russian: Крути́нский райо́н) is an administrative and municipal district (raion), one of the thirty-two in Omsk Oblast, Russia. It is located in the west of the oblast. The area of the district is 5,700 square kilometers (2,200 sq mi). Its administrative center is the urban locality (a work settlement) of Krutinka. Population: 17,408 (2010 Census); 21,287 (2002 census); 23,411 (1989 Soviet census). The population of Krutinka accounts for 42.1% of the district's total population.

== Geography ==
The Krutinka Lake group, with lakes Tenis-Saltaim, Ik and other smaller ones, is located in the district.

== Notable residents ==
- Yuri Gryadunov (1929–2020), Soviet and Russian diplomat, born in the village of Sladkoye
