= Okoneshnikovsky District =

Okoneshnikovsky District Оконешниковский район (Russian)
- District
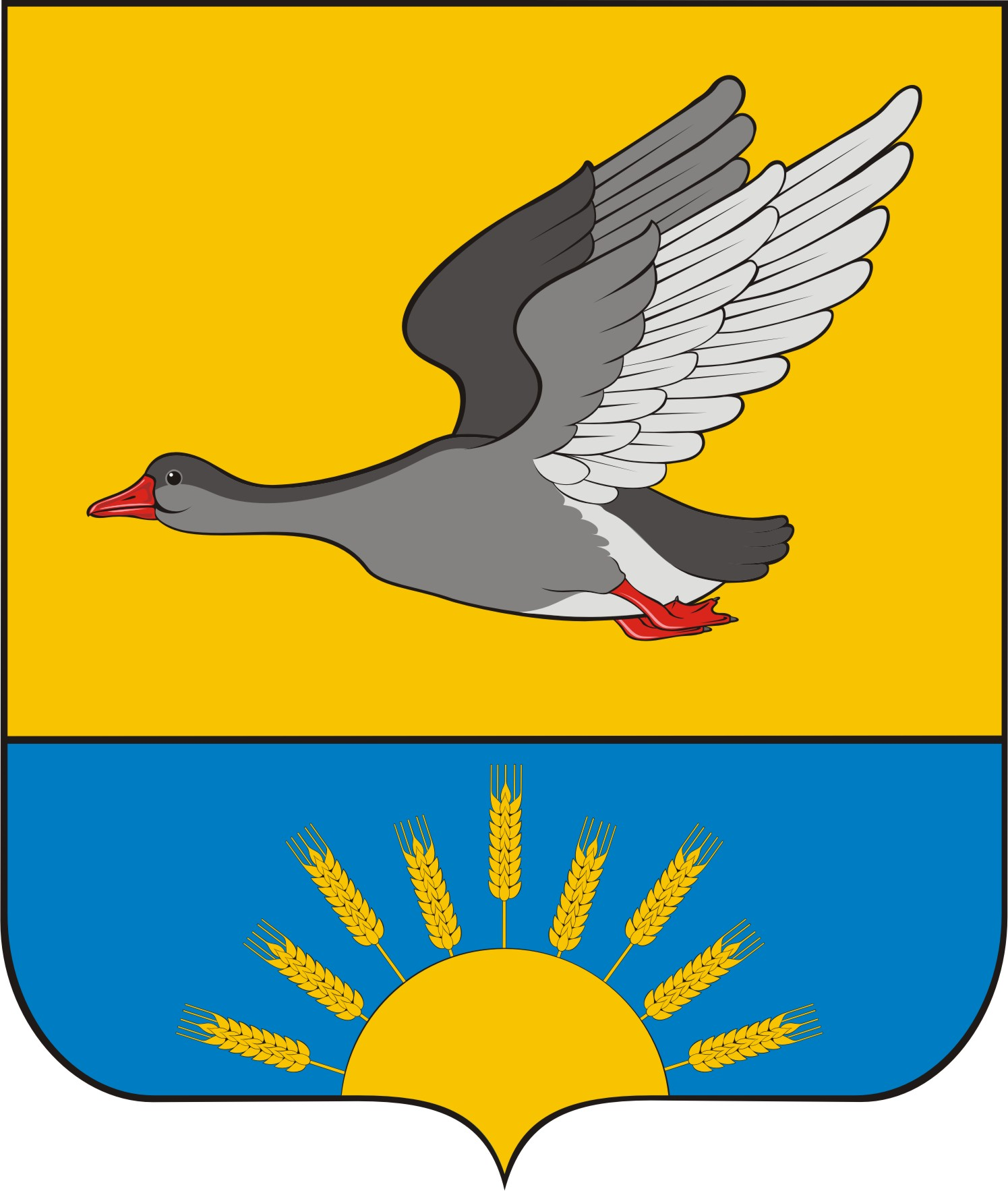
- Flag Coat of arms
- Location of Okoneshnikovsky District in Omsk Oblast
- Coordinates: 54°20′22″N 75°04′55″E
- Country: Russia
- Federal subject: Omsk Oblast
- Administrative center: Okoneshnikovo

Area
  - Total: 3,100 km^{2} (1,200 sq mi)

Population (2010 Census)
  - Total: 14,791
  - Density: 4.8/km^{2} (12/sq mi)
  - Urban: 35.2%
  - Rural: 64.8%

Administrative structure
  - Administrative divisions: 1 Work settlements, 8 Rural okrugs
  - Inhabited localities: 1 urban-type settlements, 32 rural localities

Municipal structure
  - Municipally incorporated as: Okoneshnikovsky Municipal District
  - Municipal divisions: 1 urban settlements, 8 rural settlements
- Time zone: UTC+6 (MSK+3)
- OKTMO ID: 52643000
- Website: http://www.okonesh.omskportal.ru/

Okoneshnikovsky District (Russian: Оконе́шниковский райо́н) is an administrative and municipal district (raion), one of the thirty-two in Omsk Oblast, Russia. It is located in the southeast of the oblast. The area of the district is 3,100 square kilometers (1,200 sq mi). Its administrative center is the urban locality (a work settlement) of Okoneshnikovo. Population: 14,791 (2010 Census); 17,280 (2002 Census); 19,744 (1989 Soviet census). The population of Okoneshnikovo accounts for 35.2% of the district's total population.
