= Sherbakulsky District =

Sherbakulsky District Шербакульский район (Russian)
- District
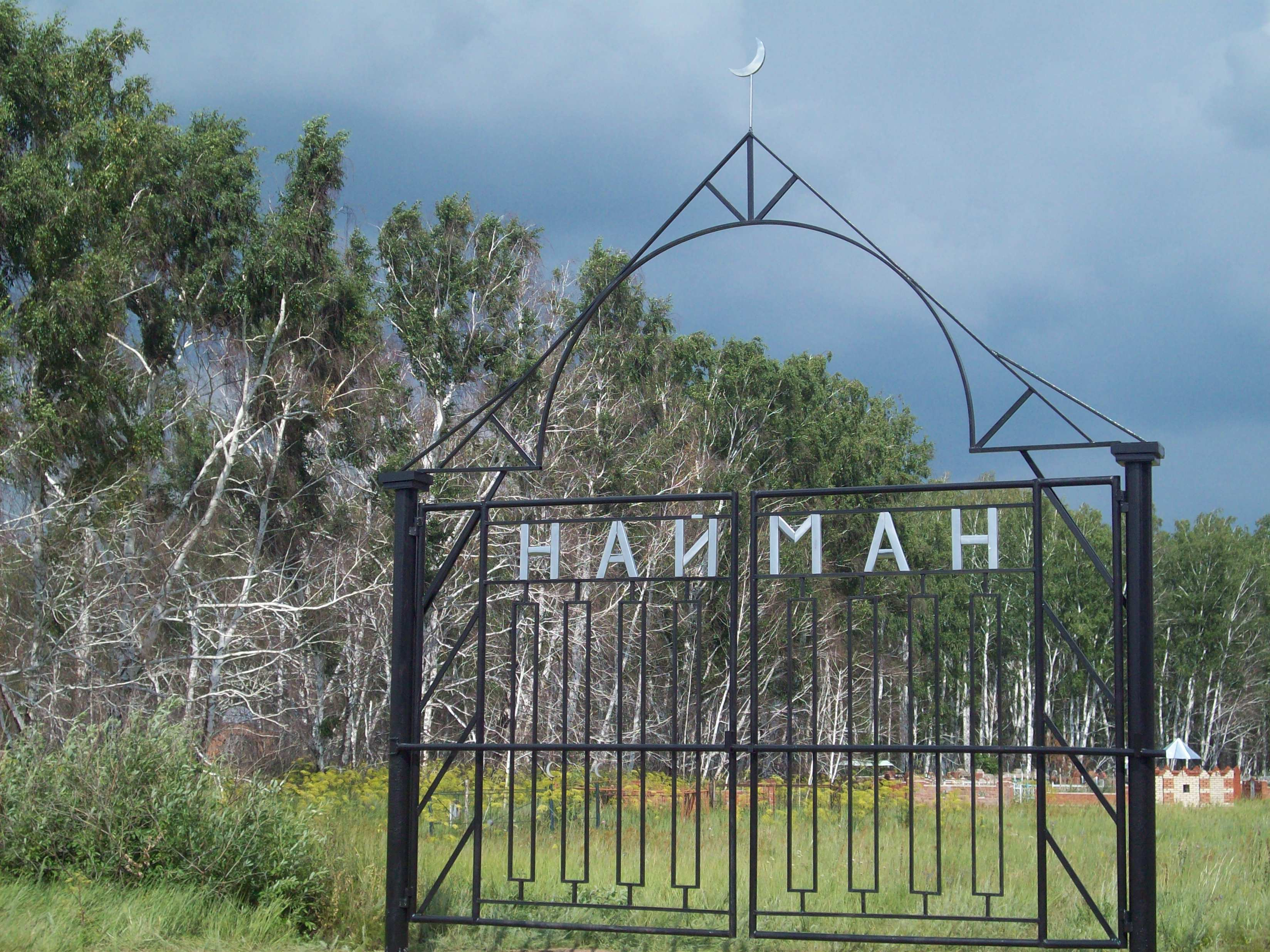
- Country cemetery in the village of Naiman, Sherbakulsky District

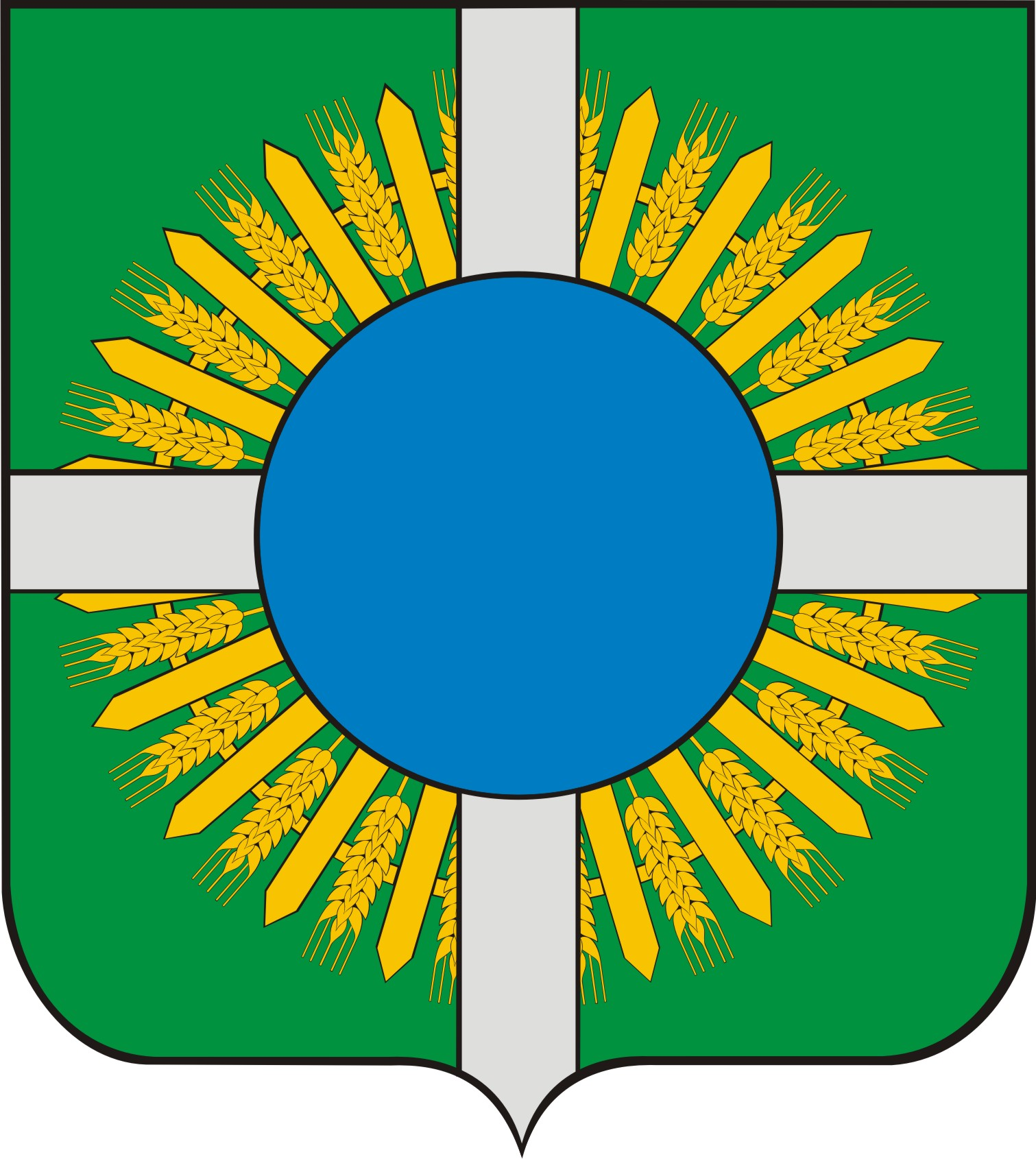
- Flag Coat of arms
- Location of Sherbakulsky District in Omsk Oblast
- Coordinates: 54°30′N 72°30′E
- Country: Russia
- Federal subject: Omsk Oblast
- Established: October 14, 1924
- Administrative center: Sherbakul

Area
  - Total: 2,300 km^{2} (890 sq mi)

Population (2010 Census)
  - Total: 21,342
  - Density: 9.3/km^{2} (24/sq mi)
  - Urban: 32.7%
  - Rural: 67.3%

Administrative structure
  - Administrative divisions: 1 Work settlements, 9 Rural okrugs
  - Inhabited localities: 1 urban-type settlements, 37 rural localities

Municipal structure
  - Municipally incorporated as: Sherbakulsky Municipal District
  - Municipal divisions: 1 urban settlements, 9 rural settlements
- Time zone: UTC+6 (MSK+3)
- OKTMO ID: 52659000
- Website: http://sherb.omskportal.ru/

Sherbakulsky District (Russian: Шербаку́льский райо́н; Kazakh: Шарбақкөл ауданы, Sharbaqkól aýdany) is an administrative and municipal district (raion), one of the thirty-two in Omsk Oblast, Russia. It is located in the southwest of the oblast on the border with Kazakhstan. The area of the district is 2,300 square kilometers (890 sq mi). Its administrative center is the urban locality (a work settlement) of Sherbakul. Population: 21,342 (2010 Census); 25,486 (2002 census); 29,906 (1989 Soviet census). The population of Sherbakul accounts for 32.7% of the district's total population.

== History ==
The territory of what is now Sherbakulsky District was a part of the Kazakh Khanate until 1718, when, after the death of Tauke Khan, the khanate broke apart and Cossack units moving south from Russia occupied the area. In the 1890s, these former Kazakh grazing lands were opened for settlement. In 1893, the first settlement was established at Borisovka by Russian and Ukrainian settlers. In 1895, German settlers established Krasnoyarka, and in 1896—Maksimovka.

Modern Sherbakulsky District was created on October 14, 1924 as part of the Soviet reorganization of the oblast structure under the State Division of Soviet Middle Asian Republics.

== Administrative and municipal divisions ==
As an administrative division, the district is divided into one work settlement (Sherbakul) and nine rural okrugs (Alexandrovsky, Babezhsky, Borisovsky, Izyumovsky, Krasnoyarsky, Kutuzovsky, Maksimovsky, Slavyansky, and Yekaterinoslavsky) comprising thirty-seven rural localities.

As a municipal division, the district is incorporated as Sherbakulsky Municipal District and divided into one urban settlement (within the borders of the work settlement of Sherbakul) and nine rural settlements (which correspond to the rural okrugs).

== Notable people ==
- Zhumabay Shayakhmetov (1902–1966), First Secretary of the Communist Party of the Kazakh SSR 1946–1954
- Baltash Tursymbaev (1946–2022), Kazakh diplomat and politician
