= Krasny Yar, Omsk Oblast =

Krasny Yar Красный Яр
- Urban-type settlement
- Interactive map of Krasny Yar
- Location of Krasny Yar Krasny Yar (Omsk Oblast)
- Coordinates: 55.2398°N 72.9246°E
- Country: Russia
- Federal subject: Omsk Oblast
- Administrative district: Lyubinsky District
- Founded: 1752
- Elevation: 82 m (269 ft)

Population (2010 Census)
  - Total: 5,133
  - Estimate (2025): 5,438 (+5.9%)
- Time zone: UTC+6 (MSK+3)
- Postal code: 646176
- OKTMO ID: 52629157051

Krasny Yar (Russian: Красный Яр) is an urban locality (an urban-type settlement) in Lyubinsky District of Omsk Oblast, Russia. Population: 5,133 (2010 census); 5,387 (2002 census); 4,826 (1989 Soviet census).
