= Nazyvayevsky District =

Nazyvayevsky District Называевский район (Russian)
- District
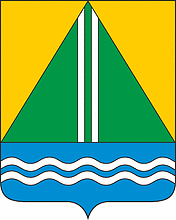
- Flag Coat of arms
- Location of Nazyvayevsky District in Omsk Oblast
- Coordinates: 55°34′N 71°21′E
- Country: Russia
- Federal subject: Omsk Oblast
- Established: 25 May 1925
- Administrative center: Nazyvayevsk

Area
  - Total: 5,900 km^{2} (2,300 sq mi)

Population (2010 Census)
  - Total: 12,372
  - Density: 2.1/km^{2} (5.4/sq mi)
  - Urban: 0%
  - Rural: 100%

Administrative structure
  - Administrative divisions: 15 rural okrug
  - Inhabited localities: 72 rural localities

Municipal structure
  - Municipally incorporated as: Nazyvayevsky Municipal District
  - Municipal divisions: 1 urban settlements, 15 rural settlements
- Time zone: UTC+6 (MSK+3)
- OKTMO ID: 52636000
- Website: http://naz.omskportal.ru/

Nazyvayevsky District (Russian: Называ́евский райо́н; Kazakh: Называй ауданы, Nazyvaı aýdany) is an administrative and municipal district (raion), one of the thirty-two in Omsk Oblast, Russia. It is located in the west of the oblast. The area of the district is 5,900 square kilometers (2,300 sq mi). Its administrative center is the town of Nazyvayevsk (which is not administratively a part of the district). Population: 12,372 (2010 Census); 17,654 (2002 census); 21,626 (1989 Soviet census).

== Administrative and municipal status ==
Within the framework of administrative divisions, Nazyvayevsky District is one of the thirty-two in the oblast. The town of Nazyvayevsk, which serves as its administrative center, is incorporated separately as a town of oblast significance—an administrative unit with the status equal to that of the districts.

As a municipal division, the district is incorporated as Nazyvayevsky Municipal District, with the town of oblast significance of Nazyvayevsk being incorporated within it as Nazyvayevsk Urban Settlement.
