= Tevrizsky District =

Tevrizsky District Тевризский район (Russian)
- District
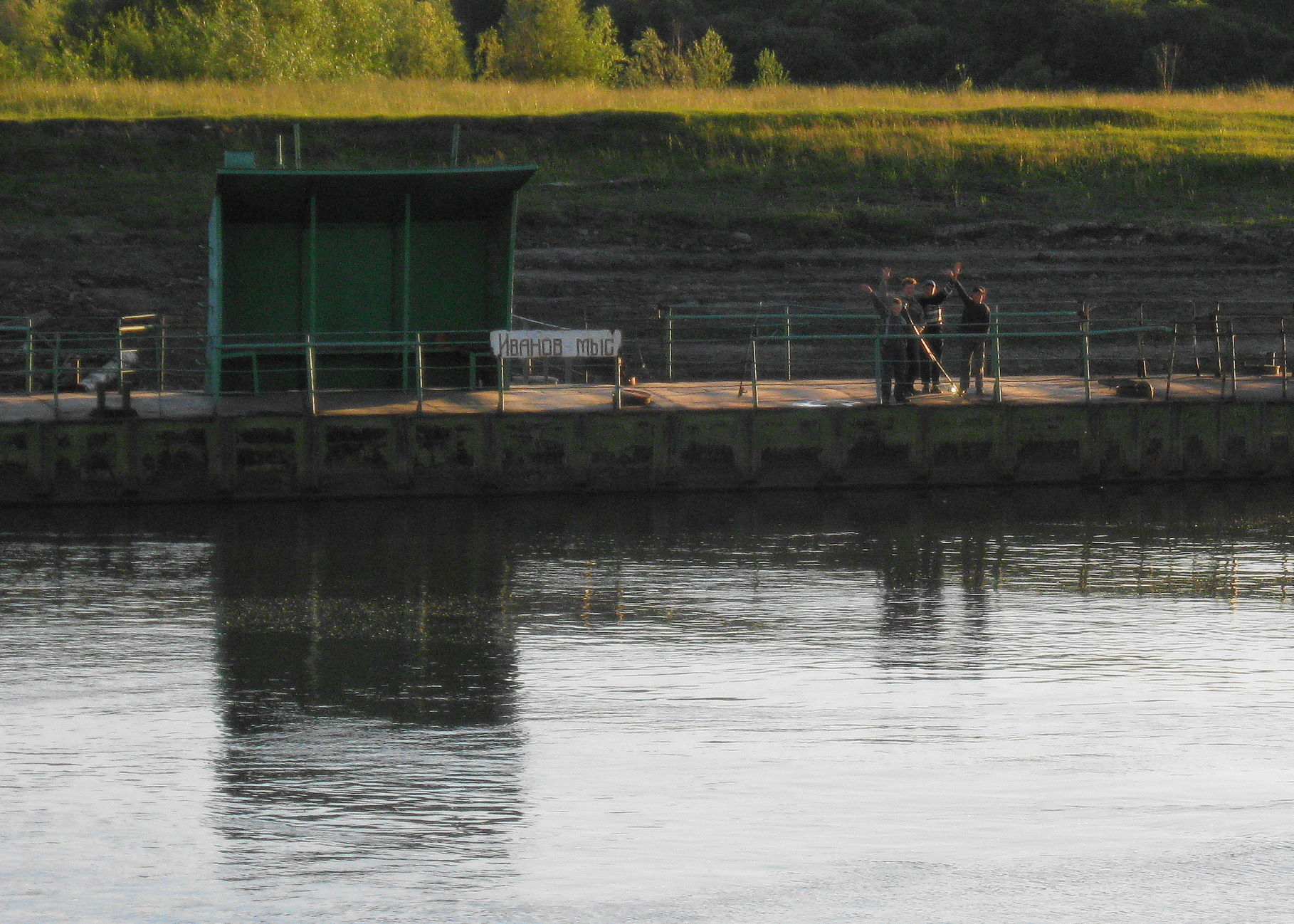
- A pier in the selo of Ivanov Mys in Tevrizsky District

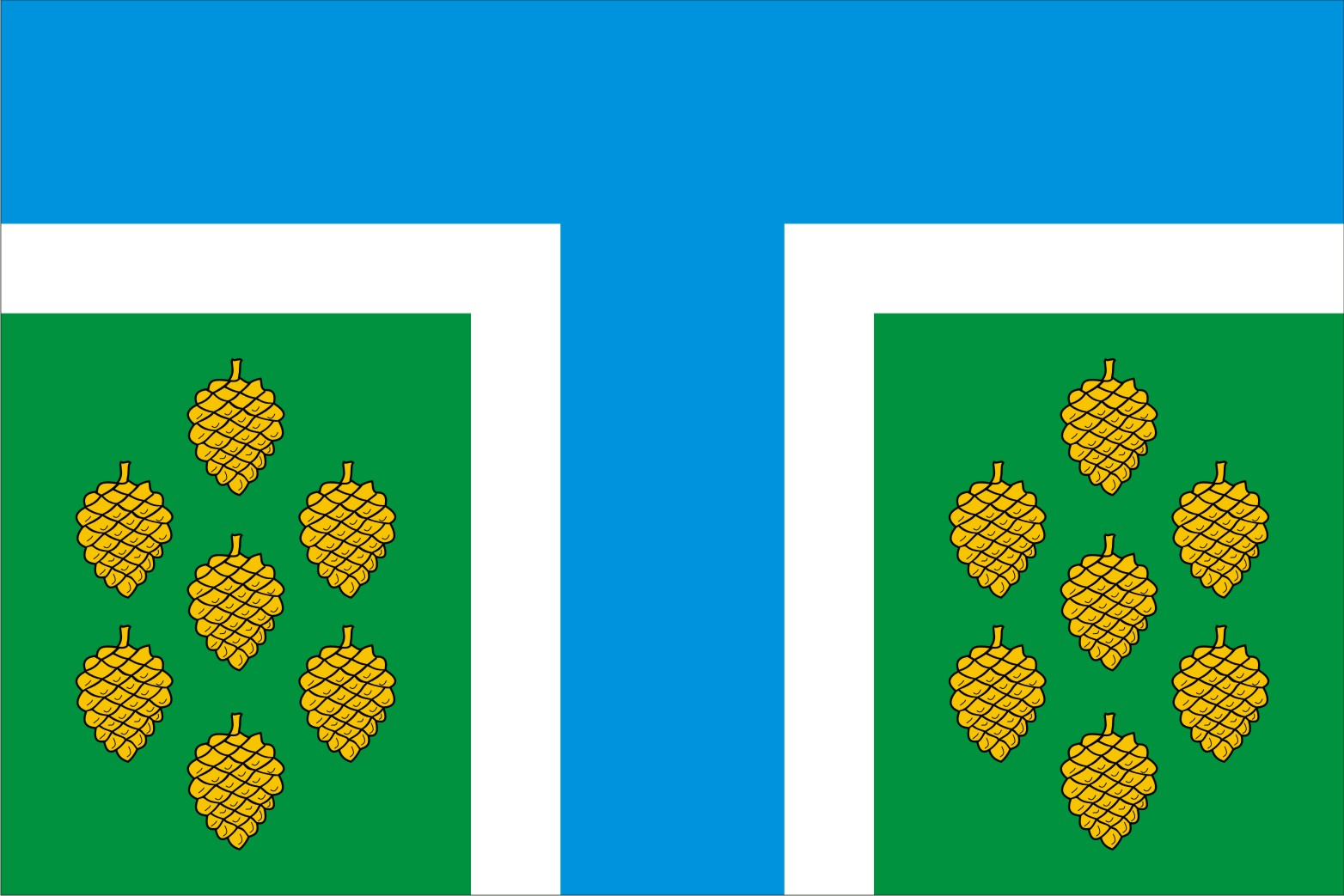
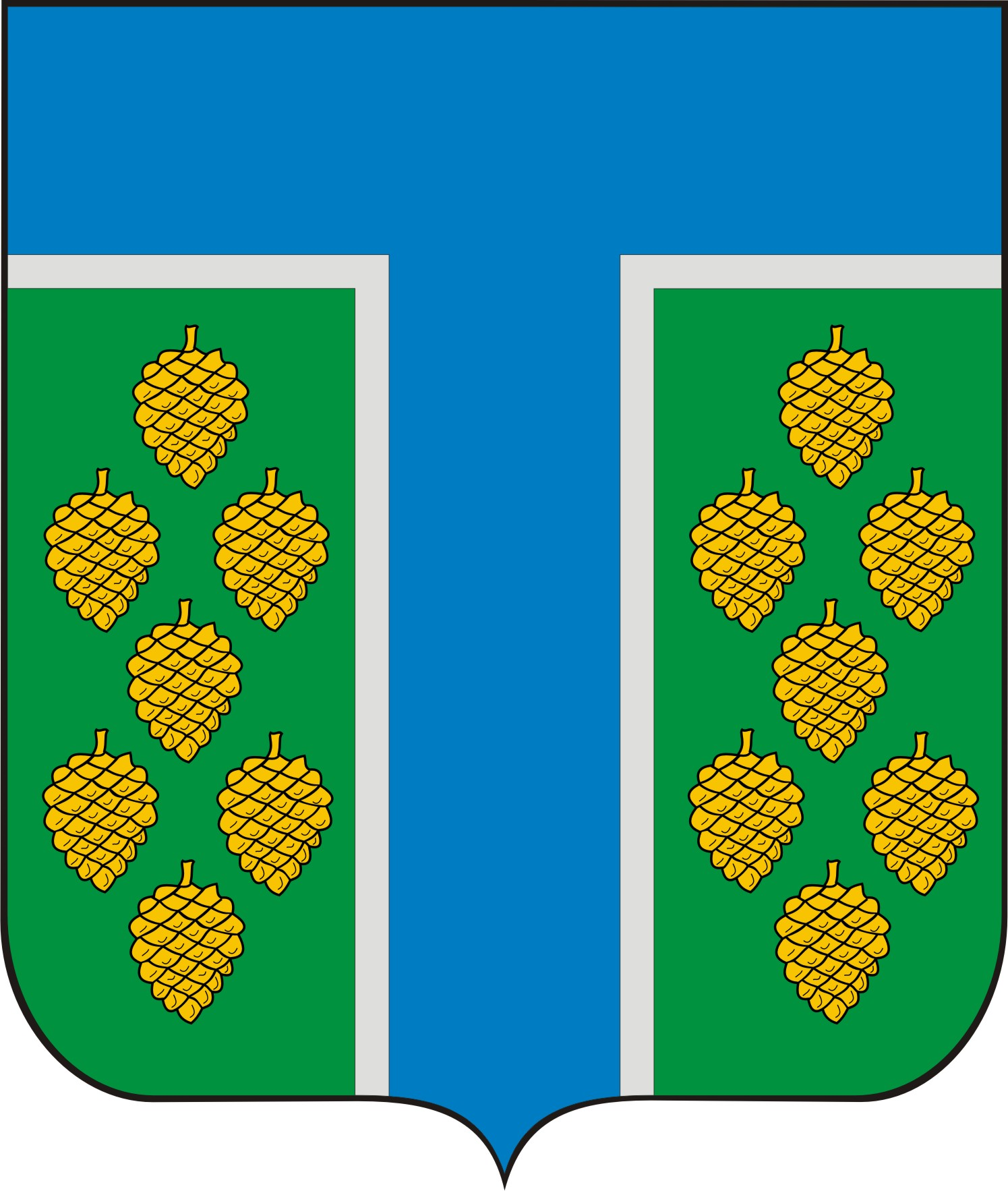
- Flag Coat of arms
- Location of Tevrizsky District in Omsk Oblast
- Coordinates: 57°31′N 72°24′E
- Country: Russia
- Federal subject: Omsk Oblast
- Established: 25 May 1925
- Administrative center: Tevriz

Area
  - Total: 9,800 km^{2} (3,800 sq mi)

Population (2010 Census)
  - Total: 15,485
  - Density: 1.6/km^{2} (4.1/sq mi)
  - Urban: 45.1%
  - Rural: 54.9%

Administrative structure
  - Administrative divisions: 1 Work settlements, 13 Rural okrugs
  - Inhabited localities: 1 urban-type settlements, 36 rural localities

Municipal structure
  - Municipally incorporated as: Tevrizsky Municipal District
  - Municipal divisions: 1 urban settlements, 13 rural settlements
- Time zone: UTC+6 (MSK+3)
- OKTMO ID: 52655000
- Website: http://www.tevr.omskportal.ru/

Tevrizsky District (Russian: Теври́зский райо́н) is an administrative and municipal district (raion), one of the thirty-two in Omsk Oblast, Russia. It is located in the north of the oblast. The area of the district is 9,800 square kilometers (3,800 sq mi). Its administrative center is the urban locality (a work settlement) of Tevriz. Population: 15,485 (2010 Census); 18,090 (2002 census); 20,249 (1989 Soviet census). The population of Tevriz accounts for 45.1% of the district's total population.

== Population ==
Russians 74.87%, Tatars 21.43%, Germans 0.63%, Ukrainians 0.61%.
