= Muromtsevo, Vladimir Oblast =

Muromtsevo Муромцево
- Settlement
- Location within Vladimir Oblast Location within Russia
- Coordinates: 55°55′N 40°54′E
- Country: Russia
- Region: Vladimir Oblast
- District: Sudogodsky District
- Time zone: UTC+3:00

Muromtsevo (Russian: Муромцево) is a rural locality (a settlement) and the administrative center of Muromtsevskoye Rural Settlement, Sudogodsky District, Vladimir Oblast, Russia. The population was 3,019 as of 2010. There are 27 streets.

== Geography ==
Muromtsevo is located 5 km southeast of Sudogda (the district's administrative centre) by road. Gorki is the nearest rural locality.
