= Novovarshavsky District =

Novovarshavsky District Нововаршавский район
- District
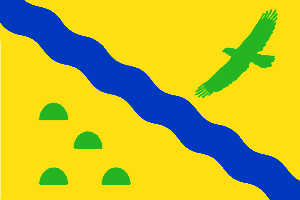
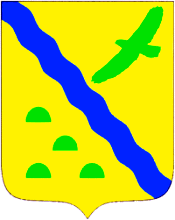
- Flag Coat of arms
- Location of Novovarshavsky District in Omsk Oblast
- Coordinates: 54°10′13″N 74°41′50″E
- Country: Russia
- Federal subject: Omsk Oblast
- Administrative center: Novovarshavka

Area
  - Total: 2,200 km^{2} (850 sq mi)

Population (2010 Census)
  - Total: 24,450
  - Density: 11/km^{2} (29/sq mi)
  - Urban: 39.0%
  - Rural: 61.0%

Administrative structure
  - Administrative divisions: 2 Work settlements, 9 Rural okrugs
  - Inhabited localities: 2 urban-type settlements, 31 rural localities

Municipal structure
  - Municipally incorporated as: Novovarshavsky Municipal District
  - Municipal divisions: 2 urban settlements, 9 rural settlements
- Time zone: UTC+6 (MSK+3)
- OKTMO ID: 52641000
- Website: http://novovar.omskportal.ru/

Novovarshavsky District (Russian: Нововарша́вский райо́н) is an administrative and municipal district (raion), one of the thirty-two in Omsk Oblast, Russia. It is located in the southeast of the oblast. The area of the district is 2,200 square kilometers (850 sq mi). Its administrative center is the urban locality (a work settlement) of Novovarshavka. Population: 24,450 (2010 Census); 27,461 (2002 Census); 28,273 (1989 Soviet census). The population of Novovarshavka accounts for 24.1% of the district's total population.
