= Tevriz =

Tevriz Тевриз
- Urban-type settlement
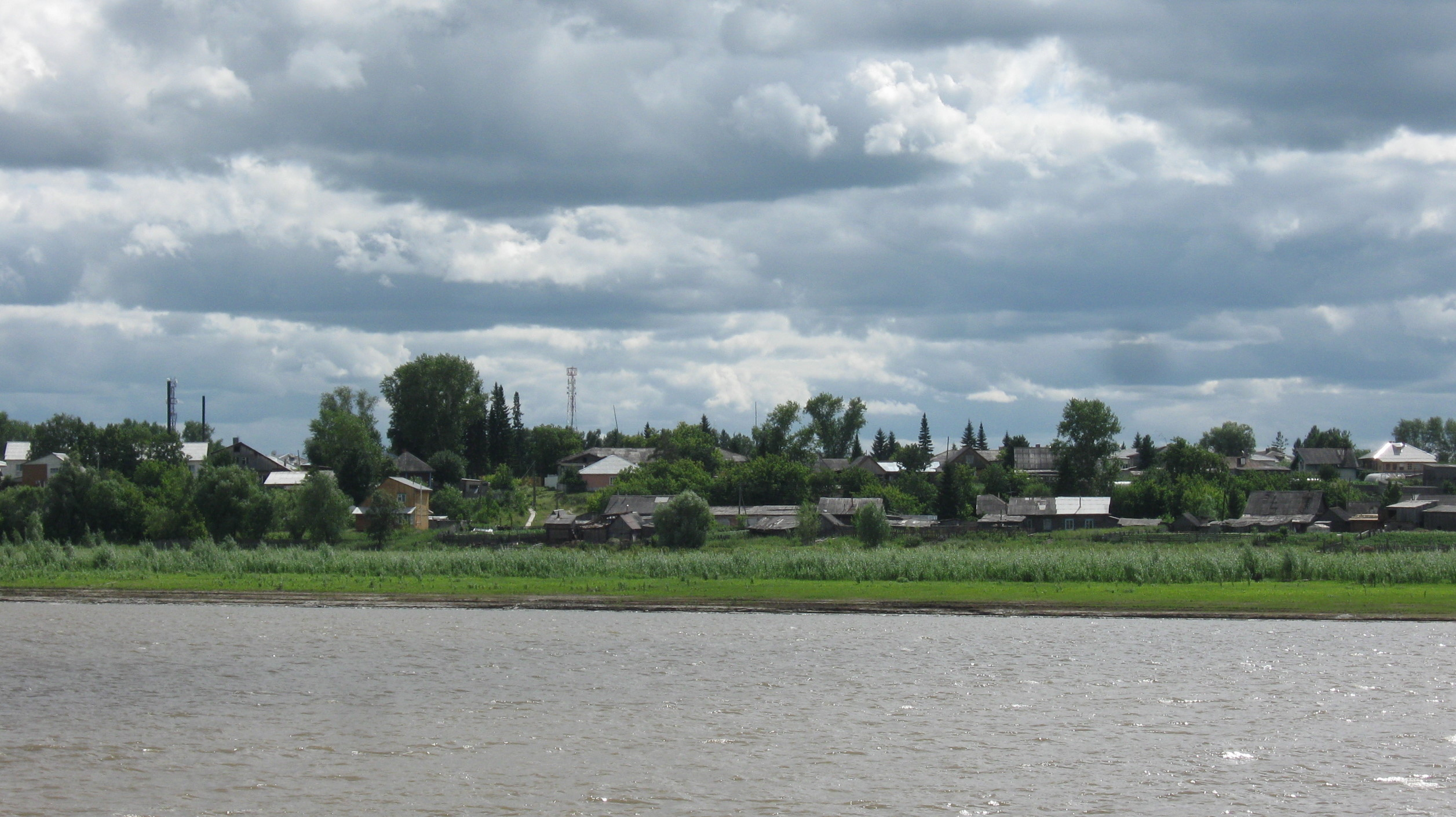
- View of Tevriz in Irtysh

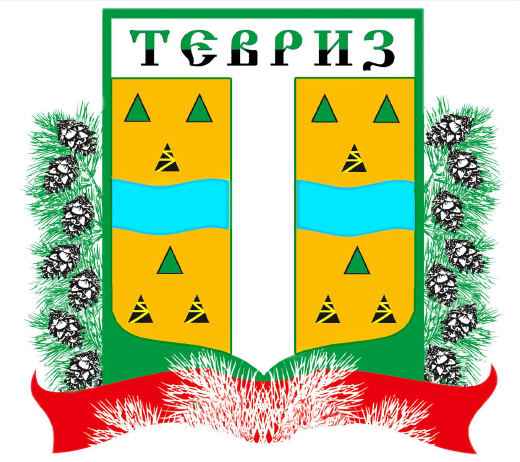
- Flag Coat of arms
- Interactive map of Tevriz
- Location of Tevriz Tevriz (Omsk Oblast)
- Coordinates: 57°31′0″N 72°24′0″E
- Country: Russia
- Federal subject: Omsk Oblast
- Administrative district: Tevrizsky District
- Founded: 1785

Population (2010 Census)
  - Total: 6,986
  - Estimate (2025): 6,678 (−4.4%)
- Time zone: UTC+6 (MSK+3)
- Postal code: 646560
- OKTMO ID: 52655151051

Tevriz (Russian: Теври́з) is an urban locality (a work settlement) and the administrative center of the Tevrizsky District in Omsk Oblast, Russia. Population: 6,986 (2010 census); 7,358 (2002 census); . Tevriz is the northernmost town to reach 40 °C, Reaching 40.0 °C in Jul 11 1990
