= Novovarshavka =

Novovarshavka Нововаршавка
- Urban-type settlement
- Flag
- Interactive map of Novovarshavka
- Location of Novovarshavka Novovarshavka (Omsk Oblast)
- Coordinates: 54.1706°N 74.6962°E
- Country: Russia
- Federal subject: Omsk Oblast
- Administrative district: Novovarshavsky District
- Founded: 1901
- Elevation: 89 m (292 ft)

Population (2010 Census)
  - Total: 5,890
  - Estimate (2025): 5,799 (−1.5%)
- Time zone: UTC+6 (MSK+3)
- Postal code: 646830
- OKTMO ID: 52641151051

Novovarshavka (Russian: Нововаршавка) is an urban locality (an urban-type settlement) in Novovarshavsky District of Omsk Oblast, Russia. Population: 5,890 (2010 census); 6,566 (2002 census); 6,554 (1989 Soviet census).
