= Cherlaksky District =

Cherlaksky District Черлакский район (Russian)
- District
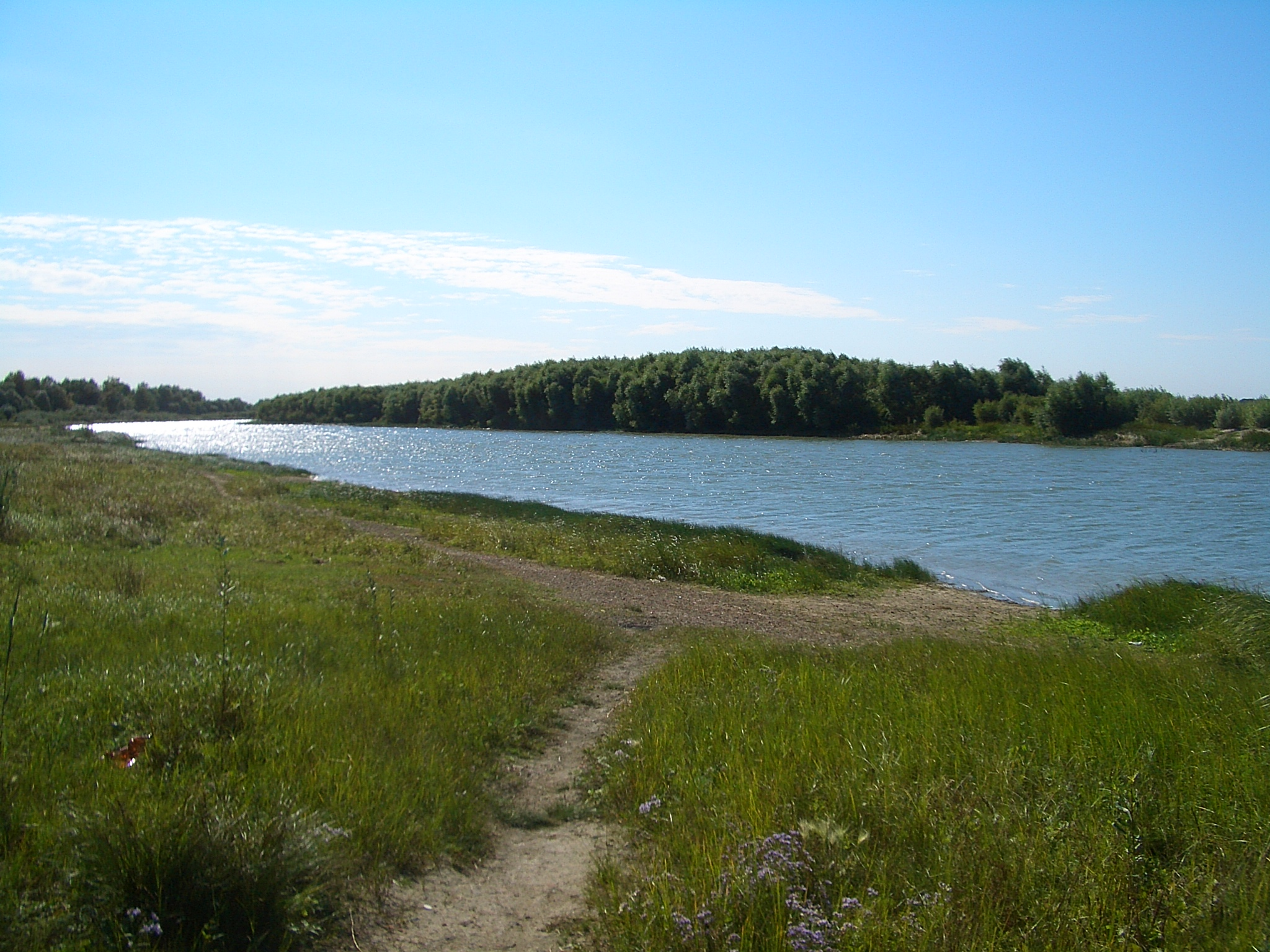
- Irtysh River at Cherlak, Cherlaksky District

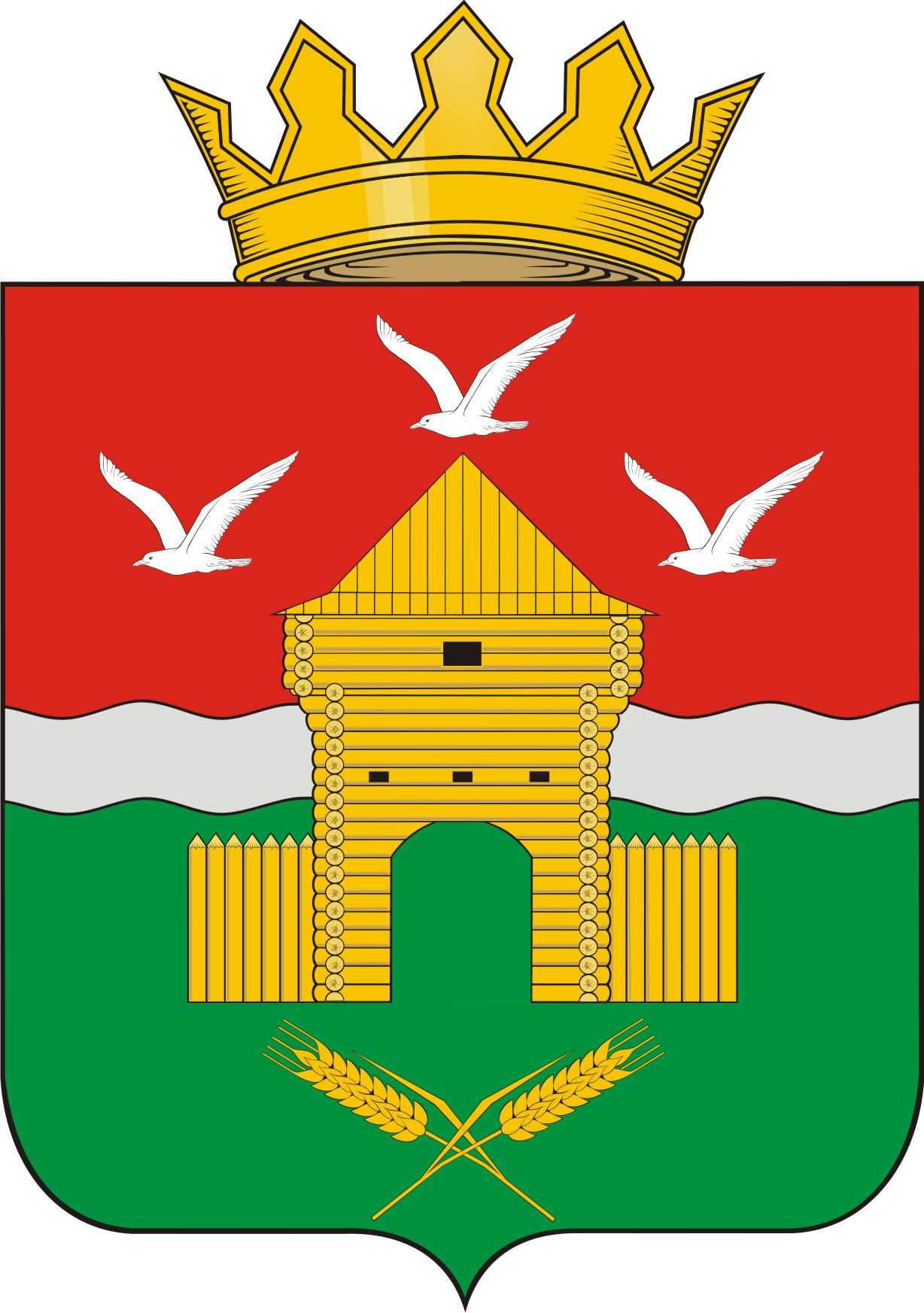
- Flag Coat of arms
- Location of Cherlaksky District in Omsk Oblast
- Coordinates: 54°10′15″N 74°46′00″E
- Country: Russia
- Federal subject: Omsk Oblast
- Established: 1929
- Administrative center: Cherlak

Area
  - Total: 4,200 km^{2} (1,600 sq mi)

Population (2010 Census)
  - Total: 30,344
  - Density: 7.2/km^{2} (19/sq mi)
  - Urban: 36.2%
  - Rural: 63.8%

Administrative structure
  - Administrative divisions: 1 Work settlements, 10 Rural okrugs
  - Inhabited localities: 1 urban-type settlements, 41 rural localities

Municipal structure
  - Municipally incorporated as: Cherlaksky Municipal District
  - Municipal divisions: 1 urban settlements, 10 rural settlements
- Time zone: UTC+6 (MSK+3)
- OKTMO ID: 52658000
- Website: http://cherl.omskportal.ru/

Cherlaksky District (Russian: Черла́кский райо́н; Kazakh: Черлак ауданы, Cherlak aýdany) is an administrative and municipal district (raion), one of the thirty-two in Omsk Oblast, Russia. It is in the southeast of the oblast. The area of the district is 4,200 square kilometers (1,600 sq mi). Its administrative center is the urban locality (a work settlement) of Cherlak. Population: 30,344 (2010 Census); 36,356 (2002 census); 36,662 (1989 Soviet census). The population of the administrative center accounts for 36.2% of the district's total population.

== Notable residents ==
- Artyom Grabovoi (1983–2014), known as The Knyaze–Volkonskoye Maniac, serial killer
