= Muromtsevsky District =

Muromtsevsky District Муромцевский район (Russian)
- District
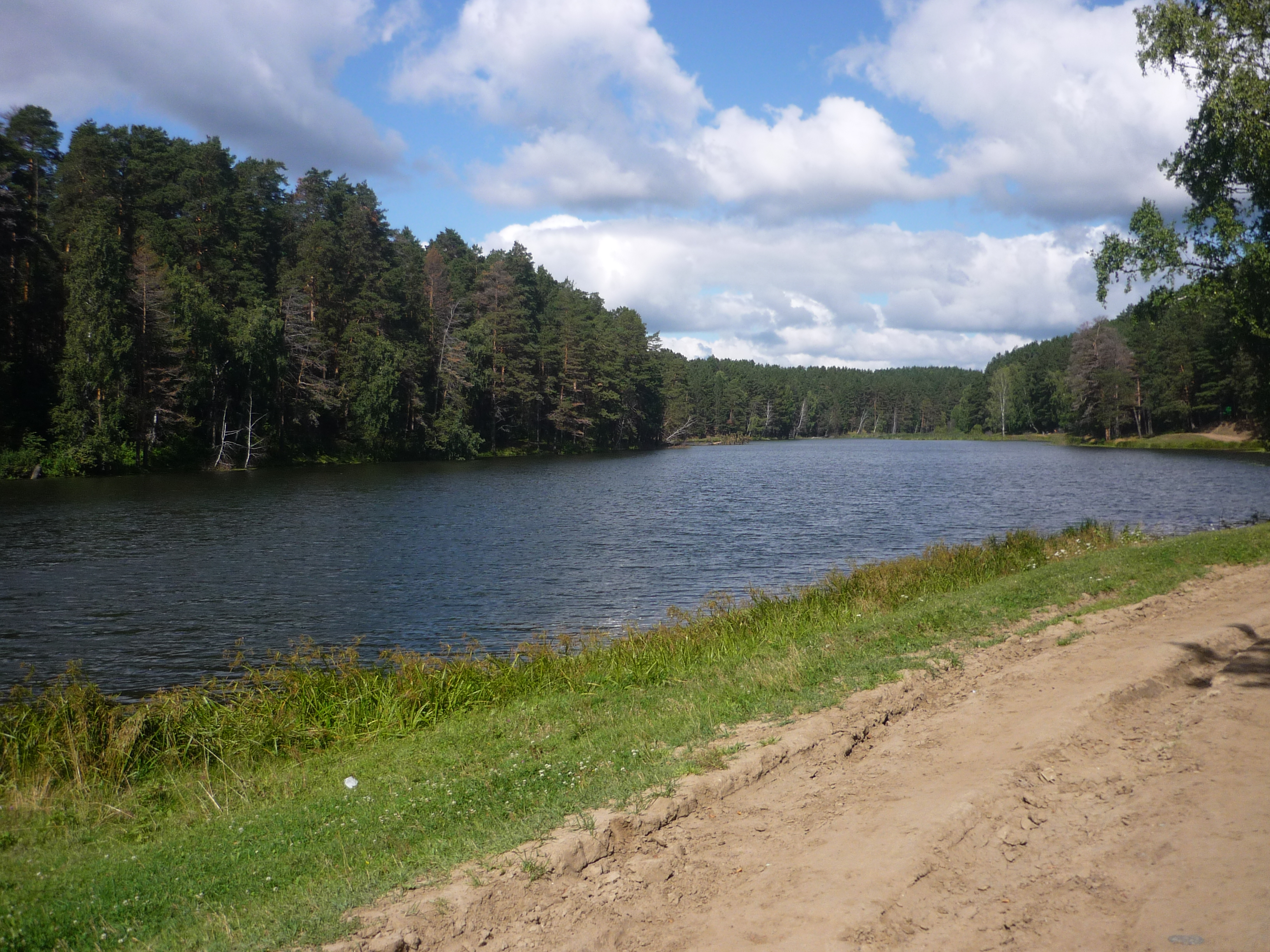
- Dam on the Shaytanka River, Muromsky District

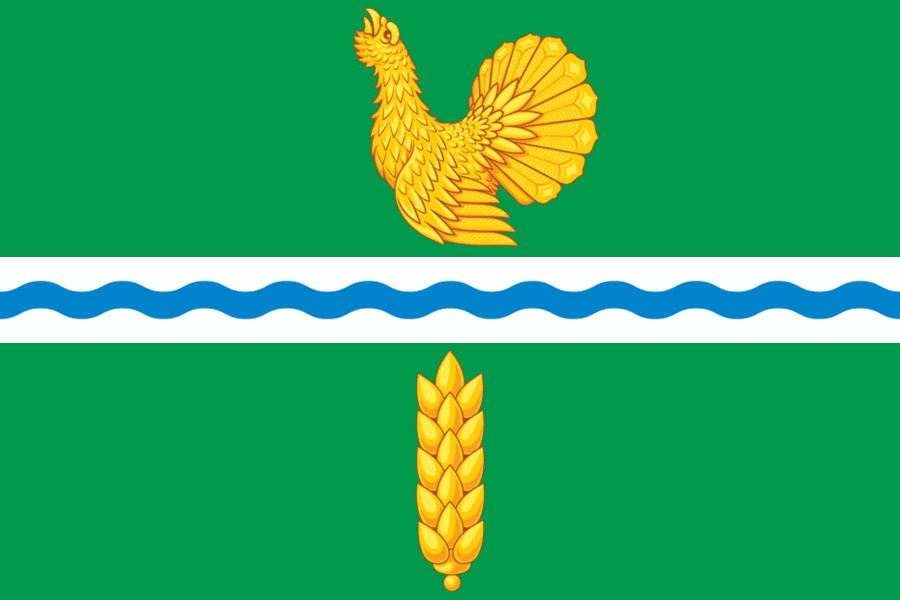
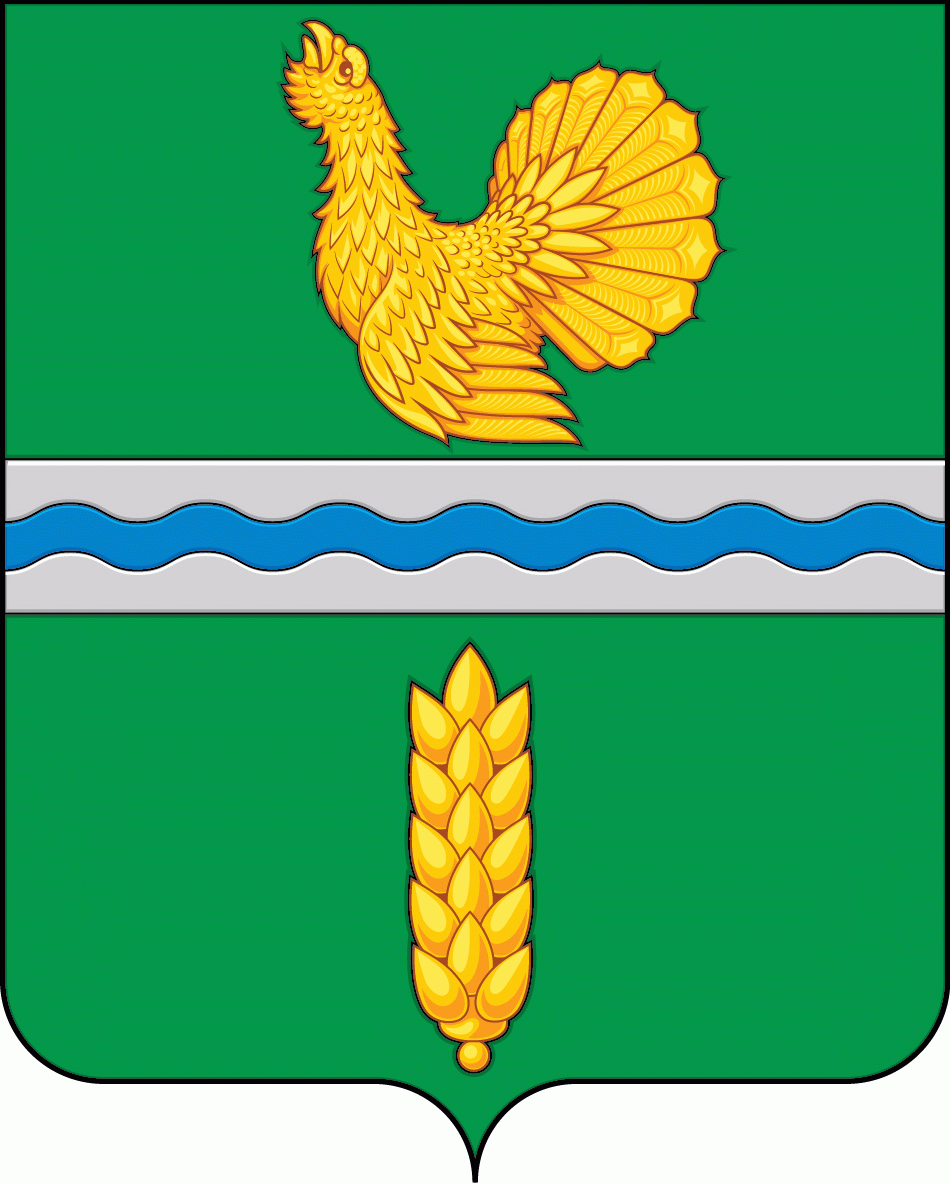
- Flag Coat of arms
- Location of Muromtsevsky District in Omsk Oblast
- Coordinates: 56°22′N 75°13′E
- Country: Russia
- Federal subject: Omsk Oblast
- Established: 25 May 1925
- Administrative center: Muromtsevo

Area
  - Total: 6,700 km^{2} (2,600 sq mi)

Population (2010 Census)
  - Total: 23,795
  - Density: 3.6/km^{2} (9.2/sq mi)
  - Urban: 45.3%
  - Rural: 54.7%

Administrative structure
  - Administrative divisions: 1 Work settlements, 14 Rural okrugs
  - Inhabited localities: 1 urban-type settlements, 55 rural localities

Municipal structure
  - Municipally incorporated as: Muromtsevsky Municipal District
  - Municipal divisions: 1 urban settlements, 14 rural settlements
- Time zone: UTC+6 (MSK+3)
- OKTMO ID: 52634000
- Website: https://murom.omskportal.ru

Muromtsevsky District (Russian: Му́ромцевский райо́н) is an administrative and municipal district (raion), one of the thirty-two in Omsk Oblast, Russia. It is located in the east of the oblast. The area of the district is 6,700 square kilometers (2,600 sq mi). Its administrative center is the urban locality (a work settlement) of Muromtsevo. Population: 23,795 (2010 Census); 28,380 (2002 census); 31,935 (1989 Soviet census). The population of Muromtsevo accounts for 45.3% of the district's total population.
