= Cherlak, Cherlaksky District, Omsk Oblast =

Cherlak Черлак
- Urban-type settlement
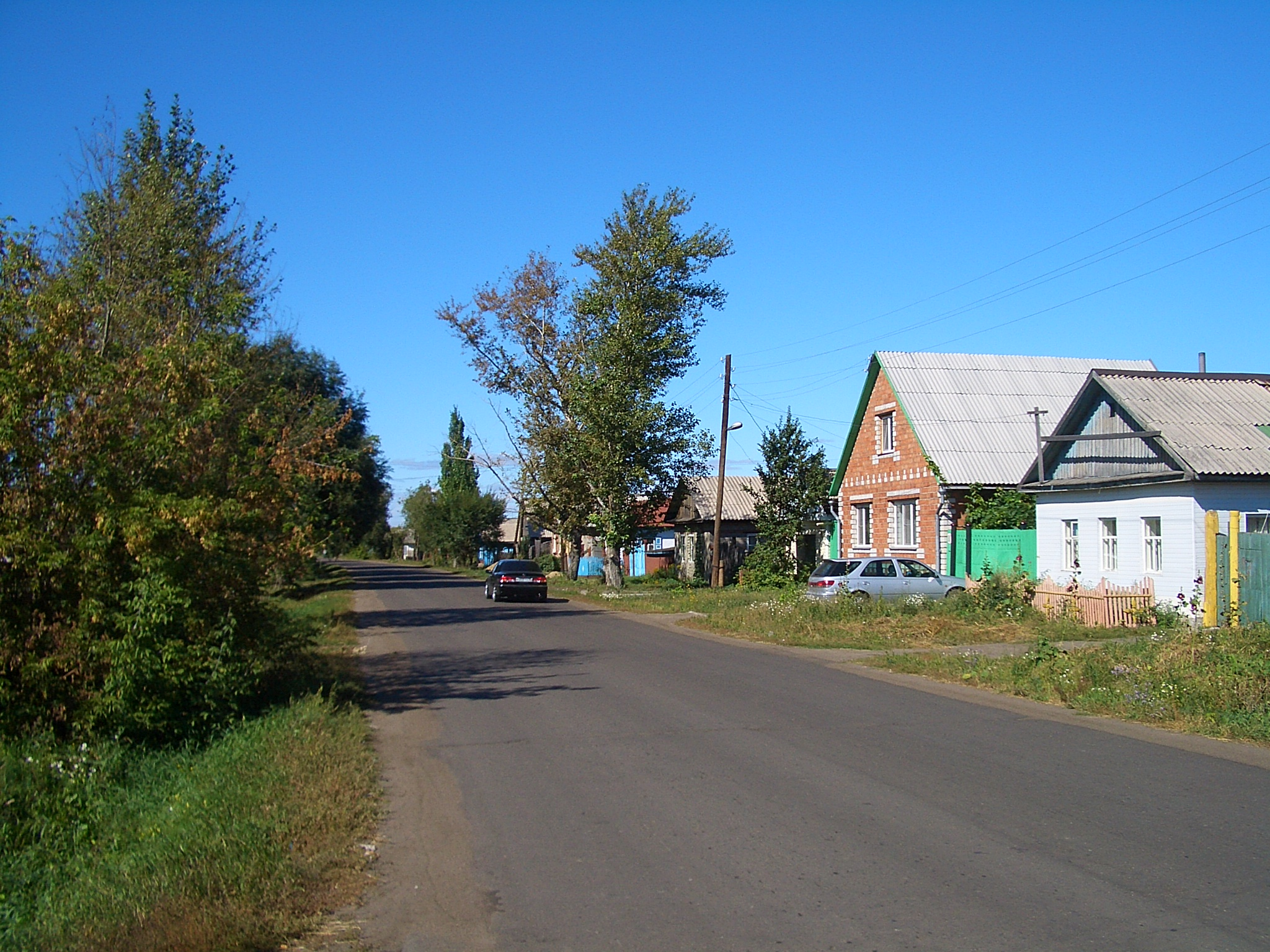
- A street in Cherlak

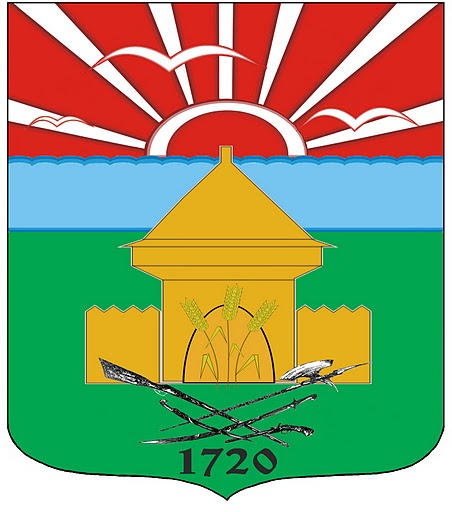
- Flag Coat of arms
- Interactive map of Cherlak
- Location of Cherlak Cherlak (Omsk Oblast)
- Coordinates: 54°9′12″N 74°48′3″E
- Country: Russia
- Federal subject: Omsk Oblast
- Administrative district: Cherlaksky District
- Founded: 1720
- Elevation: 108 m (354 ft)

Population (2010 Census)
  - Total: 10,980
  - Estimate (2025): 9,665 (−12%)
- Time zone: UTC+6 (MSK+3)
- Postal code: 646250
- OKTMO ID: 52658151051

Cherlak (Russian: Черлак; Kazakh: Черлак, Cherlak) is an urban locality (a work settlement) and the administrative center of Cherlaksky District of Omsk Oblast, Russia, located on the right (eastern) bank of the Irtysh River, 140 kilometers (87 mi) southeast of Omsk. Population: 10,980 (2010 census); 12,269 (2002 census); 11,840 (1989 Soviet census).

== Economy ==
The settlement's economy includes various businesses serving the needs of the district, as well as a meat-processing plant.

=== Transportation ===
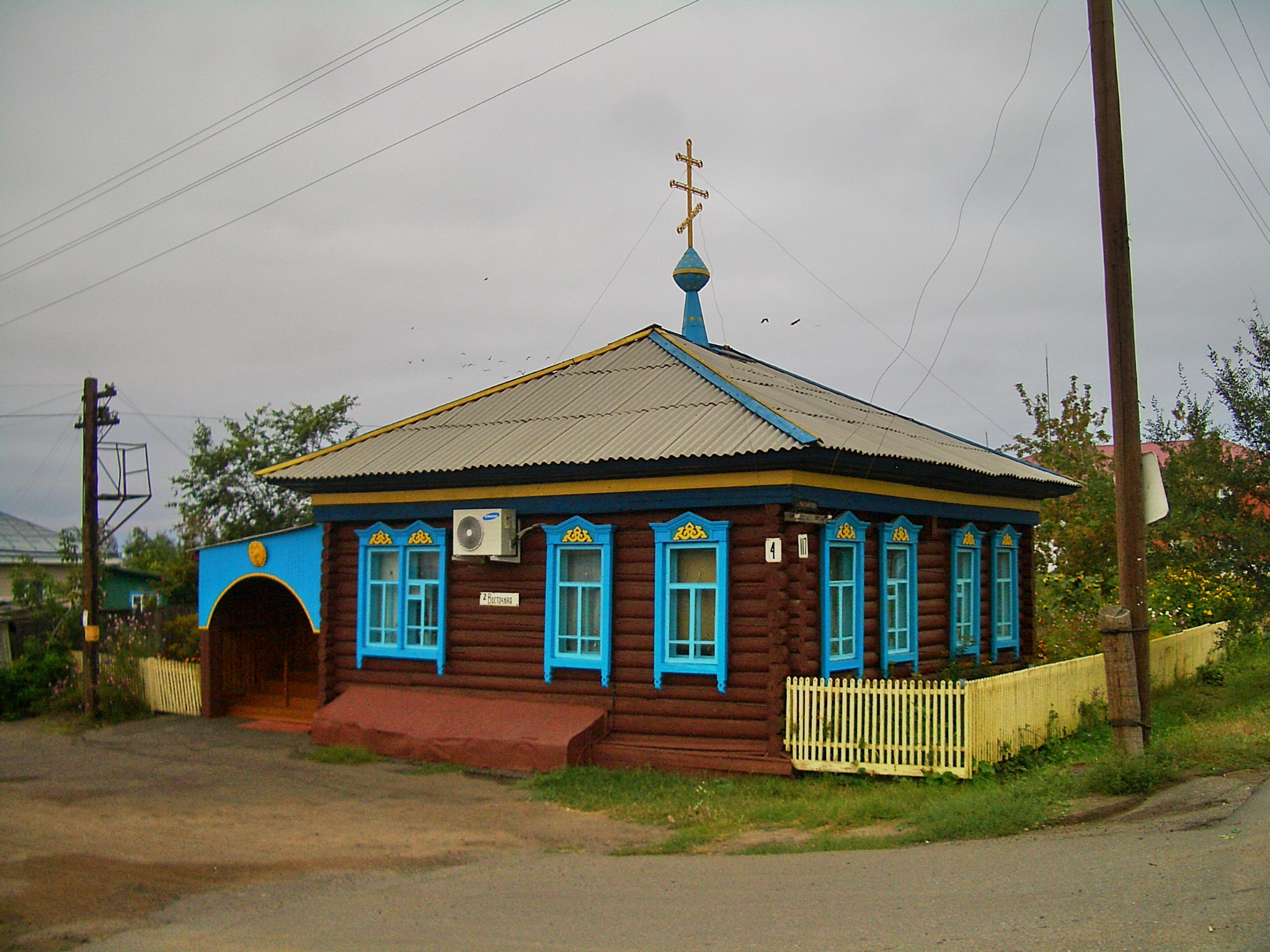
A provisional village church, September 2007 (a new stone church was under construction nearby)

Cherlak sits next to the Omsk–Pavlodar autoroute, which provides the primary way of access to the village. Regular bus and "routed taxi" service connects the village to Omsk.

The railroad station most easily accessible from the village, and also named Cherlak, located 40 kilometers (25 mi) further southeast along the same autoroute, is served by few passenger trains, and is rarely used by the villagers.
