= Okoneshnikovo =

Okoneshnikovo Оконешниково
- Urban-type settlement
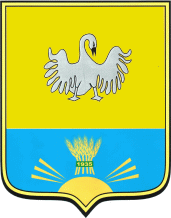
- Flag Coat of arms
- Interactive map of Okoneshnikovo
- Location of Okoneshnikovo Okoneshnikovo (Omsk Oblast)
- Coordinates: 54.8377°N 75.0754°E
- Country: Russia
- Federal subject: Omsk Oblast
- Administrative district: Okoneshnikovsky District
- Founded: 1813

Population (2010 Census)
  - Total: 5,205
  - Estimate (2025): 4,607 (−11.5%)
- Time zone: UTC+6 (MSK+3)
- Postal code: 646940
- OKTMO ID: 52643151051

Okoneshnikovo (Russian: Оконе́шниково) is an urban locality (an urban-type settlement) in Okoneshnikovsky District of Omsk Oblast, Russia. Population: 5,205 (2010 census); 5,568 (2002 census); 6,158 (1989 Soviet census).
