= Pavlogradsky District =

Pavlogradsky District Павлоградский район (Russian)
- District
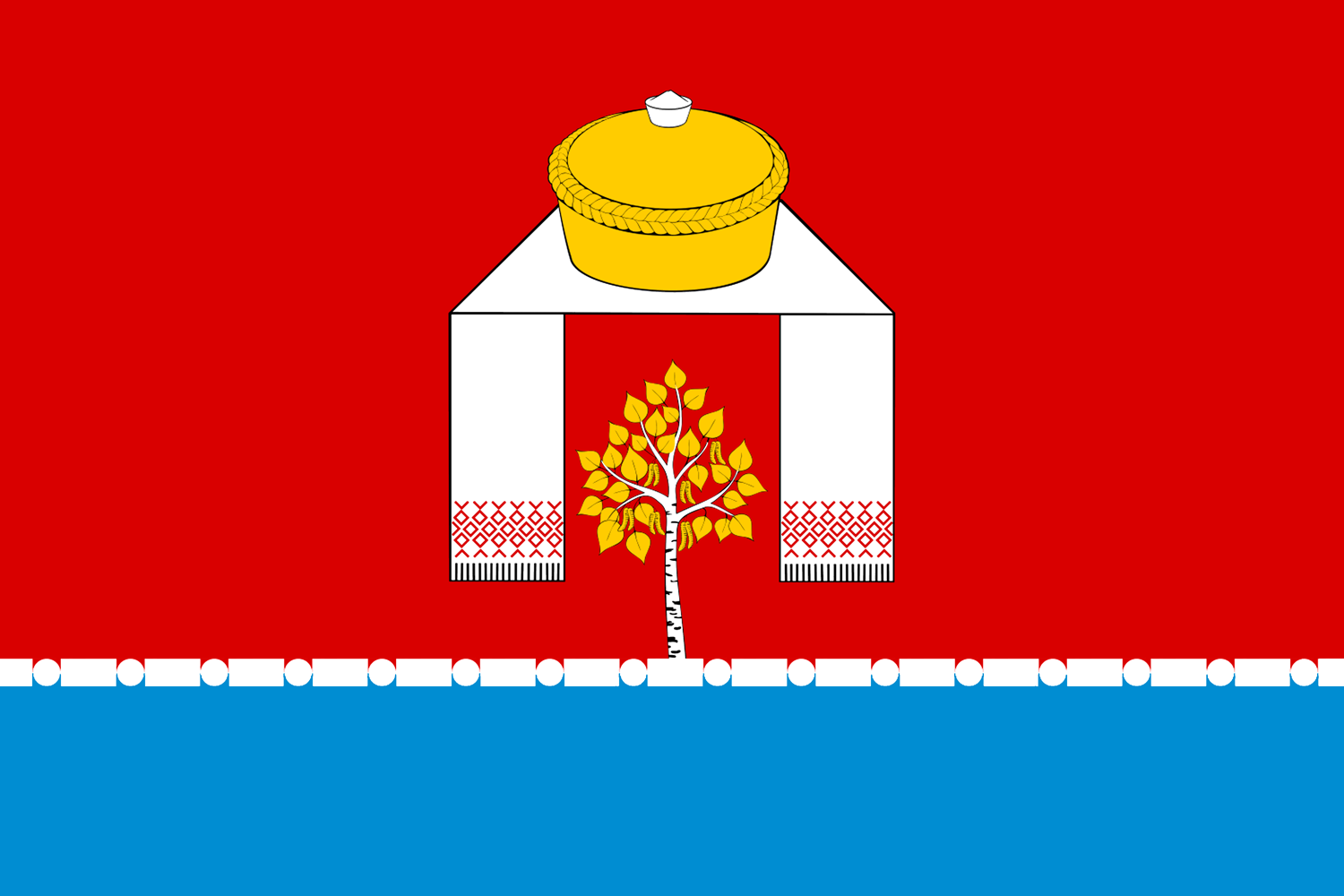
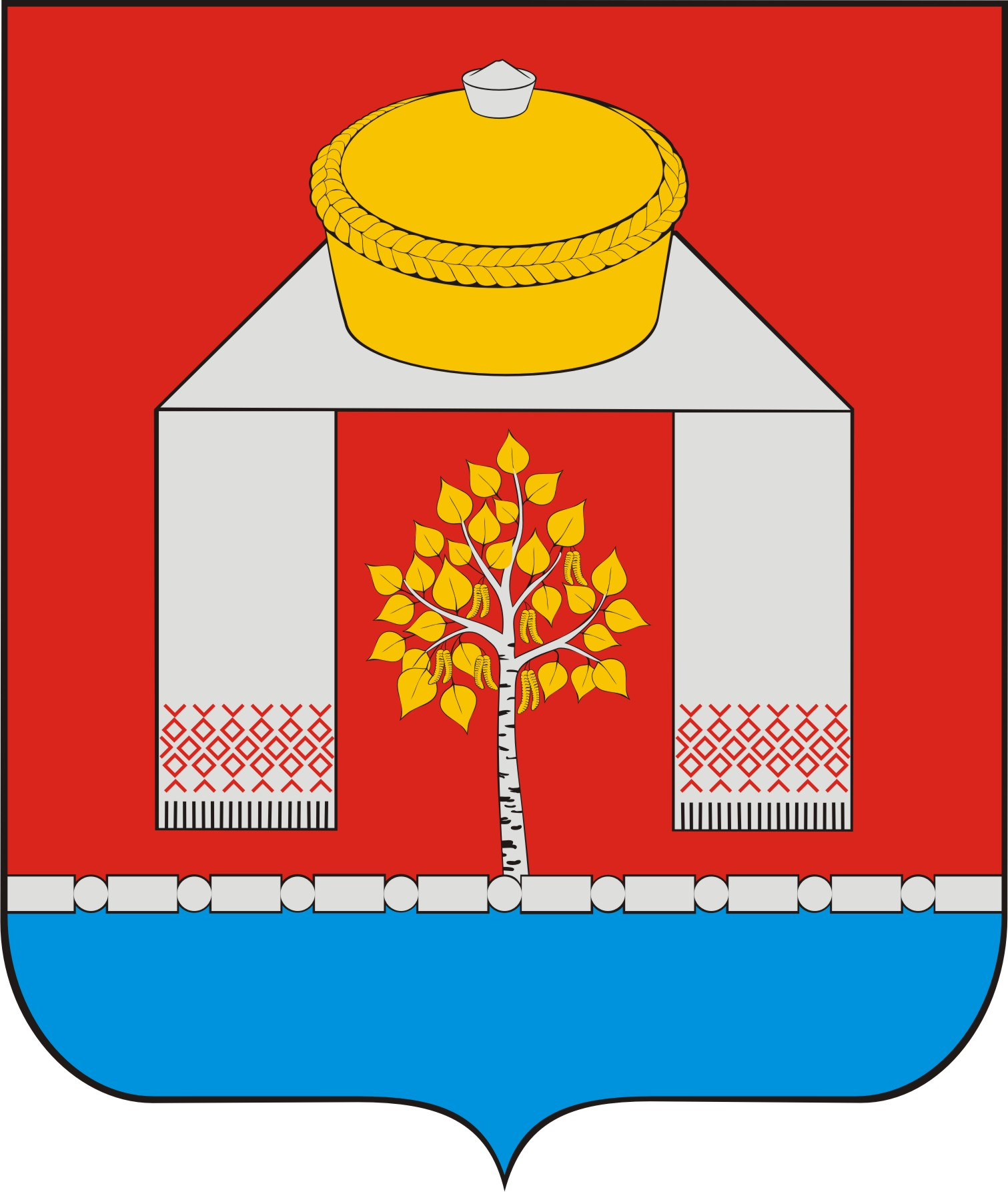
- Flag Coat of arms
- Location of Pavlogradsky District in Omsk Oblast
- Coordinates: 54°12′N 73°33′E
- Country: Russia
- Federal subject: Omsk Oblast
- Established: 25 May 1925
- Administrative center: Pavlogradka

Area
  - Total: 2,500 km^{2} (970 sq mi)

Population (2010 Census)
  - Total: 20,034
  - Density: 8.0/km^{2} (21/sq mi)
  - Urban: 37.8%
  - Rural: 62.2%

Administrative structure
  - Administrative divisions: 1 Work settlements, 9 Rural okrugs
  - Inhabited localities: 1 urban-type settlements, 32 rural localities

Municipal structure
  - Municipally incorporated as: Pavlogradsky Municipal District
  - Municipal divisions: 1 urban settlements, 9 rural settlements
- Time zone: UTC+6 (MSK+3)
- OKTMO ID: 52646000
- Website: http://www.pavlograd.omskportal.ru/

Pavlogradsky District (Russian: Павлогра́дский райо́н) is an administrative and municipal district (raion), one of the thirty-two in Omsk Oblast, Russia. It is located in the south of the oblast. The area of the district is 2,500 square kilometers (970 sq mi). Its administrative center is the urban locality (a work settlement) of Pavlogradka. Population: 20,034 (2010 Census); 21,608 (2002 Census); 23,037 (1989 Soviet census). The population of Pavlogradka accounts for 37.8% of the district's total population.
