= Krutinka =

Krutinka Крутинка
- Urban-type settlement
- Interactive map of Krutinka
- Location of Krutinka Krutinka (Omsk Oblast)
- Coordinates: 56°0′23″N 71°30′41″E
- Country: Russia
- Federal subject: Omsk Oblast
- Administrative district: Krutinsky District
- Founded: 1761

Population (2010 Census)
  - Total: 7,333
  - Estimate (2025): 6,619 (−9.7%)
- Time zone: UTC+6 (MSK+3)
- Postal code: 646130
- OKTMO ID: 52626151051

Krutinka (Russian: Крутинка) is an urban locality (a work settlement) and the administrative center of Krutinsky District of Omsk Oblast, Russia, located 170 kilometers (110 mi) northwest of Omsk. Population: 7,333 (2010 census); 7,846 (2002 census); 8,047 (1989 Soviet census).
