= Sherbakul =

Sherbakul Шербакуль
- Urban-type settlement
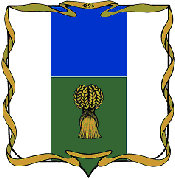
- Flag Coat of arms
- Interactive map of Sherbakul
- Location of Sherbakul Sherbakul (Omsk Oblast)
- Coordinates: 54.6306°N 72.3939°E
- Country: Russia
- Federal subject: Omsk Oblast
- Administrative district: Sherbakulsky District
- Founded: 1893

Population (2010 Census)
  - Total: 6,976
  - Estimate (2025): 6,450 (−7.5%)
- Time zone: UTC+6 (MSK+3)
- Postal code: 646700
- OKTMO ID: 52659151051

Sherbakul (Russian: Шербакуль; Kazakh: Шарбақкөл, Sharbaqkól) is an urban locality (a work settlement) and the administrative center of the Sherbakulsky District in Omsk Oblast, Russia. Population: 6,976 (2010 census); 7,339 (2002 census);
