= Pavlogradka =

Pavlogradka Павлоградка
- Urban-type settlement
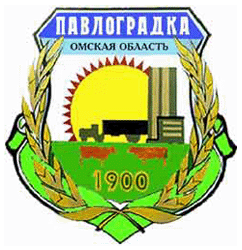
- Coat of arms
- Interactive map of Pavlogradka
- Location of Pavlogradka Pavlogradka (Omsk Oblast)
- Coordinates: 54.2054°N 73.5562°E
- Country: Russia
- Federal subject: Omsk Oblast
- Administrative district: Pavlogradsky District
- Founded: 1898
- Elevation: 119 m (390 ft)

Population (2010 Census)
  - Total: 7,582
  - Estimate (2025): 7,230 (−4.6%)
- Time zone: UTC+6 (MSK+3)
- Postal code: 646760
- OKTMO ID: 52646151051

Pavlogradka (Russian: Павлоградка) is an urban locality (an urban-type settlement) in Pavlogradsky District of Omsk Oblast, Russia. Population: 7,582 (2010 census); 6,223 (2002 census); 7,997 (1989 Soviet census).
