= Russko-Polyansky District =

Russko-Polyansky District Русско-Полянский район (Russian)
- District
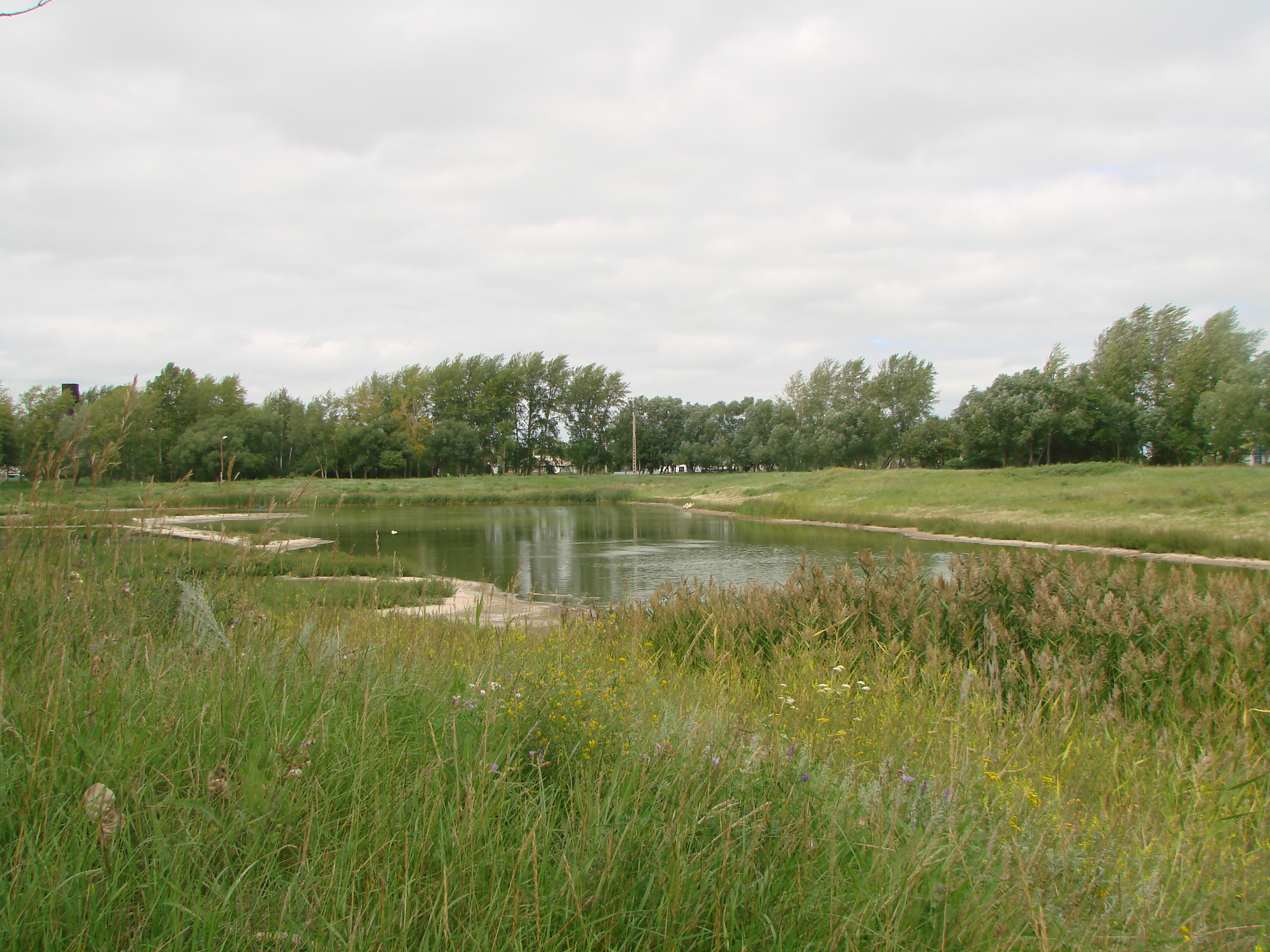
- Landscape in Russko-Polyansky District

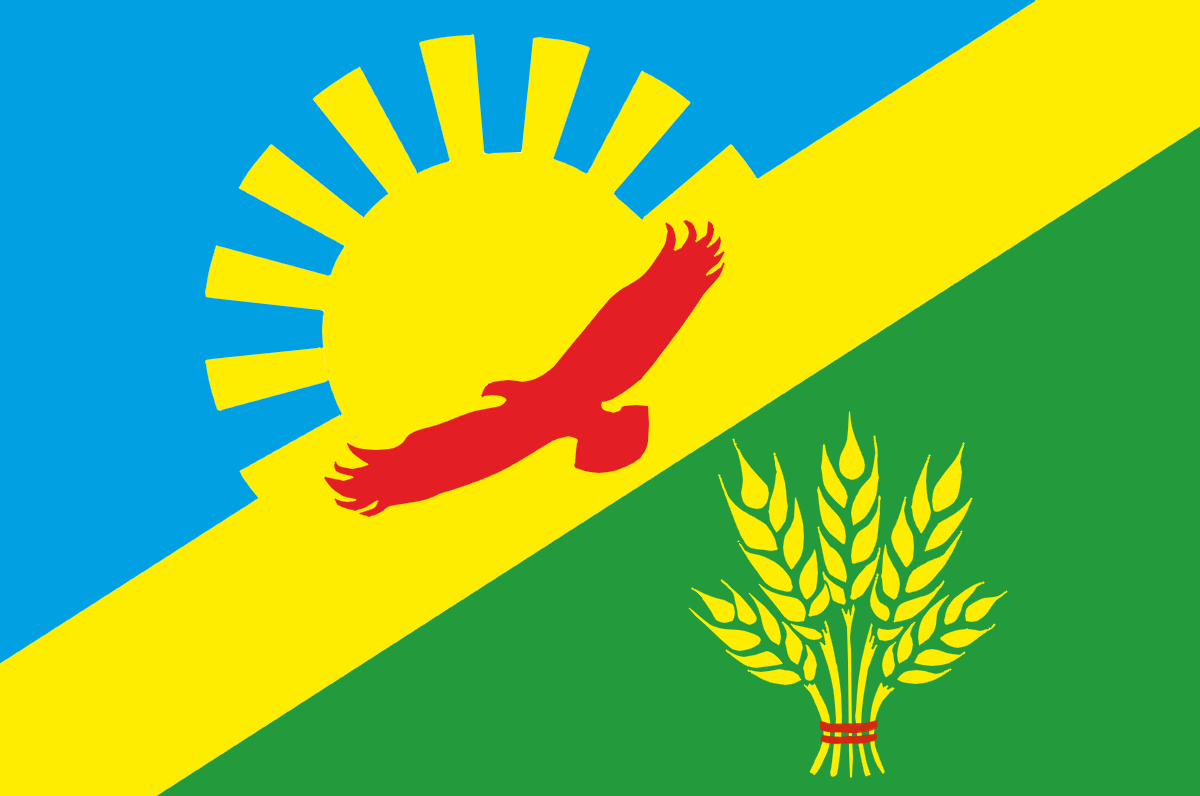
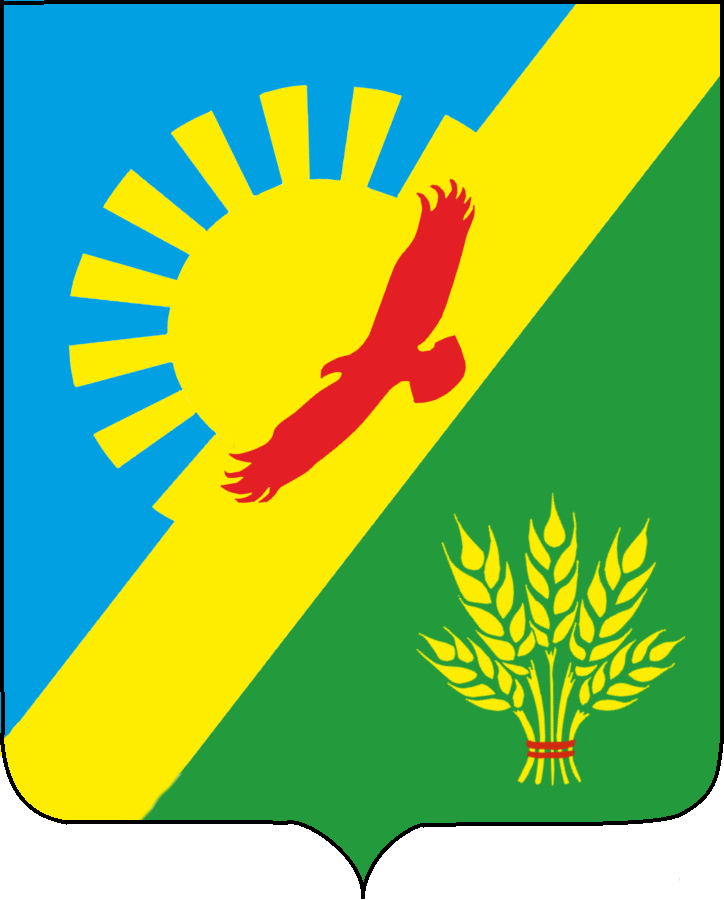
- Flag Coat of arms
- Location of Russko-Polyansky District in Omsk Oblast
- Coordinates: 53°46′46″N 73°52′50″E
- Country: Russia
- Federal subject: Omsk Oblast
- Established: 1935
- Administrative center: Russkaya Polyana

Area
  - Total: 3,300 km^{2} (1,300 sq mi)

Population (2010 Census)
  - Total: 19,333
  - Density: 5.9/km^{2} (15/sq mi)
  - Urban: 30.6%
  - Rural: 69.4%

Administrative structure
  - Administrative divisions: 1 Work settlements, 10 Rural okrugs
  - Inhabited localities: 1 urban-type settlements, 33 rural localities

Municipal structure
  - Municipally incorporated as: Russko-Polyansky Municipal District
  - Municipal divisions: 1 urban settlements, 10 rural settlements
- Time zone: UTC+6 (MSK+3)
- OKTMO ID: 52650000
- Website: http://www.ruspol.omskportal.ru/

Russko-Polyansky District (Russian: Ру́сско-Поля́нский райо́н) is an administrative and municipal district (raion), one of the thirty-two in Omsk Oblast, Russia. It is located in the south of the oblast. The area of the district is 3,300 square kilometers (1,300 sq mi). Its administrative center is the urban locality (a work settlement) of Russkaya Polyana. Population: 19,333 (2010 Census); 24,481 (2002 census); 26,959 (1989 Soviet census). The population of the administrative center accounts for 30.6% of the district's total population.
