= Muromtsevo, Omsk Oblast =

Muromtsevo Муромцево
- Urban-type settlement
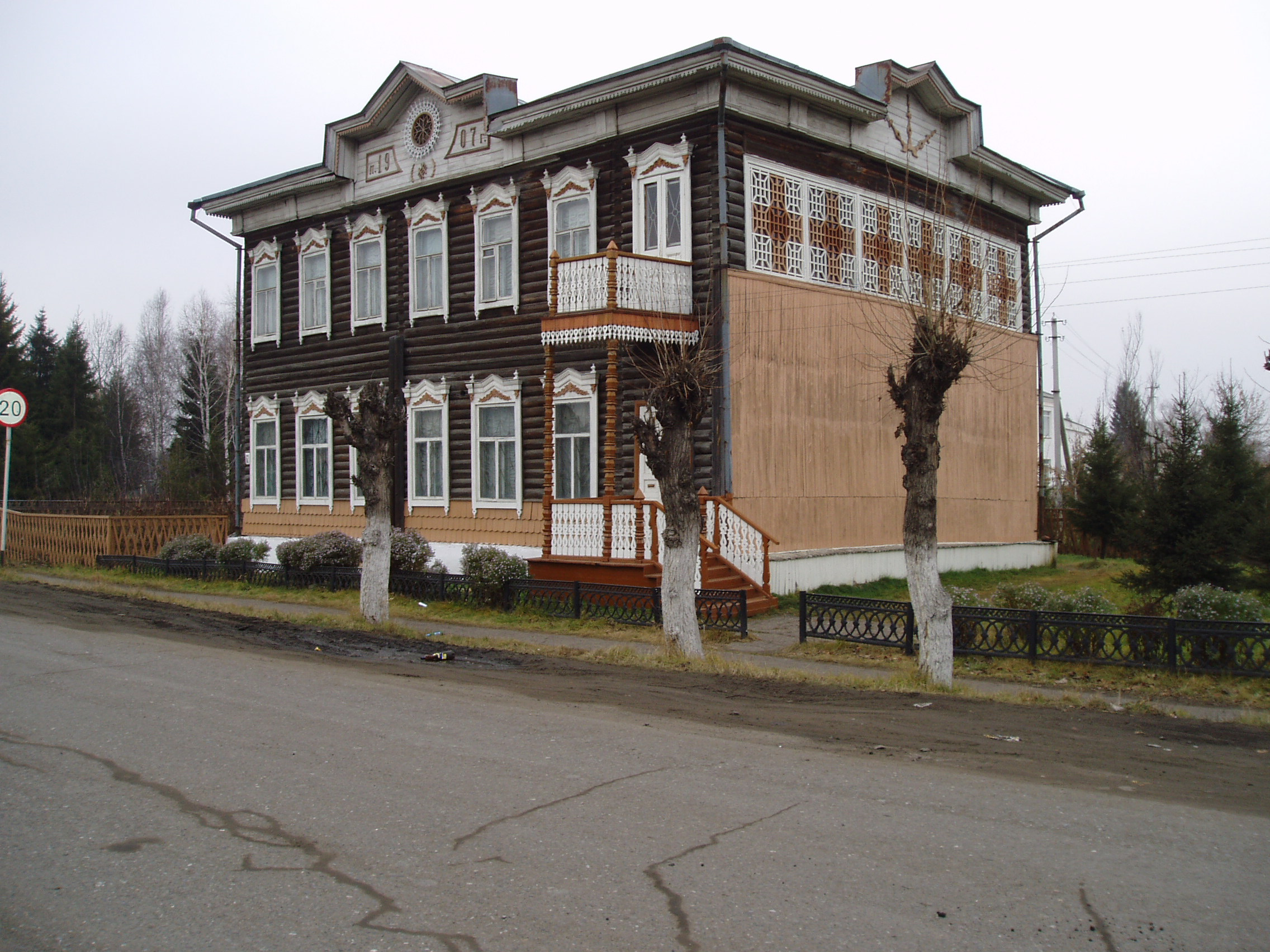
- Muromtsev Museum of History and Local Lore

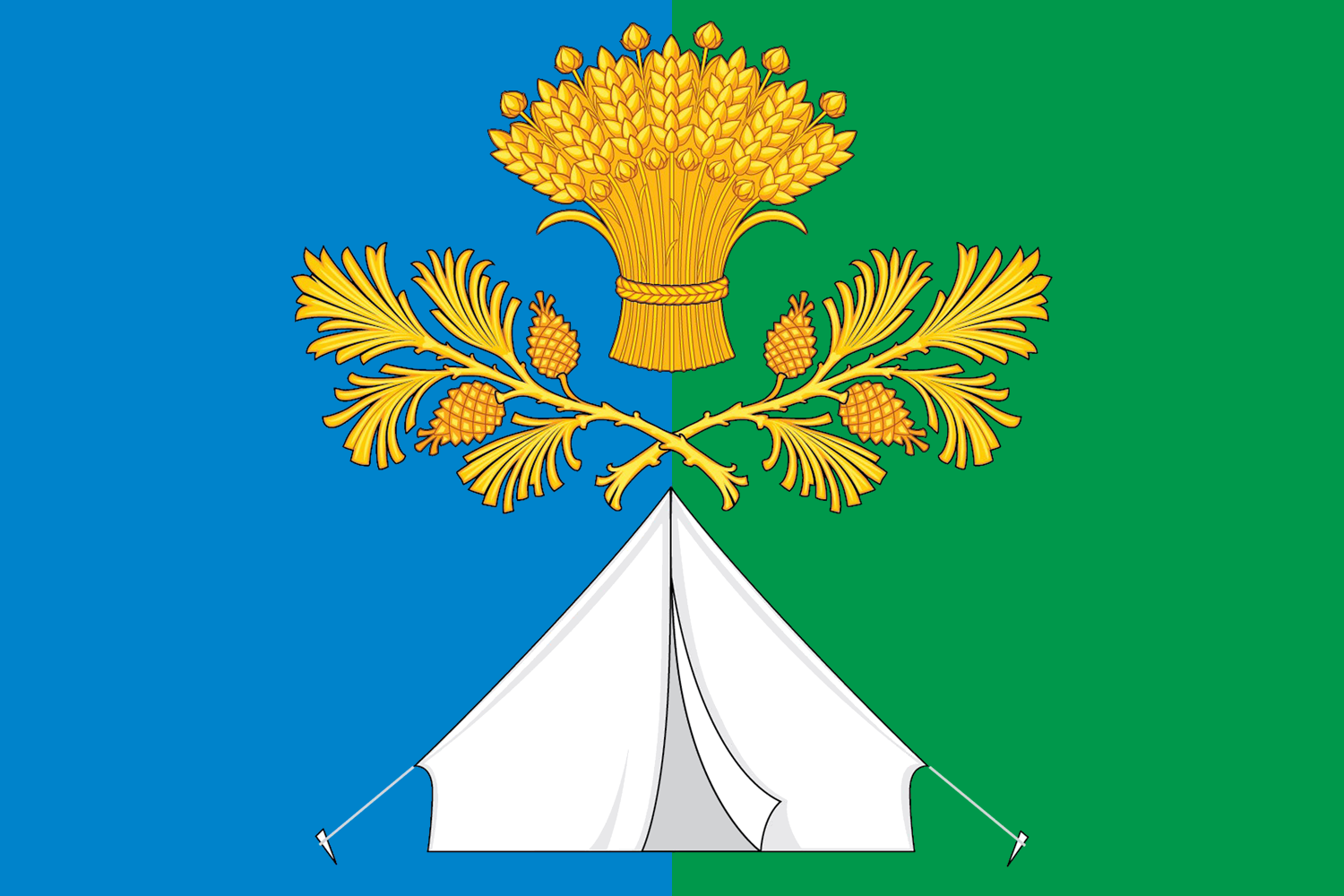
- Flag
- Interactive map of Muromtsevo
- Location of Muromtsevo Muromtsevo (Omsk Oblast)
- Coordinates: 56.3696°N 75.2371°E
- Country: Russia
- Federal subject: Omsk Oblast
- Administrative district: Muromtsevsky District
- Founded: 1717
- Elevation: 78 m (256 ft)

Population (2010 Census)
  - Total: 10,776
  - Estimate (2025): 9,020 (−16.3%)
- Time zone: UTC+6 (MSK+3)
- Postal code: 646430
- OKTMO ID: 52634151051

Muromtsevo (Russian: Муромцево) is an urban locality (an urban-type settlement) in Muromtsevsky District of Omsk Oblast, Russia. Population: 10,776 (2010 census); 11,283 (2002 census); 11,452 (1989 Soviet census).
