= Russkaya Polyana (urban-type settlement), Omsk Oblast =

Russkaya Polyana Русская Поляна
- Urban-type settlement
- Interactive map of Russkaya Polyana
- Location of Russkaya Polyana Russkaya Polyana (Omsk Oblast)
- Coordinates: 53.7796°N 73.8828°E
- Country: Russia
- Federal subject: Omsk Oblast
- Administrative district: Russko-Polyansky District
- Founded: 1907

Population (2010 Census)
  - Total: 5,922
  - Estimate (2025): 6,042 (+2%)
- Time zone: UTC+6 (MSK+3)
- Postal code: 646780
- OKTMO ID: 52650151051

Russkaya Polyana (Russian: Русская Поляна) is an urban locality (a work settlement) and the administrative center of the Russko-Polyansky District in Omsk Oblast, Russia. Population: 5,922 (2010 census); 6,532 (2002 census);
