= Lyubinsky District =

Lyubinsky District Любинский район (Russian)
- District
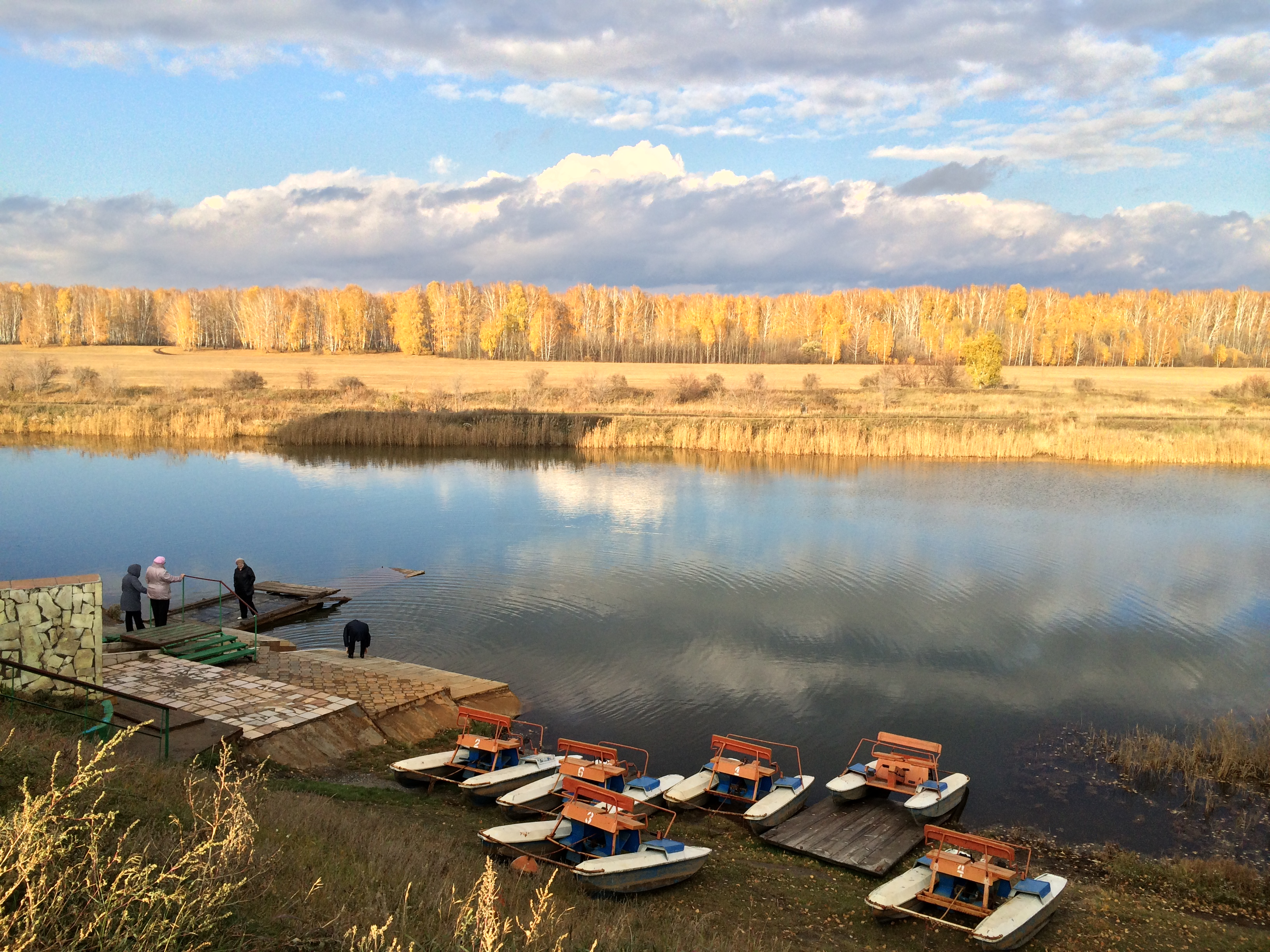
- River on the boundary of Lyubinsky District

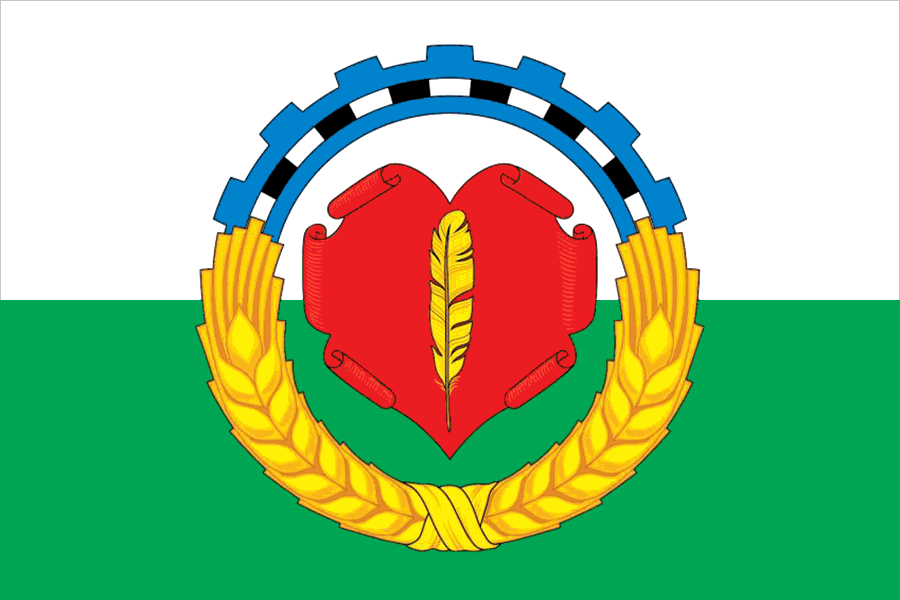
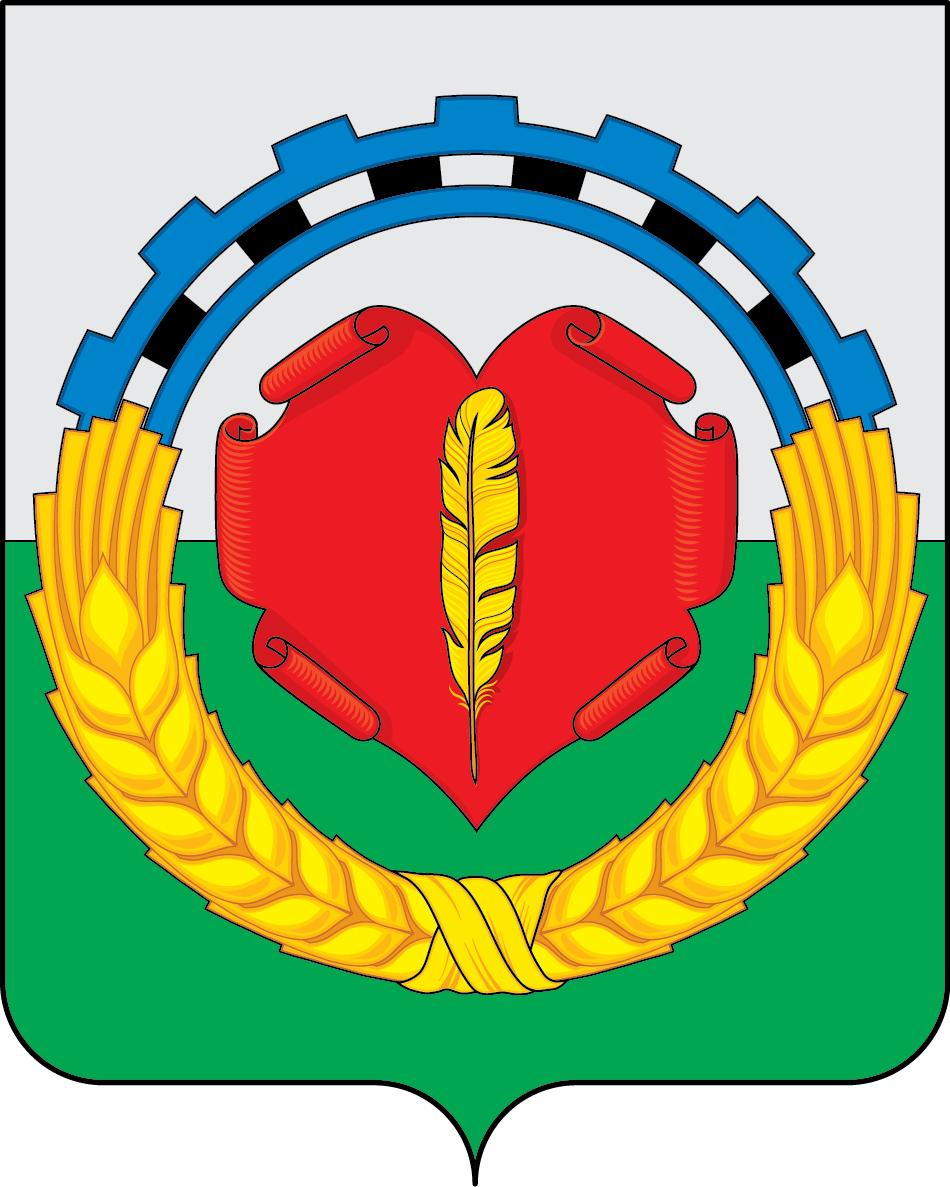
- Flag Coat of arms
- Location of Lyubinsky District in Omsk Oblast
- Coordinates: 55°09′N 72°42′E
- Country: Russia
- Federal subject: Omsk Oblast
- Established: 25 May 1925
- Administrative center: Lyubinsky

Area
  - Total: 3,300 km^{2} (1,300 sq mi)

Population (2010 Census)
  - Total: 37,735
  - Density: 11/km^{2} (30/sq mi)
  - Urban: 40.7%
  - Rural: 59.3%

Administrative structure
  - Administrative divisions: 2 Work settlements, 17 Rural okrugs
  - Inhabited localities: 2 urban-type settlements, 74 rural localities

Municipal structure
  - Municipally incorporated as: Lyubinsky Municipal District
  - Municipal divisions: 2 urban settlements, 17 rural settlements
- Time zone: UTC+6 (MSK+3)
- OKTMO ID: 52629000
- Website: http://lubin.omskportal.ru/

Lyubinsky District (Russian: Лю́бинский райо́н) is an administrative and municipal district (raion), one of the thirty-two in Omsk Oblast, Russia. It is located in the southwestern central part of the oblast. The area of the district is 3,300 square kilometers (1,300 sq mi). Its administrative center is the urban locality (a work settlement) of Lyubinsky. Population: 37,735 (2010 Census); 42,123 (2002 census); 44,283 (1989 Soviet census). The population of the administrative center accounts for 27.1% of the district's total population.
