= Lyubinsky (urban-type settlement) =

Lyubinsky Любинский
- Urban-type settlement
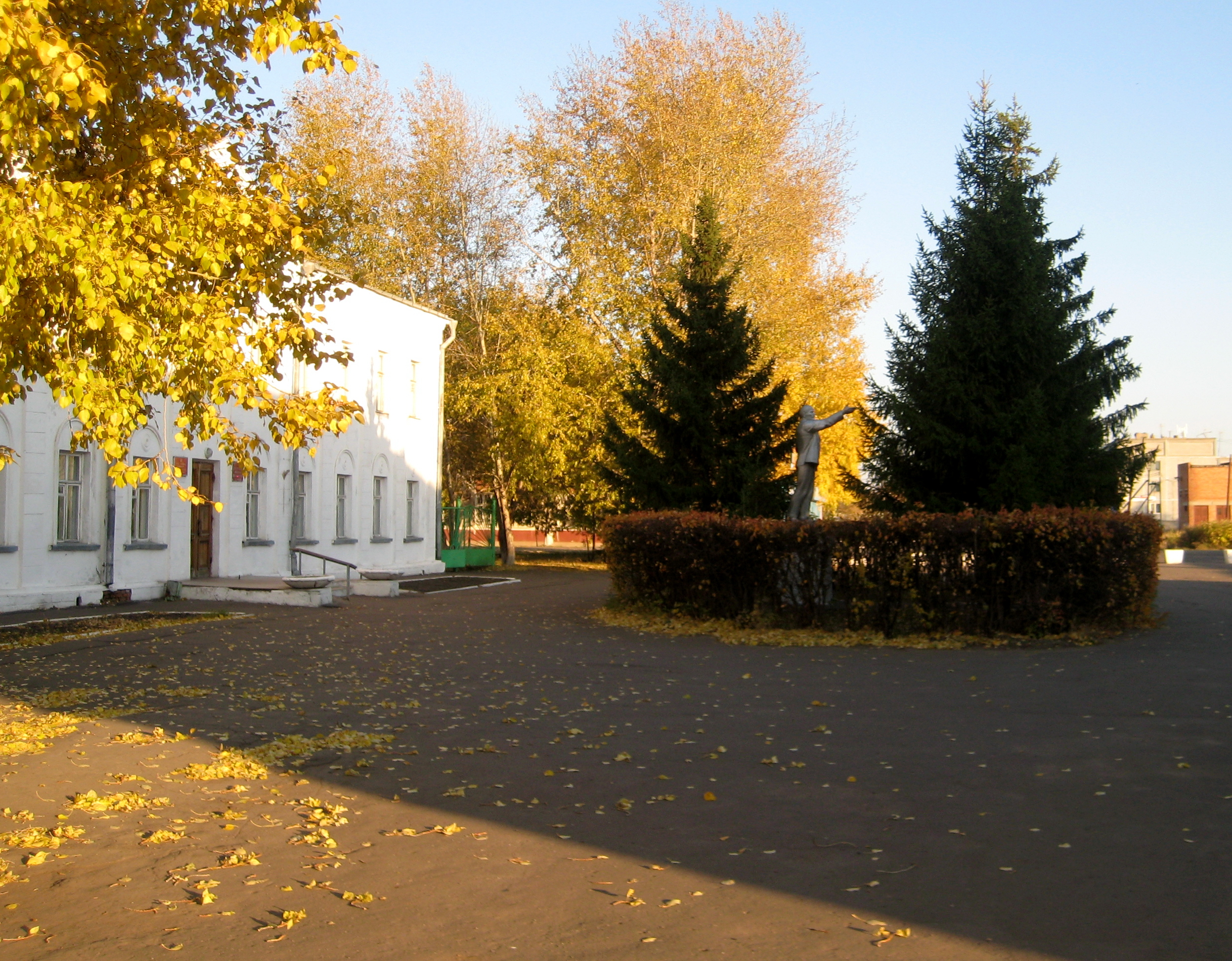
- Music school and monument to Lenin

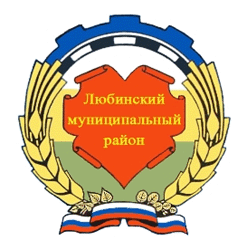
- Flag Coat of arms
- Interactive map of Lyubinsky
- Location of Lyubinsky Lyubinsky (Omsk Oblast)
- Coordinates: 55.1567°N 72.6992°E
- Country: Russia
- Federal subject: Omsk Oblast
- Administrative district: Lyubinsky District
- Founded: 1741

Population (2010 Census)
  - Total: 10,231
  - Estimate (2025): 10,845 (+6%)
- Time zone: UTC+6 (MSK+3)
- Postal code: 646160
- OKTMO ID: 52629151051

Lyubinsky (Russian: Любинский) is an urban locality (an urban-type settlement) in Lyubinsky District of Omsk Oblast, Russia. Population: 10,231 (2010 census); 10,588 (2002 census); 10,881 (1989 Soviet census).

As part of an administrative reform, the rapidly growing station settlement became the administrative center of a rajon on September 24, 1924. In March 1947, it was given the status of an urban-type settlement under its current name.
