= Dubki Park =

Park in Timiryazevsky district, Moscow

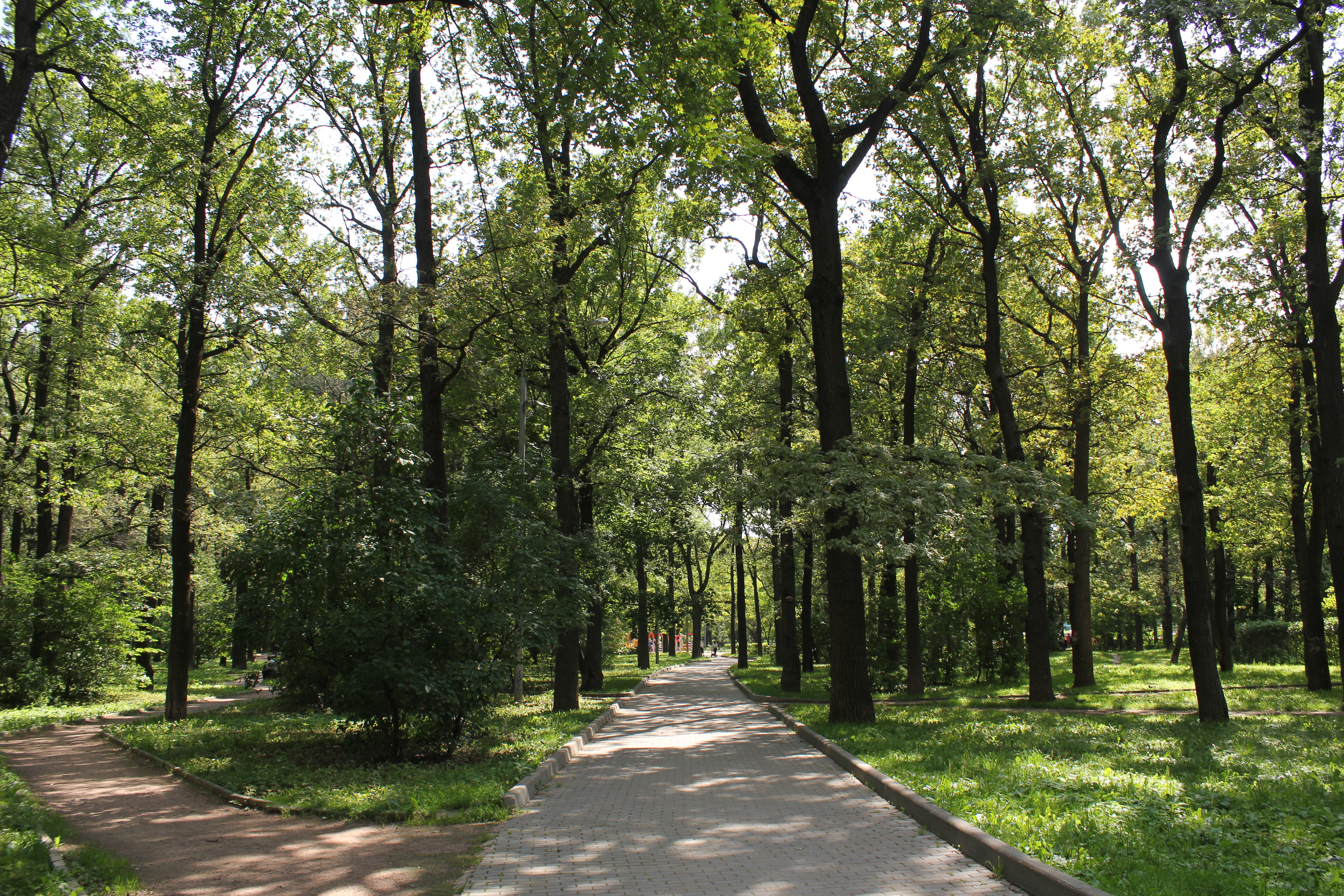
- Pathway in the park
- Interactive map of Dubki Park
- Type: Urban park
- Coordinates: 55°49′14″N 37°33′59″E
- Area: 18 ha (44 acres)
- Status: Cultural heritage of Russia

Dubki Park (Russian: Парк «Дубки») is an urban park located in the northern part of Moscow, within the Timiryazevsky District of the Northern Administrative Okrug. Since 2021, the park has been managed by the State Autonomous Cultural Institution of Moscow "Dubki Park of Culture and Leisure" (GAUK Dubki).

== History ==
Originally, the unnamed oak grove was located near the Petrovsko-Razumovskoye estate and was separated from it by a meadow. In 1861, the land was acquired for the Petrovsky Agricultural and Forestry Academy. As a result, part of the grove was reduced due to redevelopment: roads were constructed, and the land was sold or leased for summer cottages. Locals began referring to the settlement as *Solomennaya Storozhka* ("The Straw Lodge"). In 1862, the grove was considered as one of the possible locations—along with Neskuchny Garden and Presnya—for the construction of Moscow's first zoo, proposed by the Moscow Society for the Acclimatization of Animals. The area was suitable in terms of size and layout, but due to its distance from central Moscow at the time, there were concerns that visitors would not be willing to travel that far.

The name *Dubki* (literally "Little Oaks") was given to the park after World War II. At that time, the grove was at risk of being cut down, but local residents opposed the move and preserved it. A free-layout park was developed, with decorative trees planted, including Maack's bird cherry, Virginian bird cherry, black chokeberry, pomegranate rowan, chestnuts, lilacs, and jasmine. Additional young oaks were also planted, which gave the park its modern name. Gravel paths and alleys were laid, and playgrounds were installed for recreational use.

In the 1980s, plans were proposed to clear the grove for residential construction, but residents again rallied to protect the park.

In 1997, the southeastern part of the park saw the reconstruction of a wooden church originally built in 1915–1916 by architect Fyodor Shekhtel on the site where 4 Dubki Street now stands. The church, dedicated to Saint Nicholas, was named the Church of Saint Nicholas the Wonderworker at Solomennaya Storozhka. It was initiated by Colonel A. A. Mozalevsky of the nearby 675th Tula Infantry Regiment, donor and future churchwarden V. I. Zaglukhipsky, and residents of Petrovsko-Razumovskoye village. The church was built in the style of northern Russian tent-roof churches from the 16th–18th centuries. Shekhtel noted that “the church is designed in the style of northern churches in the Olonets Governorate, except for the bell tower, since in the North the belfries were usually detached from the church; bell towers like this begin in the Kostroma region.” In 1935, the church was closed during the Soviet anti-religious campaign, and its belfry and roof were dismantled. Religious services continued for a short time, after which the building was repurposed as a dormitory. In the 1960s, the structure was completely demolished.

In 2000, to commemorate the 55th anniversary of Victory in the Great Patriotic War, a memorial was installed in the southern part of the park in honor of local war heroes. The inscription on the monument reads: “To the people of Timiryazevsky who gave their lives for faith, the Fatherland, and the people.”

== Attractions ==
The park represents a typical oak grove of the Moscow region. It features a free layout with a well-developed network of paths and trails. The area underwent reconstruction in 1986 and major renovations in 1995, 2007, and 2019.

Among the main attractions are the oak-lined avenue, ponds, and the Church of Saint Nicholas the Wonderworker at Solomennaya Storozhka. The church, constructed in 1997, is a replica of a wooden summer church originally built nearby in 1916. It was designed by architect Fyodor Shekhtel and funded by the 675th Tula Infantry Regiment, its commander Colonel A. A. Mozalevsky, churchwarden V. I. Zaglukhipsky, and summer residents of the Petrovsko-Razumovskoye settlement. The original building deteriorated during the Soviet era and was demolished in the 1960s.

To commemorate the 55th anniversary of the Victory in the Great Patriotic War, a memorial was erected in the park in honor of the residents of the Timiryazevsky District who died on the frontlines.

Two ponds in the park are connected by a narrow (about 3 meters wide) channel, crossed by a wooden bridge. The shores are reinforced with wooden piles.

In summer, the ponds feature working fountains and are inhabited by ducks. The park also includes children's playgrounds, sports areas, and weekend horseback riding.

In March 2016, construction began on a 22-story residential complex called *Timiryazev Park* near the park (19–21 Ivanovskaya Street). The felling of dozens of century-old oak trees triggered mass protests by local residents. The demonstrations were forcibly dispersed by construction security in cooperation with police forces; several protestors sustained injuries. The legality of the construction project is currently being contested in court.

== Renovation ==
The park was renovated under the "My District" urban improvement program, with work completed in 2019. At the request of local residents, it was decided not to alter the layout of the green space but only to update worn-out infrastructure.

Three children's playgrounds with soft rubber safety surfaces were installed, along with three outdoor workout zones—one near the Church of Saint Nicholas at Solomennaya Storozhka, another in the western part of the park, and a third in the northern recreation area. A hockey rink with spectator stands and an equipment rental booth was added, along with three tables for table tennis and newly constructed tennis courts.

In the central part of the park, several iconic features were restored, including the rotunda and colonnade. The pond embankment was improved, and decorative paving tiles were laid around the water area. A volleyball court was set up near the ponds, and a bicycle path was constructed along Ivanovsky Proyezd on the eastern side of the park.

== Gallery ==
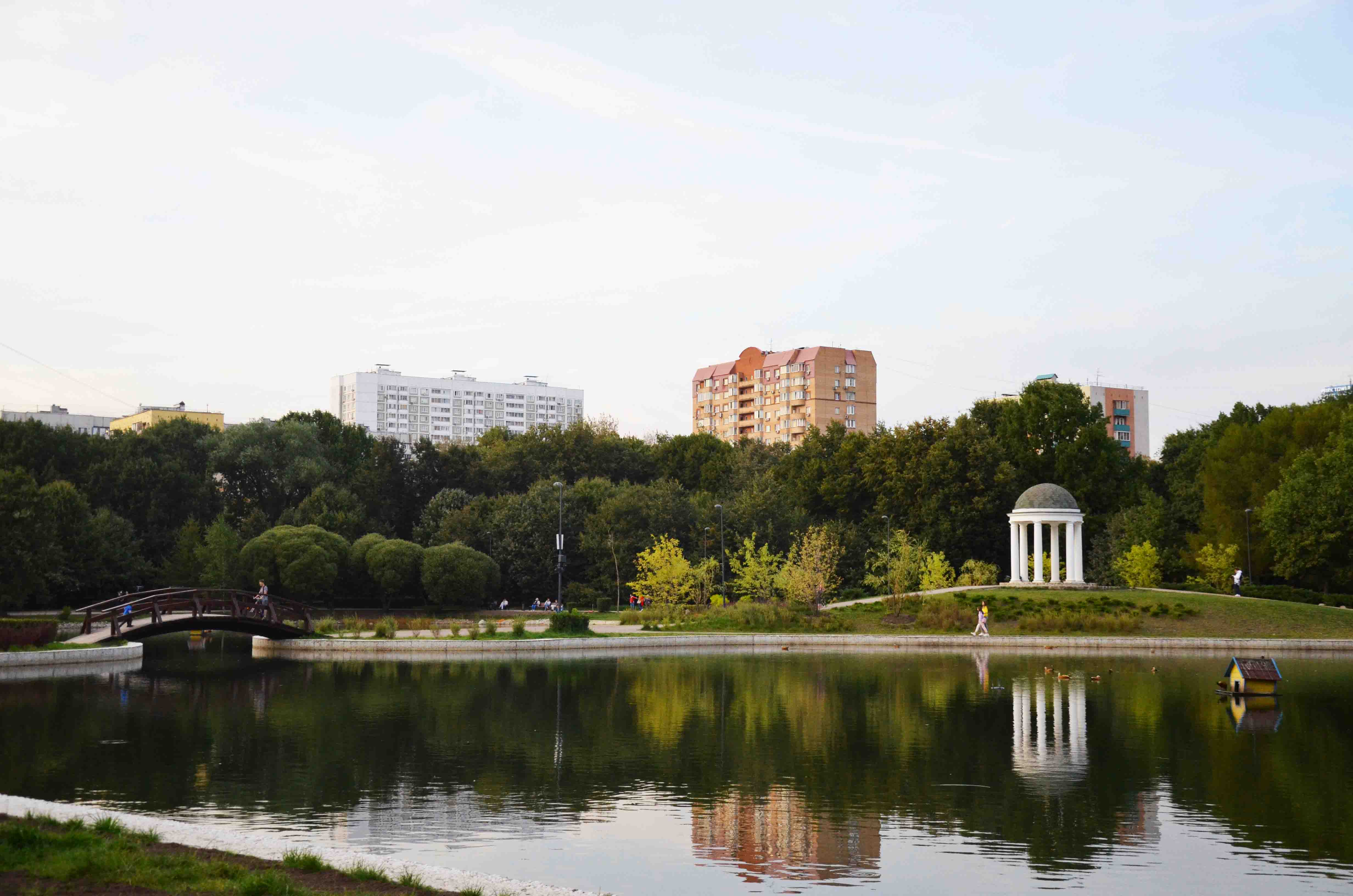
Dubki Park after renovation, 2020

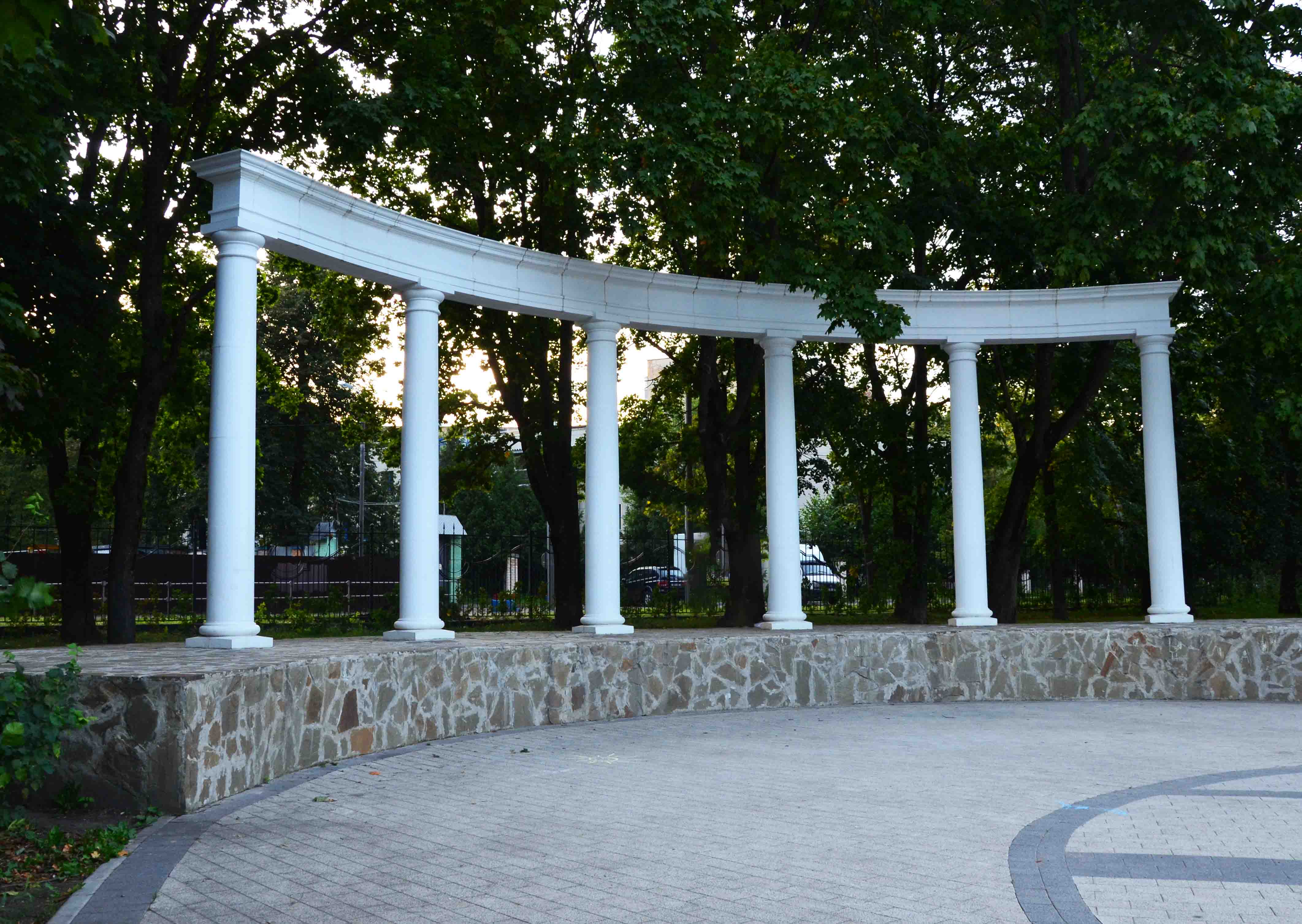
Colonnade in Dubki Park
