= St. Petersburg State Transport University =

Coordinates: 59.9239°N 30.3158°E

Emperor Alexander I St. Petersburg State Transport University
- Петербургский государственный университет путей сообщения Императора Александра I
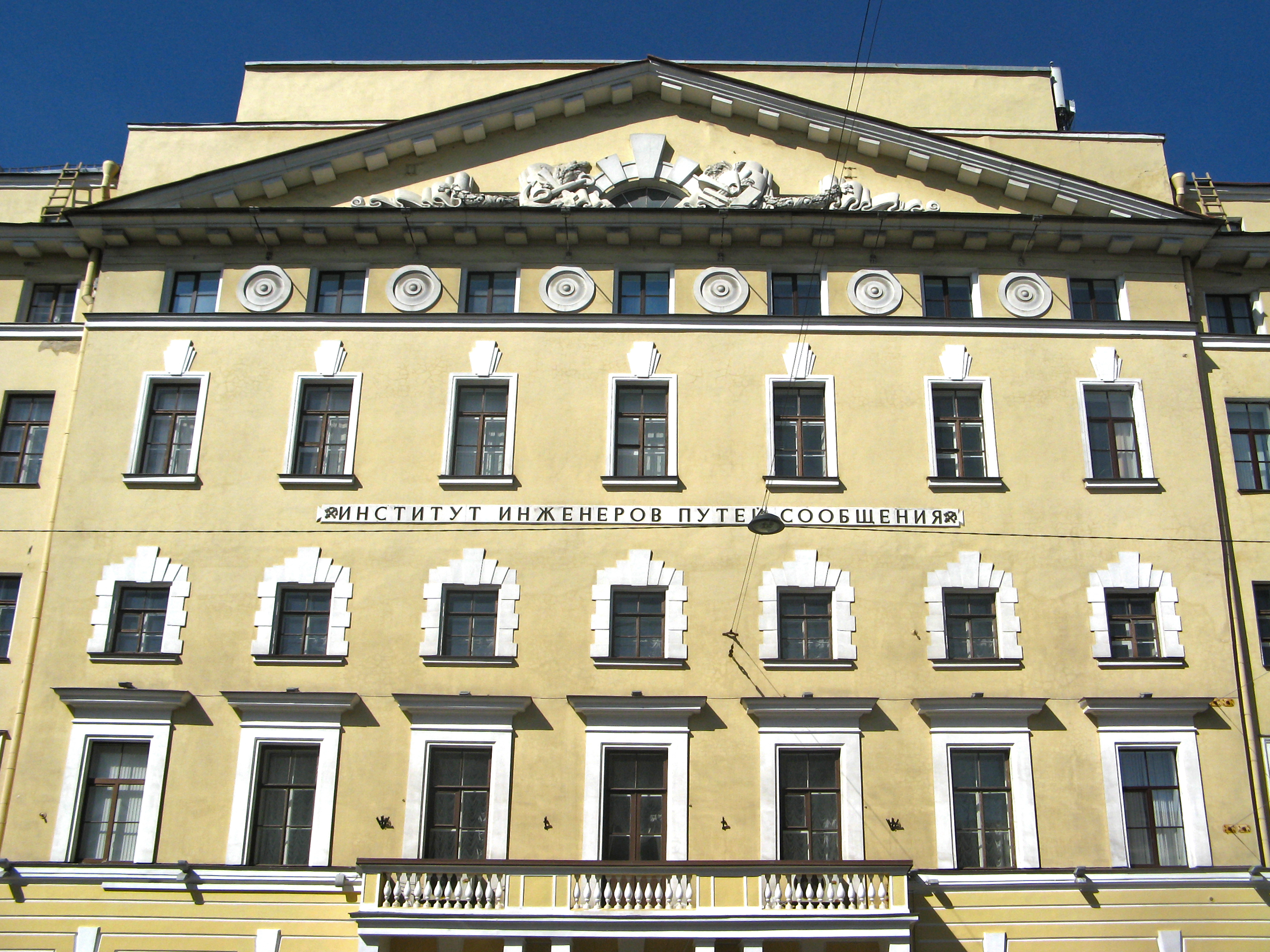
- Established: 1809; 217 years ago
- Rector: Aleksandr Yurevich Panychev
- Location: Saint-Petersburg, Russia
- Website: www.pgups.ru

University rankings

Regional – Overall
- QS Emerging Europe and Central Asia: 351–400 (2022)

Emperor Alexander I St. Petersburg State Transport University (PGUPS; Russian: Петербургский государственный университет путей сообщения Императора Александра I, abbreviated ПГУПС) is a higher education institution specializing in railway transport.

Before 1990 it was known as the Leningrad Institute of Railway Engineers. The main building is located on Moskovsky Prospekt, number 9. The University provides training in specialties and areas of bachelor and master training.

== History ==
Emperor Alexander I St. Petersburg State Transport University was one of the first technical universities in Russia. Its earliest precursors date back to 1798–1809 as a part of the training provided in the Department of Water Communications by Nikolay Rumyantsev.

The University was established on 2 December (O.S. 20 November), 1809, by a manifesto issued by Emperor Alexander I. The grand opening took place on 13 November (O.S. 1 November) 1810. The aim of University establishment was specialized training for construction of land and waterway lines of communication.

== University at the time of de Betancourt ==
The first head of the Institute was Agustín de Betancourt y Molina (1758–1824) as a general inspector. The institution was opened as a cadet corps and was connected closely to the leading institutions of higher education, located in the capital. The ones were the Academy of Sciences, Main Engineering School of Russian Empire and Saint Petersburg State University. The institute was a paramilitary boarding school. Duration of the education course including the gymnasium was 8 years. Graduates obtained the degree of engineer of communication lines and the rank of poruchik or podporuchik.

A museum was founded in 1813 at the Institute (now the Russian Federation Central Museum of Railway Transport).

== Current status ==
In 1993 University was renamed as Petersburg State Transport University (Emperor Alexander I St. Petersburg State Transport University, PGUPS). The University had 11,142 students (as of 2018).

== Traditions ==
Every year since 2016, the State Museum monument St. Isaac's Cathedral hosts a ceremony of awarding diplomas with honors to graduates of the St. Petersburg state University of Railways of Emperor Alexander I.

== Research ==
The research division coordinates the activities and provides administrative guidance to all departments conducting research, organizes fundamental, search and applied research and development work, as well as other types of work related to the implementation of scientific activities of the University.

== Rankings ==
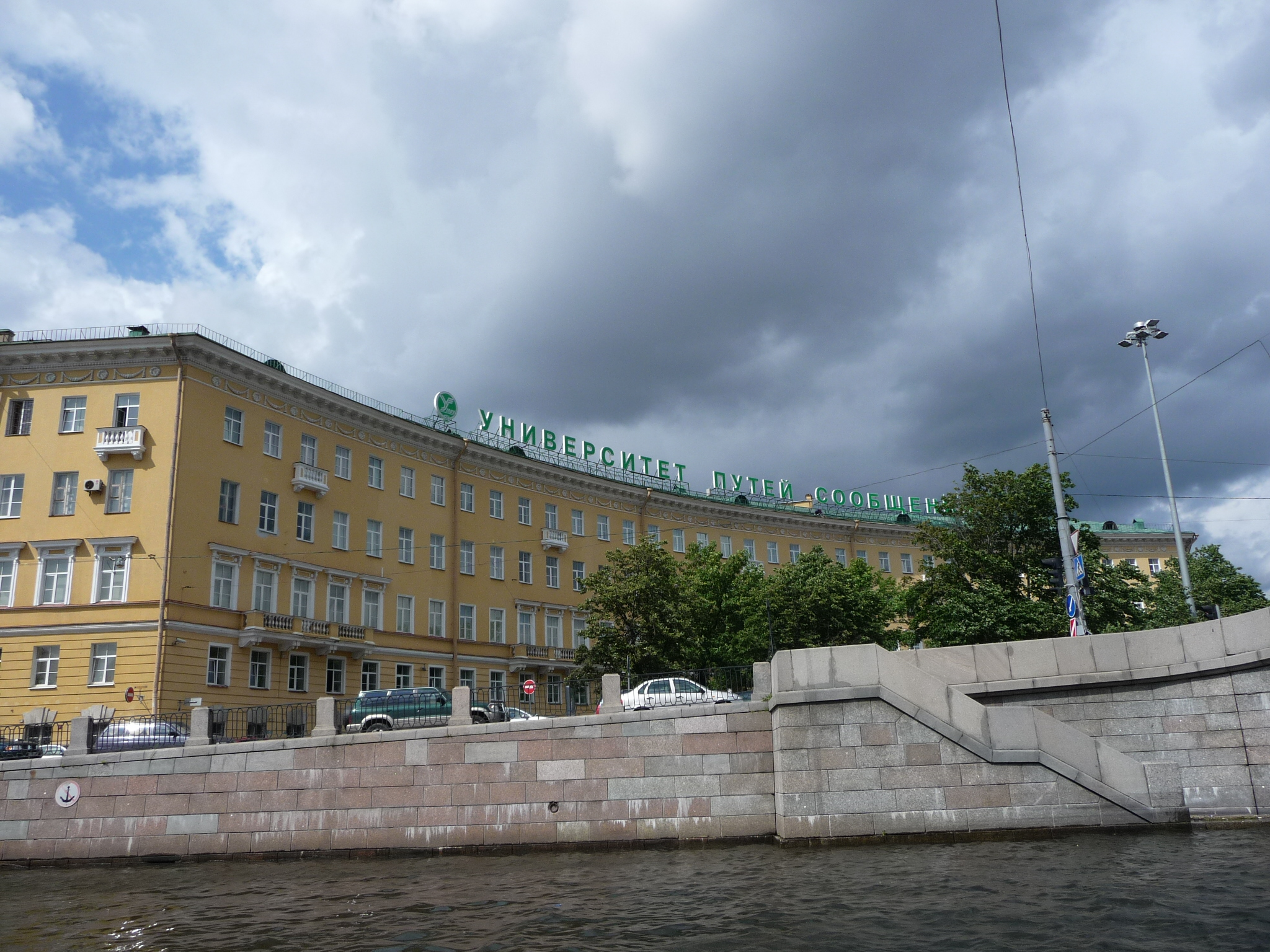
The main building, designed in 1952 by architect V. I. Kuznetsov, is at the corner of Moskovsky prospect and Fontanka embankment.

In 2018, Forbes ranked the university fourteenth on its list of the top 100 best universities in Russia.

The British consulting company QS (Quacquarelli Symonds) presented the ranking of the best universities "QS University Rankings: Eastern Europe and Central Asia". For the first time, it included the Russian railway University – University. Every year it represents Both an international global rating and a rating by region (Arab region, Asia, Latin America, BRICS, Eastern Europe and Central Asia), and a subject rating by 46 directions. For the first time in 2018, our PGUPS was included in this rating. The assessment was conducted on 10 indicators: academic reputation, reputation among employers, the ratio of scientific and pedagogical staff and students, the number of publications per employee, international scientific relations, the impact of the University on the Internet, the proportion of employees with a PhD degree, the number of citations publications per article, the proportion of foreign employees and the proportion of foreign students.

The University's ranking on the RIA "Novosti", improved from 9th to 7th in 2018. This is the best result among the universities of St. Petersburg and the transport industry.

According to the rating of Russian universities "National recognition 2019", PGUPS is in the top "Best universities 2019" in Transport, Construction (Architecture), and Environmental Protection (Human ecology).

== Sport ==
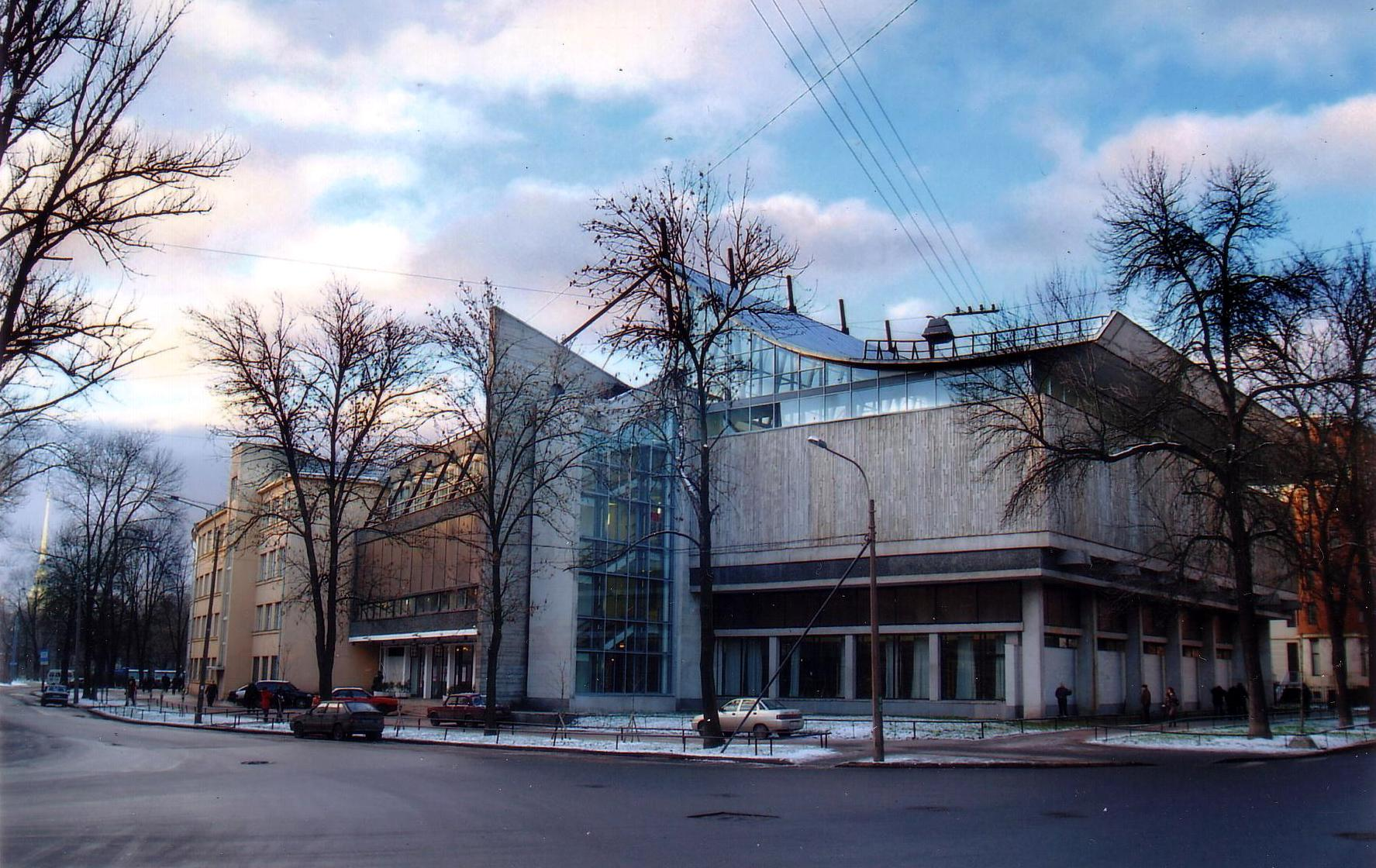
The building of the PGUPS Physical culture club

The PGUPS Physical culture club is the center of sports and mass work with students and staff of the University.

== Graduates ==
Throughout the 19th century, the Institute of railway engineers was the only transport University in the Russian Empire.

=== Alumni ===
- Nikolai Belelubsky – bridge designer, civil engineer, and scientist
- Nikolai Garin-Mikhailovsky – builder and prospector of the Trans-Siberian Railway
- Grigory Petrovich Peredery
- Vladimir Obraztsov – transport scientist and author
- Boris Beschev – USSR Minister of Railways from 1948–1977
- Alexander Drouz – veteran contestant of the Russian TV gameshow What? Where? When?. He is a certified systems engineer.
- Viktor Saltykov – Soviet and Russian singer
- Nikolai Buinov – billionaire and businessman. Forbes estimated his fortune in 2018 at $2.1 billion.
- Kirovs Lipmans – Latvian business person and ice hockey executive
- Alexander Bortnikov – Director of the Russian Federal Security Service (FSB)
- Władysław Tryliński – Polish engineer, invented trylinka
- Stoyan Bratoev – Bulgarian engineer, executive director of Metropolitan JSC - Sofia, Bulgaria.

=== Hull Union ===
The purpose of the Hull alumni:

- Creation of conditions for increasing the efficiency of professional and intellectual potential of University graduates, establishment of cultural, scientific and business relations between graduates of different years;
- Assistance in the development of the University as a center of education, science, culture, providing training of highly qualified specialists corresponding to the level of leading domestic and foreign educational institutions.
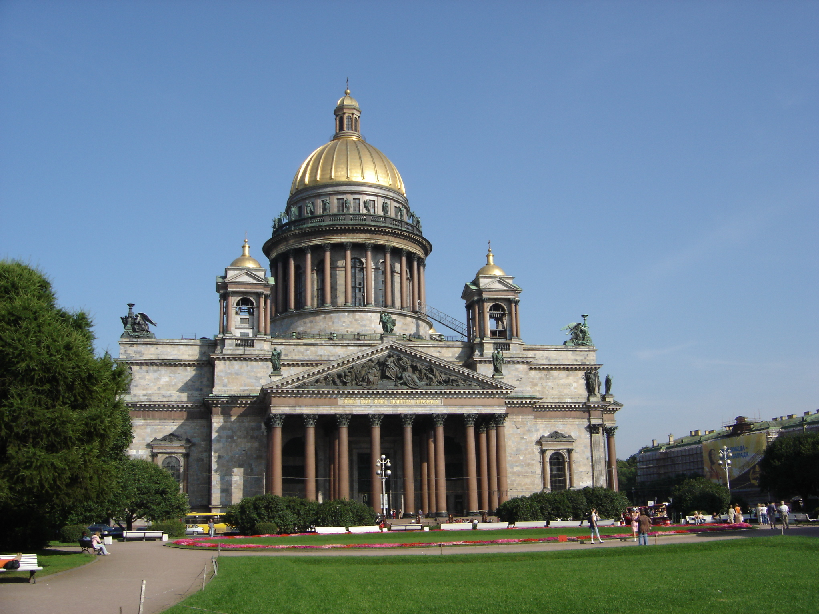
St. Isaac's Cathedral, St. Petersburg

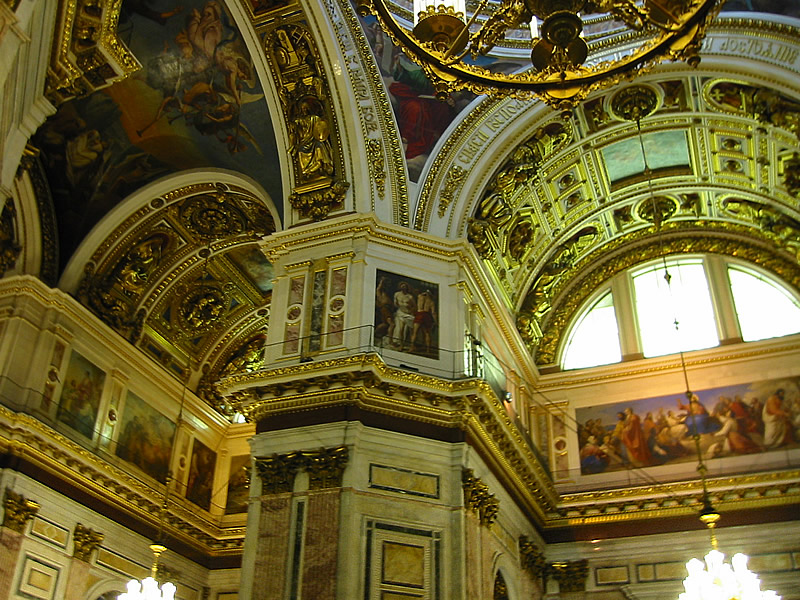
Inside St. Isaac's Cathedral

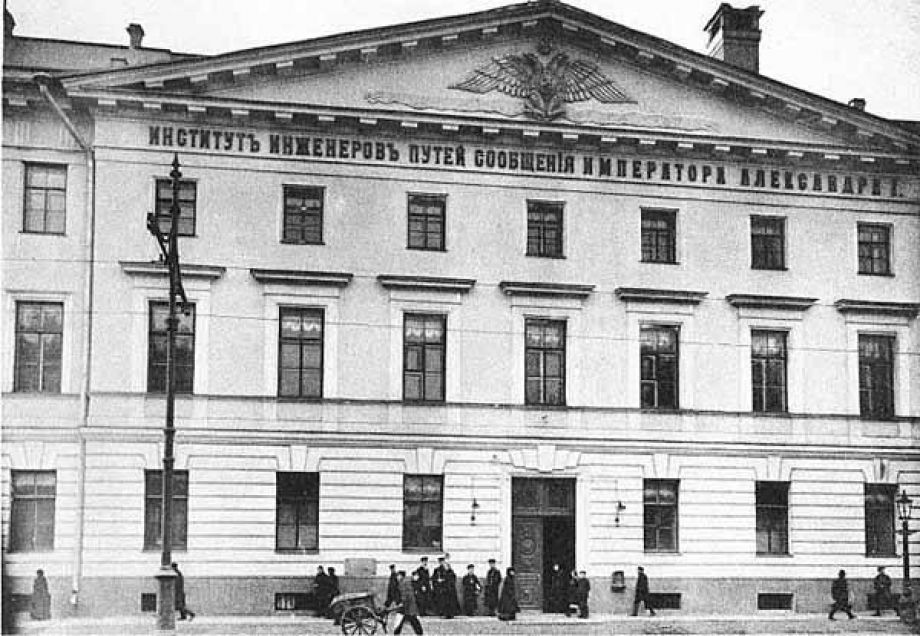
Building of the Institute of railway engineers

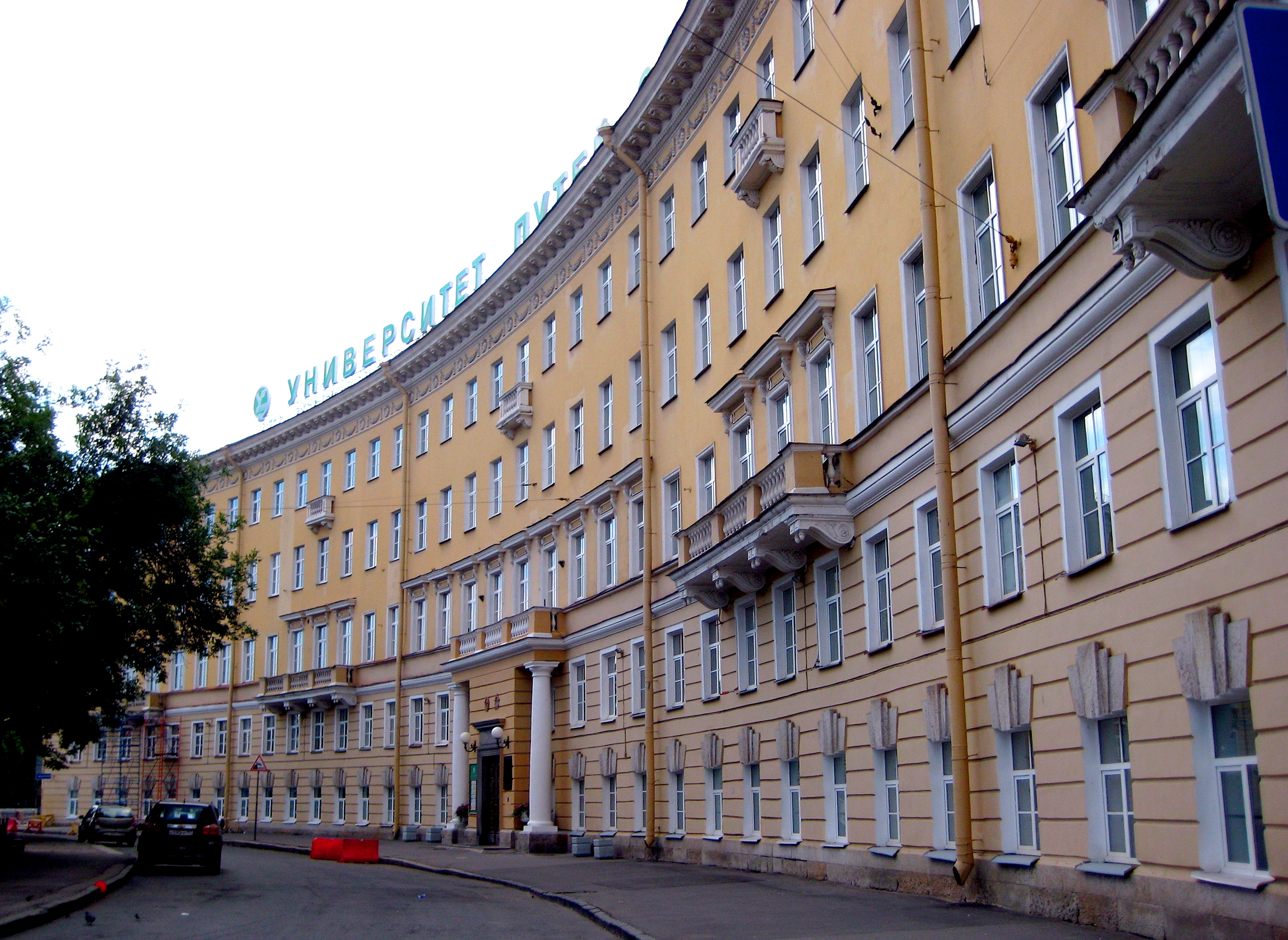
Main building at the corner of Moskovsky prospect and Fontanka river embankment

== See also ==
- Russian Railways
- Russian Union of Engineers
- Transport in Russia
- Education in Russia
