= Peredery =

Peredery is a surname. Notable people with the surname include:

- Grigory Peredery (1871–1953), Russian civil engineer
- Olga Peredery (born 1994), Ukrainian handball player
