= Vladimir Voroshilov =

Russian game show host (1930–2001)

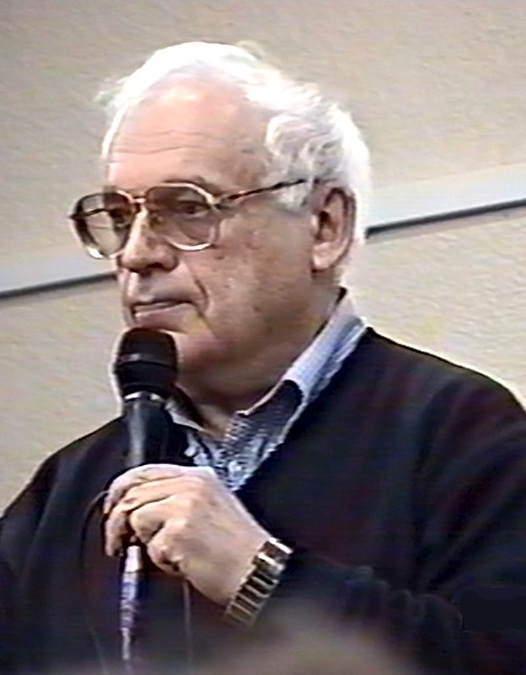
- Voroshilov in 2000
- Born: 18 December 1930; Simferopol, Soviet Union
- Died: 10 March 2001 (aged 70); Peredelkino, Moscow Oblast
- Occupation(s): Television presenter, television producer

Vladimir Yakovlevich Voroshilov (Russian: Влади́мир Я́ковлевич Вороши́лов, born name Vladimir Kolmanovich, 18 December 1930 – 10 March 2001) was an author, producer and anchorman of the television show What? Where? When?, and a member of the Russian Academy of Television. He served from 1989 as president of the International Association of Clubs.

== Biography ==
Voroshilov was born as Vladimir Kolmanovich in Simferopol, to senior ministerial official Yakov Davidovich Kolmanovich and his wife Vera Borisovna, a seamstress. In 1943 the family evacuated to Moscow.

In Moscow, Voroshilov attended an artistic school for gifted children, graduating to the faculty of painting at the State Art Institute of the Estonian SSR. He later studied also at Moscow Art Theatre (MKhAT). In 1954, he spent a year in Germany, as an artist in the theatre of the Group of Soviet Forces in Germany. In 1955—1965, with MKhAT, he was involved in operatic theatre. He became a producer at the Contemporary and at the Taganka Theatre.

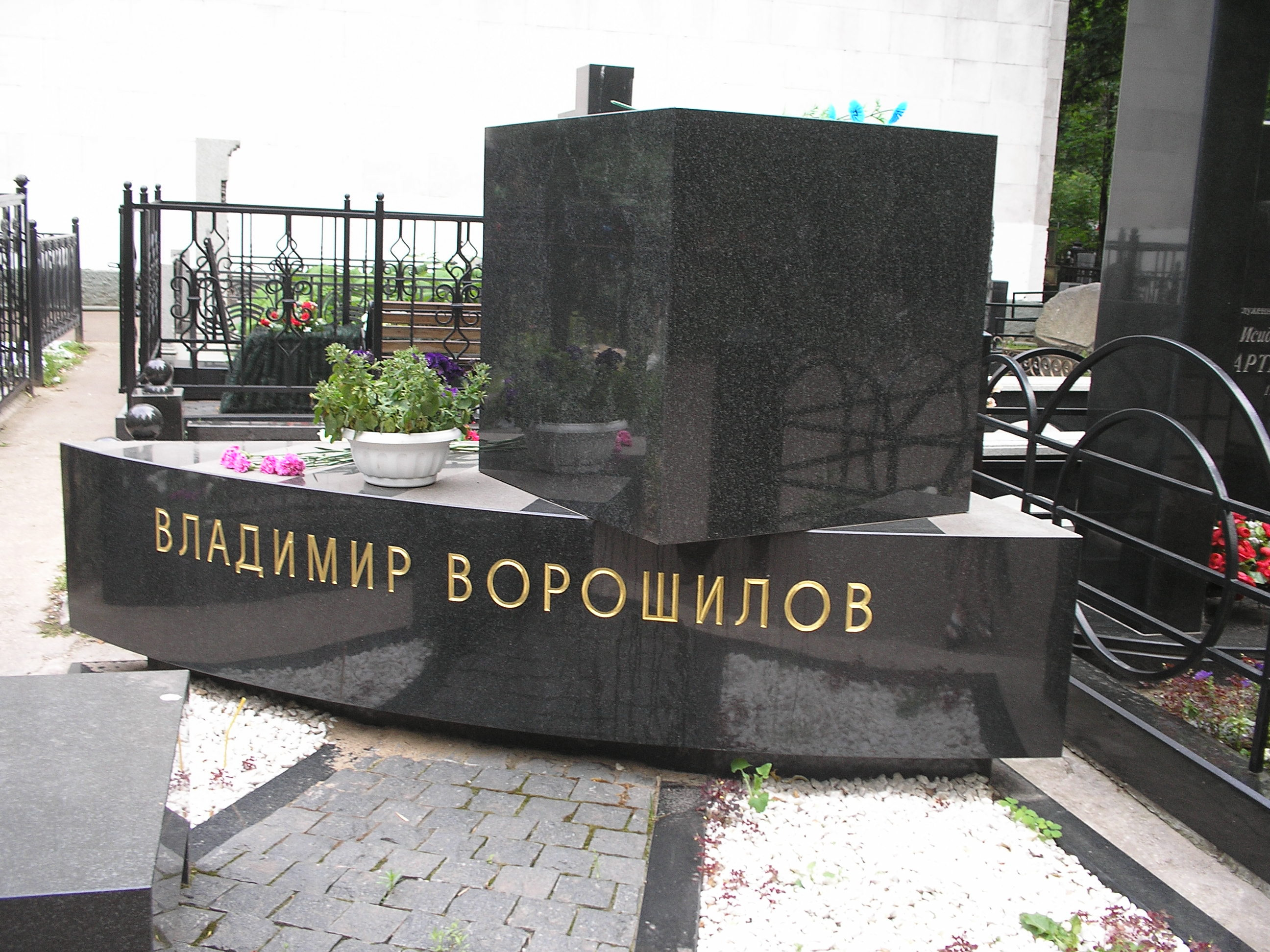
Monument on a tomb
