= Rovshan Askerov =

Azerbaijani journalist (born 1972)

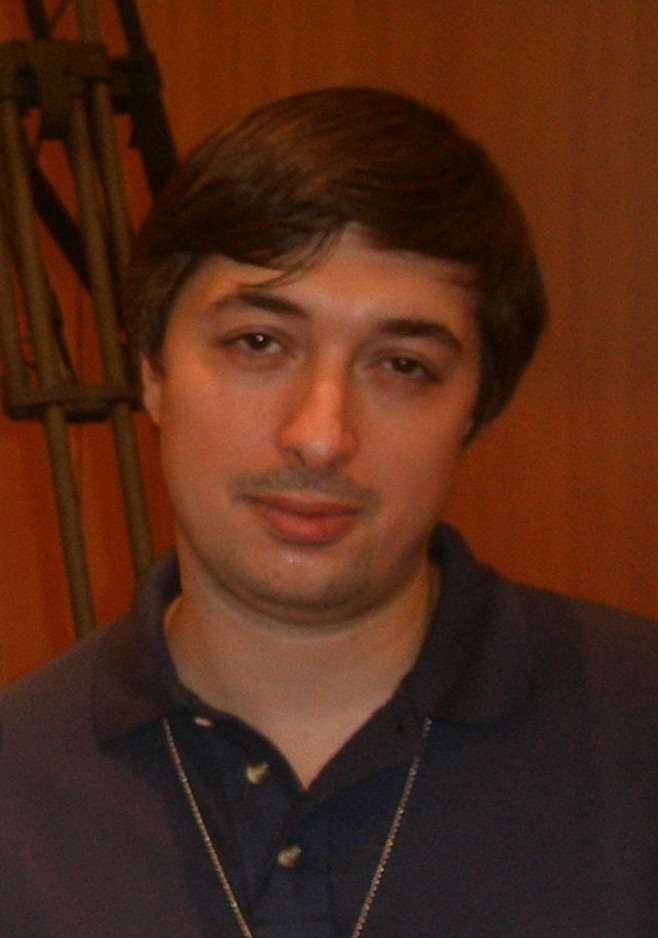
Askerov in 2007

Rovshan Enver oglu Askerov (Azerbaijani: Rövşən Ənvər oğlu Əsgərov, Russian: Ровшан Энвер оглы Аскеров; born May 4, 1972) is an Azerbaijani journalist, a participant in the television game What? Where? When? as well as a former sports columnist for the Sport-Express newspaper.

== Biography ==
Askerov was born on May 4, 1972, in Baku in the family of the artist Enver Askerov. He graduated from Baku State University’s Faculty of History in 1994 as a candidate of historical sciences. Askerov first appeared on the game show What? Where? When? on November 28, 1998, going on to become the 2001 Winter Series MVP. He is considered one of the most scandalous and odious players in the history of the TV show.

From 2001 to 2007, Askerov worked as a columnist for the Sport-Express newspaper, covering competitions in cross-country skiing, fencing, cycling, rhythmic and artistic gymnastics, and other sports. He worked as a correspondent for the 2004 Summer Olympics and the 2006 Winter Olympics.

Since 2007, Askerov has been a correspondent on the NTV-Plus television channel, where he moved at the invitation of Vasily Utkin. He has also worked for a football channel and as a commentator for competitions in ski jumping and Nordic combined.

Askerov left Russia in 2022 after an investigation was launched into statements he made on Facebook about the conduct of Georgy Zhukov in World War II. His statements were officially deemed offensive and illegal. Askerov maintains that he was telling the truth.
