= Aleksandr Druz =

Russian game show participant

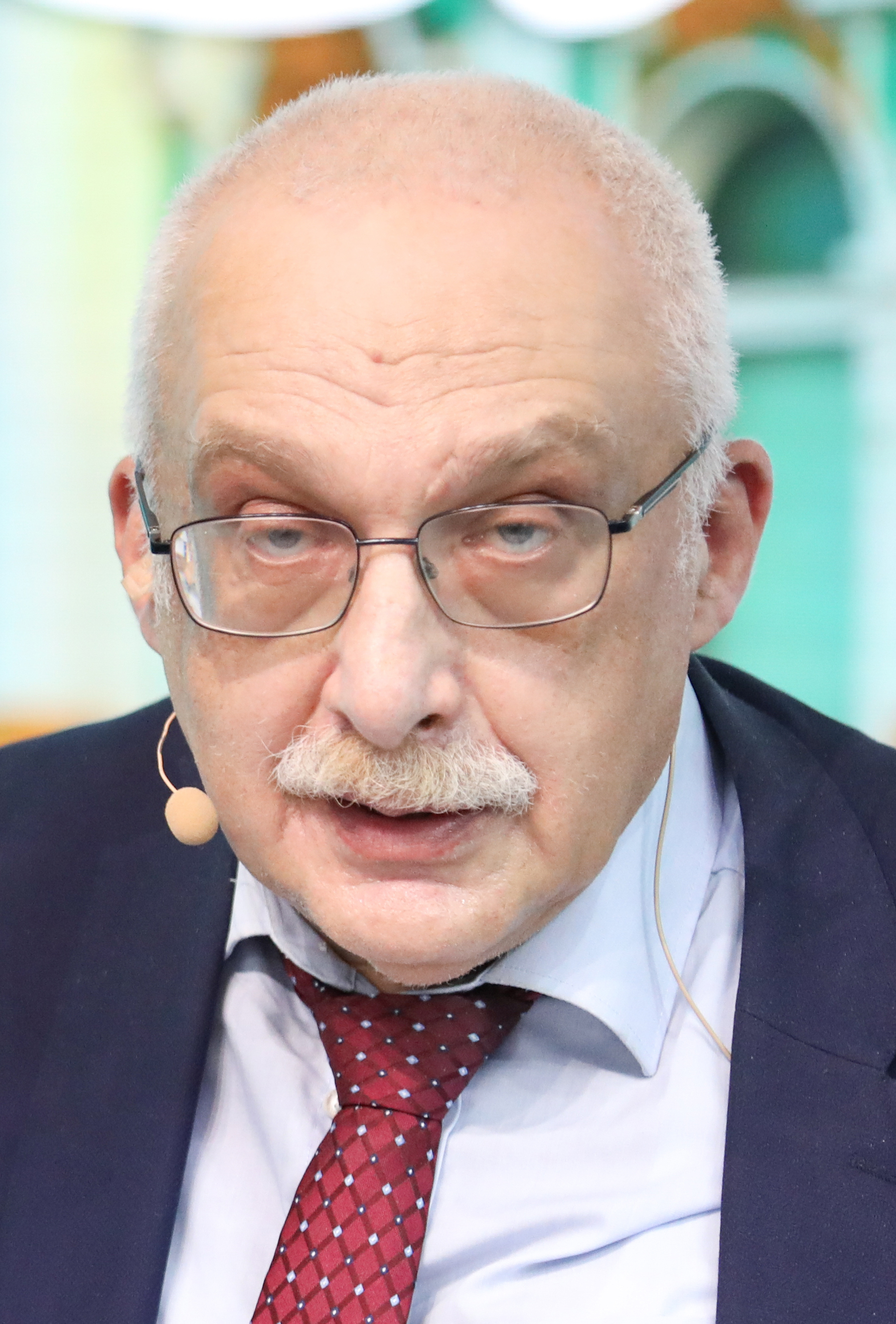

Аlexandr Abramovich Drouz (Russian: Алекса́ндр Абра́мович Друзь, 10 May 1955, Leningrad, USSR) is a veteran contestant of the Russian TV gameshow What? Where? When?, first of the currently five "Magisters of the Game"; Vice-president of the International Association of Clubs What? Where? When?, director of the Saint-Petersburg branch of the What? Where? When?

"What is the difference between smart people and stupid people? Smart people perceive the world based on the previous experience of other people, while fools must see for themselves."

— Alexander Druz, Neva studio

== Biography ==
Aleksander was educated at a Leningrad school specialising in mathematics and physics, now known as the Saint Petersburg Lyceum 239. In 1975, he left the Leningrad College of Industrial Education, and in 1980 graduated from Leningrad Institute of Engineers of Railway Transportation, now named St. Petersburg State Transport University (see also ...#Graduates), specialising in the field of "electronic computing machines" (EVM).

Drouz is a certified systems engineer.

== What? Where? When? ==
He first appeared as a contestant on What? Where? When? in 1981 and his active participation in the gameshow has been uninterrupted since then. He holds a record for the longest uninterrupted participation in the TV version of What? Where? When?. He also holds a current record on the number of the conducted TV games (100) and victories (59).

He was awarded a "Crystal Owl" as the best player of the intellectual club (1990, 1992, 1995, 2000, 2006, 2012). In 1995, he was named the first "Magister of the Game".

As of 2014, Drouz is the three times WWW World Cup Champion.

He was captain of the What? Where? When? team «Transsfera» (sporting version of the game), which he led to victory at the 1st World cup (2002). The team also won the "Mayor of Saint Petersburg" Cup in sporting What? Where? When? nine times in a row.

== Brain Ring ==
Drouz was champion of the TV show Brain Ring (a gameshow closely related in principle as well as personnel to What? Where? When?) in 1990, 1991, 1994, 2010.

== Svoya igra (Russian version of Jeopardy!) ==
He twice became a champion in the Russian TV gameshow Svoya igra (1995, 2003).

In the history of the TV game, he scored the maximum number of points in one game – 120,001. During the game, the score on the scoreboard exceeded 100,000 even before the end of the 3rd round, and the host of the program Petr Kuleshov had to glue a piece of paper with on it with a marker number "+100000", and the score on the scoreboard began to be kept from scratch, since the creators of the program did not expect that someone would be able to collect a six-figure sum. He broke his own record set by him earlier – 80 074. The record has been held from 2003 to the present.

== Television ==
Author and anchorman of gameshows and other programs on various Russian TV channels.

== Controversy ==
Drouz appeared on the Russian version of Who Wants To Be A Millionaire?, known as Kto khochet stat' millionerom? on 22 December 2018 with Viktor Sidnev. He won 200,000 rubles but the winnings were not granted on due to allegations of misconduct.

== Other projects ==
On 5 April 2008, Aleksandr Drouz became one of the Russian torchbearers of the 2008 Summer Olympics torch relay.

In 2015, he participated in the McHappy Day charity event designed to raise money for the treatment of sick children.

In 2016, he worked as a taxi driver in the St. Petersburg company "Taxovichkoff" as part of a charity event, all the funds raised from which were transferred to the AdVita charity fund that helps cancer patients.

In 2017, he appeared in a commercial in support of a sober lifestyle.

In 2018, he took part in the project of the Warm House charity fund, which helps families in crisis situations.

== Family ==
Drouz is married and has two daughters: the elder Inna Drouz and the younger Marina Druz. Both daughters have followed in their father's footsteps and participated in the "What? Where? When?" program.
