= Volodarsky Bridge =

Bridge in St Petersburg, Russia

Volodarsky Bridge Волода́рский мост
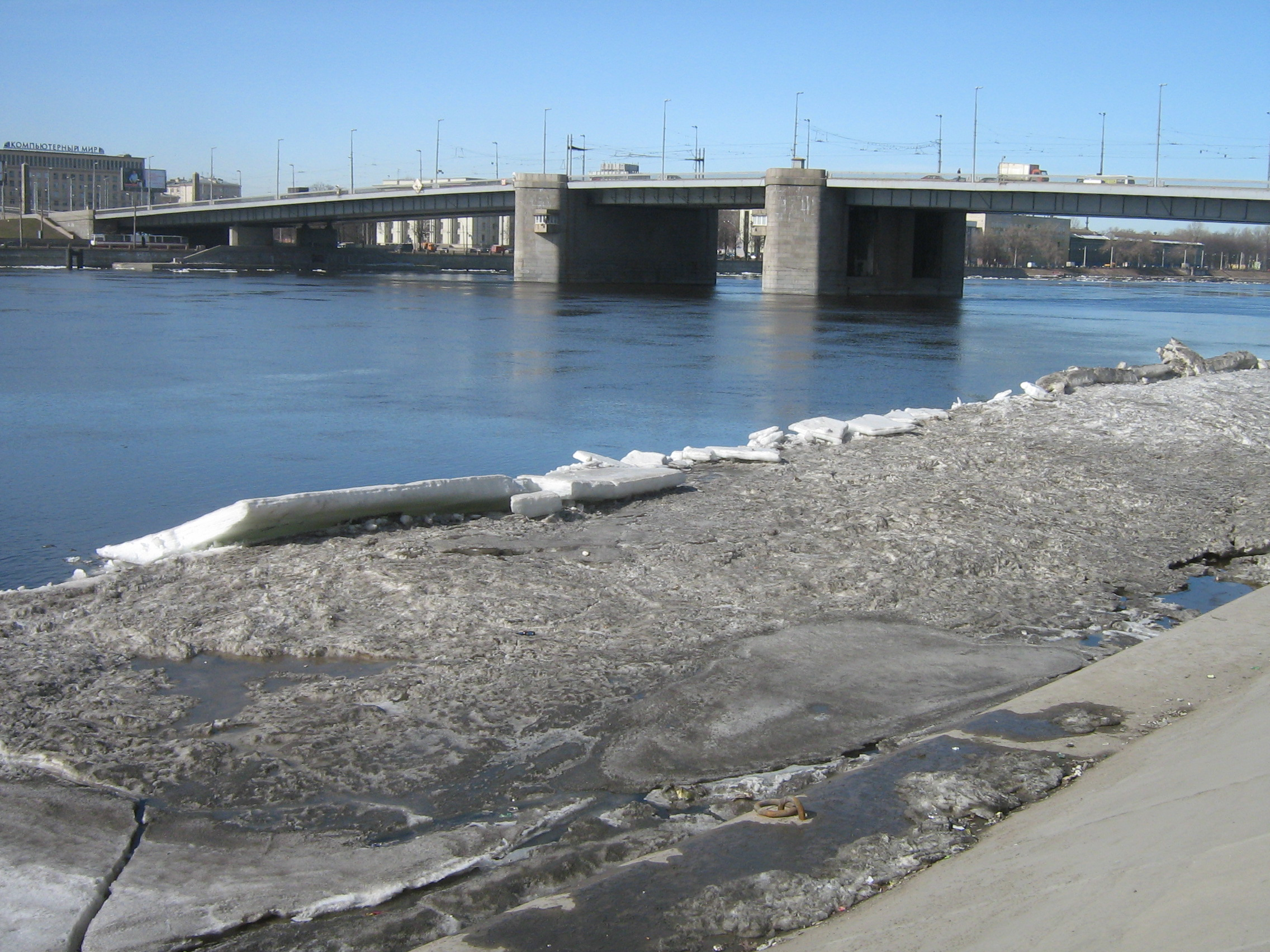
- Coordinates: 59°52′40″N 30°27′12″E
- Crosses: Neva River
- Locale: Saint Petersburg

Characteristics
- Total length: 325 meters
- Width: 36 meters

History
- Opened: 1936

Location
- Interactive map of Volodarsky Bridge; Волода́рский мост

The Volodarsky Bridge (Russian: Волода́рский мост) is a moveable bridge across the Neva River in Saint Petersburg, Russia. The bridge connects Narodnaya and Ivanovskaya streets (Nevsky District). It is named after V. Volodarsky, a revolutionary, who was killed near the future bridge in 1918. It is the only bridge in the city with an overpass for trams (left bank). The bridge is part of the Central Arc Thoroughfare. In 1932–1936, according to engineer G.P. Peredery's project, a three-span reinforced concrete arch bridge with a metal double-winged drawbridge was built. In 1986–1993, the old bridge was dismantled and replaced with a metal girder. The bridge length is 332 meters, the width is 24–27 meters. Upstream is the Bolshoy Obukhovsky Bridge, and below is the Finland Railway Bridge.

== 1936 Bridge ==
=== Design ===
The need to build a permanent bridge in this place was called by the city planning project of Leningrad in the 1930s, which provided for the significant development of its southeastern part and the planned organization of a circular transport highway, part of which was to cover the southern areas of the city and go to the Gulf of Finland.

The bridge project was developed by a group of engineers from the design department Lenmosttrest and under the leadership of professor G. P. Peredery, with the participation of engineer V. I. Kryzhanovsky on the drawbridge and architects A. S. Nikolsky and KM Dmitriev.

According to the terms of the project, it was necessary to provide a drawbridge in the center of the bridge, the side spans, in accordance with the requirements, could not be more than 100 m each. A variant of a three-span bridge with a central drawbridge 43 m long and two sideways 100 m each, covered with reinforced concrete arches was adopted for development. The use of reinforced concrete for fixed spans caused maximum metal savings.

In 1932, before the construction of the bridge began, a 1/5 life-size model of permanent arched superstructures was made, which was installed in the Tauride Garden and tested with almost double the design load. The test was held with the participation of G. P. Peredery, V. I. Kryzhanovsky, V. K. Kachurin and A. A. Dolzhenko.

=== Building ===
The bridge was built in 1932–1936. The construction of the bridge was carried out under the leadership of academician G. P. Peredery, V. I. Kryzhanovsky and chief engineer of Lenmosttrest S. A. Dzhabua. Reinforced concrete superstructures were cemented to the scaffolding on the shore. The finished arches were transported to the place of installation on pontoons using winches. Work on the transportation of the span structures was carried out under the guidance of a large shipbuilder and mathematician academician A. N. Krylova. Under his leadership, giant pontoons were designed and manufactured. The movement of the pontoons was entrusted to EPRON – "Special Purpose Underwater Expedition," which specializes in lifting sunken ships and has the appropriate powerful winches, cables, anchors, etc. The depth of the Neva at this place is about 13 meters. The operation of transportation on pontoons of span structures weighing up to 4000 tons was carried out in the practice of bridge construction for the first time. The first structure was installed on November 6, 1935, the second on August 11, 1936. On November 6, 1936, the bridge was inaugurated for traffic.

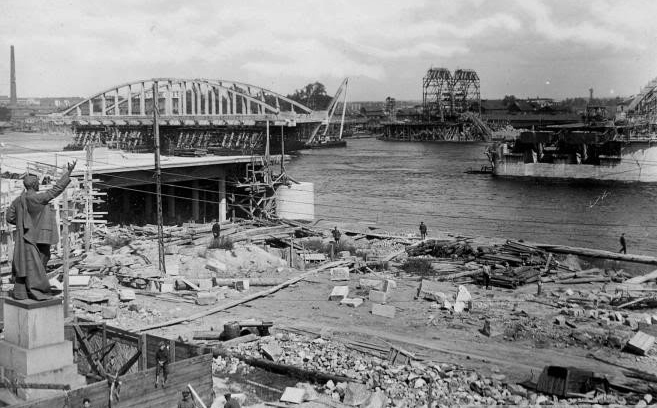
Bridge construction (1930)

== Gallery ==
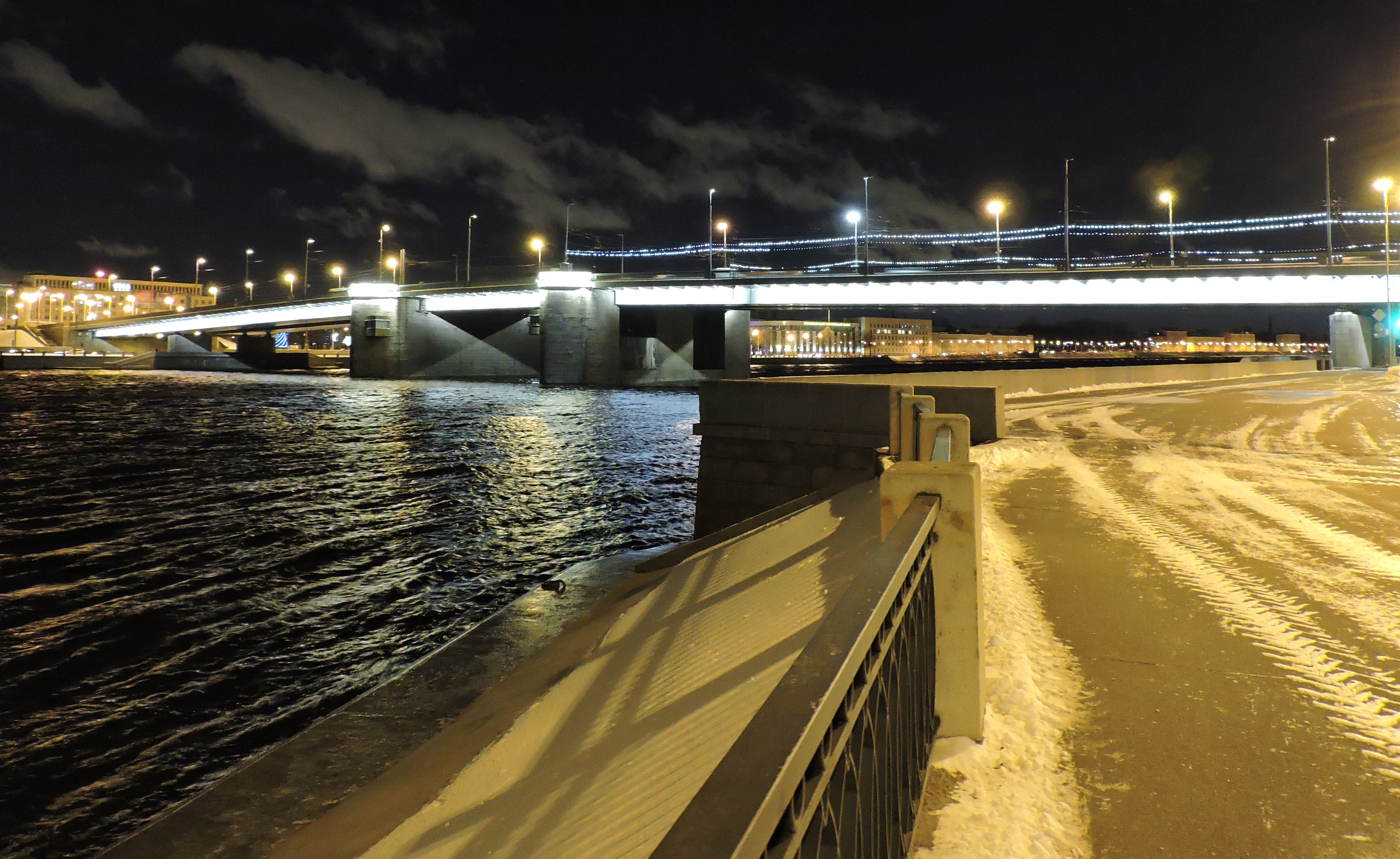
Volodarsky bridge at night

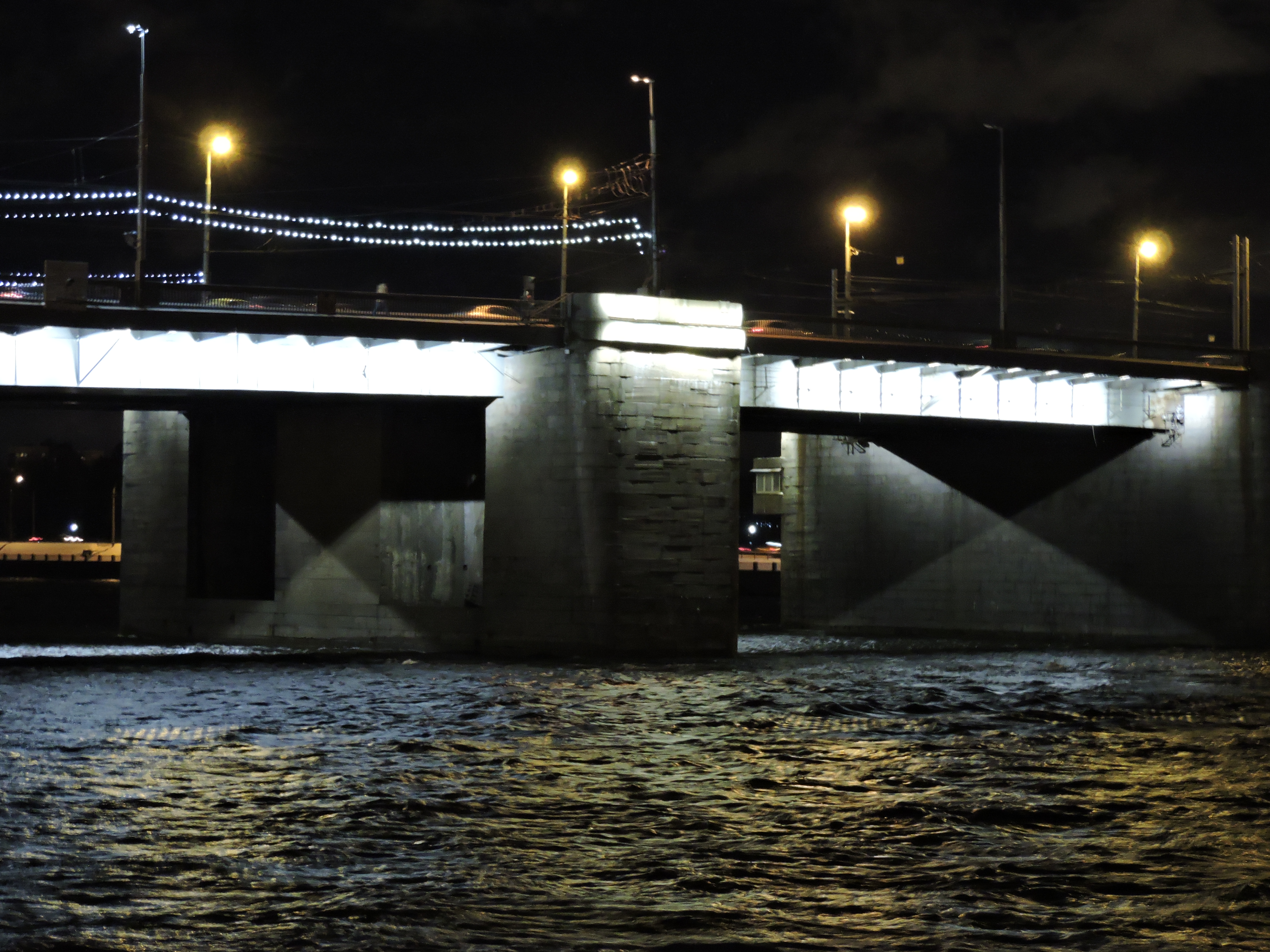
Adjustable part

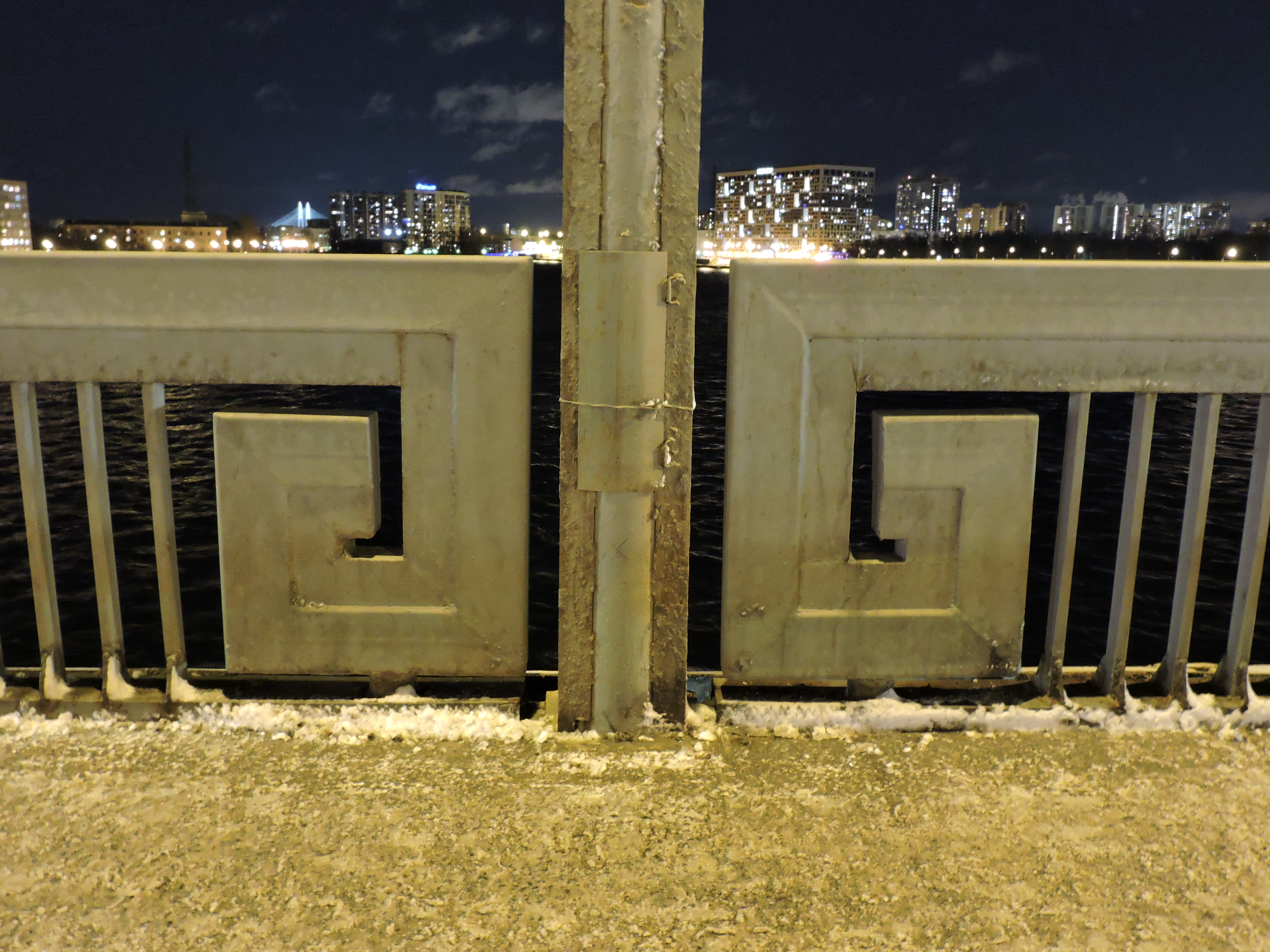
Fence of bridge

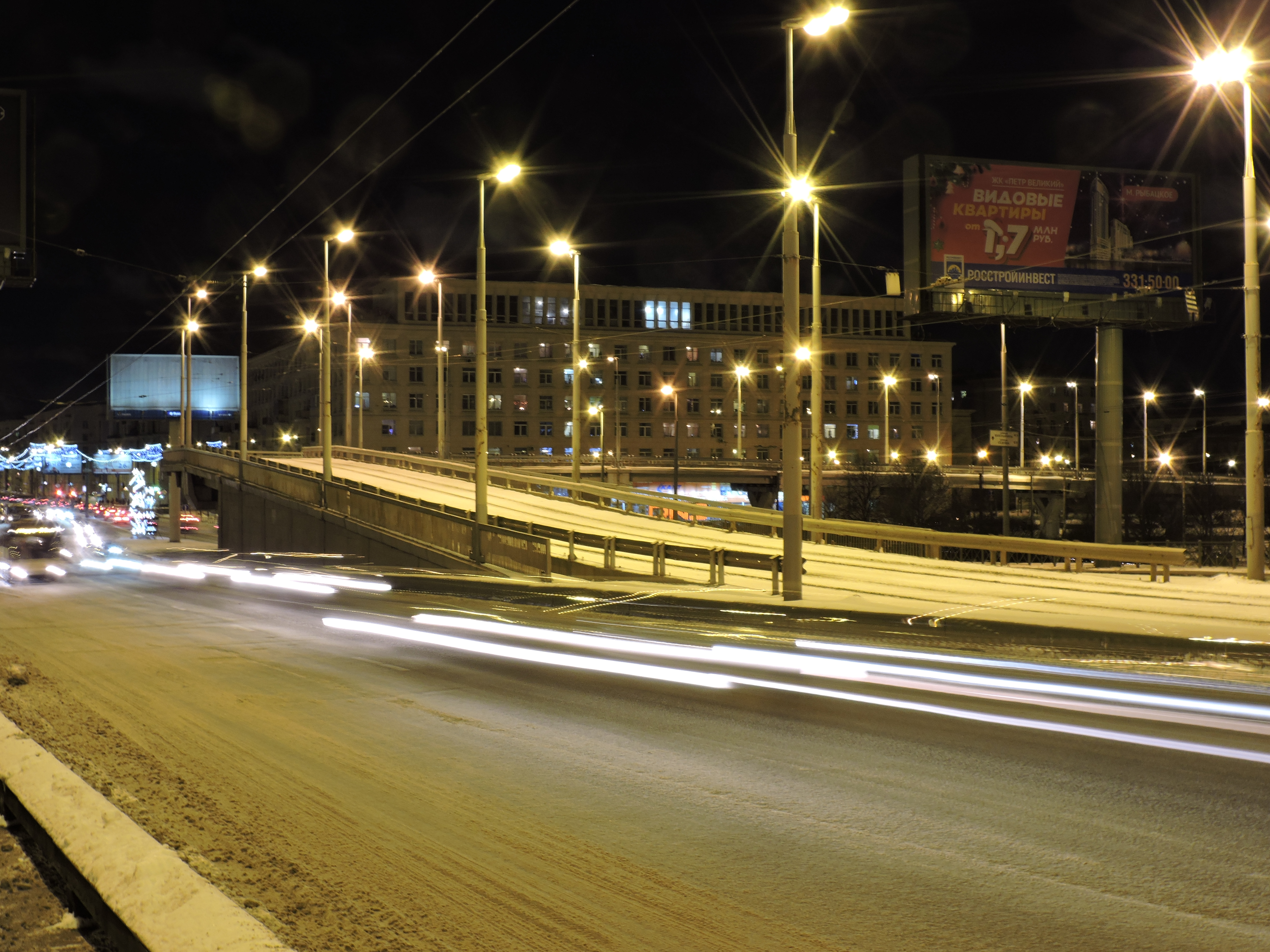
Tram overpass on the left bank

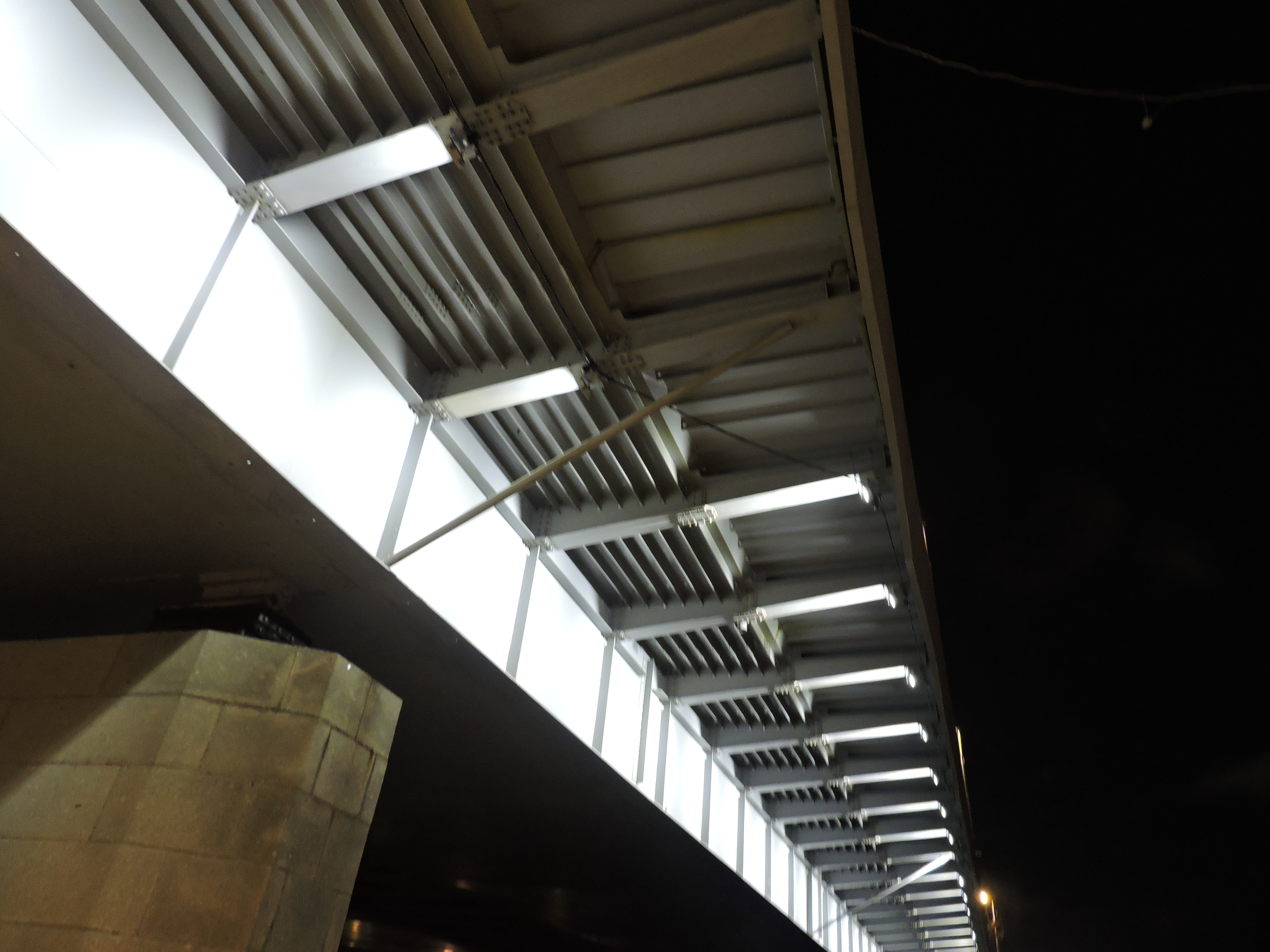
The bridge's metal structures and the layout of the projectors

== See also ==
- List of bridges in Saint Petersburg
