= Nikolai Buinov =

Businessperson (b. 1967)

Nikolai Buinov (born June 19, 1967, Krasnoyarsk, Russia) is a Russian businessman and entrepreneur. He is the co-founder of Irkutsk Oil Company (INK), the largest private oil company in Russia. Buinov has been the president of the INK since 2011. As of January 2022, he serves as the INK's chairman of the board. He is also the majority shareholder of the company, owning 64% of its shares. In 2021, Buinov was included in Forbes annual ranking «Russia's richest businessmen» as his net worth was estimated at $2.2 billion.

== Career ==
Buinov graduated from the St. Petersburg State Transport University in 1990. His career after college began at a timber company in 1993. Buinov founded Bodaibo Energy with his father in 1995. The company supplied Siberian gold miners with fuel and materials for their mining operations in Irkutsk. Buinov first heard about eastern Siberia's potential for oil production from Boris Sinyavsky, a Russian geologist. Two years later, Buinov purchased an oil field license which would go on to become Irkutsk Oil Company. Buinov founded Irkutsk Oil Company with his father and Sinyavsky in 2000. In 2017, Buinov announced that INK would increase crude oil production to 8.5 million tons per year.

Since 2017, Buinov has been also heavily investing in the hotel business. He financed the reconstruction of the Wawelberg Bank building, which was completed in 2021. From that time, the Wawelberg building operates as a hotel.

== Wealth ==
In 2024 he took 991st place in the ranking of the world's billionaires according to Forbes.

Year	2017	2018	2019	2020	2021	2022	2023	2024
Wealth ($ billion)	2,2	2,1	2	1,4	2,2	1,5	1,9	3,3

== Personal life ==
Buinov is married and has two children. He lives in Irkutsk, Russia.
