= Grigory Peredery =

Russian civil engineer (1871–1953)

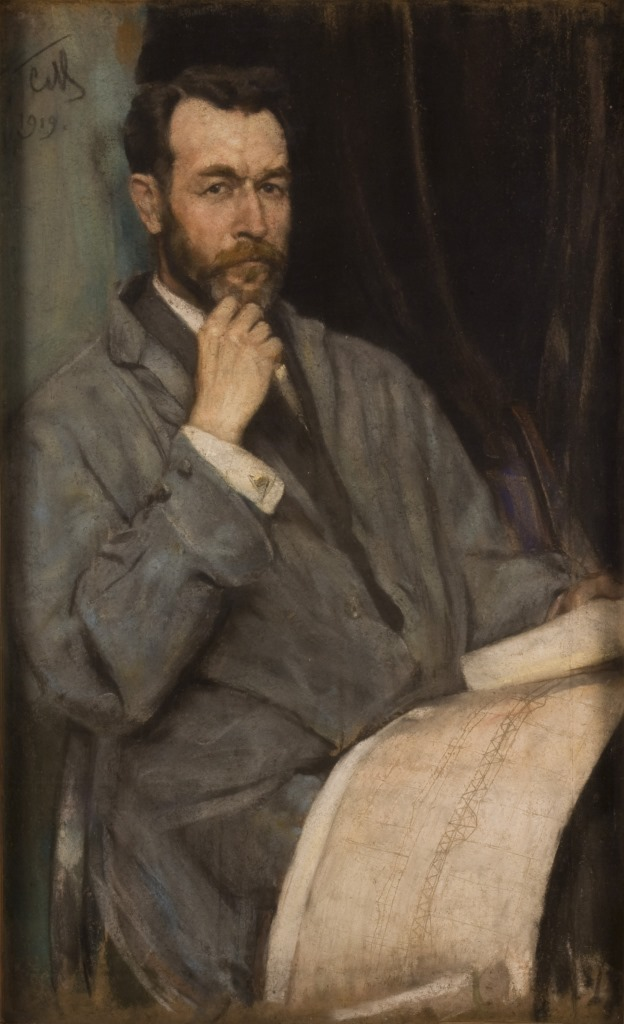

Grigory Petrovich Peredery (Russian: Григорий Петрович Передерий; 11 October 1871 – 14 December 1953) was a Russian civil engineer whose career spanned both the Imperial and the Soviet eras. He became known, in particular, as the pioneering designer of a series of major railway bridges. Peredery enjoyed a distinguished parallel career as a university teacher, becoming rector at the Petrograd State Transport University (as it was then known) in 1921. He was the author of over 80 published pieces of academic work, including a detailed course on bridge design and construction.

== Biography ==
Grigory Petrovich Peredery was born at Yeysk, an important port town and a noted spa resort beside the Sea of Azov. His father was a builder. He attended school in Yeysk and then, more briefly, in the city of Kharkiv. That was followed, during 1888/89, by a year at Agricultural College at Nowo Aleksandria in Poland, and a four month visit to Paris. During 1890/91 he served in a field battery battalion with the 13th Artillery brigade at Sevastopol. He then enrolled in 1892 at the Emperor Alexander I St. Petersburg State Transport University, a university-level institution with a focus on railway transport. He graduated in 1897. The Russian railways were enjoying a period of rapid expansion, and later that year Peredery went to work of the construction of the Dankov-Smolensk line which would open in 1899. He then went on to work on various new railways in the Caucasus region.

While still a young engineer he took charge at "Инженерное дело" (loosely, "Engineering") Magazine which was published in Tbilisi, and it was here that his first written contributions were published. Peredery successfully combined research and teaching with practical engineering work focused on bridge design and construction. He was a pioneer in the use of steel-reinforced concrete, developing as early as 1915 the concept of standardized designs for reinforced concrete beam structures. Later he advanced the idea of building from precast concrete bridge structures. In 1912 he published "Курс железобетонных мостов. Конструкция, проектирование и расчет" which dealt with the design of reinforced concrete bridges, and the necessary parameters and calculations to be applied. This amounted to a detailed written instruction course. It was reprinted several times and became extremely influential.

In 1902, while he was working as an engineer on the construction of the Moscow–Kazan Railway, Peredery took a teaching job with the railways department at the Moscow Engineering Academy ("Московского инженерного училища"). Between 1907 and 1914 he also lectured at the Engineering Institute of Transport Communications (Петербургского "Института инженеров путей сообщения ") in Saint Petersburg. In 1919 became a professor. In 1920 he was appointed Dean of the Faculty of Engineering Structures and in 1921 he became rector at the Petrograd State Transport University. Between 1923 and 1927 he also held the post of rector at the Institute of Civil Engineers. The period since 1914 had been one of enduring crisis, which for the transportation sector meant addressing the urgent need for reconstruction following the widespread destruction and degradation caused by the Civil War and surrounding events.

The State Transport University was one of the country's main engineering universities, training engineers in respect of all forms of transport. However, during the period 1918 - 1920 it was only producing approximately 60-70 trained engineers each year. There was a desperately urgent need to implement educational reforms that would permit the mass training of dedicated transport engineers to restore the railways and develop a modern rail infrastructure worthy of the young republic. Students had traditionally been recruited from the nobility, officer families and the middle classes. Social and political upheavals during 1917/18 and the subsequent Civil War had led to great changes. Some of the teachers had died while others had escaped to the west. Social classes that had traditionally provided the students were much diminished. The government installed a commissar who was able to resolve some of the political issues that arose and ensure that the university progressed in a manner acceptable to the government, but that did not, on its own, address all the challenges. Restructuring therefore involved what one source identifies as rapid proletarianisation of the university. The first step was the creation of "workers' faculties" designed to prepare the country's proletarians for university admission. The courses involved lasted 2-3 years. Meanwhile in May 1921 the university opened a "day-time work school" where approximately 250 were trained. In November 1922 an evening branch was opened. By the start of the 1922/23 academic year the day-time department was able to welcome 380 new students.

In 1922 the constitutional structure of the university was re-engineered. The Council of Elders was eliminated and replaced by new student organisations. One of the main challenges driving the restructuring involved making a start on changing the social composition of the student body. All this involved a drastic restructuring of study patterns. A number of new curricula had to be created, while other curricula that were retained needed extensive revision. Graduation and work-experience arrangements were comprehensively re-engineered. Preparing large numbers of fully-fledged engineers capable of solving the technical and practical challenges involved in restoring and reconstructing the transport network meant identifying and applying the most politically acceptable methods for training young proletarian comrades whose shared defining characteristic was an insufficiency of basic general education. Prof. Peredery led the re-engineering work.

Grigory Peredery died in Moscow aged 82 on 14 December 1953, by which time his work had earned him a number of significant state awards and honours. His mortal remains were buried in the Vvedenskoye Cemetery on the eastern edge of the city.

== Works ==
Peredery masterminded over 30 major concrete and metal bridges over the Volkhov, Moskva, Dnieper, Vologda and Ob rivers. One of the earliest was the 1910 Borodinsky Bridge (subsequently widened and extended) in the heart of Moscow. Another, in 1916, was the reinforced concrete bridge (subsequently reworked and extended) over the great Amur River at Khabarovsk. Later constructions were the October Bridge (1928-1931) in Vologda, the Volodarsky Bridge (1932-1936) and Annunciation Bridge (1936-1938) in Saint Petersburg, and the Kuznechevsky Bridge (opened 1956) in Arkhangelsk, far to the north.

== Awards and honours (selection) ==
- 1939 Order of Lenin
- 1943 Distringuished Science and Technology Worker of the Soviet Union ("Заслуженный деятель науки и техники РСФСР")
- 1943 Stalin Prize in science, engineering and the arts Second level) for many years of outstanding work in engineering and technology
- 1943 Order of the Red Star
- 1945 Order of the Red Star (again)
- 1945 Order of the Red Banner of Labour
- 1946 Order of the Red Banner of Labour (again)
- 1949 Medal "In Commemoration of the 800th Anniversary of Moscow"

Grigory Peredery became a corresponding member of the Russian Academy of Sciences in 1939 (Mechanics Department) and a full academician in 1943 (Bridge Engineering Department).
