= What? Where? When? =

Intellectual game show in the USSR and Russia

- Game show logo
- Genre: Game show
- Created by: Vladimir Voroshilov; Natalia Stetsenko
- Directed by: Vladimir Voroshilov (1975–2000); Boris Kryuk (2001–present)
- Presented by: Alexander Maslyakov (1975–1976); Vladimir Voroshilov (1977–2000); Boris Kryuk (2001–present)
- Opening theme: Owl with Crown
- Countries of origin: Soviet Union (1975–1991); Russia (1992–present)
- Original language: Russian
- No. of seasons: 43
- No. of episodes: 493

Production
- Executive producer: Alyona Loban
- Producers: Boris Kryuk; Andrey Anatolyevich Kozlov (1991–present); Yegor Yuzbashev (1999–2000)
- Running time: up to 90 min. (live)

Original release
- Network: Soviet Central Television (1975–1991); Ostankino Television 1 (1992–1994); Channel One (1995–1998, 2000–present); NTV (1999–2000)
- Release: September 4, 1975 – present

What? Where? When? (Russian: Что? Где? Когда?, translit. Chto? Gde? Kogda?; ChGK) is an intellectual game show well-known in Russian-language media and other CIS states since the mid-1970s. Today it is produced for television by TV Igra on the Russian Channel One and also exists as a competitive game played in clubs organized by the World Association of Intellectual Games. Over 50,000 teams worldwide play the sport version of the game, based on the TV show.

== Format ==
Throughout the game, a team of six experts attempts to answer questions sent in by viewers. For each question, the time limit is one minute. The questions require a combination of skills such as logical thinking, intuition, insight, etc. to find the correct answer. The person who sent in the question earns a prize if the experts cannot give the correct answer, while the team of experts earns points if they manage to get the correct answer.

The basic rules of the game are:

- The game is played between a "team of TV viewers" and a team of six experts. Viewers ask questions to the experts, and the experts, during a one-minute discussion, try to find the answer to the given question.
- If the experts answer the question correctly, they earn a point. If their answer is wrong, the viewers' team gets a point, and the viewer who sent in this question receives a monetary prize. The experts do not receive monetary prizes.
- The experts sit around the round table divided into 13 sectors, 12 of which contain envelopes with questions mailed in by viewers and pre-checked for validity, while the 13th sector (see below) indicates a question randomly selected from questions submitted by Internet during the show. Questions from the 13th sector are not pre-checked thus their quality and validity are not guaranteed.
- The arrow on the spinning top selects the sector which will be played next. If the arrow points to a sector which has already been played, the next clockwise sector is selected.
- A question may involve material objects or media (video or audio) demonstrated to the players.
- Sometimes the subject of the question is placed inside a "black box" brought into the room and placed on the table but not opened until the correct answer is announced. In this case, the question usually ends with, "What is in the black box?"
- The experts may choose to answer the question immediately, before the minute starts. Then, if their answer is correct, they win an extra minute that can be used to discuss one question later in the game. They may also answer during the minute, but with no chance to win an extra minute.
- Usually, members of other teams of experts attend the game and informally discuss questions among themselves during the show. Once per game, but only if the viewers' team is in the lead, the playing team can ask for help from other experts present in the hall, who have 20 seconds to help. Surprisingly enough, despite the fact that teams actually compete with each other and have no material reasons to assist, the traditions of collaborative work in the club and the spirit of friendship—even between members of different teams—usually urge them to suggest the best answers they have to the playing team.
- The game continues up to 6 points scored by either side.
- When the experts get 5 points, they may declare "the final round" which means that only one expert remains to play the round. This clears the score, and this question "costs" 6 points. The expert must give the exact answer (any variations are not accepted) to win the game with the score 6:0.
- In the 2012 series, the rule of a "minute for loan" was added: if the viewers' team has 5 points, the experts' team may choose to have one extra minute for a particular question (the viewer who sent the question in is awarded their prize even if the experts' answer is correct) and answer one of the later questions without discussing it.
- The room stewards, along with the host, are monitoring the conduct throughout entire game. Hinting the right answer to the experts' team is strictly forbidden. The stewards may show a red card to all of the room to signal that the hinting attempt has been noticed (the host may also suspend a game to announce the hinting attempt). Then, steward shows the card at the person who tried to hint the experts, and that person is removed from the room until the end of the game. The experts' team may be denied the answer, and therefore, lose a point which will go to the viewers' team.

=== Special sectors ===
- Blitz: three easier questions with 20 seconds to discuss each one. The experts must answer all three questions correctly to win the point.
- Superblitz: same as blitz, but only one expert remains at the table. In recent years, the last expert to win a superblitz within a calendar year is awarded a prize.
- 13th sector: the computer randomly selects one of the questions received on the Internet during the game. If this is the final of the year, Boris Kruk asks instead. If he wins his part of the prize divides to all non-winners (8 or more).
- 0 (zero) (before 2001): questions by the game-makers. Host Vladimir Voroshilov entered the room, chose one of three questions placed in the sector, and asked it himself. This was the only time where the host could be seen in the show. In some series the zero sector had the special rule: it was played only if the arrow pointed at it directly, the clockwise rule did not apply. The sector could be played up to 3 times this way. After Voroshilov's death, the sector was replaced with the 13th sector.

=== Prizes (Russian version) ===
- The TV viewer gets 50000₽ + 10000₽ for every extra point the Team of TV Viewers has (Ie, they earn an extra 50000₽ if score 0:0-5:0) but they receive 100000₽ for the 6th point, if experts answer incorrectly, or request call the club or minute in loan. Starting from 2022 season prizes for every TV Wiever's winning questions awarded 100000₽
- The best question (submitted by a member of the Team of TV Viewers) gets an 150000₽ (sometimes an ordinary question may receive this)
- In the final show of the year, the team of TV viewers play for a super-prize: the deposit (with compounding prizes and elements of a jackpot). This sum is divided by each player that have won (by either 1,2,3,4,5 or 6). If Kruk wins the 13th sector, this part is divided by the 12 question submitters.
- The best player of the year gets The Diamond Owl.

=== Music pause ===
Music pauses are used as timeouts. Music plays in a cabaret style.

- In the USSR ("play for books" season), it was a considered a sector. If the music sector arrives, the experts automatically win a point, and all viewers win the music.
- Later, the experts or Voroshilov could call once or twice per game (in a rematch game, one standard pause plus two pauses where the team must sing, also with extra buy-in minutes). Is also a kind of mulligan (experts could not play superblitz/zero or rebet; Voroshilov if they thought the selected question was too easy or too hard. In December 2000, Alexander Byalko called a timeout (as T-sign, not placing treble clef as usual) to form a new group (in hockey style).
- From 2001 onward, music pauses are technical timeouts for advertisements (after music) and commercial pause in volleyball style. The second timeout is a tea or coffee pause (sponsored).

== Sample questions ==
=== Ordinary sector ===
Question: What, according to Christopher Morley, was invented by a woman who had been kissed on the forehead?
Answer: High heels.

Question: Continue the sequence: love, breath, Rome, estate, column, sense, heaven...
Answer: Wonder. (The question is based upon popular set expressions: the first love, the second breath, the third Rome, the fourth estate, the fifth column, the sixth sense, the seventh heaven, and the eighth wonder.)

Question: The ancient Scandinavians used so called kennings, a kind of literary trope. For example, “the land of the spirit” meant the human chest ("around the heart" area) and “the land of the whale” meant the sea. What did “the land of the falcon” mean?
Answer: The hand.

=== Black box questions ===
Any question ending in "What is in the black box"? In some questions, it was another black box, or even a flight data recorder (in Russian, the words are the same). There are three black boxes, but the large black box is usually the one used. The smaller and smallest boxes are used only if there are two or three boxes in the question, in blitz rounds, or if the item must be smaller in size.

Question: No modern book has aroused so much talk as the one in the black box. What book is it?
Answer: A telephone book.

Other contents of the big black box have included the following:

- Barcode (question about EAN standards)
- "vopros@tvigra.ru" (as an example of an email address)
- Dust (not the moth)
- Laces (31.05.2020 game, instant answer)

=== Musical questions ===
Question: (Two different pieces of music from J. S. Bach's exercises are played to the experts.) The black box contains a thing which can be placed between these two pieces. What is it?
Answer: A mirror. (Either piece is the reverse version of the other.)

=== Video questions ===
Question: (Three video clips are demonstrated to the experts: a tractor in a field, a flying aircraft and a submarine in the sea.) A Chinese proverb says he can do('work with, or fix') everything but the three things shown. What is his profession?
Answer: A chef. (The proverb says he can cook with anything walking on earth except for a tractor, everything flying in the sky except for an aircraft and everything swimming in the sea except for a submarine.)

=== Picture-based questions ===
Question: (An old map of England is given to the experts.) Using a map like this, Edmond Halley became the first to measure the area of each county in England. What simple method did he use to do so if he only knew the area of the county of Kent?
Answer: He cut out and weighed separately each of the counties. Then he could easily evaluate the area of each county based on the area/weight relationship calculated from the weight and area of Kent known to him.

=== Item-based questions ===
The experts are presented an item and usually asked how it is used.

Question: (The experts are given a party balloon inflated with air at normal pressure.) Explain how this item could be used at a space station.
Answer: Letting the balloon float could help in detecting the hidden drift/air flows, and thus aid in searching for lost items that could have possibly drifted away.

=== Blitz questions ===
Question: Seneca once said to Nero, "Anyway, you can never kill…" whom?
Answer: The one who will replace you.

=== Superblitz questions ===
Question: What is the word for "lightning" in German?
Answer: Blitz.

Question: What place, according to Mark Twain, has the highest rate of mortality?
Answer: A bed.

=== 13th sector ===
Question: What do you get twice for free and have to pay for if you want more?
Answer: Teeth. (Baby teeth, permanent teeth, and false teeth.)

Question: The uniform enrolled in 1925, before that it did not have any standard
Answer: Artek uniform

== History ==
The game was developed between 1975 and 1977 by artist, television host and director Vladimir Voroshilov. The very first version of the game (aired September 4, 1975) emphasized knowledge rather than logic; two families competed from their homes. In the next two years only two games were aired, the second of which, on 24 December 1977, already was close to today's format: a top spinning on the table selected a viewer's question which is discussed for one minute by a team of 6 persons; the host is "invisible" and present only as a voice. (At the time, Voroshilov was banned from appearing on the screen; even his name was not indicated in the show credits.) Since 1978 the game has been aired regularly. The final major change in rules, in 1982, established that the game continues until 6 points are scored by either side. Since 1986, the games have been broadcast live. Since 1990, TV broadcasting of the game takes place in the Okhotnichy domik that is located in the Neskuchny Garden. In 1991, the game became the first TV show in the USSR where TV viewers and experts could receive monetary prizes. Since 2001, only TV viewers can receive monetary prizes.

The game quickly became popular, and a dozen or so of the best players from the TV version have become household names of the same magnitude as pop-music stars: Viktor Sidnev, Nurali Latypov, Alexander Drouz, Rovshan Askerov, Fyodor Dvinyatin, Boris Burda, Anatoly Wasserman, Maxim Potashyov, among others.

== International versions ==
Licensed versions of the game are currently being aired throughout countries of the former Soviet Union (like Azerbaijan and Georgia). Notably, whilst the original show is aired live, licensed shows are usually recorded.

In December 2009, it was announced that the American production company Merv Griffin Entertainment would produce a pilot for ABC of an American version of the show, tentatively titled The Six. (Its predecessor, Merv Griffin Enterprises, produced Wheel of Fortune, a game show successfully imported into Russia under the title Pole Chudes in 1990). The new show aimed to preserve the essence of the Russian original, although producers had stated that there would be "tweaks" to the format and feature an on-camera host. In April 2010 it was reported that the show would be hosted by Vernon Kay. Production of the show took place in the summer of 2010. The game title was changed first to Six Minds and finally to Million Dollar Mind Game.

The game premiered on Sunday, October 23, 2011 at 4:00 p.m. ET on ABC. In the American version, a team of six friends competed together to answer a series of questions. Each correct answer increased their cash prize, starting at $6,000 and increasing to $1 million for the tenth answer. However, if the team missed a total of four questions, the game ended and they lost everything. They had 60 seconds to discuss each question, after which the team captain for that question gave a response. Three forms of assistance were available, each of which could be used once after the captain responded: an extra 30 seconds of discussion time, replacing the question with a different one at the same money level, or rejecting the captain's answer and giving a different one. After any correct answer, the team members secretly voted on whether to continue or stop the game; if all six voted to stop, the game ended and they split their winnings equally. Otherwise, the game continued and the captain's position rotated by one seat.

The originally produced episodes were burned off by ABC over a period of six weeks on Sunday afternoons as counterprogramming for NFL games on CBS and Fox (depending on market and television restrictions, the show often went up against meaningless games in some markets where a poorly performing team may be mandated to be covered in that market) after the October 2011 Las Vegas tragedy, and there was no indication that any new episodes would be produced in the future, despite critical acclaim by critics and game show fans alike.

In May 2012, a network spokesperson confirmed that Million Dollar Mind Game was canceled.

Legend: Currently airing No longer airing

Country	Title	Host	Channel	Date premiered	Language
Armenia	Ի՞նչ, որտե՞ղ, ե՞րբ	Karen Kocharyan	Armenia TV	February 2002	Russian, Armenian
Azerbaijan	Nə? Harada? Nə zaman?	Balash Kasumov	Space TV (2006–2010); AzTV (2010-2018); İTV (2018–present)	2006	Russian, Azerbaijani
Belarus	Что? Где? Когда?	Ales' Mukhin	ONT	March 2009	Russian
Bulgaria	Какво? Къде? Кога?	Vladimir Voroshilov	Intervision, Channel One (Central Television of USSR)	November 13–15, 1987	Russian, Bulgarian (simultaneous translation)
Estonia	Mis? Kus? Millal?	Unknown	Kanal 2	March 17, 2013	Estonian
Georgia	რა? სად? როდის?	George Mosidze	First Channel	January 2008	Georgian
Italy	Million Dollar Mind Game	Teo Mammucari	Canale 5	2011 (pilot episode)	Italian
Kazakhstan	Что? Где? Когда?	Balash Kasumov	Channel 7 (Sed'moy Kanal)	September 30, 2011	Russian
Kyrgyzstan	Билерман ордо	Talantbek Kanatbek uulu (Талантбек Канатбек уулу)	ElTR (ЭлТР)	2007	Russian, Kyrgyz
Lithuania	Kas? Kur? Kada?	Robertas Petrauskas	TV3	April 15, 2012	Lithuanian
Russia	Что? Где? Когда?	Vladimir Voroshilov, Boris Kryuk	Channel One; NTV (1999–2000)	September 4, 1975	Russian
Turkey	Aklın Yolu Bir	Oktay Kaynarca	TNT	April 2011	Turkish
Ukraine	Що? Де? Коли?	Alexander Androsov	Pershyi Natsionalnyi (2008); K1 (2009–?); Inter (2011); 1+1 (now)	February 2008	Russian, Ukrainian
United States	Million Dollar Mind Game (The Skatoony Spin-off)	(United Kingdom) Vernon Kay	ABC	October 30, 2010	English
Uzbekistan	Zakovat	Abdurasul Abdullayev	Oʻzbekiston	2001	Uzbek

The Tajikistani version is unlicensed, and was not made by Igra-tv. It's Called Intellekt-Shou on Channel TV Safina.

== Competitive game ==
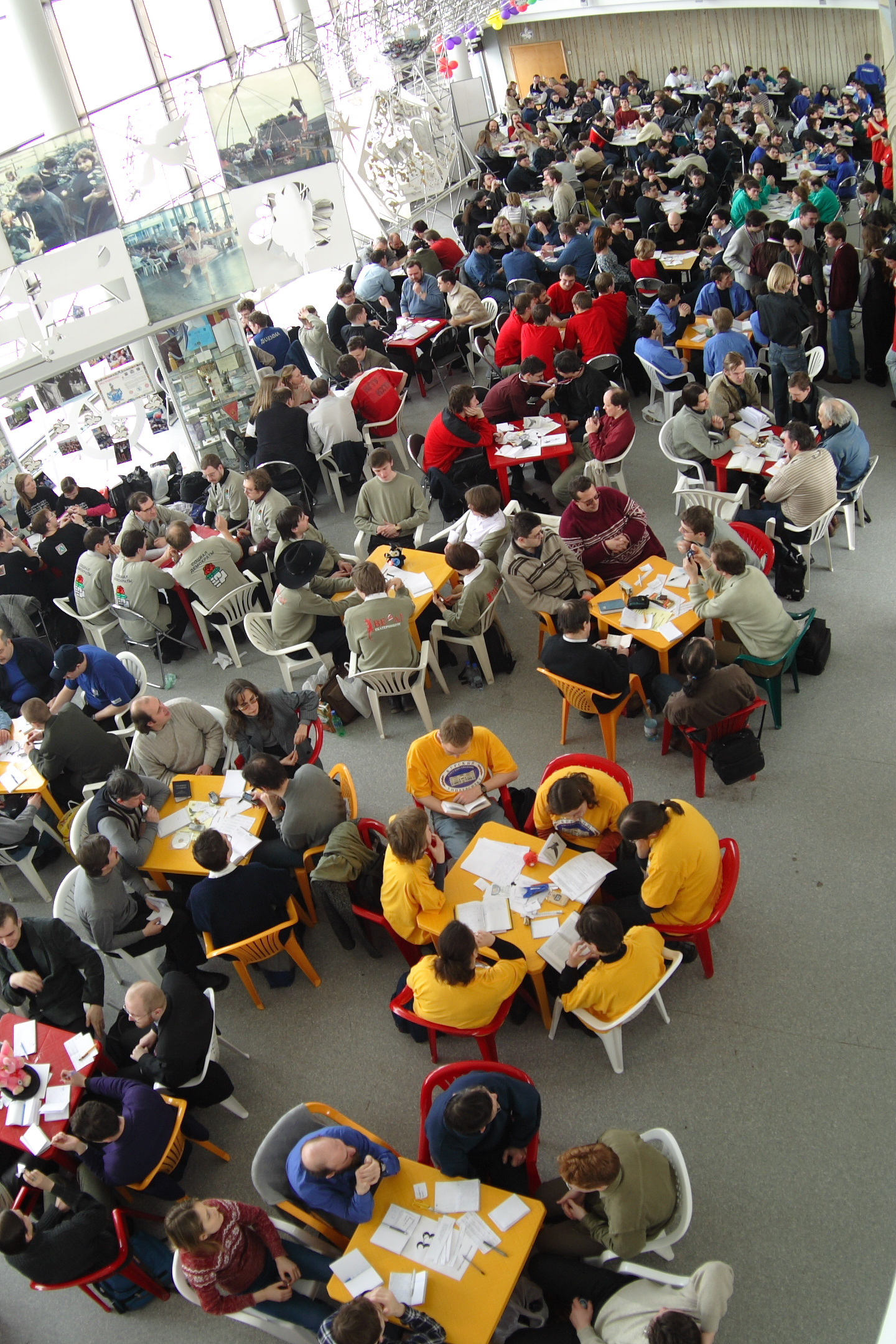
What? Where? When? tournament

In addition to the original TV version, which to this date is one of the most popular TV programs in Russia, a competitive variant exists that is played by over 50,000 teams in all countries of the former USSR and in Russian-speaking diasporas around the world, most notably in Israel, Germany, Finland, United Kingdom, United States and Canada. Although Russian is the official language of most national and all international tournaments, there are some countries like Bulgaria, Moldova, Uzbekistan and Georgia where non-Russian-language teams are more numerous.

=== World Championships ===
Face-to-face World Championships have been held every year since 2002 with corporate sponsorship and under the aegis of TV Igra and the governments and National Olympic committees of Russia and Azerbaijan. The 2010 championship took place in Israel with sponsorship of Euro-Asian Jewish Congress. The 2020 and 2021 editions were cancelled because of the COVID-19 pandemic and the 2022 edition was cancelled due to the Russian invasion of Ukraine.

To qualify, 4 methods exist:

- Win a duly certified national championship, which must contain a minimum of 45 questions
- Win a major international tournament with the status of Worlds qualifier
- Reach a sufficiently high rank on the MAII rating leaderboard
- Obtain a wildcard invitation from the organizing committee (a maximum of 5 teams can qualify that way; most wildcard invitations are issued to teams from emerging ChGK countries)

These competitions rely on logic rather than knowledge too, but usually require more erudition than the TV versions due to high educational level of the players.

== See also ==
- Neskuchny Garden, a place of What? Where? When?
