= Neskuchny Garden =

Garden in Moscow, Russia

Coordinates: 55.7161°N 37.5881°E

- Нескучный сад
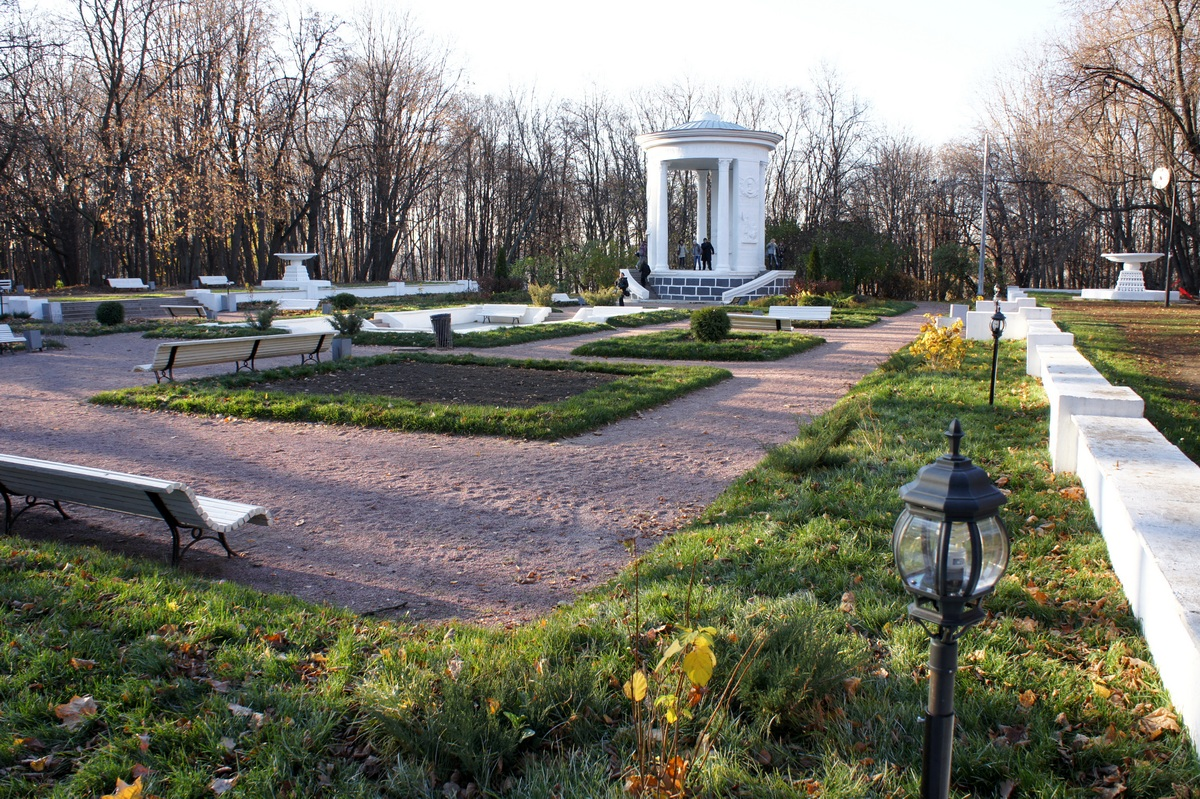
- Location in Moscow
- Location: Moscow, Russia
- Area: 59.3 hectares (147 acres)
- Open: 1756
- Public transit: Oktyabrskaya; Oktyabrskaya; Leninsky Prospekt; Shabolovskaya; Frunzenskaya

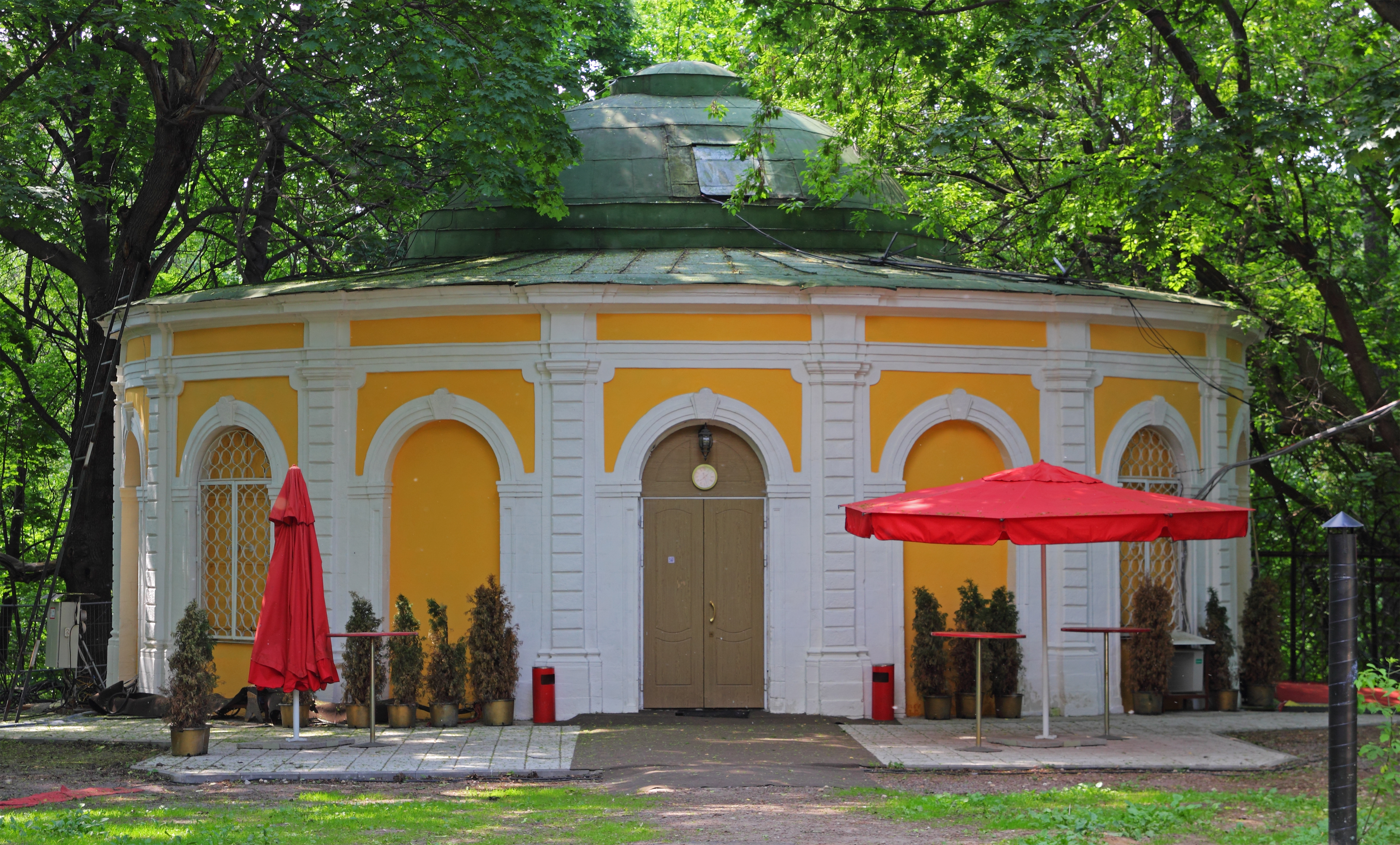
The pavilion in Neskuchny Garden where the game What? Where? When? takes place

Neskuchny Garden (Russian: Неску́чный сад; literally meaning "not boring" or "merry") is the oldest park in Moscow, Russia. With an area of 40.8 hectares (101 acres) and a former Emperor's residence, created as a result of the integration of three estates in the 18th century, it also contains the Green Theater, one of the largest open amphitheaters in Europe, which can sit 15,000 people.

TV broadcasting of famous game What? Where? When? (Russian: Что? Где? Когда?) takes place in the Okhotnichy domik that is located in the Neskuchny Garden.
