= Flag of Khanty-Mansi Autonomous Okrug =

Flag of the Russian autonomous okrug of Khanty-Mansi

Khanty-Mansi Autonomous Okrug
- Proportion: 1:2
- Adopted: 20 September 1995
- Design: A rectangular field arranged with two strips at even proportions (azure on top, and green on bottom) and a stylized crown on the azure strip.

The flag of Khanty-Mansi Autonomous Okrug (Note: Russian: Флаг Ханты-Мансийского автономного округа — Югры; Khanty: Ханты-Мансийской автономной округ - Югра флаг; Mansi: Ханты-Мансийский автономный округ - Югра флаг), in the Russian Federation, is a rectangular field arranged with two strips at even proportions (azure on top, and green on bottom). A vertical white strip is attached to the fly side of the flag. A stylized crown at the upper hoist side is charged on the azure strip.

The flag was adopted on 20 September 1995. The crown was modified on December 6 of that same year. The proportions are 1:2.

== Other flags ==
=== Administrative divisions ===
Flag	Date	Use	Description
	2002–present	Flag of Khanty-Mansiysk	
	2000–2002	Flag of Khanty-Mansiysk	
	1997–present	Flag of Langepas	
	2001–present	Flag of Megion	
	?–present	Flag of Nefteyugansk	
	2003–present	Flag of Nizhnevartovsk	
	2005–present	Flag of Surgut	
	2000–present	Flag of Raduzhny	
	1998–present	Flag of Uray	
	?–present	Flag of Nyagan	
	1997–present	Flag of Kogalym	
	?–present	Flag of Pokachi	
	2002–present	Flag of Pyt-Yakh	
	2000–2002	Flag of Pyt-Yakh	
	?–present	Flag of Yugorsk	
	2014–present	Flag of Beryozovsky District	
	2006–present	Flag of Kondinsky District	
	2004–present	Flag of Nefteyugansky District	
	2007–present	Flag of Nizhnevartovsky District	
	1999–2007	Flag of Nizhnevartovsky District	
	?–present	Flag of Oktyabrsky District	
	1998–present	Flag of Sovetsky District	
	2022–present	Flag of Surgutsky District	
	2008–2022	Flag of Surgutsky District	
	?–present	Flag of Khanty-Mansiysky District	

=== Settlement flags ===
Flag	Date	Use	Description
	2008–present	Flag of Agirish	
	2014–present	Flag of Andra	
	?–present	Flag of Sytomino	
	2010–present	Flag of Barsovo	
	2014–present	Flag of Beryozovo	
	2009–2014	Flag of Beryozovo	
	2007–present	Flag of Izluchinsk	
	2016–present	Flag of Kommunistichesky	
	2016–present	Flag of Lugovoy	
	2006–present	Flag of Lyantor	
	2022–present	Flag of Malinovsky	
	2007–present	Flag of Mortka	
	2011–present	Flag of Novoagansk	
	2014–present	Flag of Oktyabrskoye	
	2016–present	Flag of Pionersky	
	2010–present	Flag of Priobye	
	2006–present	Flag of Sovetsky	
	2009–present	Flag of Tayozhny	
	2017–present	Flag of Talinka	
	2012–2017	Flag of Talinka	
	July 2008–present	Flag of Fyodorovsky	
	June 2008–July 2008	Flag of Fyodorovsky	
	2010–present	Flag of Alyabevsky	
	2014–present	Flag of Bolchary	
	2008–2014	Flag of Bolchary	
	2015–present	Flag of Vykatnoy	
	2017–present	Flag of Kamennoe	
	2017–present	Flag of Karymkary	
	2014–present	Flag of Lokosovo	
	2014–present	Flag of Lugovskoy	
	2020–present	Flag of Lyamina	
	2016–present	Flag of Maly Atlym	
	2010–present	Flag of Nizhnesortymsky	
	2018–present	Flag of Peregrebnoye	
	2012–present	Flag of Polnovat	
	2007–present	Flag of Polovinka	
	2017–present	Flag of Pripolyarny	
	?–present	Flag of Russkinskaya	
	2010–present	Flag of Saranpaul	
	2011–present	Flag of Sergino	
	2009–present	Flag of Solnechny	
	2019–present	Flag of Tundrino	
	2010–present	Flag of Ult-Yagun	
	2015–present	Flag of Unyugan	
	2013–present	Flag of Shapsha	
	2018–present	Flag of Sherkaly	

== See also ==
- Coat of arms of Khanty-Mansi Autonomous Okrug
- Anthem of Khanty-Mansi Autonomous Okrug
