= Administrative divisions of Khanty-Mansi Autonomous Okrug =

Administrative districts of Russian federal subject

Khanty-Mansi Autonomous Okrug Russia
- Administrative centre: Khanty-Mansiysk

Administrative structure (as of 2013)
- Districts: 9
- Cities/towns: 16
- Urban-type settlements: 24
- Selsovets: 0

Municipal structure (as of 2002)
- Rural settlements: 173 (inhabited); 4 (uninhabited)

Map of Khanty-Manson Autonomous Okrug (with numbered)

Khanty-Mansi Autonomous Okrug is a federal subject of Russia.

== Administrative and municipal divisions ==
Map

Division	Structure		OKATO	OKTMO	Urban-type settlement/ district-level town*
Division	Administrative	Municipal	OKATO	OKTMO	Urban-type settlement/ district-level town*
Khanty-Mansiysk (Ханты-Мансийск)	city	urban okrug	71 131	71 871	
Langepas (Лангепас)	city	urban okrug	71 132	71 872	
Megion (Мегион)	city	urban okrug	71 133	71 873	Vysoky (Высокий)
Nefteyugansk (Нефтеюганск)	city	urban okrug	71 134	71 874	
Nizhnevartovsk (Нижневартовск)	city	urban okrug	71 135	71 877	
Surgut (Сургут)	city	urban okrug	71 136	71 876	
Raduzhny (Радужный)	city	urban okrug	71 137	71 877	
Uray (Урай)	city	urban okrug	71 138	71 878	
Nyagan (Нягань)	city	urban okrug	71 139	71 879	
Beloyarsky (Белоярский)	city	(under Beloyarsky	71 181	71 811	
Kogalym (Когалым)	city	urban okrug	71 183	71 883	
Pokachi (Покачи)	city	urban okrug	71 184	71 884	
Pyt-Yakh (Пыть-Ях)	city	urban okrug	71 185	71 885	
Yugorsk (Югорск)	city	urban okrug	71 187	71 887	
Beloyarsky (Белоярский)	district		71 111	71 811	
Beryozovsky (Берёзовский)	district		71 112	71 812	Beryozovo (Берёзово); Igrim (Игрим)
Kondinsky (Кондинский)	district		71 116	71 816	Kondinskoye (Кондинское); Kuminsky (Куминский); Lugovoy (Луговой); Mezhdurechensky (Междуреченский); Mortka (Мортка)
Nefteyugansky (Нефтеюганский)	district		71 118	71 818	Poykovsky (Пойковский)
Nizhnevartovsky (Нижневартовский)	district		71 119	71 819	Izluchinsk (Излучинск); Novoagansk (Новоаганск)
Oktyabrsky (Октябрьский)	district		71 121	71 821	Andra (Андра); Oktyabrskoye (Октябрьское); Priobye (Приобье); Talinka (Талинка)
Sovetsky (Советский)	district		71 124	71 824	Sovetsky (Советский) town*; Agirish (Агириш); Kommunistichesky (Коммунистический); Malinovsky (Малиновский); Pionersky (Пионерский); Tayozhny (Таёжный); Zelenoborsk (Зеленоборск)
Surgutsky (Сургутский)	district		71 126	71 826	Lyantor (Лянтор) town*; Barsovo (Барсово); Bely Yar (Белый Яр); Fyodorovsky (Фёдоровский)
Khanty-Mansiysky (Ханты-Мансийский)	district		71 129	71 829	
