= Sergino =

Set index of articles associated with the same name

Sergino (Russian: Сергино) is the name of several rural localities in Russia:

- Sergino, Astrakhan Oblast, a selo in Ozernovsky Selsoviet of Ikryaninsky District of Astrakhan Oblast
- Sergino, Bryansk Oblast, a village in Alexeyevsky Selsoviet of Navlinsky District of Bryansk Oblast
- Sergino, Khanty-Mansi Autonomous Okrug, a settlement in Oktyabrsky District of Khanty-Mansi Autonomous Okrug
- Sergino, Krasnoyarsk Krai, a settlement in Zhukovsky Selsoviet of Kozulsky District of Krasnoyarsk Krai
- Sergino, Varnavinsky District, Nizhny Novgorod Oblast, a village in Bogorodsky Selsoviet of Varnavinsky District of Nizhny Novgorod Oblast
- Sergino, Vetluzhsky District, Nizhny Novgorod Oblast, a village in Makaryevsky Selsoviet of Vetluzhsky District of Nizhny Novgorod Oblast
- Sergino, Chanovsky District, Novosibirsk Oblast, a village in Chanovsky District, Novosibirsk Oblast
- Sergino, Kuybyshevsky District, Novosibirsk Oblast, a selo in Kuybyshevsky District, Novosibirsk Oblast
- Sergino, Lysva, Perm Krai, a village under the administrative jurisdiction of the town of krai significance of Lysva, Perm Krai
- Sergino, Karagaysky District, Perm Krai, a village in Karagaysky District, Perm Krai
- Sergino, Kishertsky District, Perm Krai, a village in Kishertsky District, Perm Krai
- Sergino, Nytvensky District, Perm Krai, a selo in Nytvensky District, Perm Krai
- Sergino, Kunyinsky District, Pskov Oblast, a village in Kunyinsky District, Pskov Oblast
- Sergino, Novosokolnichesky District, Pskov Oblast, a village in Novosokolnichesky District, Pskov Oblast
- Sergino, Ostrovsky District, Pskov Oblast, a village in Ostrovsky District, Pskov Oblast
- Sergino (Kachanovskaya Rural Settlement), Palkinsky District, Pskov Oblast, a village in Palkinsky District, Pskov Oblast; municipally, a part of Kachanovskaya Rural Settlement of that district
- Sergino (Vasilyevskaya Rural Settlement), Palkinsky District, Pskov Oblast, a village in Palkinsky District, Pskov Oblast; municipally, a part of Vasilyevskaya Rural Settlement of that district
- Sergino (Rodovskaya Rural Settlement), Palkinsky District, Pskov Oblast, a village in Palkinsky District, Pskov Oblast; municipally, a part of Rodovskaya Rural Settlement of that district
- Sergino (Rodovskaya Rural Settlement), Palkinsky District, Pskov Oblast, a village in Palkinsky District, Pskov Oblast; municipally, a part of Rodovskaya Rural Settlement of that district
- Sergino, Sverdlovsk Oblast, a village in Tavdinsky District of Sverdlovsk Oblast
- Sergino, Staritsky District, Tver Oblast, a village in Bernovskoye Rural Settlement of Staritsky District of Tver Oblast
- Sergino, Udomelsky District, Tver Oblast, a village in Yeremkovskoye Rural Settlement of Udomelsky District of Tver Oblast
- Sergino, Udmurt Republic, a selo in Serginsky Selsoviet of Balezinsky District of the Udmurt Republic
