= Barsovo =

Barsovo (Russian: Барсово) is the name of several inhabited localities in Russia.

Urban localities

- Barsovo, Khanty-Mansi Autonomous Okrug, an urban-type settlement in Surgutsky District of Khanty-Mansi Autonomous Okrug

Rural localities

- Barsovo (railway crossing loop), Tver Oblast, a railway crossing loop in Starotoropskoye Rural Settlement of Zapadnodvinsky District in Tver Oblast
- Barsovo (village), Tver Oblast, a village in Starotoropskoye Rural Settlement of Zapadnodvinsky District in Tver Oblast
- Barsovo, Vladimir Oblast, a settlement in Kirzhachsky District of Vladimir Oblast
