= Vysoky, Khanty-Mansi Autonomous Okrug =

Vysokiy Высокий
- Town
- Coat of arms
- Interactive map of Vysokiy
- Location of Vysokiy Vysokiy (Khanty–Mansi Autonomous Okrug)
- Coordinates: 61°09′36″N 75°58′30″E
- Country: Russia
- Federal subject: Khanty-Mansi Autonomous Okrug
- Founded: 1982
- Town status since: 1982

Government
  - Body: Duma
  - Head: Mikhail Igitov

Population (2010 Census)
  - Total: 7,031
  - Estimate (2021): 6,537 (−7%)

Administrative status
  - Subordinated to: town of okrug significance of Megion
  - Capital of: town of okrug significance of Megion

Municipal status
  - Urban okrug: Megion Urban Okrug
  - Capital of: Megion Urban Okrug
- Time zone: UTC+5 (MSK+2)
- Postal code: 628690
- Dialing code: +7 34643
- OKTMO ID: 71873000056

Vysokiy is an urban-type settlement in Khanty-Mansi Autonomous Okrug of Russia. It is subordinated to the city of Megion. Vysoky had a population of 7031 in 2014.

== Geography ==
The village is located close to the Vatinsky Yogan riverbank.

=== Geographical position ===
Distance city:

City	Distance (km)	Direction
Megion	16,5	Southeast
Нижневартовск	40	Southeast
Raduzhny, Khanty-Mansi Autonomous Okrug	130	Northeast
Surgut	135	West
