= Sergino, Khanty-Mansi Autonomous Okrug =

Sergino Сергино
- Settlement
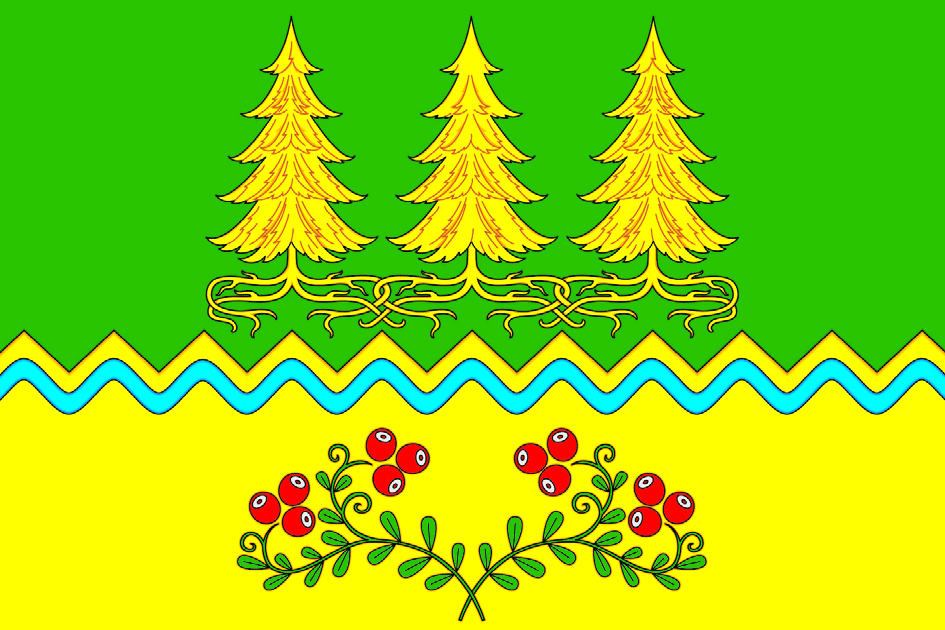
- Flag
- Interactive map of Sergino
- Location of Sergino Sergino (Khanty–Mansi Autonomous Okrug)
- Coordinates: 62°27′N 65°35′E
- Country: Russia
- Federal subject: Khanty-Mansi Autonomous Okrug
- Administrative district: Oktyabrsky District

Population
  - Estimate (2008): 1,490 )

Municipal status
  - Municipal district: Oktyabrsky Municipal District
  - Rural settlement: Sergino Rural Settlement
  - Capital of: Sergino Rural Settlement
- Time zone: UTC+5 (MSK+2)
- Postal code: 628111
- OKTMO ID: 71821432101

Sergino (Russian: Сергино) is a rural locality (a settlement) in Oktyabrsky District of Khanty-Mansi Autonomous Okrug, Russia, located on the left bank of the Ob River. As of 2008, it had a population of 1,490 people.

== Etymology ==
The name of the settlement is derived from the name Sergi, which is a Mansi form of the Russian name Sergey. At some point in the past, the yurts of a person named Sergi were located in this area; hence the name.

== Transportation ==
Sergino has a railway station on the railway which connects Serov and Priobye. There is a regular but infrequent passenger traffic.

There is a road connecting Sergino to both Priobye and Nyagan with further connections to Ivdel and Khanty-Mansiysk.

The Ob is navigable, but there is no port in Sergino, which is located a bit away from the main stream channel. The closest port is located in Priobye.
