= Zelenoborsk =

Zelenoborsk Зеленоборск
- Urban-type settlement
- Interactive map of Zelenoborsk
- Location of Zelenoborsk Zelenoborsk (Khanty–Mansi Autonomous Okrug)
- Coordinates: 61.4731°N 64.0459°E
- Country: Russia
- Federal subject: Khanty-Mansi Autonomous Okrug
- Administrative district: Sovetsky District
- Founded: 1963

Population (2010 Census)
  - Total: 2,379
  - Estimate (2021): 1,778 (−25.3%)
- Time zone: UTC+5 (MSK+2)
- Postal code: 628247
- OKTMO ID: 71824153051

Zelenoborsk (Russian: Зеленоборск) is an urban locality (an urban-type settlement) in Sovetsky District of Khanty-Mansi Autonomous Okrug, Russia. Population: 2,379 (2010 census); 2,209 (2002 census); 2,645 (1989 Soviet census).
