= Mortka =

Mortka Мортка
- Urban-type settlement
- Flag
- Interactive map of Mortka
- Location of Mortka Mortka (Khanty–Mansi Autonomous Okrug)
- Coordinates: 59°20′N 66°01′E
- Country: Russia
- Federal subject: Khanty-Mansi Autonomous Okrug
- Administrative district: Kondinsky District
- Elevation: 81 m (266 ft)

Population (2010 Census)
  - Total: 3,798
  - Estimate (2021): 3,233 (−14.9%)
- Time zone: UTC+5 (MSK+2)
- Postal code: 628206
- OKTMO ID: 71816163051

Mortka (Russian: Мортка) is an urban locality (an urban-type settlement) in Kondinsky District of Khanty–Mansi Autonomous Okrug, Russia. Population: 3,798 (2010 census); 3,627 (2002 census); 3,431 (1989 Soviet census).

Mortka has a train station operated by Russian Railways. The station is part of the Yekaterinburg - Mezhdurechenskiy line and the Таvdа - Ustje-Aha line.

== History ==
Founded in September 1967, Mortka emerged as a logging station among swamps and taiga. Over the next decades, it developed into a village, with its growth closely tied to the forest industry.

On June 1, 1972, the settlement of Mortka was classified as an urban-type settlement.

In 1973, Mortka constructed its first school, accommodating 960 students. Other developments included two kindergarten buildings for 250 children, a sports complex, a 40-bed hospital, and a House of Culture with a music school and library. In 2005, a bath and laundry complex was completed, alongside the construction of a wooden Orthodox Church.

Infrastructure improvements continued through the 1990s, with 85% of streets paved. By 2003, two intra-village bus routes were introduced, and the construction of permanent sidewalks began. The “Clean Water” district program led to the establishment of a modern water purification system in 2002.

== Government ==
Mortka is governed by a Council of Deputies with 10 deputies. As of 2025 the Council is led by the Chairman Karyakin Igor Viktorovich.
