= Kondinskoye, Khanty-Mansi Autonomous Okrug =

Kondinskoye Кондинское
- Urban-type settlement
- Interactive map of Kondinskoye
- Location of Kondinskoye Kondinskoye (Khanty–Mansi Autonomous Okrug)
- Coordinates: 59°39′00″N 67°24′36″E
- Country: Russia
- Federal subject: Khanty-Mansi Autonomous Okrug
- Administrative district: Kondinsky District
- Founded: 1847

Population (2010 Census)
  - Total: 3,616
  - Estimate (2021): 2,690 (−25.6%)
- Time zone: UTC+5 (MSK+2)
- Postal code: 628210
- OKTMO ID: 71816151051

Kondinskoye (Russian: Кондинское; Mansi: Мотус, Motus) is an urban locality (an urban-type settlement) in Kondinsky District of Khanty–Mansi Autonomous Okrug, Russia. Population: 3,616 (2010 census); 4,086 (2002 census); 5,125 (1989 Soviet census).
