= Kuminsky =

Kuminsky Куминский
- Urban-type settlement
- Interactive map of Kuminsky
- Location of Kuminsky Kuminsky (Khanty–Mansi Autonomous Okrug)
- Coordinates: 58.8078°N 65.9735°E
- Country: Russia
- Federal subject: Khanty-Mansi Autonomous Okrug
- Administrative district: Kondinsky District
- Founded: 1963

Population (2010 Census)
  - Total: 3,116
  - Estimate (2021): 2,504 (−19.6%)
- Time zone: UTC+5 (MSK+2)
- Postal code: 628205
- OKTMO ID: 71816154051

Kuminsky (Russian: Куминский) is an urban locality (an urban-type settlement) in Kondinsky District of Khanty-Mansi Autonomous Okrug, Russia. Population: 3,116 (2010 census); 2,805 (2002 census); 3,378 (1989 Soviet census).
