= Kommunistichesky =

Kommunistichesky Коммунистический
- Urban-type settlement
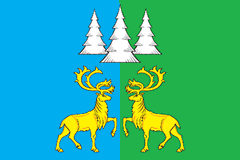
- Flag
- Interactive map of Kommunistichesky
- Location of Kommunistichesky Kommunistichesky (Khanty–Mansi Autonomous Okrug)
- Coordinates: 61.6789°N 64.4837°E
- Country: Russia
- Federal subject: Khanty-Mansi Autonomous Okrug
- Administrative district: Sovetsky District
- Founded: 1965

Population (2010 Census)
  - Total: 2,423
  - Estimate (2021): 1,515 (−37.5%)
- Time zone: UTC+5 (MSK+2)
- Postal code: 628256
- OKTMO ID: 71824155051

Kommunistichesky (Russian: Коммунистический; Mansi: Самза, Samza) is an urban locality (an urban-type settlement) in Sovetsky District of Khanty-Mansi Autonomous Okrug, Russia. Population: 2,423 (2010 census); 2,638 (2002 census); 4,108 (1989 Soviet census).
