= Anthem of Khanty-Mansi Autonomous Okrug =

Anthem of a Russian federal subject

Gimn Khanty-Mansiyskogo avtonomnogo okruga — Yugry
English: Anthem of the Khanty-Mansi Autonomous Okrug
- Гимн Ханты-Мансийского автономного округа — Югры
- Coat of arms of the Khanty-Mansi Autonomous Okrug
- Region anthem of Khanty-Mansi Autonomous Okrug
- Lyrics: Alexander Radchenko
- Music: Alexander Radchenko, Viktor Khudoley
- Adopted: 24 November 2004

Audio sample
- Official orchestral and choral vocal recording: file; help

Official band instrumental recording

The Anthem of the Khanty-Mansi Autonomous Okrug (Russian: Гимн Ханты-Мансийского автономного округа) is the anthem of the Khanty-Mansi Autonomous Okrug, a federal subject of Russia. It is one of the national symbols of the Khanty-Mansi Autonomous Okrug along with its flag and coat of arms. It was written by Alexander Radchenko with music by Radchenko and Viktor Khudoley and was officially adopted in 2004. It was translated to the Northern Khanty by Zoya Nov'yukhova in 2019, and to Northern Mansi by Svetlana Dinislamova

== Lyrics ==
Russian original

Наш округ — седой богатырь
Свой дух возродил величаво,
Опора России — Урал и Сибирь!
Гордимся Югрою по праву!

Припев:
Югра многоликая,
Делами великая
Идет вдохновенно вперед!
Мы пишем историю
Любимой Югории
И славим Югорский народ!

Под небом сибирской земли
Богатства от края до края,
И крылья надежды мы здесь обрели,
Югру на века прославляя!

Припев

Югра — ты прекрасный наш дом,
Здесь ценят всегда человека,
И нашим упорством, и нашим трудом
Тебе процветать век от века!

Припев

Khanty translation

Округев ишикты ар, округев пирӑщ похaтур,
Ԯыԯӑңа иԯта нŏх павтӑс.
Урал па Сибирь – ԯын шэңк нётԯӑңӑн вуԯты
Россияя тащӑңа па ŏяңа.

Хӑр:
Югра – ар хураспи ю̆х,
Арсыр верӑт верԯӑԯўв,
Еԯԯы хӑрщия шушԯ.
Тӑта вуԯты миревн мўвев
Нŏх щи аԯŏмԯа.
Я̆м верԯaԯ ԯыв ю̆пеԯн хӑщԯӑт.

Мўвев тӑйԯ арсыр тащ.
Турŏм ащийн миюм ԯўв,
Тӑта, аԯмунтыки, тухԯӑң энумԯаюв,
Маркӑңа, аԯпа, мўң йиԯўв.

Хӑр

Югра – щит мўң мосты хотэв,
Хӑннэху тӑта мосман тӑйԯа,
Мўң, верaты кемевн, нӑңен нётты питԯўв
Еԯԯы энŏмты, нŏх пaвтӑсты.

Хӑр

Mansi translation

Ма̄н округув – во̄тым о̄тыр,
Тав нотэ ма̄н о̄с ялтуптэ̄в,
Нё̄ты Россиян – Урал ос Сибирь!
Ты ма̄гыс Юграв янытлэ̄в!

Припев (Хорыӈ / Китнтыг э̄ргыглыл):
Югра са̄в мирн о̄лаве,
Тэ̄латл ёмас ва̄раве,
Э̄лаль тав мины э̄рнэ сир!
Ва̄глӯв о̄лум о̄лупсав,
Э̄руптэ̄в Югорияв,
Oс янытлылӯв Югорский мир!

То̄румувн сибирский ма̄в
Та̄глыӈыг сюнил пиныма,
Товыт майве̄сыт ма̄нав,
О̄лэ̄в, Юграв янытлыма!

Припев (Хорыӈ / Китнтыг э̄ргыглыл)

Югра - наӈ ма̄н нё̄тнэ колув,
Тыт хо̄тпат акваг янытлавет,
Наӈын ат са̄литылӯв ё̄рув,
Вос аквписыг тэ̄ланын са̄вмавет!

Припев (Хорыӈ / Китнтыг э̄ргыглыл):

English translation

Our okrug – our grizzled hero
His spirit revived majestically,
With support by Russia – Urals and Siberia!
Proud Yugra on the right!

Chorus:
The many faces of Yugra,
Of great works
Progress with inspiration!
We are writing the history
Of the beloved Yugra
And the people of Yugra!

Beneath the sky is our Siberian land
With wealth from land to land,
We have found the wings of hope here,
The Yugra is forever praising!

Chorus

Yugra – you're our beautiful home,
There are always people who appreciate,
And our tenacity, and our labor
You thrive on the age of the century!

Chorus

== See also ==
- Flag of Khanty-Mansi Autonomous Okrug
