= Fyodorovsky, Khanty-Mansi Autonomous Okrug =

Fyodorovsky Фёдоровский
- Urban-type settlement
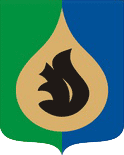
- Flag Coat of arms
- Location of Fyodorovsky
- Location of Fyodorovsky Fyodorovsky (Khanty–Mansi Autonomous Okrug)
- Coordinates: 61.6074°N 73.7238°E
- Country: Russia
- Federal subject: Khanty-Mansi Autonomous Okrug
- Administrative district: Surgutsky District
- Founded: 1984

Population (2010 Census)
  - Total: 20,288
- Time zone: UTC+5 (MSK+2)
- Postal code(s): 628456
- OKTMO ID: 71826165051

Fyodorovsky (Russian: Фёдоровский) is an urban locality (an urban-type settlement) in Surgutsky District of Khanty-Mansi Autonomous Okrug, Russia. Population: 20,288 (2010 Census); 18,406 (2002 Census); 10,295 (1989 Soviet census).
