= Novoagansk =

Novoagansk Новоаганск
- Urban-type settlement
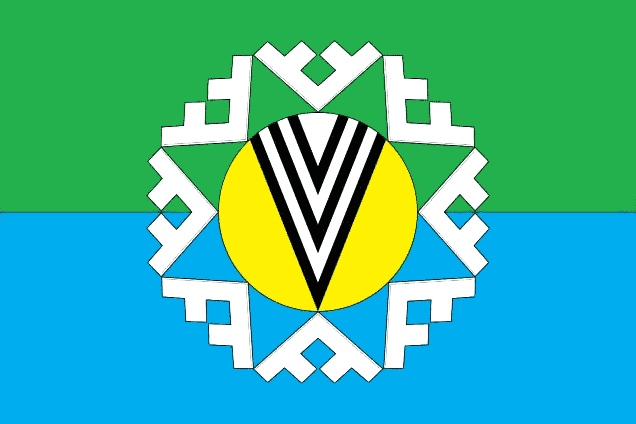
- Flag
- Interactive map of Novoagansk
- Location of Novoagansk Novoagansk (Khanty–Mansi Autonomous Okrug)
- Coordinates: 61.9462°N 76.6745°E
- Country: Russia
- Federal subject: Khanty-Mansi Autonomous Okrug
- Administrative district: Nizhnevartovsky District
- Founded: 1966
- Elevation: 64 m (210 ft)

Population (2010 Census)
  - Total: 10,343
  - Estimate (2021): 9,116 (−11.9%)
- Time zone: UTC+5 (MSK+2)
- Postal code: 628647
- OKTMO ID: 71819156051

Novoagansk (Russian: Новоаганск) is an urban locality (an urban-type settlement) in Nizhnevartovsky District of Khanty-Mansi Autonomous Okrug, Russia. Population: 10,343 (2010 census); 9,717 (2002 census); 10,050 (1989 Soviet census).
