= Malinovsky (urban-type settlement) =

Malinovsky Малиновский
- Urban-type settlement
- Interactive map of Malinovsky
- Location of Malinovsky Malinovsky (Khanty–Mansi Autonomous Okrug)
- Coordinates: 61.1973°N 62.8067°E
- Country: Russia
- Federal subject: Khanty-Mansi Autonomous Okrug
- Administrative district: Sovetsky District
- Founded: 1963

Population (2010 Census)
  - Total: 2,755
  - Estimate (2021): 2,202 (−20.1%)
- Time zone: UTC+5 (MSK+2)
- Postal code: 628251
- OKTMO ID: 71824158051

Malinovsky (Russian: Малиновский) is an urban locality (an urban-type settlement) in Sovetsky District of Khanty-Mansi Autonomous Okrug, Russia. Population: 2,755 (2010 census); 2,621 (2002 census); 2,956 (1989 Soviet census).
