= Andra, Russia =

Andra Андра
- Urban-type settlement
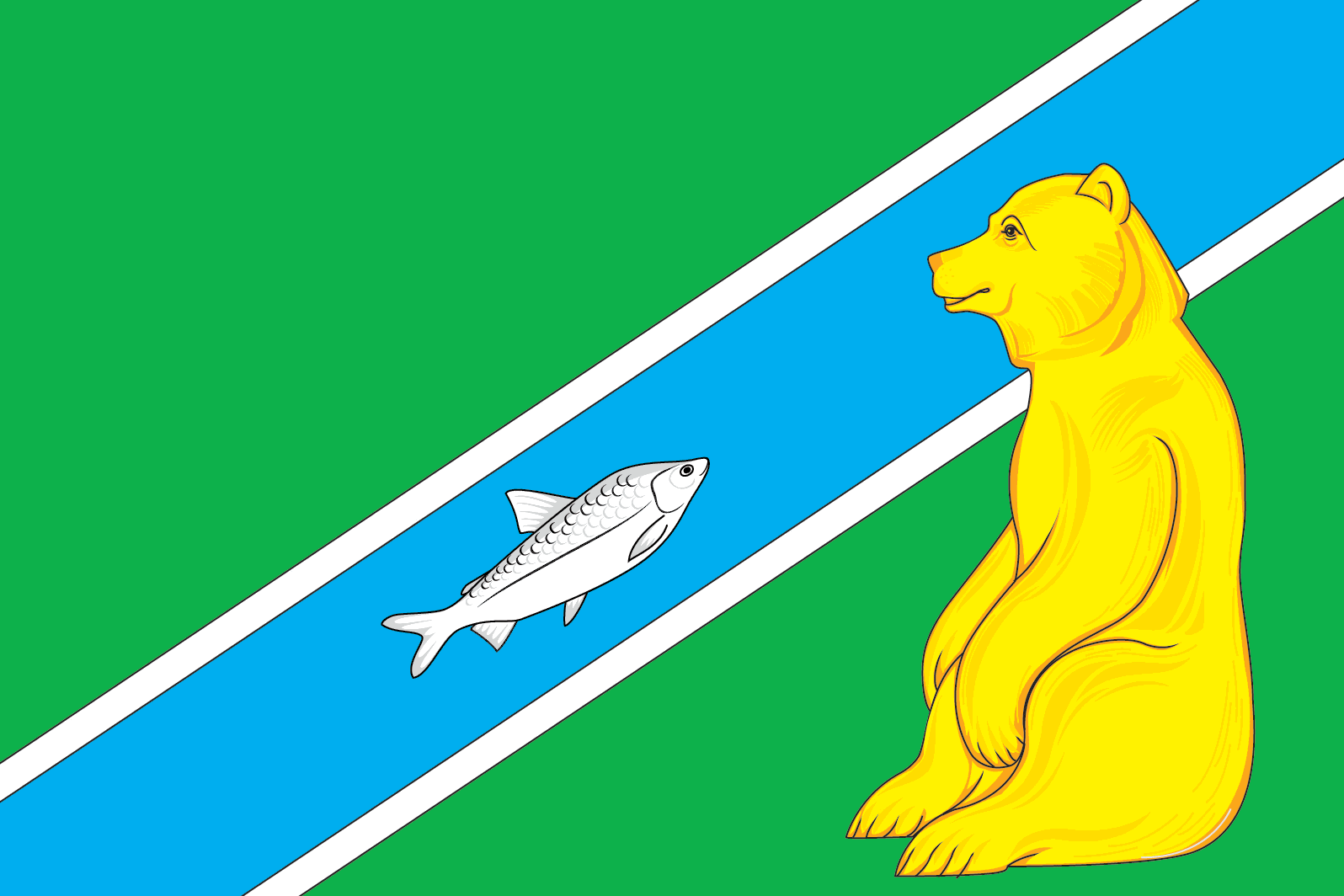
- Flag
- Interactive map of Andra
- Location of Andra Andra (Khanty–Mansi Autonomous Okrug)
- Coordinates: 62°31′N 65°53′E
- Country: Russia
- Federal subject: Khanty-Mansi Autonomous Okrug
- Administrative district: Oktyabrsky District
- Elevation: 74 m (243 ft)

Population (2010 Census)
  - Total: 1,830
  - Estimate (2021): 2,015 (+10.1%)
- Time zone: UTC+5 (MSK+2)
- Postal code: 628125
- OKTMO ID: 71821153051

Andra (Russian: Андра) is an urban locality (an urban-type settlement in Oktyabrsky District of Khanty–Mansi Autonomous Okrug, Russia. Population: 1,830 (2010 census); 1,974 (2002 census); 2,695 (1989 Soviet census).
