= Lugovoy =

Lugovoy Луговой
- Urban-type settlement
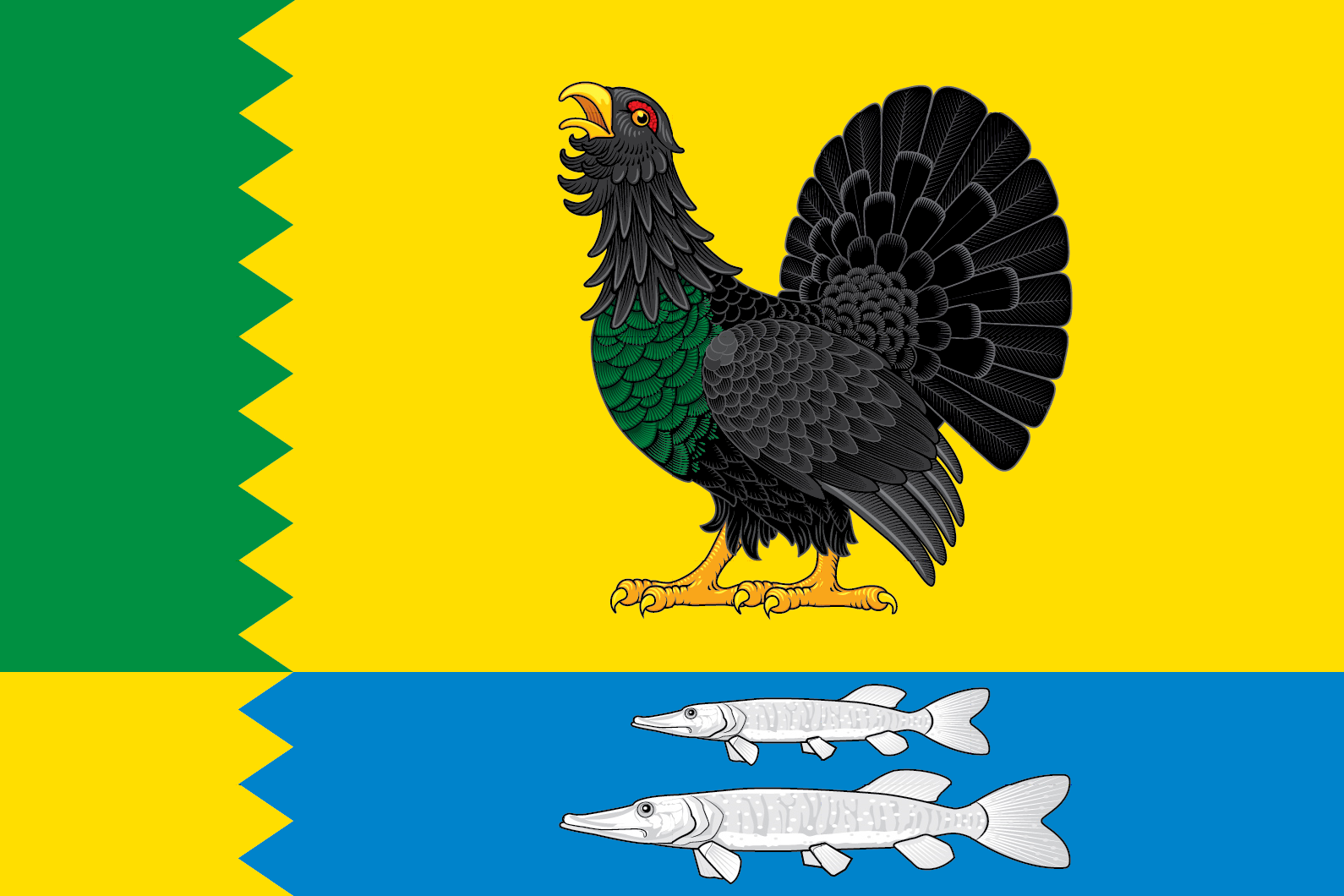
- Flag
- Interactive map of Lugovoy
- Location of Lugovoy Lugovoy (Khanty–Mansi Autonomous Okrug)
- Coordinates: 59.7211°N 65.8897°E
- Country: Russia
- Federal subject: Khanty-Mansi Autonomous Okrug
- Administrative district: Kondinsky District

Population (2010 Census)
  - Total: 1,756
  - Estimate (2021): 1,589 (−9.5%)
- Time zone: UTC+5 (MSK+2)
- Postal code: 628220
- OKTMO ID: 71816157051

Lugovoy (Russian: Лугово́й) is an urban locality (an urban-type settlement) in Kondinsky District of Khanty–Mansi Autonomous Okrug, Russia. Population: 1,756 (2010 census); 1,956 (2002 census); 2,575 (1989 Soviet census).
