= Agirish =

Agirish Агириш
- Urban-type settlement
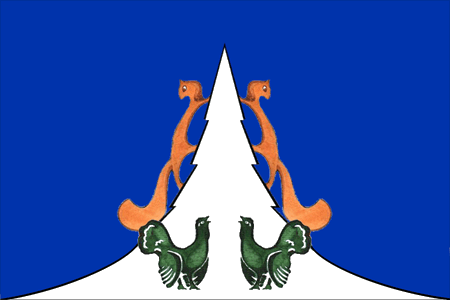
- Flag
- Interactive map of Agirish
- Location of Agirish Agirish (Khanty–Mansi Autonomous Okrug)
- Coordinates: 61°55′46″N 63°00′35″E
- Country: Russia
- Federal subject: Khanty-Mansi Autonomous Okrug
- Administrative district: Sovetsky District
- Elevation: 151 m (495 ft)

Population (2010 Census)
  - Total: 2,856
  - Estimate (2021): 1,638 (−42.6%)

Municipal status
  - Municipal district: Sovetsky Municipal District
  - Urban settlement: Agirish Urban Settlement
  - Capital of: Agirish Urban Settlement
- Time zone: UTC+5 (MSK+2)
- Postal code: 628245
- OKTMO ID: 71824152051

Agirish (Russian: Агириш) is an urban-type settlement in Sovetsky District of Khanty-Mansi Autonomous Okrug, Russia. Population: 2,856 (2010 census); 2,831 (2002 census); 3,592 (1989 Soviet census).
