= Tayozhny, Khanty-Mansi Autonomous Okrug =

Tayozhny Таёжный
- Urban-type settlement
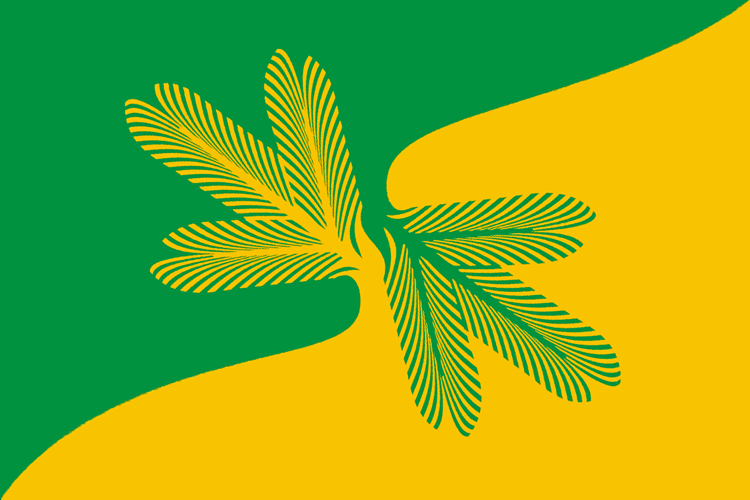
- Flag
- Interactive map of Tayozhny
- Location of Tayozhny Tayozhny (Khanty–Mansi Autonomous Okrug)
- Coordinates: 61.1589°N 62.6833°E
- Country: Russia
- Federal subject: Khanty-Mansi Autonomous Okrug
- Administrative district: Sovetsky District

Population (2010 Census)
  - Total: 2,370
  - Estimate (2021): 1,668 (−29.6%)
- Time zone: UTC+5 (MSK+2)
- Postal code: 628259
- OKTMO ID: 71824159051

Tayozhny (Russian: Таёжный) is an urban locality (an urban-type settlement) in Sovetsky District of Khanty-Mansi Autonomous Okrug, Russia. Population: 2,370 (2010 census); 2,526 (2002 census); 3,236 (1989 Soviet census).
