= Pionersky, Khanty-Mansi Autonomous Okrug =

Pionersky Пионерский
- Urban-type settlement
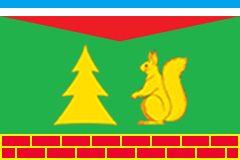
- Flag
- Interactive map of Pionersky
- Location of Pionersky Pionersky (Khanty–Mansi Autonomous Okrug)
- Coordinates: 61.1983°N 62.8591°E
- Country: Russia
- Federal subject: Khanty-Mansi Autonomous Okrug
- Administrative district: Sovetsky District
- Founded: 1961

Population (2010 Census)
  - Total: 5,390
  - Estimate (2021): 4,267 (−20.8%)
- Time zone: UTC+5 (MSK+2)
- Postal code: 628250
- OKTMO ID: 71824157051

Pionersky (Russian: Пионерский) is an urban locality (an urban-type settlement) in Sovetsky District of Khanty-Mansi Autonomous Okrug, Russia. Population: 5,390 (2010 census); 5,245 (2002 census); 6,787 (1989 Soviet census).
