= Talinka =

Talinka Талинка
- Urban-type settlement
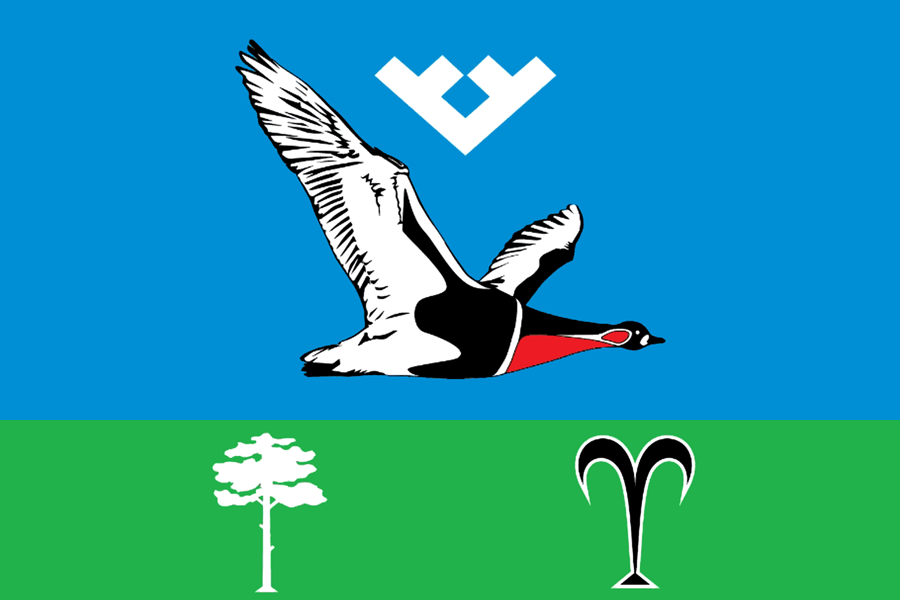
- Flag
- Interactive map of Talinka
- Location of Talinka Talinka (Khanty–Mansi Autonomous Okrug)
- Coordinates: 61°32′51″N 66°26′57″E
- Country: Russia
- Federal subject: Khanty-Mansi Autonomous Okrug
- Administrative district: Oktyabrsky District

Population (2010 Census)
  - Total: 4,121
  - Estimate (2021): 3,333 (−19.1%)
- Time zone: UTC+5 (MSK+2)
- Postal code: 628195
- OKTMO ID: 71821157051

Talinka (Russian: Талинка) is an urban locality (an urban-type settlement) in Oktyabrsky District of Khanty-Mansi Autonomous Okrug, Russia. Population: 4,121 (2010 census); 4,844 (2002 census).
