= Lyantor =

Lyantor Лянтор
- Town
- Flag Coat of arms
- Interactive map of Lyantor
- Location of Lyantor Lyantor (Khanty–Mansi Autonomous Okrug)
- Coordinates: 61°37′N 72°08′E
- Country: Russia
- Federal subject: Khanty-Mansi Autonomous Okrug
- Administrative district: Surgutsky District
- Founded: 1967
- Town status since: 1992
- Elevation: 55 m (180 ft)

Population (2010 Census)
  - Total: 38,992
  - Estimate (2021): 40,977 (+5.1%)

Municipal status
  - Municipal district: Surgutsky Municipal District
  - Urban settlement: Lyantor Urban Settlement
  - Capital of: Lyantor Urban Settlement
- Time zone: UTC+5 (MSK+2)
- Postal code: 628449
- OKTMO ID: 71826105001
- Website: www.admlyantor.ru

Lyantor (Russian: Лянто́р) is a town in Surgutsky District of Khanty–Mansi Autonomous Okrug, Russia, located on the Pim River (Ob's tributary), 625 kilometers (388 mi) northeast of Khanty-Mansiysk, the administrative center of the autonomous okrug. Population: 38,992 (2010 census); 33,011 (2002 census); 22,071 (1989 Soviet census).

== History ==
It was established in 1967 in place of a fishing settlement of Pim due to discovery of oil and natural gas deposits in its vicinity. It was granted work settlement status in 1980 and town status in 1992.

== Administrative and municipal status ==
Within the framework of administrative divisions, Lyantor is subordinated to Surgutsky District. As a municipal division, the town of Lyantor is incorporated within Surgutsky Municipal District as Lyantor Urban Settlement.

== Economy ==
The economy is based on oil extraction.
