= Izluchinsk =

Izluchinsk Излучинск
- Urban-type settlement
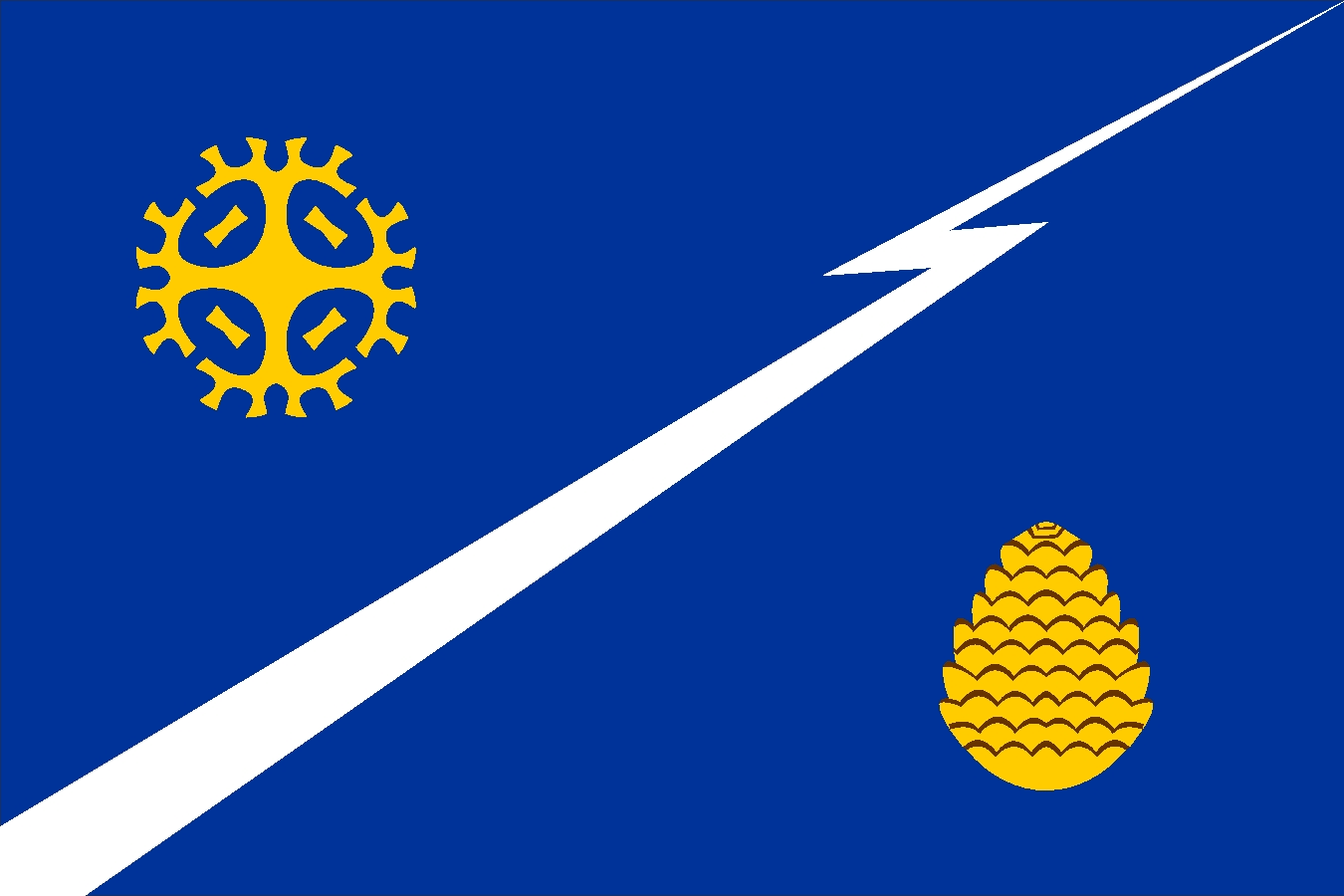
- Flag
- Interactive map of Izluchinsk
- Location of Izluchinsk Izluchinsk (Khanty–Mansi Autonomous Okrug)
- Coordinates: 60.9548°N 76.8935°E
- Country: Russia
- Federal subject: Khanty-Mansi Autonomous Okrug
- Administrative district: Nizhnevartovsky District
- Founded: 1988

Population (2010 Census)
  - Total: 17,399
  - Estimate (2021): 21,389 (+22.9%)
- Time zone: UTC+5 (MSK+2)
- Postal code: 628634
- OKTMO ID: 71819153051

Izluchinsk (Russian: Излучинск) is an urban locality (an urban-type settlement) in Nizhnevartovsky District of Khanty-Mansi Autonomous Okrug, Russia. Population: 17,399 (2010 census); 15,505 (2002 census); 9,646 (1989 Soviet census).
