= Barsovo, Khanty-Mansi Autonomous Okrug =

Barsovo Барсово
- Urban-type settlement
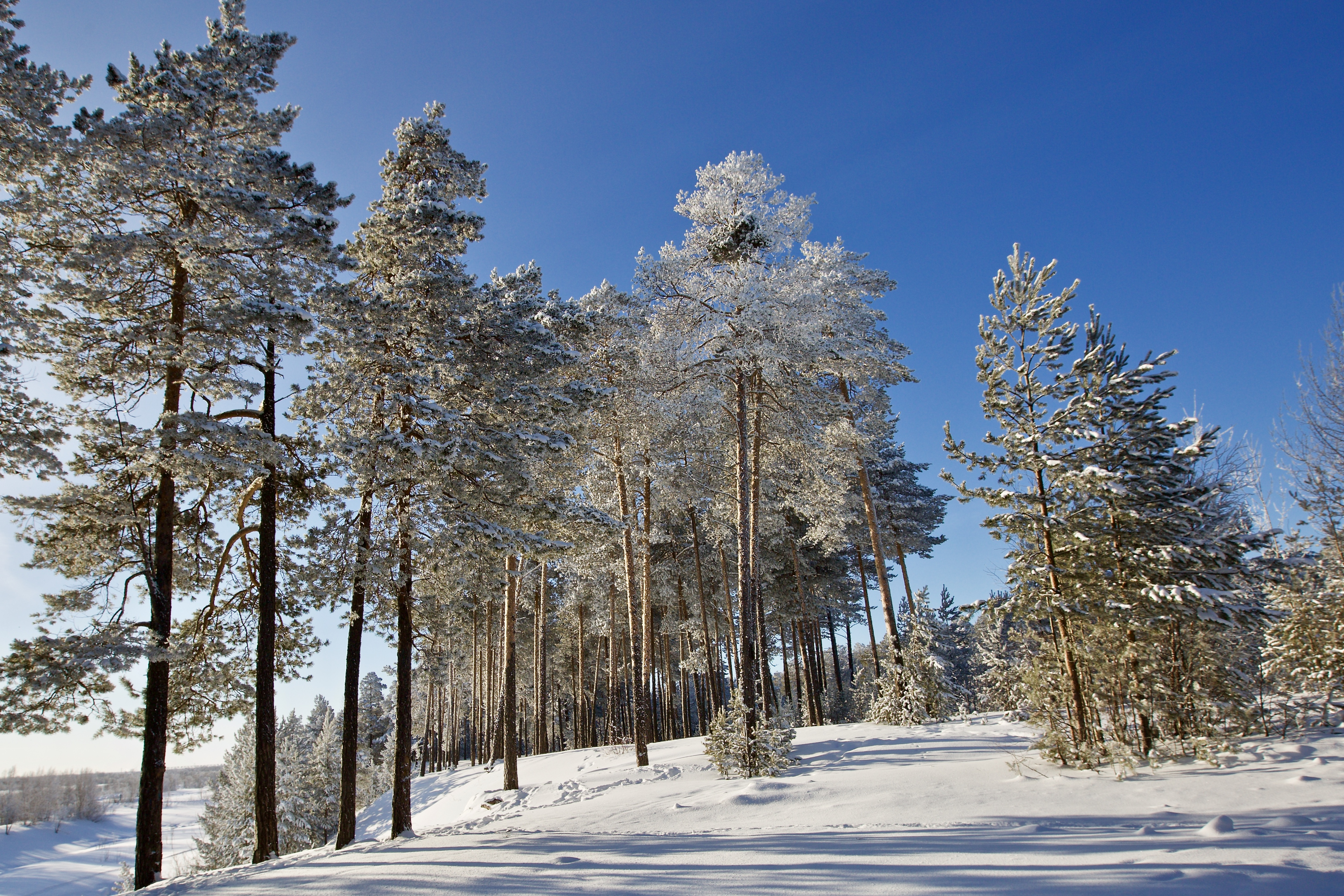

- Flag Coat of arms
- Interactive map of Barsovo
- Location of Barsovo Barsovo (Khanty–Mansi Autonomous Okrug)
- Coordinates: 61°15′11″N 73°11′17″E
- Country: Russia
- Federal subject: Khanty-Mansi Autonomous Okrug
- Administrative district: Surgutsky District
- Founded: 1971

Area
  - Total: 0.662 km^{2} (0.256 sq mi)
- Elevation: 42 m (138 ft)

Population (2010 Census)
  - Total: 4,990
  - Estimate (2021): 6,192 (+24.1%)
  - Density: 7,540/km^{2} (19,500/sq mi)

Municipal status
  - Municipal district: Surgutsky Municipal District
- Time zone: UTC+5 (MSK+2)
- Postal code: 628450
- OKTMO ID: 71826153051
- Website: admbarsovo.ru

Barsovo (Russian: Барсово) is an urban locality (an urban-type settlement) in Surgutsky District of Khanty–Mansi Autonomous Okrug, Russia. Population: 4,990 (2010 census); 5,600 (2002 census); 13,759 (1989 Soviet census).
