= Beryozovsky District, Khanty-Mansi Autonomous Okrug =

Beryozovsky District Берёзовский район (Russian)
- District

Other transcription(s)
  - Mansi: Ха̄льӯс район
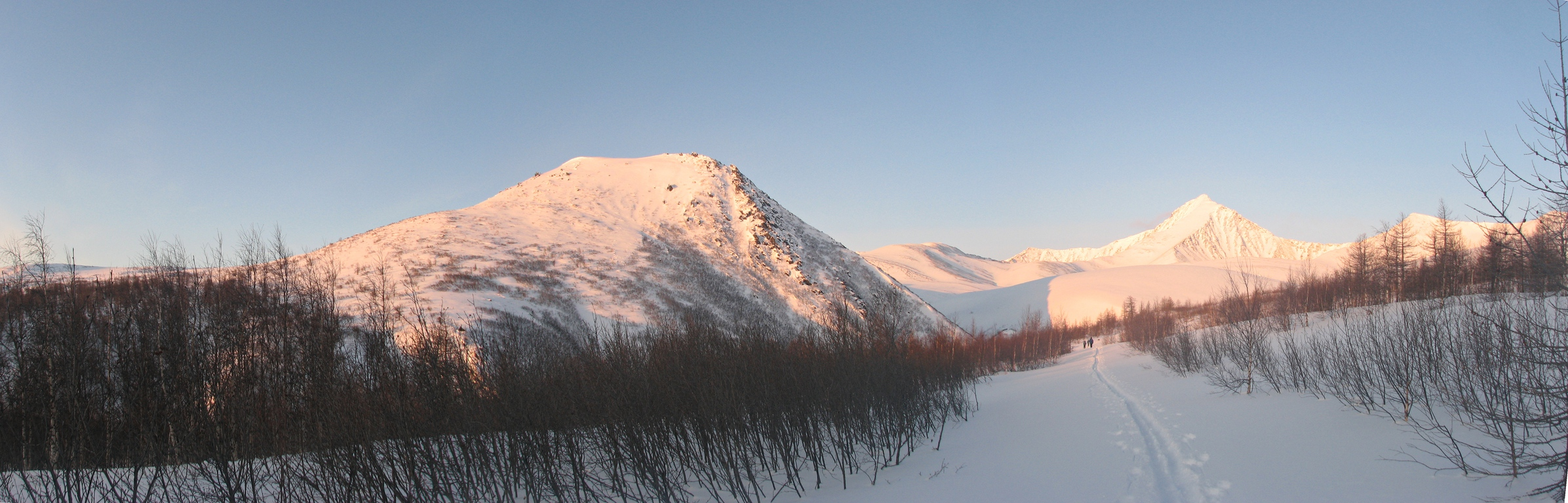
- Mount Neroika, Beryozovsky District

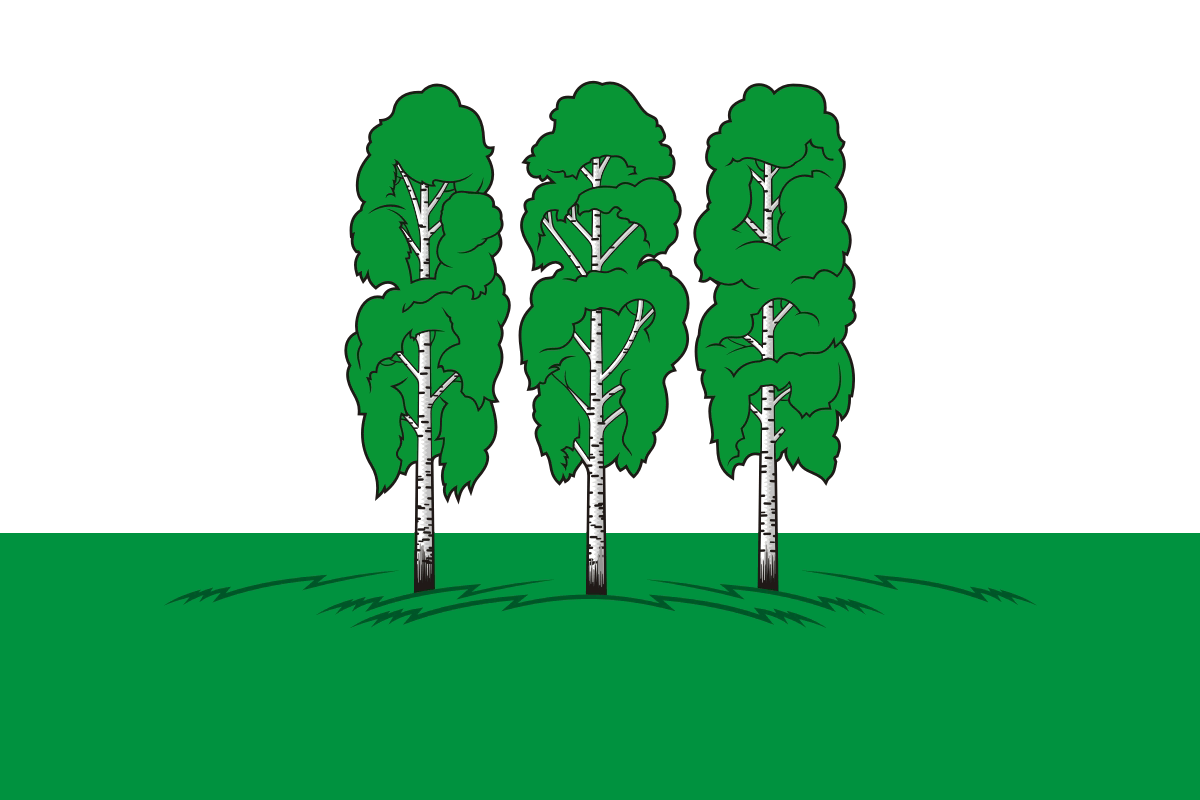
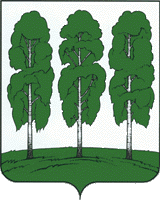
- Flag Coat of arms
- Location of Beryozovsky District in Khanty-Mansi Autonomous Okrug
- Coordinates: 63°56′N 65°03′E
- Country: Russia
- Federal subject: Khanty-Mansi Autonomous Okrug
- Established: 3 November 1923
- Administrative center: Beryozovo

Area
  - Total: 90,000 km^{2} (35,000 sq mi)

Population (2010 Census)
  - Total: 25,744
  - Density: 0.29/km^{2} (0.74/sq mi)
  - Urban: 62.4%
  - Rural: 37.6%

Administrative structure
  - Inhabited localities: 2 urban-type settlements, 24 rural localities

Municipal structure
  - Municipally incorporated as: Beryozovsky Municipal District
  - Municipal divisions: 2 urban settlements, 4 rural settlements
- Time zone: UTC+5 (MSK+2)
- OKTMO ID: 71812000
- Website: http://www.berezovo.ru/

Beryozovsky District (Russian: Берёзовский райо́н, Mansi: Ха̄льӯс район) is an administrative and municipal district (raion), one of the nine in Khanty-Mansi Autonomous Okrug of Tyumen Oblast, Russia. It is located in the northwest of the autonomous okrug on the left bank of meridional part of the Ob River within the limits of North Sosva altitudes and the east slope of the North and Pre-Polar Ural and borders with the Komi Republic in the west and with Shuryshkarsky District of Yamalo-Nenets Autonomous Okrug in the north. The area of the district is 90,000 square kilometers (35,000 sq mi). Its administrative center is the urban locality (an urban-type settlement) of Beryozovo. Population: 25,744 (2010 Census); 27,170 (2002 census); 28,256 (1989 Soviet census). The population of Beryozovo accounts for 28.3% of the district's total population.

== Geography ==
The district lies in the basins of the Lesser Ob and the Severnaya Sosva Rivers.

== Climate ==
The climate of the district is extremely cold, characterized by the way in which weather conditions are able to rapidly change. Average temperatures in January range from −18 to −24 °C (0 to −11 °F). Temperatures are below freezing for seven months of the year—from October to April. Snow lies on the ground for 180 to 200 days—again, from October to the start of May. The warmest month is July, when average temperatures reach +16 to +18 °C (61 to 64 °F). Annual precipitation is 400 to 550 millimeters (16 to 22 in) and the average wind speed is between 5 and 7 meters per second (16 and 23 ft/s).

== Demographics ==
The population is multiethnic, with prevalence of Russian, Ukrainian, and Tatar ethnicities. The district is a place of dense habitation of the Mansi people (est. 6,117 people). Indigenous (Khanty, Mansi, and Nenets) make up approximately 25% of the district's population.

Ethnic composition (2021):

- Russians – 58.9%
- Mansi – 17.2%
- Khanty – 6.9%
- Komi – 4.2%
- Tatars – 2.5%
- Ukrainians – 2.4%
- Nenets – 2.3%
- Others – 5.6%

== See also ==
- Beryozovsky Uyezd
