= Priobye =

Priobye Прио́бье
- Urban-type settlement
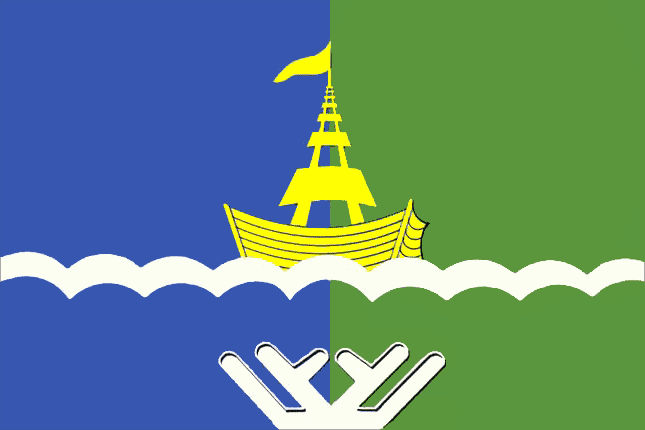
- Flag
- Interactive map of Priobye
- Location of Priobye Priobye (Khanty–Mansi Autonomous Okrug)
- Coordinates: 62°33′N 65°38′E
- Country: Russia
- Federal subject: Khanty-Mansi Autonomous Okrug
- Administrative district: Oktyabrsky District
- Founded: 1964

Population (2010 Census)
  - Total: 7,215
  - Estimate (2021): 7,550 (+4.6%)
- Time zone: UTC+5 (MSK+2)
- Postal code: 628126
- OKTMO ID: 71821156051

Priobye (Russian: Прио́бье) is an urban locality (an urban-type settlement) in Oktyabrsky District of Khanty-Mansi Autonomous Okrug, Russia. Population: 7,215 (2010 census); 7,140 (2002 census); 8,570 (1989 Soviet census).
