= Sovetsky, Khanty-Mansi Autonomous Okrug =

Sovetsky Советский
- Town
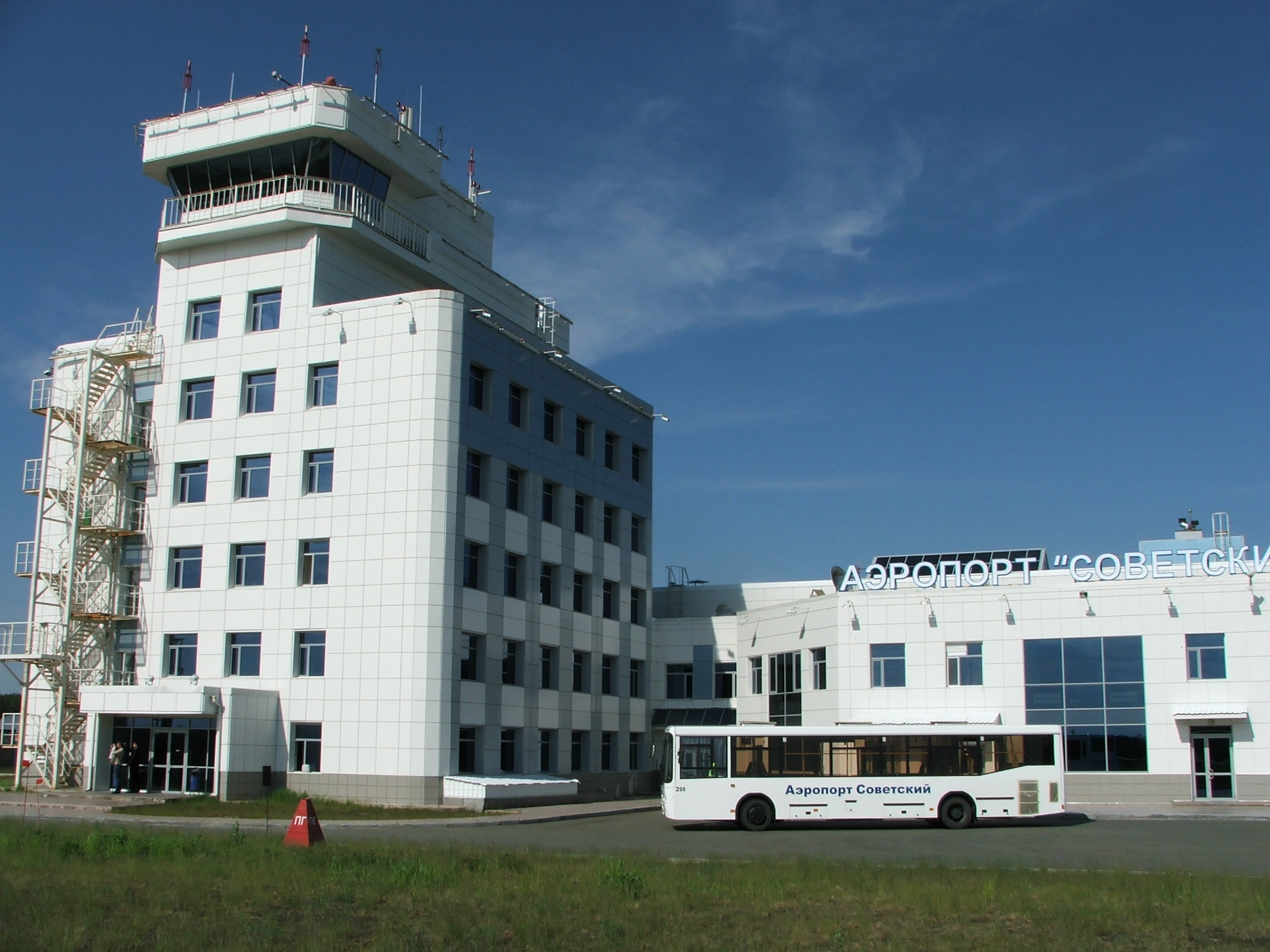
- Sovetsky Airport

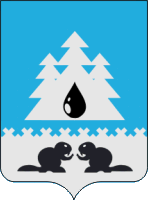
- Flag Coat of arms
- Interactive map of Sovetsky
- Location of Sovetsky Sovetsky (Khanty–Mansi Autonomous Okrug)
- Coordinates: 61°21′41″N 63°35′03″E
- Country: Russia
- Federal subject: Khanty-Mansi Autonomous Okrug
- Administrative district: Sovetsky District
- Founded: 1963
- Town status since: 1997
- Elevation: 112 m (367 ft)

Population (2010 Census)
  - Total: 26,495
  - Estimate (2021): 31,138 (+17.5%)

Administrative status
  - Capital of: Sovetsky District

Municipal status
  - Municipal district: Sovetsky Municipal District
  - Urban settlement: Sovetsky Urban Settlement
  - Capital of: Sovetsky Municipal District, Sovetsky Urban Settlement
- Time zone: UTC+5 (MSK+2)
- Postal codes: 628240–628242, 628244, 628249
- OKTMO ID: 71824104001
- Website: www.sovinet.ru

Sovetsky (Russian: Сове́тский) is a town and the administrative center of Sovetsky District in Khanty-Mansi Autonomous Okrug, Russia, located 470 kilometers (290 mi) west of Khanty-Mansiysk, the administrative center of the autonomous okrug. Population: 26,495 (2010 census); 23,230 (2002 census); 21,123 (1989 Soviet census).

== History ==
It was founded in 1963 and granted urban-type settlement status in 1963. Town status was granted to it in 1997.

== Administrative and municipal status ==
Within the framework of administrative divisions, Sovetsky serves as the administrative center of Sovetsky District, to which it is directly subordinated. As a municipal division, the town of Sovetsky is incorporated within Sovetsky Municipal District as Sovetsky Urban Settlement.

== Transportation ==
The town is served by the Sovetsky Airport.
