= Sergino, Astrakhan Oblast =

Sergino Сергино
- Selo
- Location within Astrakhan Oblast Location within Russia
- Coordinates: 46°04′N 47°36′E
- Country: Russia
- Region: Astrakhan Oblast
- District: Ikryaninsky District
- Time zone: UTC+4:00

Sergino (Russian: Сергино) is a rural locality (a selo) in Ikryaninsky Selsoviet, Ikryaninsky District, Astrakhan Oblast, Russia. The population was 167 as of 2010. There are 4 streets.

== Geography ==
Sergino is located 9 km west of Ikryanoye (the district's administrative centre) by road. Borkino is the nearest rural locality.
