= Mezhdurechensky, Khanty-Mansi Autonomous Okrug =

Mezhdurechensky Междуреченский
- Urban-type settlement
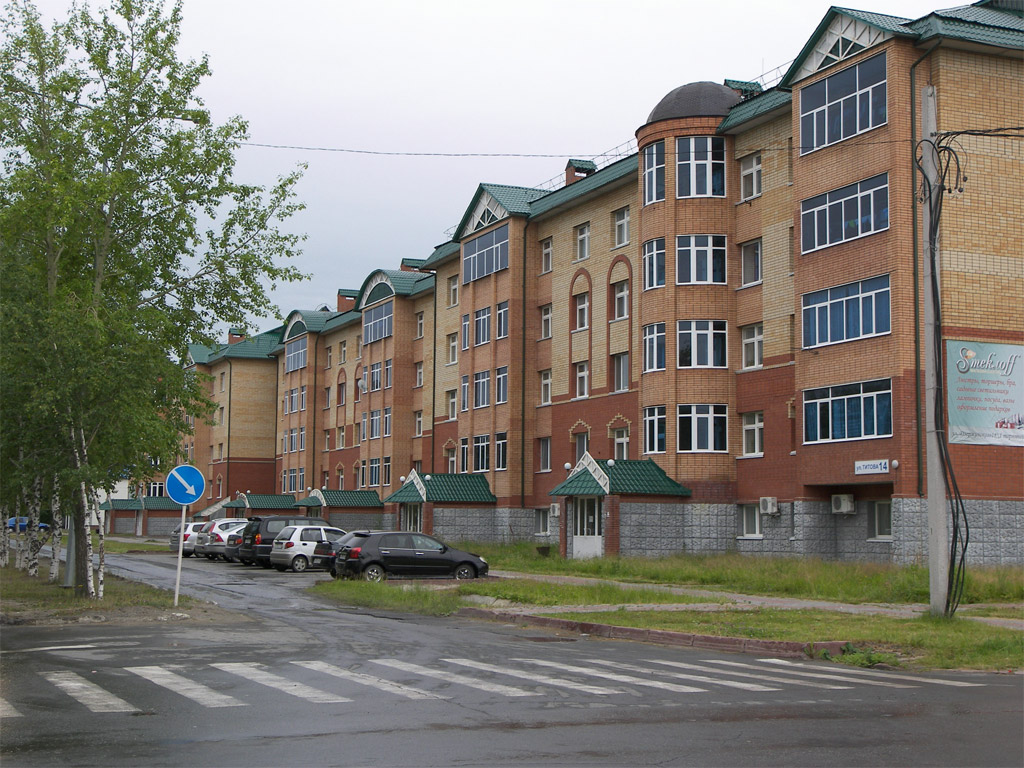
- The town centre of Mezhdurechensky
- Interactive map of Mezhdurechensky
- Location of Mezhdurechensky Mezhdurechensky (Khanty–Mansi Autonomous Okrug)
- Coordinates: 59.6000°N 65.9333°E
- Country: Russia
- Federal subject: Khanty-Mansi Autonomous Okrug
- Administrative district: Kondinsky District
- Founded: 1932

Population (2010 Census)
  - Total: 11,058
  - Estimate (2021): 11,067 (+0.1%)
- Time zone: UTC+5 (MSK+2)
- Postal code: 628200
- OKTMO ID: 71816160051

Mezhdurechensky (Russian: Междуре́ченский) is an urban locality (an urban-type settlement) and the administrative center of Kondinsky District of Khanty-Mansi Autonomous Okrug, Russia. Population: 11,058 (2010 census); 10,907 (2002 census); 8,657 (1989 Soviet census).
