= List of chairmen of the Duma of the Khanty-Mansi Autonomous Okrug =

The chairman of the Duma of the Khanty-Mani Autonomous Okrug is the presiding officer of that legislature.

== Office-holders ==
Name	Took office	Left office
Sergey Sobyanin	1994	2001
Vasily Sondykov	2001	2011
Boris Khokhryakov	2011	Present

== Sources ==
- The Duma of the Khanty-Mani Autonous Okrug
