= Oktyabrskoye, Khanty-Mansi Autonomous Okrug =

Oktyabrskoye Октя́брьское
- Urban-type settlement
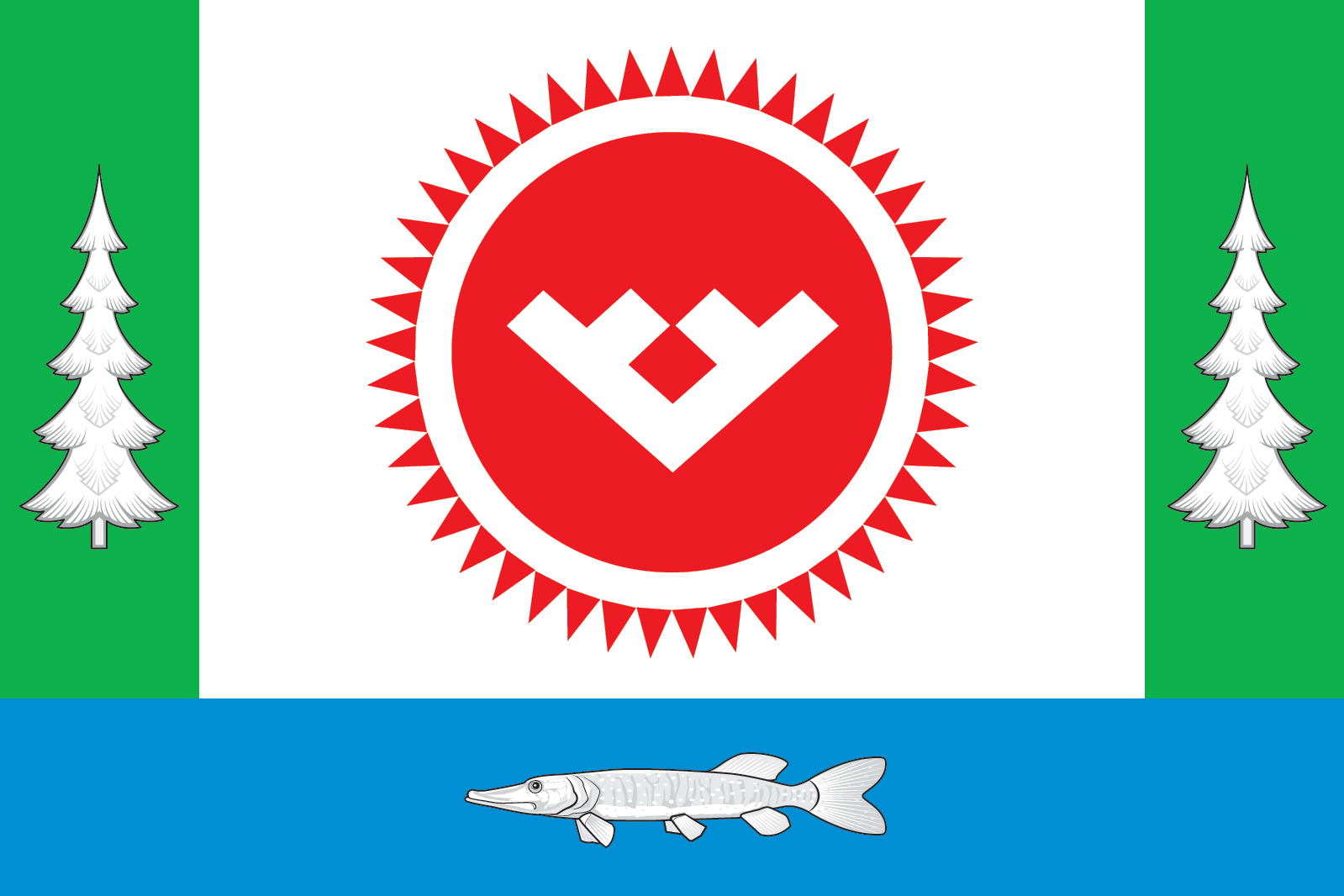
- Flag
- Interactive map of Oktyabrskoye
- Location of Oktyabrskoye Oktyabrskoye (Khanty–Mansi Autonomous Okrug)
- Coordinates: 62.4594°N 66.0461°E
- Country: Russia
- Federal subject: Khanty-Mansi Autonomous Okrug
- Administrative district: Oktyabrsky District
- Founded: 1590

Population (2010 Census)
  - Total: 3,640
  - Estimate (2021): 3,792 (+4.2%)
- Time zone: UTC+5 (MSK+2)
- Postal code: 628100
- OKTMO ID: 71821151051

Oktyabrskoye (Russian: Октя́брьское) is an urban locality (an urban-type settlement) and the administrative center of Oktyabrsky District of Khanty-Mansi Autonomous Okrug, Russia. Population: 3,640 (2010 census); 3,857 (2002 census); 3,781 (1989 Soviet census).

== Climate ==
Climate data for Oktyabrskoye (extremes 1904–present)
Month	Jan	Feb	Mar	Apr	May	Jun	Jul	Aug	Sep	Oct	Nov	Dec	Year
Record high °C (°F)	1.8 (35.2)	3.4 (38.1)	13.3 (55.9)	23.6 (74.5)	31.3 (88.3)	33.1 (91.6)	34.9 (94.8)	32.5 (90.5)	26.1 (79.0)	19.2 (66.6)	7.8 (46.0)	2.5 (36.5)	34.9 (94.8)
Mean daily maximum °C (°F)	−16.3 (2.7)	−13.3 (8.1)	−3.5 (25.7)	4.1 (39.4)	12.5 (54.5)	19.7 (67.5)	22.7 (72.9)	18.1 (64.6)	11.4 (52.5)	2.5 (36.5)	−8.2 (17.2)	−13.8 (7.2)	3.0 (37.4)
Daily mean °C (°F)	−19.9 (−3.8)	−17.3 (0.9)	−8.2 (17.2)	−1.0 (30.2)	6.8 (44.2)	14.1 (57.4)	17.4 (63.3)	13.4 (56.1)	7.2 (45.0)	−0.5 (31.1)	−11.4 (11.5)	−17.4 (0.7)	−1.4 (29.5)
Mean daily minimum °C (°F)	−23.6 (−10.5)	−21.0 (−5.8)	−12.4 (9.7)	−5.4 (22.3)	1.9 (35.4)	9.2 (48.6)	12.6 (54.7)	9.4 (48.9)	3.9 (39.0)	−3.2 (26.2)	−14.6 (5.7)	−21.2 (−6.2)	−5.4 (22.3)
Record low °C (°F)	−49.3 (−56.7)	−46.4 (−51.5)	−41.6 (−42.9)	−30.7 (−23.3)	−19.9 (−3.8)	−6.5 (20.3)	−0.5 (31.1)	−1.9 (28.6)	−8.3 (17.1)	−30.0 (−22.0)	−44.8 (−48.6)	−48.0 (−54.4)	−49.3 (−56.7)
Average precipitation mm (inches)	33.0 (1.30)	28.2 (1.11)	33.6 (1.32)	41.2 (1.62)	49.8 (1.96)	70.5 (2.78)	74.3 (2.93)	86.3 (3.40)	57.6 (2.27)	58.3 (2.30)	44.7 (1.76)	35.7 (1.41)	613.2 (24.16)
Source: pogoda.ru.net
