= Megion =

Megion Мегион
- town of okrug significance
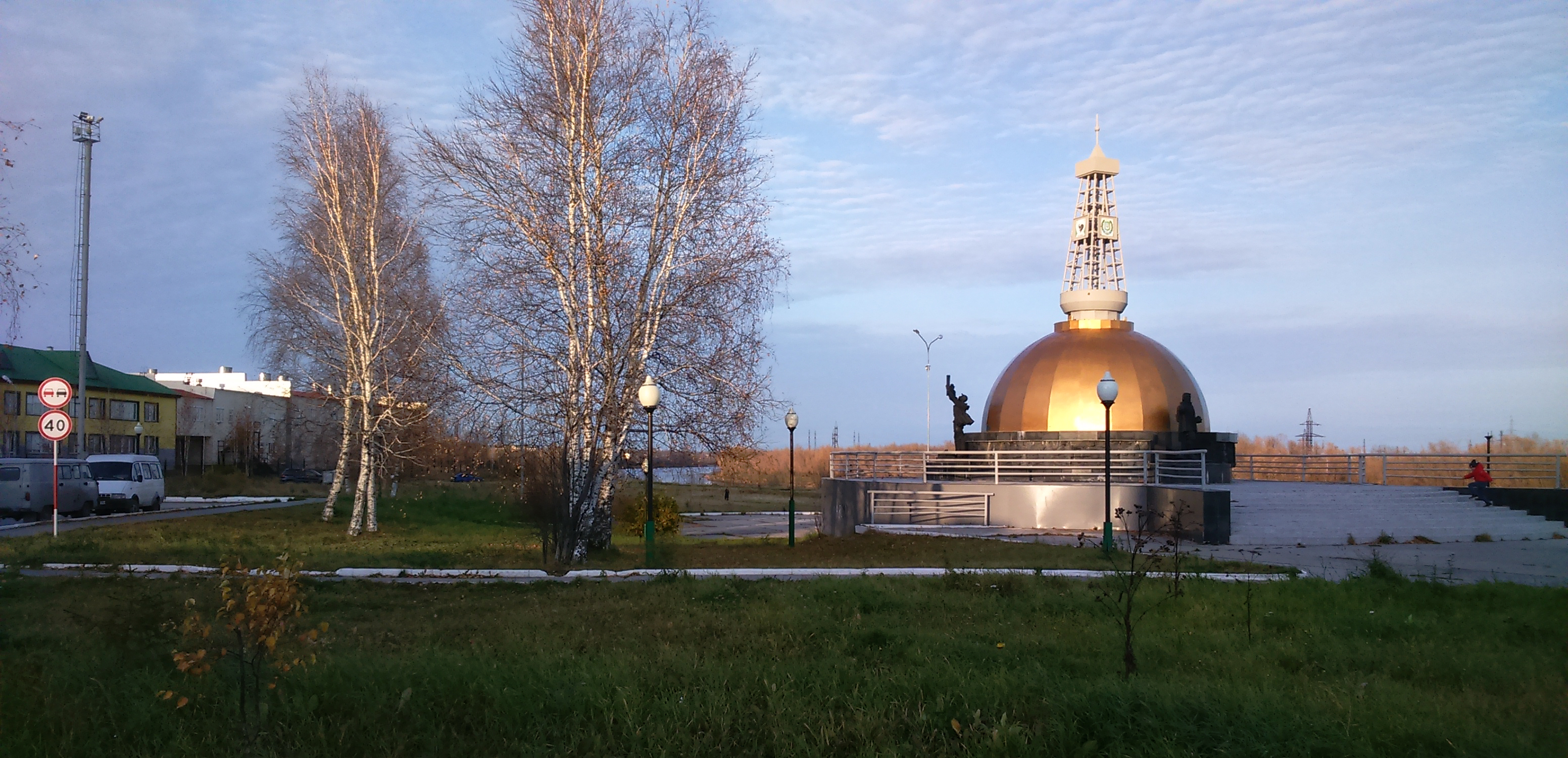
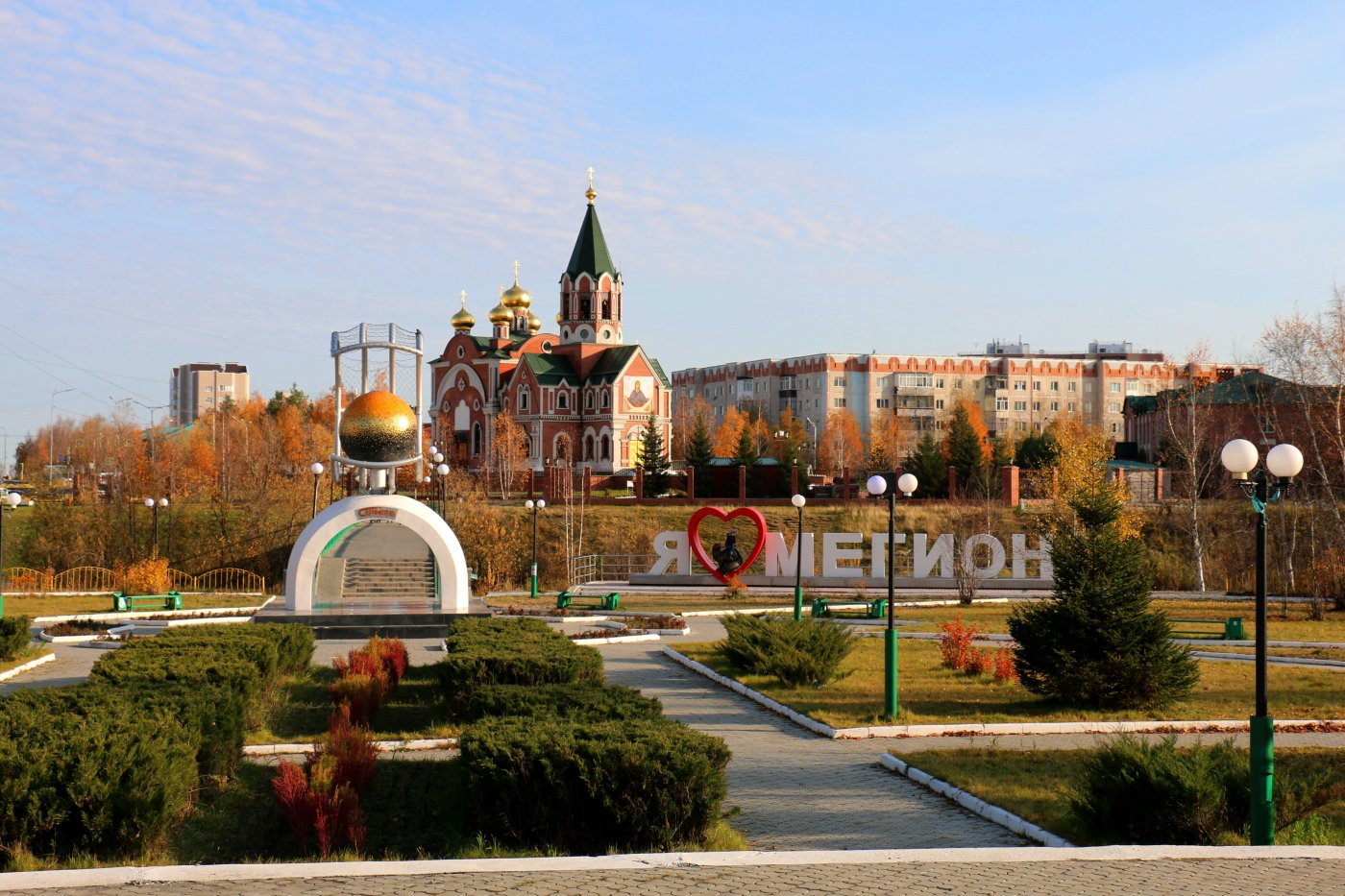
- Monument to Pioneers (up); Square near the Church of the Intercession of the Blessed Virgin

- Flag Coat of arms
- Interactive map of Megion
- Location of Megion Megion (Khanty–Mansi Autonomous Okrug)
- Coordinates: 61°01′59″N 76°06′35″E
- Country: Russia
- Federal subject: Khanty-Mansi Autonomous Okrug
- First mentioned: 1910
- Town status since: July 23, 1980

Government
  - Body: Duma
  - Head: Petrichenko Aleksey

Area
  - Total: 50.51 km^{2} (19.50 sq mi)
- Elevation: 40 m (130 ft)

Population (2010 Census)
  - Total: 49,449
  - Estimate (2021): 52,887 (+7%)
  - Density: 979.0/km^{2} (2,536/sq mi)

Municipal status
  - Urban okrug: Megion Urban Okrug
- Time zone: UTC+5 (MSK+2)
- Postal codes: 628680, 628681, 628684
- Dialing code: +7 34643
- OKTMO ID: 71873000001
- Town Day: July 23
- Website: www.admmegion.ru

Megion (Russian: Мегион) is a town in Khanty-Mansi Autonomous Okrug–Yugra, Russia, located at the altitude of 45 meters (148 ft) above sea level, on the right bank of the Ob River, 380 kilometers (240 mi) east of Khanty-Mansiysk and 760 kilometers (470 mi) northeast of Tyumen. The area of the town is 50.51 square kilometers (19.50 sq mi) and the nearest airport is in Nizhnevartovsk (30 kilometers (19 mi) away). Population: 49,449 (2010 census); 46,566 (2002 Census); 39,783 (1989 Soviet census).

Foundation and subsequent town development became possible with the discovery of oil in the Middle Ob Region. It was the Megion oil workers who drilled the first well in the Samotlor field, the largest oil field in the country, and initiated its industrial development. This laid the groundwork for the construction of Megion and Nizhnevartovsk, which together constitute one of the most significant centers of the Russian oil industry today.

== History ==
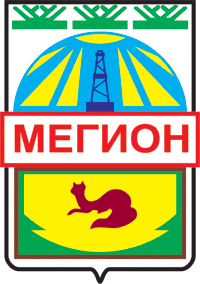
Coat of arms of Megion in the 1990s

It was first mentioned in 1810. In 1961, the first oil in Western Siberia was struck there. On September 29, 1964, Megion was granted urban-type settlement status. On July 23, 1980, it was elevated in status to that of a town. Now the town is a center of the oil and natural gas industries.

== Administrative and municipal status ==
Within the framework of administrative divisions, it is, together with one urban-type settlement, incorporated as the town of okrug significance of Megion—an administrative unit with the status equal to that of the districts. As a municipal division, the town of okrug significance of Megion is incorporated as Megion Urban Okrug.

== Gallery ==
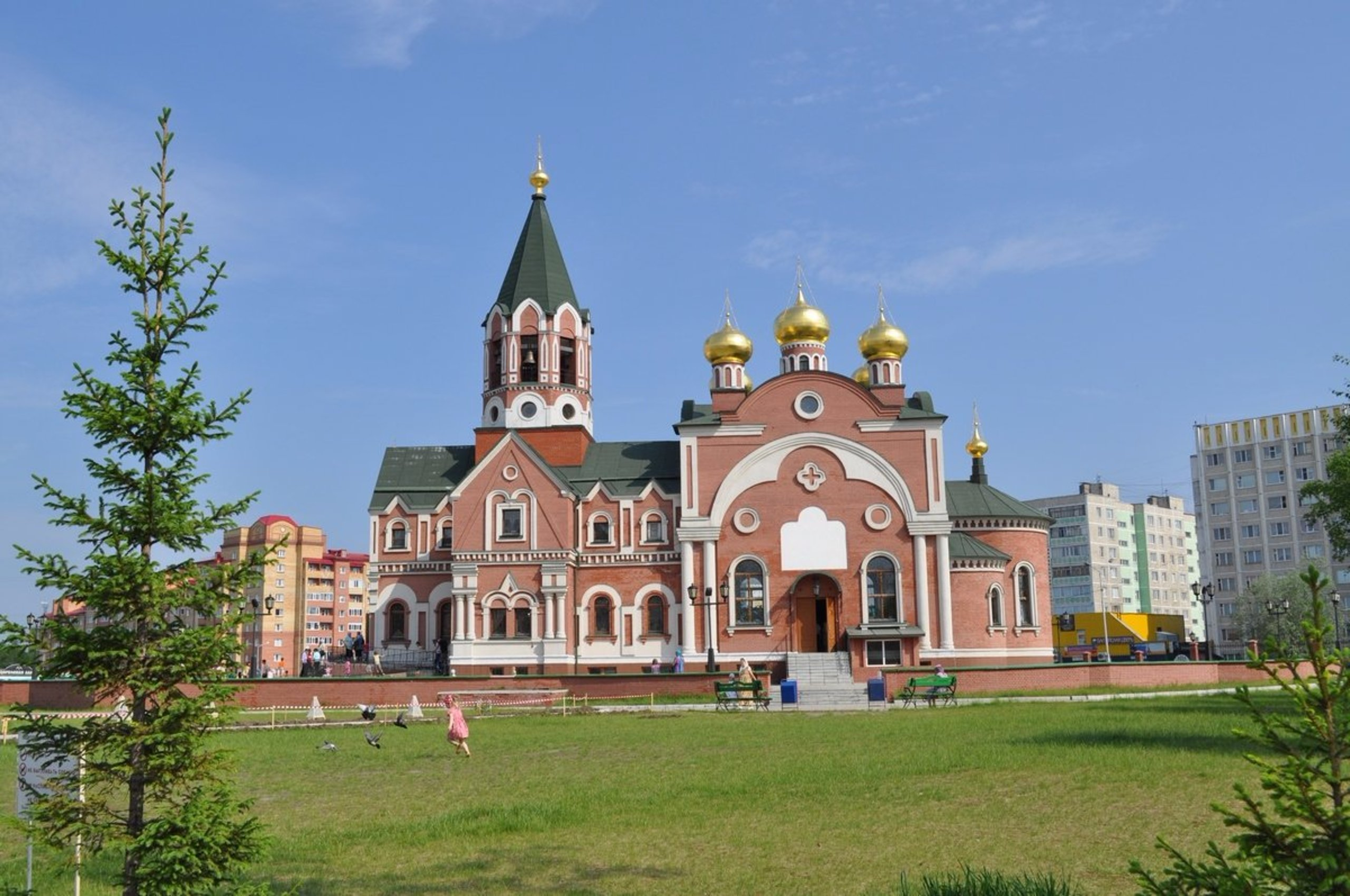
Church of the Intercession of the Blessed Virgin

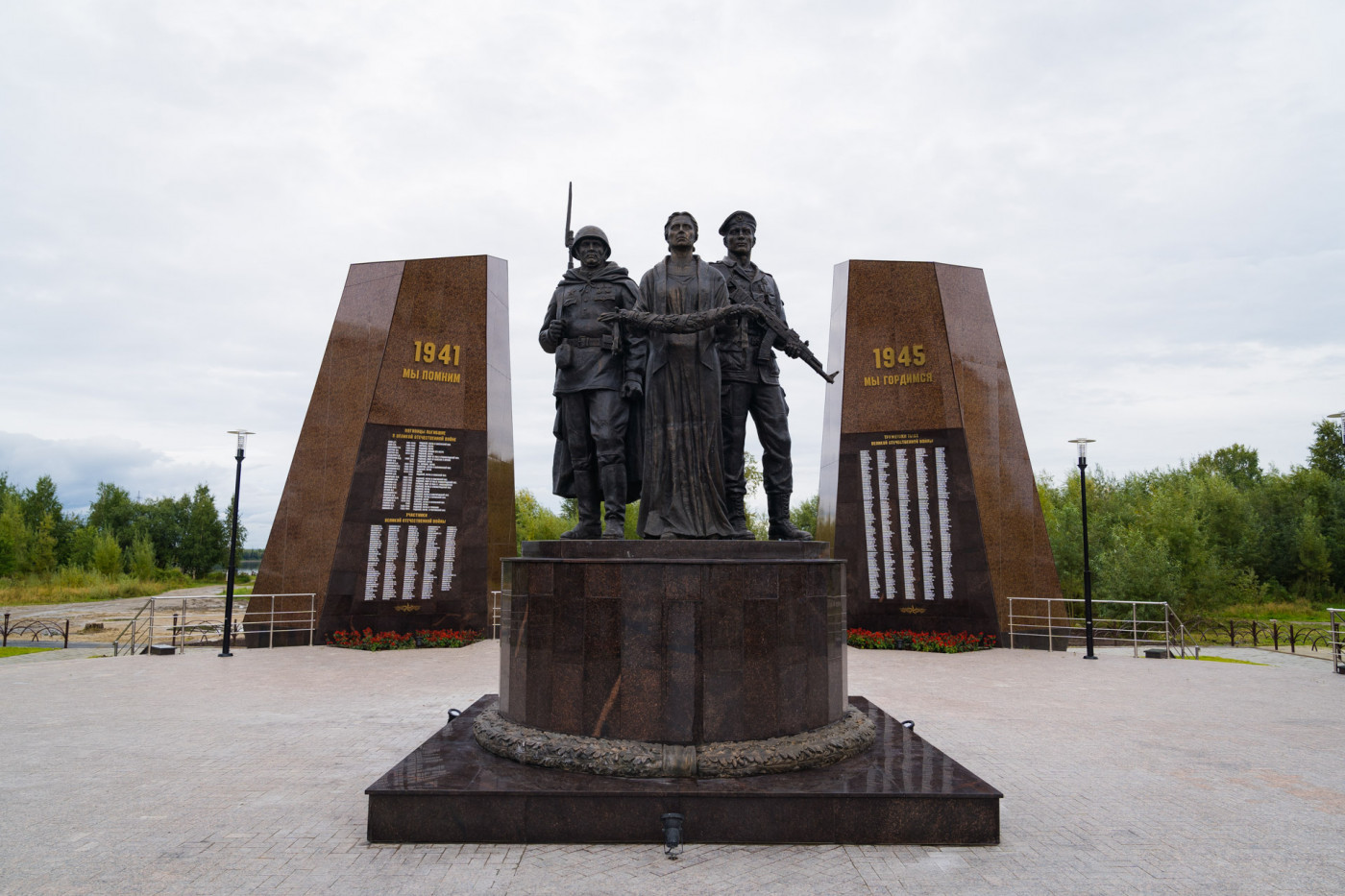
Alley of Honor to heroes of the passed conflicts

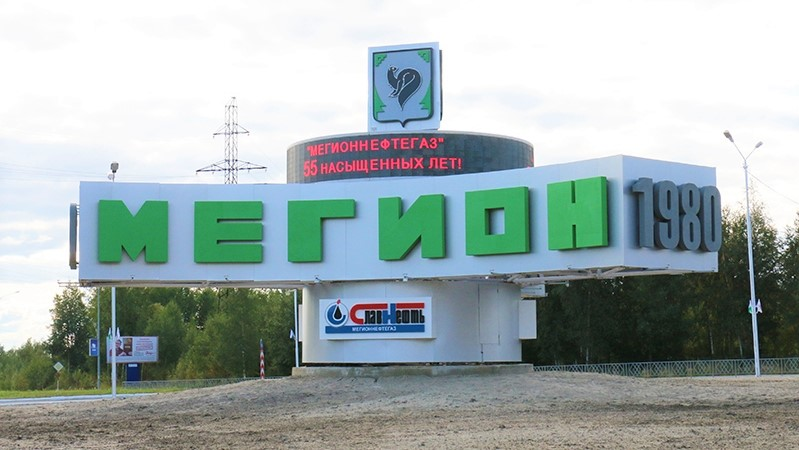
Welcoming sign at the entrance to the town

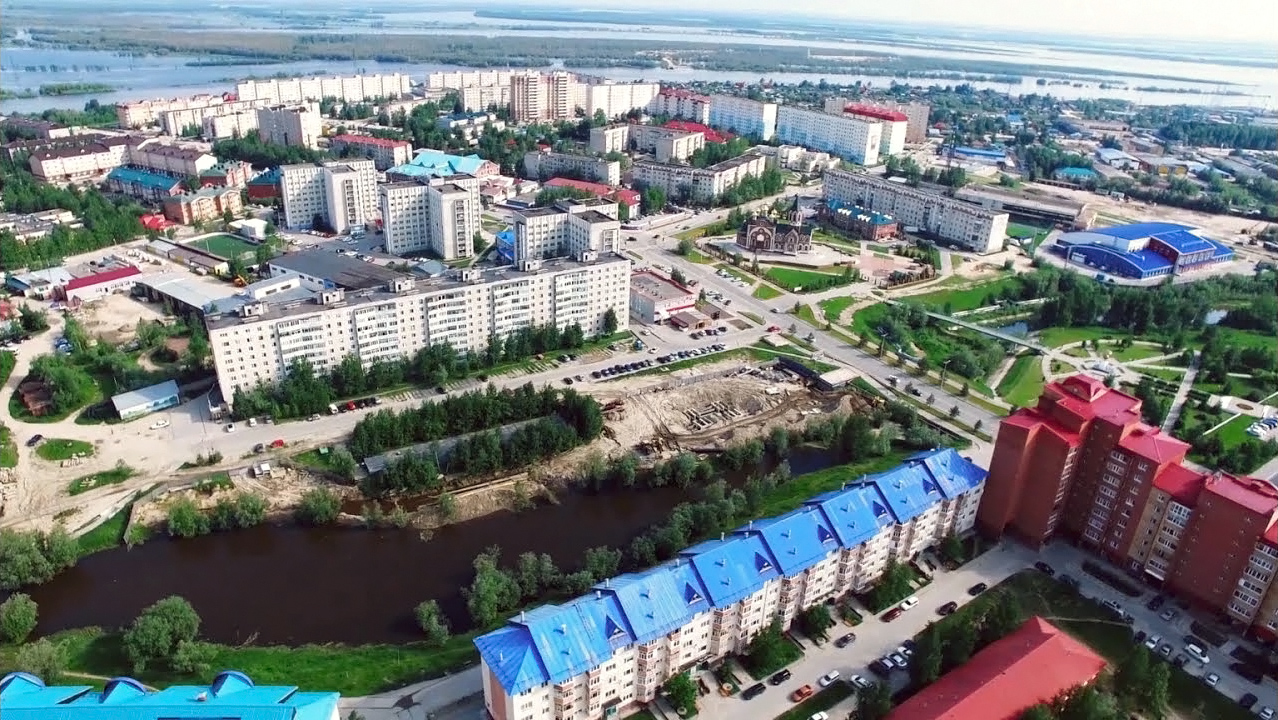
One of the neighbourhoods and Sayma river
