= Nizhnevartovsky District =

Nizhnevartovsky District Нижневартовский район (Russian)
- District
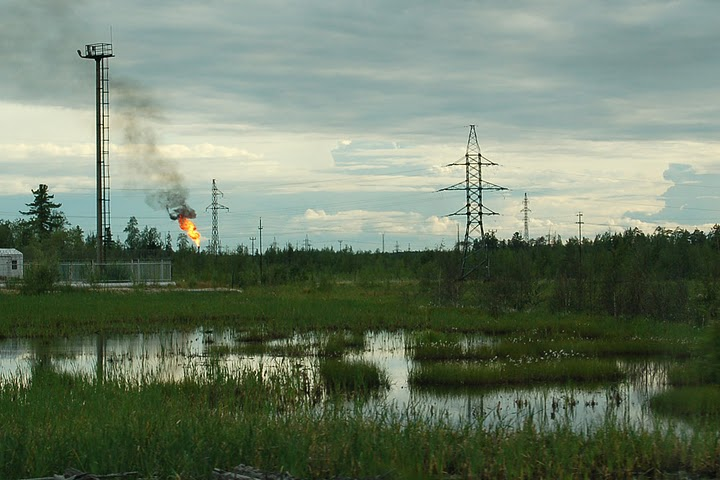
- Gas flare, Nizhnevartovsky District

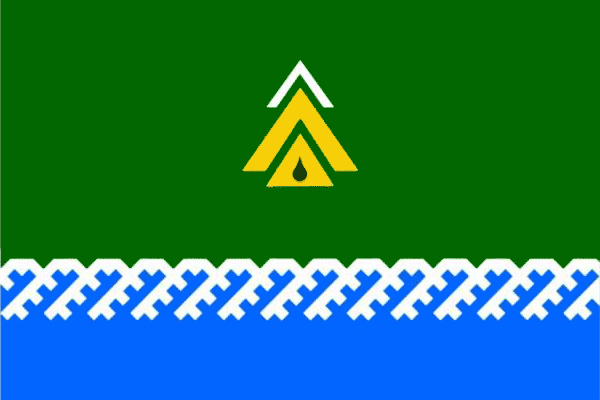
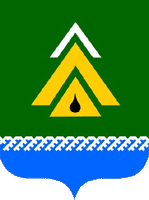
- Flag Coat of arms
- Location of Nizhnevartovsky District in Khanty-Mansi Autonomous Okrug
- Coordinates: 60°57′N 76°33′E
- Country: Russia
- Federal subject: Khanty-Mansi Autonomous Okrug
- Administrative center: Nizhnevartovsk

Area
  - Total: 118,500 km^{2} (45,800 sq mi)

Population (2010 Census)
  - Total: 35,745
  - Density: 0.3016/km^{2} (0.7813/sq mi)
  - Urban: 77.6%
  - Rural: 22.4%

Administrative structure
  - Inhabited localities: 2 urban-type settlements, 16 rural localities

Municipal structure
  - Municipally incorporated as: Nizhnevartovsky Municipal District
  - Municipal divisions: 2 urban settlements, 6 rural settlements
- Time zone: UTC+5 (MSK+2)
- OKTMO ID: 71819000
- Website: http://www.nvraion.ru/

Nizhnevartovsky District (Russian: Нижнева́ртовский райо́н) is an administrative and municipal district (raion), one of the nine in Khanty-Mansi Autonomous Okrug, Russia. The area of the district is 118,500 square kilometers (45,800 sq mi). Its administrative center is the city of Nizhnevartovsk (which is not administratively a part of the district). Population: 35,745 (2010 Census); 33,508 (2002 census); 28,288 (1989 Soviet census).

== Administrative and municipal status ==
Within the framework of administrative divisions, Nizhnevartovsky District is one of the nine in the autonomous okrug. The city of Nizhnevartovsk serves as its administrative center, despite being incorporated separately as a city of okrug significance—an administrative unit with the status equal to that of the districts.

As a municipal division, the district is incorporated as Nizhnevartovsky Municipal District. The city of okrug significance of Nizhnevartovsk is incorporated separately from the district as Nizhnevartovsk Urban Okrug.

== Geography ==
Lake Tormemtor is located in the district. The Ob and its tributary Vatinsky Yogan, as well as the Irtysh, are the main rivers.
