= Oktyabrsky District, Khanty-Mansi Autonomous Okrug =

Oktyabrsky District Октябрьский район (Russian)
- District
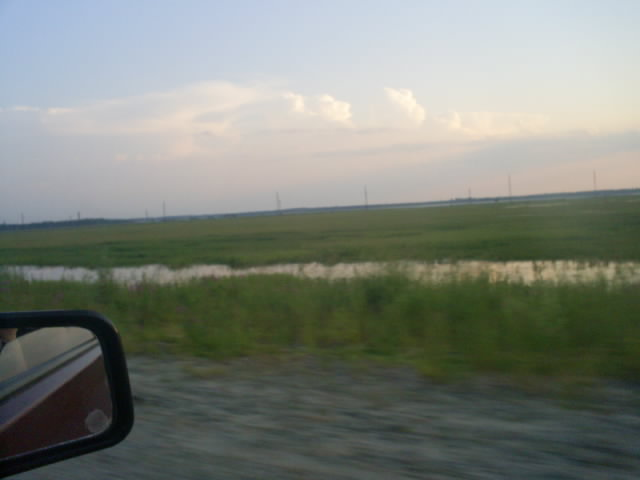
- Landscape in Oktyabrsky District

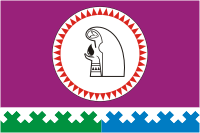
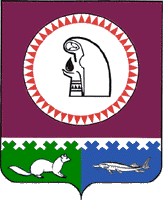
- Flag Coat of arms
- Location of Oktyabrsky District in Khanty–Mansi Autonomous Okrug
- Coordinates: 62°27′N 66°04′E
- Country: Russia
- Federal subject: Khanty–Mansi Autonomous Okrug
- Established: 1937
- Administrative center: Oktyabrskoye

Area
  - Total: 24,500 km^{2} (9,500 sq mi)

Population (2010 Census)
  - Total: 32,224
  - Estimate (January 2016): 29,302
  - Density: 1.32/km^{2} (3.41/sq mi)
  - Urban: 52.2%
  - Rural: 47.8%

Administrative structure
  - Inhabited localities: 4 urban-type settlements, 19 rural localities

Municipal structure
  - Municipally incorporated as: Oktyabrsky Municipal District
  - Municipal divisions: 4 urban settlements, 7 rural settlements
- Time zone: UTC+5 (MSK+2)
- OKTMO ID: 71821000
- Website: https://www.oktregion.ru

Population of Oktyabrsky District
- 2010 Census: 32,224
- 2002 Census: 29,283
- 1989 Census: 34,739
- 1979 Census: 27,182

Oktyabrsky District (Russian: Октя́брьский райо́н) is an administrative and municipal district (raion), one of the nine in Khanty-Mansi Autonomous Okrug of Tyumen Oblast, Russia. It is located in the western central part of the autonomous okrug. The area of the district is 24,500 square kilometers (9,500 sq mi). Its administrative center is the urban locality (an urban-type settlement) of Oktyabrskoye. As of the 2010 Census, the total population of the district was 32,224, with the population of Oktyabrskoye accounting for 11.3% of that number.

== History ==
The district was established as Mikoyanovsky District (Микояновский район) in 1937 within Ostyak–Vogul National Okrug of Omsk Oblast from parts of Beryozovsky and Kondinsky Districts. It was given its present name on November 28, 1957.
