= Surgutsky District =

Surgutsky District Сургутский район (Russian)
- District
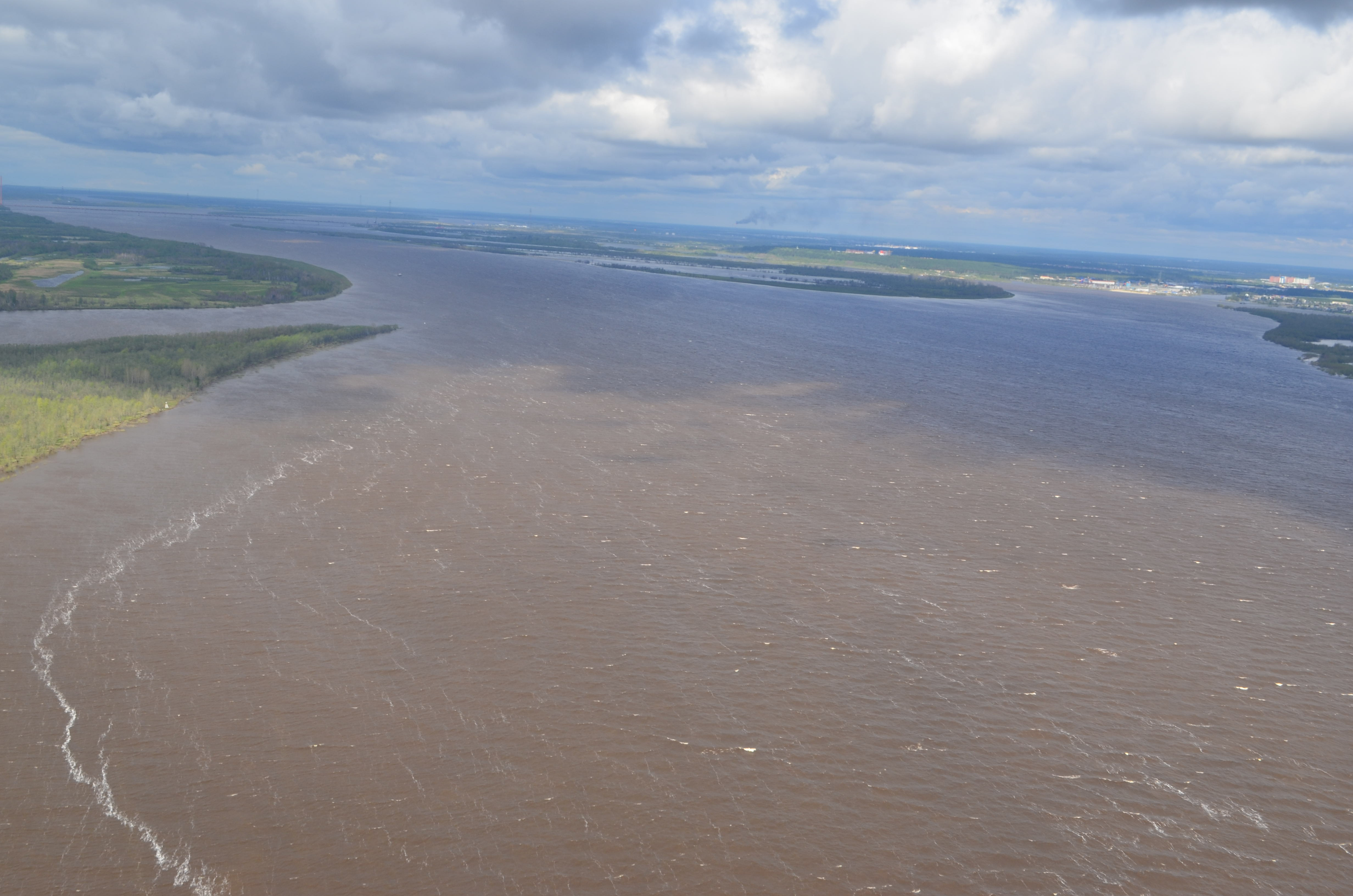
- Ob River, Surgutsky District

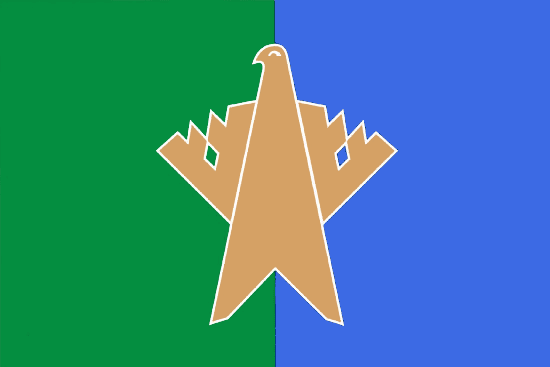
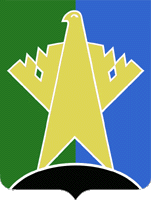
- Flag Coat of arms
- Location of Surgutsky District in Khanty-Mansi Autonomous Okrug
- Coordinates: 61°15′N 73°26′E
- Country: Russia
- Federal subject: Khanty-Mansi Autonomous Okrug
- Established: 1924
- Administrative center: Surgut

Area
  - Total: 105,190 km^{2} (40,610 sq mi)

Population (2010 Census)
  - Total: 113,515
  - Density: 1.0791/km^{2} (2.7950/sq mi)
  - Urban: 69.5%
  - Rural: 30.5%

Administrative structure
  - Inhabited localities: 1 cities/towns, 3 urban-type settlements, 19 rural localities

Municipal structure
  - Municipally incorporated as: Surgutsky Municipal District
  - Municipal divisions: 4 urban settlements, 9 rural settlements
- Time zone: UTC+5 (MSK+2)
- OKTMO ID: 71826000
- Website: http://www.admsr.ru/

Surgutsky District (Russian: Сургу́тский райо́н) is an administrative and municipal district (raion), one of the nine in Khanty-Mansi Autonomous Okrug, Russia. It is located in the center of the autonomous okrug. The area of the district is 105,190 square kilometers (40,610 sq mi). Its administrative center is the city of Surgut (which is not administratively a part of the district). Population: 113,515 (2010 Census); 106,624 (2002 census); 74,685 (1989 Soviet census).

== Administrative and municipal status ==
Within the framework of administrative divisions, Surgutsky District is one of the nine in the autonomous okrug. The city of Surgut serves as its administrative center, despite being incorporated separately as a city of okrug significance—an administrative unit with the status equal to that of the districts.

As a municipal division, the district is incorporated as Surgutsky Municipal District. The city of okrug significance of Surgut is incorporated separately from the district as Surgut Urban Okrug.

== Demographics ==
Ethnic composition (2021):

Ethnicity	Population	Percentage
Russians	61,348	56.4%
Tatars	7,467	6.9%
Bashkirs	4,545	4.2%
Ukrainians	4,253	3.9%
Nogais	4,007	3.7%
Tajiks	3,655	3.4%
Khanty	3,457	3.2%
Azerbaijanis	2,587	2.4%
Kumyks	2,518	2.3%
Lezgins	2,326	2.1%
Uzbeks	2,081	1.9%
Chechens	1,135	1.0%
Kyrgyz	1,056	1.0%
Others	8,393	7.7%
