= Kondinsky District =

Kondinsky District Кондинский район
- District

Other transcription(s)
  - Mansi: Хо̄нтаӈ район
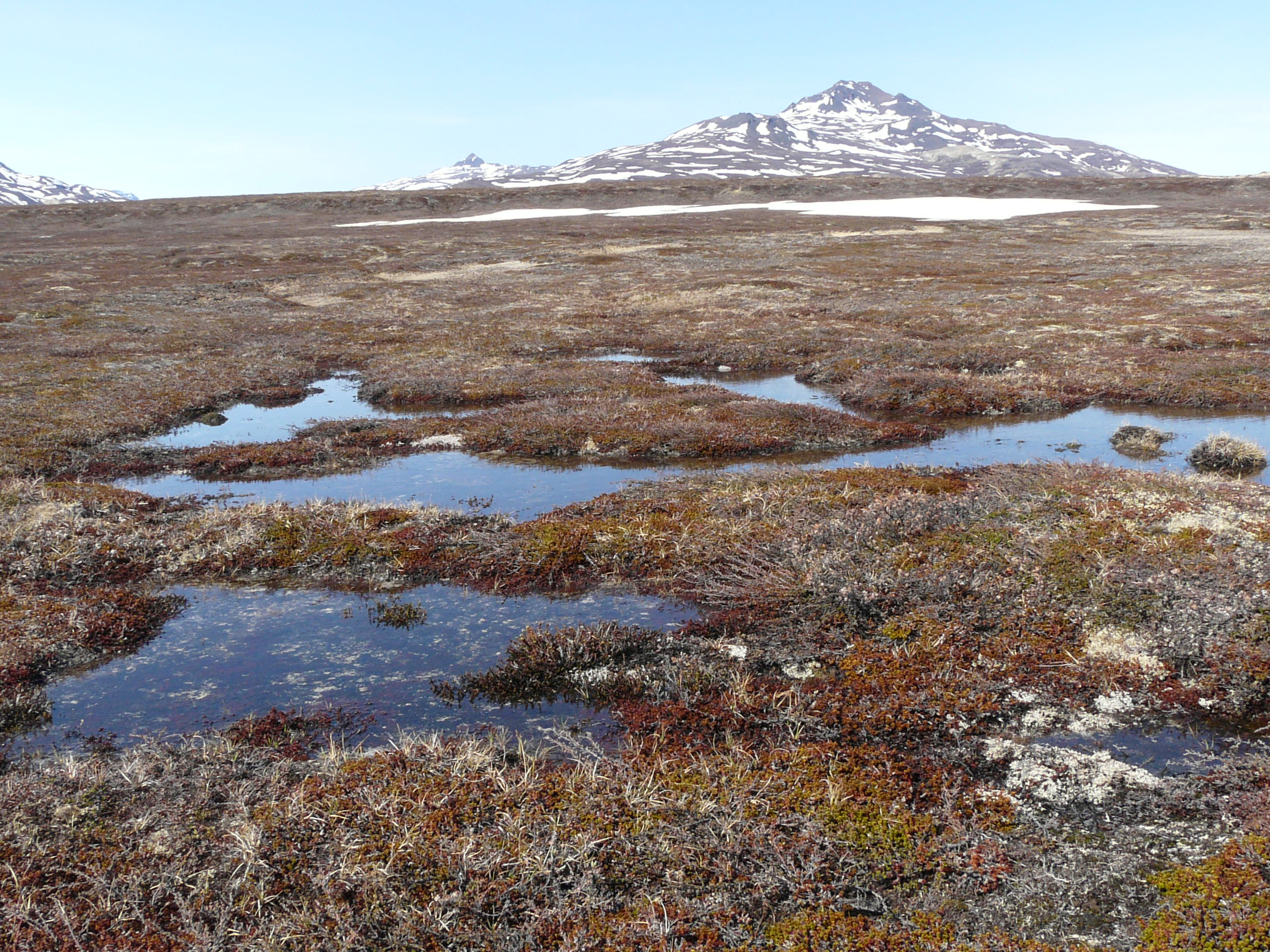

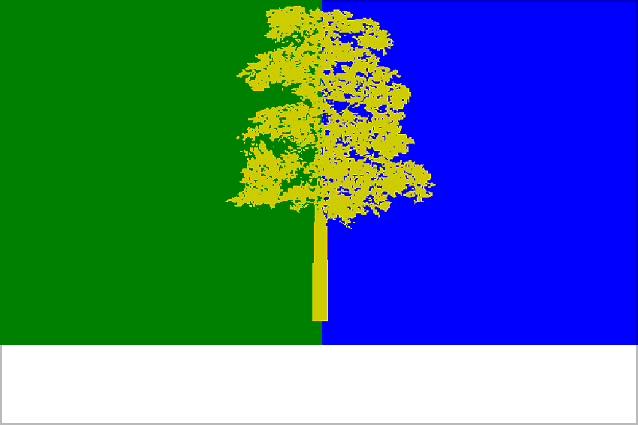
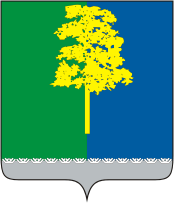
- Flag Coat of arms
- Location of Kondinsky District in Khanty–Mansi Autonomous Okrug
- Coordinates: 59°36′N 65°56′E
- Country: Russia
- Federal subject: Khanty–Mansi Autonomous Okrug
- Established: 1 February 1924
- Administrative center: Mezhdurechensky

Area
  - Total: 55,170 km^{2} (21,300 sq mi)

Population (2010 Census)
  - Total: 34,494
  - Density: 0.6252/km^{2} (1.619/sq mi)
  - Urban: 67.7%
  - Rural: 32.3%

Administrative structure
  - Inhabited localities: 5 urban-type settlements, 22 rural localities

Municipal structure
  - Municipally incorporated as: Kondinsky Municipal District
  - Municipal divisions: 5 urban settlements, 5 rural settlements
- Time zone: UTC+5 (MSK+2)
- OKTMO ID: 71816000
- Website: http://admkonda.ru/

Kondinsky District (Russian: Конди́нский райо́н) is an administrative and municipal district (raion), one of the nine in Khanty-Mansi Autonomous Okrug of Tyumen Oblast, Russia. It is located in the south of the autonomous okrug. The district is 55,170 square kilometers (21,300 sq mi). Its administrative center is the urban locality (an urban-type settlement) of Mezhdurechensky. Population: 34,494 (2010 Census); 35,018 (2002 Census); 36,640 (1989 Soviet census). The population of Mezhdurechensky accounts for 32.1% of the district's total population.
