= Sovetsky District, Khanty-Mansi Autonomous Okrug =

Sovetsky District Советский район (Russian)
- District
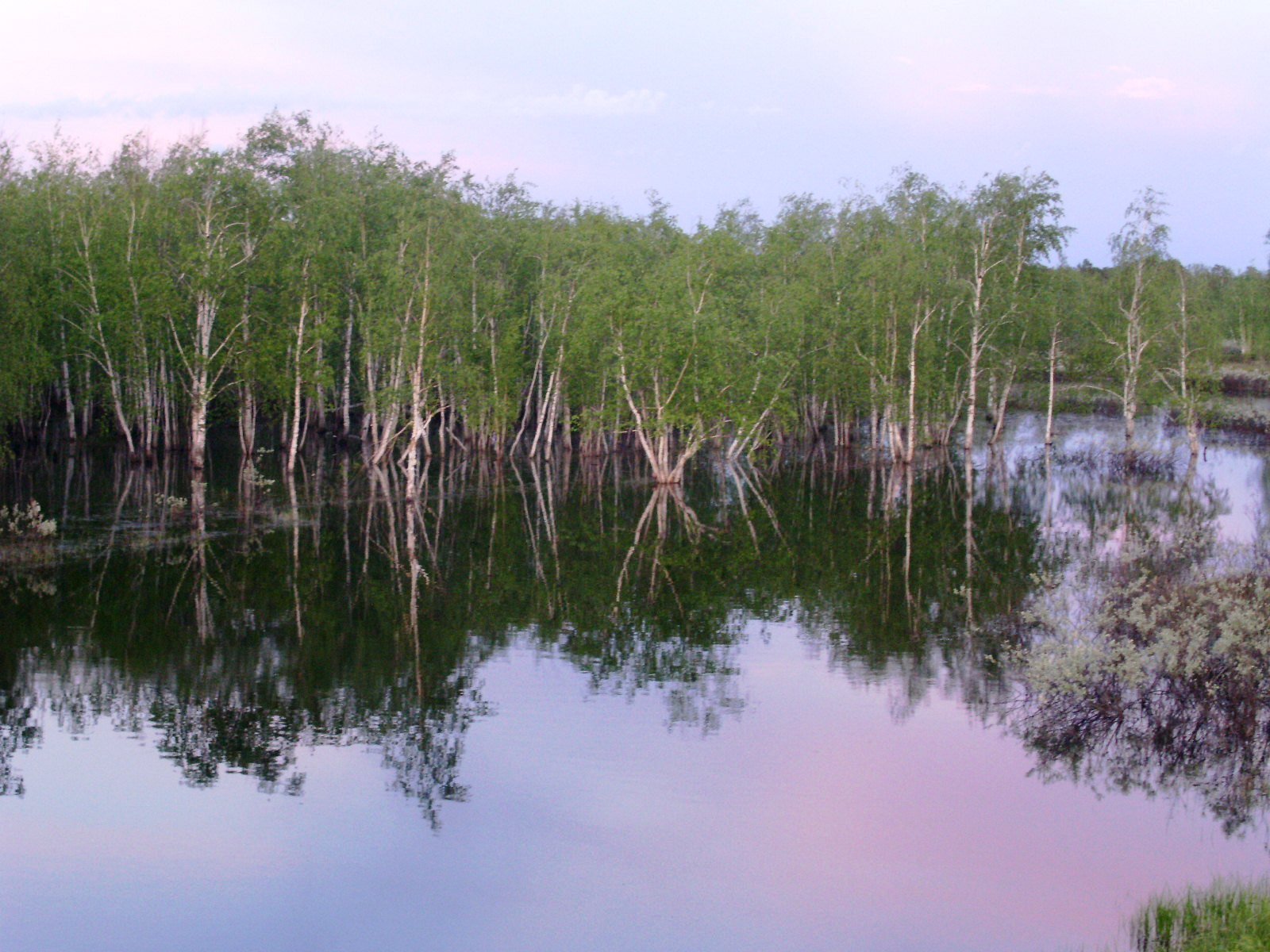
- Lake Kondinsky, Sovetsky District

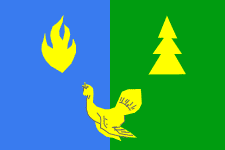
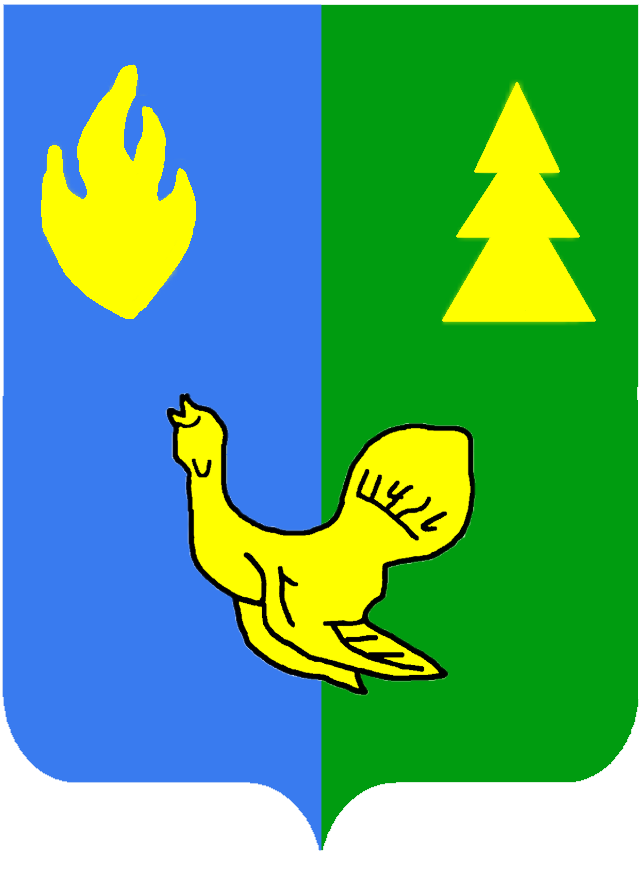
- Flag Coat of arms
- Location of Sovetsky District in Khanty–Mansi Autonomous Okrug
- Coordinates: 61°22′N 63°34′E
- Country: Russia
- Federal subject: Khanty–Mansi Autonomous Okrug
- Established: 1968
- Administrative center: Sovetsky

Area
  - Total: 29,768.74 km^{2} (11,493.77 sq mi)

Population (2010 Census)
  - Total: 48,059
  - Density: 1.6144/km^{2} (4.1813/sq mi)
  - Urban: 92.9%
  - Rural: 7.1%

Administrative structure
  - Inhabited localities: 1 cities/towns, 6 urban-type settlements, 2 rural localities

Municipal structure
  - Municipally incorporated as: Sovetsky Municipal District
  - Municipal divisions: 7 urban settlements, 1 rural settlements
- Time zone: UTC+5 (MSK+2)
- OKTMO ID: 71824000
- Website: https://admsov.com/

Sovetsky District (Russian: Сове́тский райо́н) is an administrative and municipal district (raion), one of the nine in Khanty-Mansi Autonomous Okrug of Tyumen Oblast, Russia. It is located in the southwest of the autonomous okrug. The area of the district is 29,768.74 square kilometers (11,493.77 sq mi). Its administrative center is the town of Sovetsky. Population: 48,059 (2010 Census); 44,720 (2002 census); 73,247 (1989 Soviet census). The population of the administrative center accounts for 55.1% of the district's total population.
