= Khanty-Mansi Autonomous Okrug =

First-level administrative division of Russia

Khanty-Mansi Autonomous Okrug–Yugra Ханты-Мансийский автономный округ — Югра (Russian)
- Autonomous okrug

Other transcription(s)
  - Khanty: Хӑнты-Мансийской автономной округ — Югра
  - Mansi: Ханты-Мансийский автономный округ — Югра
- Flag Coat of arms
- Anthem: Anthem of Khanty-Mansi Autonomous Okrug
- Coordinates: 62°15′N 70°10′E
- Country: Russia
- Federal district: Urals
- Economic region: West Siberian
- Established: December 10, 1930
- Administrative center: Khanty-Mansiysk

Government
  - Body: Duma
  - Governor: Ruslan Kukharuk

Area
  - Total: 534,801 km^{2} (206,488 sq mi)
  - Rank: 9th

Population (2021 census)
  - Total: 1,711,480
  - Rank: 27th
  - Density: 3.20022/km^{2} (8.28853/sq mi)
  - Urban: 92.0%
  - Rural: 8.0%

GDP (nominal, 2024)
  - Total: ₽8.63 trillion (US$101.25 billion)
  - Per capita: ₽4.95 million (US$58,029.15)
- Time zone: UTC+5 (MSK+2)
- ISO 3166 code: RU-KHM
- License plates: 86, 186
- OKTMO ID: 71800000
- Official languages: Russian
- Recognised languages: Khanty • Mansi
- Website: http://www.admhmao.ru/

Khanty-Mansi Autonomous Okrug–Yugra, (Note: Russian and Mansi: Ханты-Мансийский автономный округ — Югра, Khanty-Mansiyskiy avtonomnyy okrug — Yugra;, Khanty: Хӑнты-Мансийской автономной округ — Югра) also known as Khanty-Mansia (Khantia-Mansia), is a federal subject of Russia (an autonomous okrug of Tyumen Oblast). It has a population of 1,532,243 as of the 2010 Census. Its administrative center is Khanty-Mansiysk.

The peoples native to the region are the Khanty and the Mansi, known collectively as Ob-Ugric peoples, but today the two groups only constitute 2.5% of the region's population. The local languages, Khanty and Mansi, are part of the Ugric branch of the Finno-Ugric language family, and enjoy a special status in the autonomous okrug. Russian remains the only official language.

In 2012, the majority (51%) of the oil produced in Russia came from Khanty-Mansi Autonomous Okrug, giving the region great economic importance in Russia and the world. It borders Yamalo-Nenets Autonomous Okrug to the north, Komi Republic to the northwest, Sverdlovsk Oblast to the west, the core of Tyumen Oblast to the south, Tomsk Oblast to the south and southeast and Krasnoyarsk Krai in the east.

== History ==
The okrug was established on December 10, 1930, as Ostyak-Vogul National Okrug (Остя́ко-Вогу́льский национа́льный о́круг). In October 1940, it was renamed the Khanty-Mansi National Okrug. In 1977, along with other national okrugs of the Russian SFSR, it became an autonomous okrug (Khanty-Mansi Autonomous Okrug). In 2003, the word "Yugra" was appended to the official name.

== Geography ==
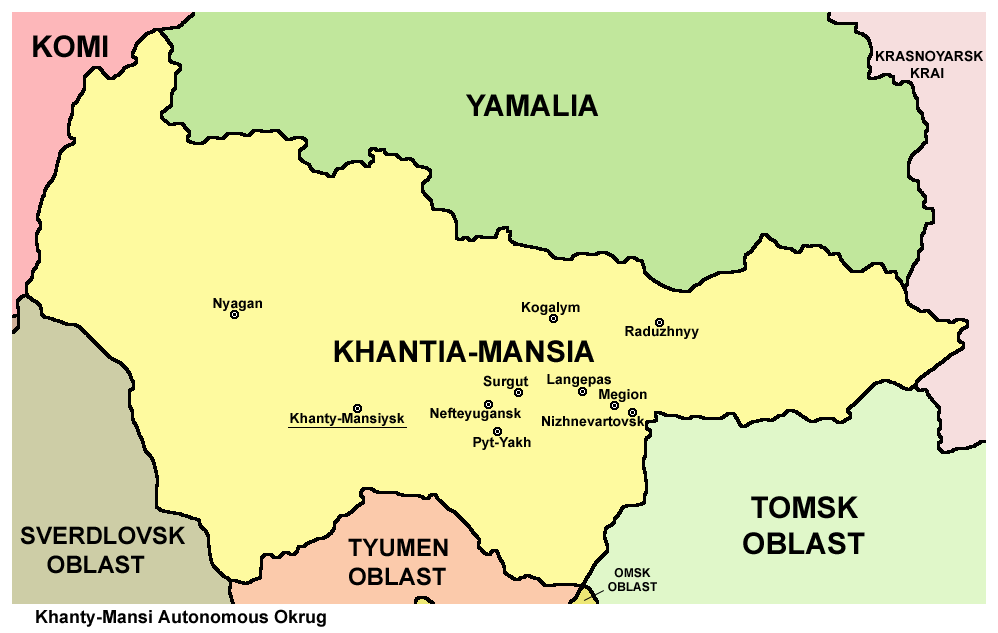
Map of Khantia-Mansia

The okrug occupies the central part of the West Siberian Plain.

Principal rivers include the Ob and its tributaries Irtysh and Vatinsky Yogan. There are numerous lakes in the okrug, the largest ones are Numto, Tormemtor, Leushinsky Tuman and Tursuntsky Tuman, among others.

The northeasterly line of equal latitude and longitude traverses the Khanty-Mansi Autonomous Okrug.

== Demographics ==
The population of the okrug in 2020 was 1,674,676. It has an area of 523,100 km^{2}, but the area is sparsely populated. The administrative center is Khanty-Mansiysk, but the largest cities are Surgut, Nizhnevartovsk, and Nefteyugansk.

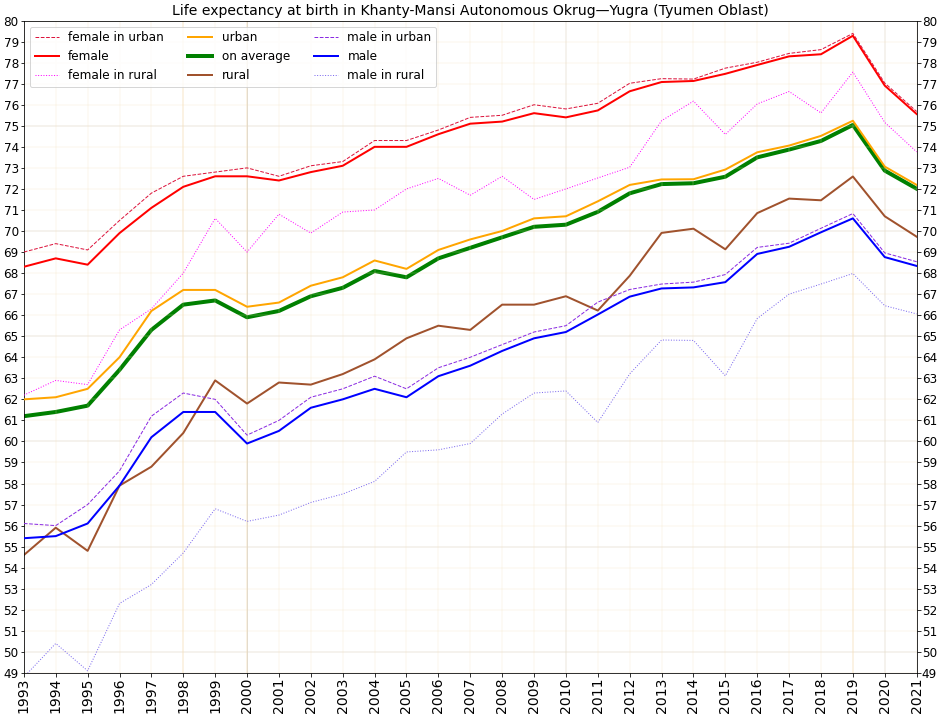
Life expectancy at birth in Khanty-Mansi Autonomous Okrug

	Average population (× 1000)	Live births	Deaths	Natural change	Crude birth rate (per 1000)	Crude death rate (per 1000)	Natural change (per 1000)	Fertility rates
1970	281	5 959	2 025	3 934	21.2	7.2	14.0	
1975	415	9 450	2 572	6 878	22.8	6.2	16.6	
1980	649	13 901	4 116	9 785	21.4	6.3	15.1	
1985	1 041	25 130	4 863	20 267	24.1	4.7	19.5	
1990	1 274	21 812	5 354	16 458	17.1	4.2	12.9	
1991	1 276	19 060	5 884	13 176	14.9	4.6	10.3	
1992	1 270	15 849	7 132	8 717	12.5	5.6	6.9	
1993	1 274	14 531	9 401	5 130	11.4	7.4	4.0	1.59
1994	1 286	15 120	9 937	5 183	11.8	7.7	4.0	1.59
1995	1 298	14 418	10 041	4 377	11.1	7.7	3.4	1.46
1996	1 310	14 469	9 508	4 961	11.0	7.3	3.8	1.39
1997	1 330	14 640	8 497	6 143	11.0	6.4	4.6	1.34
1998	1 351	15 600	8 164	7 436	11.5	6.0	5.5	1.39
1999	1 359	14 728	8 476	6 252	10.8	6.2	4.6	1.29
2000	1 372	15 579	9 426	6 153	11.4	6.9	4.5	1.34
2001	1 398	17 130	9 863	7 267	12.3	7.1	5.2	1.43
2002	1 426	19 051	9 829	9 222	13.4	6.9	6.5	1.54
2003	1 445	19 883	10 000	9 883	13.8	6.9	6.8	1.58
2004	1 456	20 377	9 828	10 549	14.0	6.8	7.2	1.59
2005	1 466	19 958	10 415	9 543	13.6	7.1	6.5	1.54
2006	1 476	20 366	10 077	10 289	13.8	6.8	7.0	1.56
2007	1 487	21 887	10 093	11 794	14.7	6.8	7.9	1.66
2008	1 500	23 197	10 215	12 982	15.5	6.8	8.7	1.74
2009	1 513	23 840	10 107	13 733	15.8	6.7	9.1	1.77
2010	1 527	25 089	10 447	14 642	16.4	6.8	9.6	1.84
2011	1 543	25 335	10 072	14 642	16.4	6.5	9.9	1.86
2012	1 558	27 686	9 949	17 737	17.6	6.3	11.3	2.02

=== Settlements ===
Largest cities or towns in Khanty-Mansi Autonomous Okrug 2010 Russian Census
Rank		Administrative Division	Pop.
1	Surgut	City of okrug significance of Surgut	380,632
2	Nizhnevartovsk	City of okrug significance of Nizhnevartovsk	277,668
3	Nefteyugansk	City of okrug significance of Nefteyugansk	127,255
4	Khanty-Mansiysk	Town of okrug significance of Khanty-Mansiysk	101,466
5	Kogalym	Town of okrug significance of Kogalym	67,727
6	Nyagan	Town of okrug significance of Nyagan	58,565
7	Megion	Town of okrug significance of Megion	46,643
8	Langepas	Town of okrug significance of Langepas	44,646
9	Raduzhny	Town of okrug significance of Raduzhny	43,666
10	Pyt-Yakh	Town of okrug significance of Pyt-Yakh	39,570

Historical population
Year	Pop.	±%
1939	92,932	—
1959	123,926	+33.4%
1970	271,157	+118.8%
1979	569,139	+109.9%
1989	1,268,439	+122.9%
2002	1,432,817	+13.0%
2010	1,532,243	+6.9%
2021	1,711,480	+11.7%
Source: Census data

=== Ethnic groups ===
The indigenous population (Khanty, Nenets, Mansi and Komi) summons to only 2.8% of the total population in the okrug. The exploitation of natural gas in the region has attracted immigrants from all over the former Soviet Union. The 2021 Census counted 17 ethnic groups of more than five thousand people each. The ethnic composition is as follows:

Population of Khanty-Mansi Autonomous Okrug:

Ethnic Group	Population	%
Russian	888,660	70.3%
Tatar	79,727	6.3%
Ukrainian	41,596	3.3%
Bashkir	29,717	2.4%
Tajik	21,791	1.7%
Azeri	21,259	1.7%
Khanty	19,568	1.5%
Lezgin	15,268	1.2%
Kumyk	13,669	1.1%
Uzbek	12,361	1.0%
Mansi	11,065	0.9%
Nogai	9,990	0.8%
Chuvash	7,786	0.6%
Chechen	7,085	0.6%
Belarusian	6,156	0.5%
Kyrgyz	5,562	0.4%
Moldovan	5,297	0.4%
Other	48,194	3.8%

Historical population figures are shown below:

Ethnic group	1939 Census		1959 Census		1970 Census		1979 Census		1989 Census		2002 Census		2010 Census^{1}		2021 Census	
Ethnic group	Number	%	Number	%	Number	%	Number	%	Number	%	Number	%	Number	%	Number	%
Khanty	12,238	13.1%	11,435	9.2%	12,222	4.5%	11,219	2.0%	11,892	0.9%	17,128	1.2%	19,068	1.3%	19,568	1.6%
Mansi	5,768	6.2%	5,644	4.6%	6,684	2.5%	6,156	1.1%	6,562	0.5%	9,894	0.7%	10,977	0.8%	11,065	0.9%
Nenets	852	0.9%	815	0.7%	940	0.3%	1,003	0.2%	1,144	0.1%	1,290	0.1%	1,438	0.1%	1,381	0.1%
Komi	2,436	2.6%	2,803	2.3%	3,150	1.2%	3,105	0.5%	3,000	0.2%	3,081	0.2%	2,364	0.2%	2,618	0.2%
Russians	67,616	72.5%	89,813	72.5%	208,500	76.9%	423,792	74.3%	850,297	66.3%	946,590	66.1%	973,978	68.1%	888,660	70.3%
Ukrainians	1,111	1.2%	4,363	3.5%	9,986	3.7%	45,484	8.0%	148,317	11.6%	123,238	8.6%	91,323	6.4%	41,596	3.3%
Tatars	2,227	2.4%	2,938	2.4%	14,046	5.2%	36,898	6.5%	97,689	7.6%	107,637	7.5%	108,899	7.6%	79,727	6.3%
Others	1,026	1.1%	6,115	4.9%	15,629	5.8%	43,106	7.6%	163,495	12.7%	223,959	15.6%	173,536	15.5%	219,465	17.3%
^{1} 102,138 people were registered from administrative databases, and could not declare an ethnicity. It is estimated that the proportion of ethnicities in this group is the same as that of the declared group.

=== Religion ===
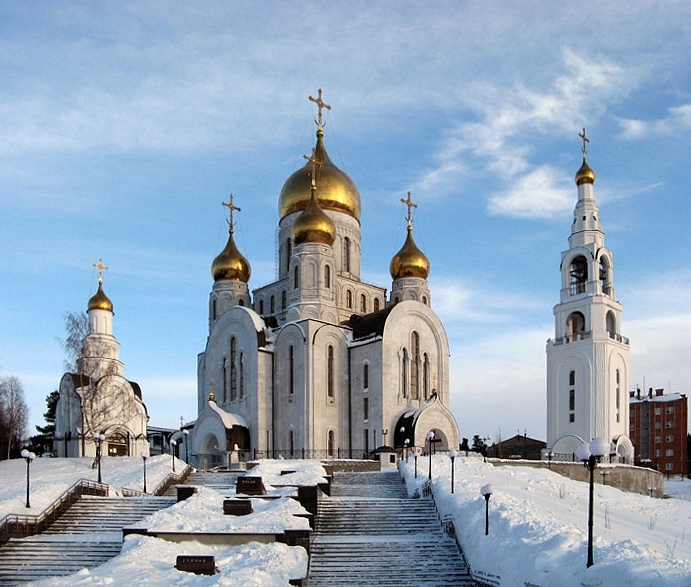
Orthodox Church of the Resurrection in Khanty-Mansiysk. Orthodox Christianity is the main religion in Khanty-Mansi Autonomous Okrug.

Religion in Khanty-Mansi Autonomous Okrug as of 2012 (Sreda Arena Atlas)
Russian Orthodoxy	38.1%
Other Christians	5.5%
Islam	11%
Rodnovery and other native faiths	0.9%
Spiritual but not religious	23.1%
Atheism and irreligion	11%
Other and undeclared	10.4%

According to a 2012 survey 38.1% of the population of Yugra adheres to the Russian Orthodox Church, 5% are unaffiliated generic Christians, 1% of the population adheres to the Slavic native faith (Rodnovery) or to Khanty-Mansi native faith. Muslims (mostly Tatars) constitute 11% of the population. In addition, 23% of the population declares to be spiritual but not religious, 11% is atheist, and 10.9% follows other religions or did not give an answer to the question. According to recent reports Jehovah's Witnesses have been subjected to torture and detention in Surgut.

== Transport ==
In Khanty-Mansi Autonomous Okrug, the primary transport of goods is by water and railway transport; 29% is transported by road, and 2% by aviation. The total length of railway tracks is 1,106 km. The length of roads is more than 18,000 km.

== See also ==
- Hockey Club Ugra
- List of Chairmen of the Duma of the Khanty-Mansi Autonomous Okrug
