= Ingushetia constituency =

Russian legislative constituency

Ingushetia single-member constituency
- Constituency of the Russian State Duma

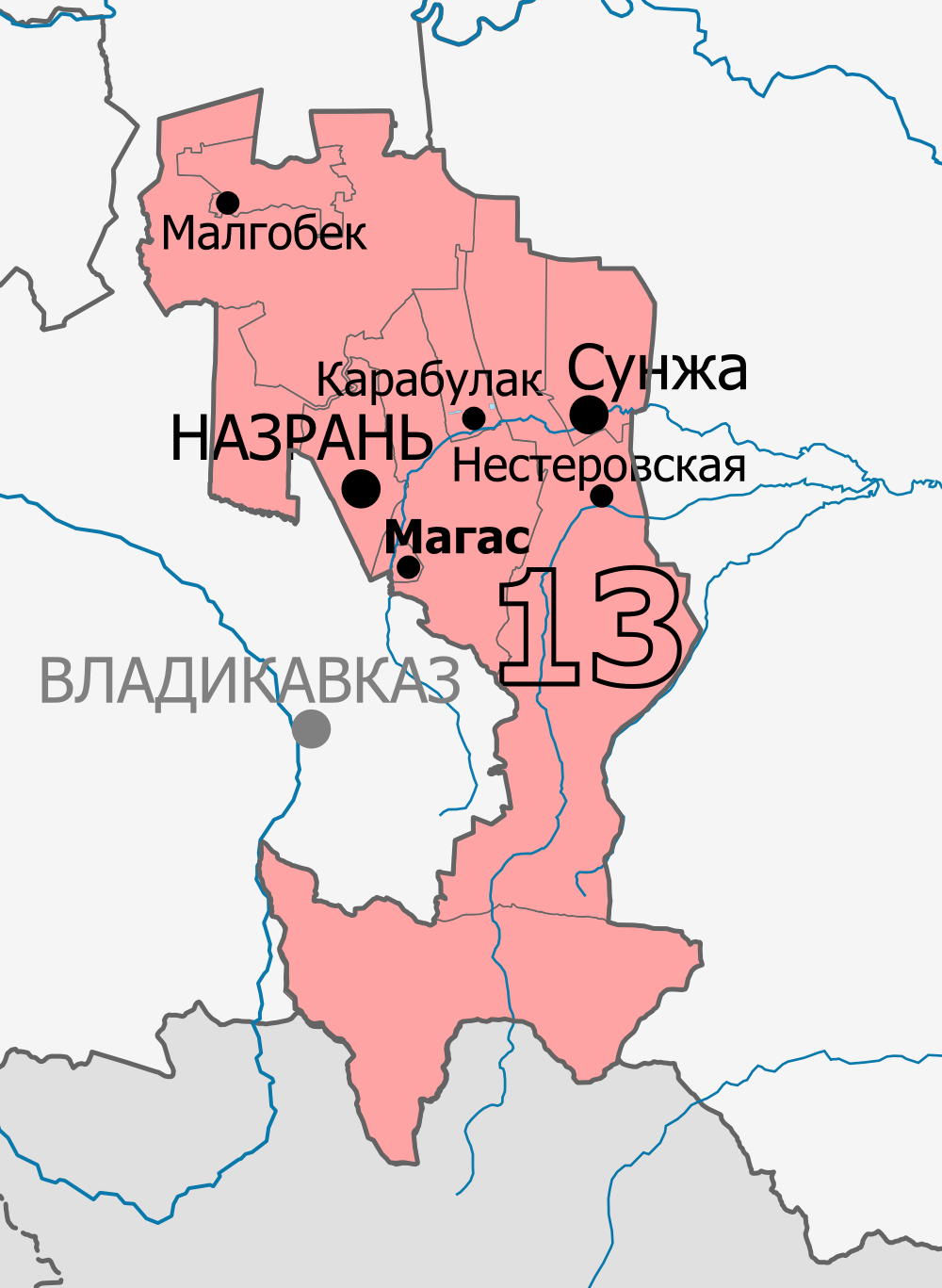
- Deputy: Muslim Tatriyev; United Russia
- Federal subject: Republic of Ingushetia
- Districts: Dzheyrakhsky, Karabulak, Magas, Malgobek, Malgobeksky, Nazran, Nazranovsky, Sunzha, Sunzhensky
- Voters: 259,513 (2026)

The Ingushetia constituency (No.16 (Note: No.12 in 1993-2003, No.13 in 2016–2026)) is a Russian legislative constituency in Ingushetia. The constituency encompasses the entire territory of Ingushetia.

The constituency has been represented since 2021 by United Russia deputy Muslim Tatriyev, a Rosneft executive, who won the open seat, succeeding one-term United Russia incumbent Alikhan Kharsiyev.

== Boundaries ==
1993–2007, 2016–present: Dzheyrakhsky District, Karabulak, Magas, Malgobek, Malgobeksky District, Nazran, Nazranovsky District, Sunzha, Sunzhensky District
The constituency has been covering the entirety of the Ingushetia since its initial creation in 1993.

== Members elected ==
Election	Member	Party
1993	Aleksandra Ochirova	Independent
1995	Mukharbek Aushev	Independent
1999	Mikhail Gutseriev (Note: elected president of Slavneft in January 2000)	Independent
2001	Alikhan Amirkhanov	Independent
2003	Bashir Kodzoev	Independent
2007	Proportional representation - no election by constituency	
2011	Proportional representation - no election by constituency	
2016	Alikhan Kharsiev	United Russia
2021	Muslim Tatriev	United Russia
2026	Muslim Tatriev	United Russia

== Election results ==
=== 1993 ===
==== Declared candidates ====
- Magomet-Bashir Abadiyev (Independent), Deputy Chairman of the Warriors-Internationalists Affairs Committee
- Boris Arsamakov (Independent), museum-preserve director
- Murad Bekov (Independent), former Member of Supreme Soviet of the Checheno-Ingush ASSR (1990–1991), businessman
- Bashir Chakhkiyev (Independent), Head of the State Archive of Ingushetia (1993–present)
- Lidia Dzeytova (Independent), Head of the Chechnya Department of Capital Investments and Construction
- Karim-Sultan Kokurkhayev (Independent), prosecutor
- Beslan Kotikov (Independent), construction businessman
- Aleksandra Momdzhyan (Independent), nonprofit president
- Timurlan Mutaliyev (Independent), former Minister of Education of Ingushetia (1993)
- Salman Naurbiyev (Independent), nonprofit chairman
- Magomed Oskanov (Independent), transportation executive
- Beksultan Seinaroyev (Independent), former Judge of the Grozny Leninsky City District Court (1989), law professor
- Magomed Sultygov (Independent), former Head of the Provisional Administration of Ingushetia (1992–1993)
- Maksharip Yandiev (Independent), community activist

==== Results ====
Summary of the 12 December 1993 Russian legislative election in the Ingushetia constituency
Candidate	Party	Votes	%
Aleksandra Momdzhyan	Independent	20,695	31.24%
Beksultan Seinaroyev	Independent	8,329	12.57%
Murad Bekov	Independent	8,249	12.45%
Timurlan Mutaliyev	Independent	7,324	11.06%
Magomet-Bashir Abadiyev	Independent	4,762	7.19%
Magomed Sultygov	Independent	3,636	5.49%
Karim-Sultan Kokurkhayev	Independent	2,811	4.24%
Bashir Chakhkiyev	Independent	1,899	2.87%
Lidia Dzeytova	Independent	1,770	2.67%
Salman Naurbiyev	Independent	1,565	2.36%
Boris Arsamakov	Independent	1,428	2.16%
Beslan Kotikov	Independent	1,123	1.70%
Maksharip Yandiev	Independent	182	0.27%
against all		727	1.10%
Total		66,239	100%

=== 1995 ===
==== Declared candidates ====
- Ruslan Aliev (Independent)
- Boris Arsamakov (Social Democrats), museum-preserve director, 1993 candidate for this seat
- Mukharbek Aushev (Independent), Lukoil vice president
- Magomet Bogatyrev (LDPR), Mayor of Ordzhonikidzevskaya
- Khadzhi Murat Ibragimbeyli (Nur), historian
- Mukharbek Khashiev (Independent)
- Aliskhan Khautiev (DPP), psychic
- Aslan Khidirov (Independent)
- Adam Malsagov (ELDP)
- Ismail Merzhoev (Independent), agriculture scientist
- Aleksandra Ochirova (BIR), incumbent Member of State Duma (1994–present)
- Magomet Ugurchiyev (NDR)
- Maksharip Yandiev (FDD), aide to State Duma member, 1993 candidate for this seat
- Yury Yeresko (Zemsky Sobor)
- Vakha Yevloev (Independent), former Minister of Foreign Economic Relations of Ingushetia (1992–1994)

==== Results ====
Summary of the 17 December 1995 Russian legislative election in the Ingushetia constituency
Candidate	Party	Votes	%
Mukharbek Aushev	Independent	42,095	65.24%
Vakha Yevloyev	Independent	10,680	16.55%
Ismail Merzhoev	Independent	2,944	4.56%
Aleksandra Ochirova (incumbent)	Ivan Rybkin Bloc	2,532	3.92%
Khadzhi Murat Ibragimbeyli	Nur	1,173	1.82%
Mukharbek Khashiev	Independent	848	1.31%
Magomet Bogatyrev	Liberal Democratic Party	644	1.00%
Aslan Khidirov	Independent	558	0.86%
Boris Arsamakov	Social Democrats	396	0.61%
Yury Yeresko	Zemsky Sobor	276	0.43%
Ruslan Aliev	Independent	224	0.35%
Magomet Ugurchiyev	Our Home – Russia	218	0.34%
Adam Malsagov	European Liberal Democratic Party	154	0.24%
Aliskhan Khautiev	Cause of Peter the First	105	0.16%
Maksharip Yandiev	Federal Democratic Movement	68	0.11%
against all		560	0.87%
Total		64,527	100%

=== 1999 ===
==== Declared candidates ====
- Mikhail Gutseriyev (Independent), Deputy Chairman of the State Duma (1996–present)
- Temur Kodzoyev (Independent), businessman, brother of Bashir Kodzoyev
- Askhab Myakiyev (Independent), former First Secretary of the CPSU Nazranovsky District Committee (1979–1990), writer
- Musa Ozdoyev (Independent), aide to State Duma member
- Akhmet Tsurov (Independent), former construction executive
- Zakre Yevloyev (Independent), economist

==== Withdrawn candidates ====
- Alikhan Amirkhanov (OVR), special economic zone head
- Magomet Batazhayev (DN)
- Bashir Daurbekov (Independent), attorney
- Alikhan Guliyev (Independent), journalist

==== Failed to qualify ====
- Mukharbek Aushev (Independent), incumbent Member of State Duma (1996–present), 1998 presidential candidate
- Isa Muzhekhoyev (Independent)
- Visangirey Nikerkhoyev (NDR), chairman of the party regional office
- Badrudin Pugoyev (Independent), attorney
- Lyalya Tsoroyeva (Independent), community activist

==== Did not file ====
- Ibragim Albakov (Independent)
- Beslan Tumgoyev (Independent)
- Vakha Yevloyev (Independent), former Minister of Foreign Economic Relations of Ingushetia (1992–1994), 1995 candidate for this seat

==== Results ====
Summary of the 19 December 1999 Russian legislative election in the Ingushetia constituency
Candidate	Party	Votes	%
Mikhail Gutseriyev	Independent	34,555	51.31%
Zakre Yevloyev	Independent	13,297	19.75%
Temur Kodzoyev	Independent	12,276	18.23%
Musa Ozdoyev	Independent	2,317	3.44%
Askhab Myakiyev	Independent	1,519	2.26%
Akhmet Tsurov	Independent	1,082	1.61%
against all		952	1.41%
Total		67,339	100%

=== 2000 ===
The by-election on 2 July 2000 could not be held because the polling stations were not opened after the race frontrunner Alikhan Amirkhanov was disqualified by the Republican Supreme Court the day earlier.

=== 2001 ===
==== Declared candidates ====
- Alikhan Amirkhanov (Independent), Deputy Premier of Ingushetia (2000–present), 1999 candidate for this seat
- Yakub Belkhoroyev (Independent), agriculture executive
- Alikhan Guliyev (Independent), journalist, 1999 candidate for this seat
- Temur Kodzoyev (Independent), businessman, brother of State Duma member Bashir Kodzoyev, 1999 candidate for this seat
- Musa Ozdoyev (Independent), former aide to State Duma member, 1999 candidate for this seat
- Osman Yevloyev (Independent), entrepreneurship consultant
- Vakha Yevloyev (Independent), former Minister of Foreign Economic Relations of Ingushetia (1992–1994), 1995 and 1999 candidate for this seat
- Zakre Yevloyev (Independent), economist, 1999 candidate for this seat

==== Withdrawn candidates ====
- Ruslan Maskurov (Independent)

==== Failed to qualify ====
- Alikhan Amerkhanov (Independent)
- Bashir Amerkhanov (Independent)
- Ruslan Amerkhanov (Independent)
- Musa Guliyev (Independent), director of the North Caucasus State Technological University, Nazran branch (2000–present)
- Kureysh Mutsolgov (Independent)

==== Results ====
Summary of the 15 April 2001 by-election in the Ingushetia constituency
Candidate	Party	Votes	%
Alikhan Amirkhanov	Independent	20,517	34.56%
Yakub Belkhoroyev	Independent	15,516	26.13%
Temur Kodzoyev	Independent	10,858	18.29%
Vakha Yevloyev	Independent	5,845	9.84%
Musa Ozdoyev	Independent	2,460	4.14%
Zakre Yevloyev	Independent	1,796	3.02%
Osman Yevloyev	Independent	263	0.44%
Alikhan Guliyev	Independent	256	0.43%
against all		447	0.75%
Total		57,958	100%

=== 2003 ===
==== Declared candidates ====
- Idris Abadiyev (Independent), Member of People's Assembly of the Republic of Ingushetia (1998–present)
- Magomed Batayev (VR–ES), First Deputy Minister of Youth Policy, Sport, and Tourism of Ingushetia
- Musa Darsigov (Independent), former People's Deputy of the Soviet Union (1989–1991)
- Magomed Gaparkhoyev (Independent), unemployed
- Musa Guliyev (SDPR), director of the North Caucasus State Technological University, Nazran branch (2000–present), 2001 candidate for this seat
- Khavazh Khashiyev (Independent), unemployed
- Bashir Kodzoyev (Independent), Member of State Duma (2000–present)
- Zaurbek Malsagov (Yabloko), mathematics senior lecturer
- Musa Ozdoyev (NPRF), aide to President of Ingushetia Murat Zyazikov, 1999 and 2001 candidate for this seat
- Alikhan Parov (Independent), former Deputy Premier of Ingushetia
- Khizir Tsechoyev (Independent), unemployed
- Magomed-Sharip Tsechoyev (Rodina), attorney

==== Withdrawn candidates ====
- Mukharbek Aushev (United Russia), former Member of State Duma (1996–1999), 1998 and 2002 presidential candidate (ran on the party list)
- Yakub Belkhoroyev (Independent), businessman, 2001 candidate for this seat

==== Did not file ====
- Ruslan Gagiyev (Independent), United Russia party official
- Musa Gazgireyev (Independent), construction businessman
- Maksharip Martazanov (Independent), Qadi of Ingushetia (1999–present)
- Salman Sautiyev (Independent), pensioner
- Khuseyn Zyazikov (Independent), chief doctor of the republican dermatovenerologic dispensary

==== Declined ====
- Alikhan Amirkhanov (CPRF), incumbent Member of State Duma (2001–present), 2002 presidential candidate (ran on the party list)

==== Results ====
Summary of the 7 December 2003 Russian legislative election in the Ingushetia constituency
Candidate	Party	Votes	%
Bashir Kodzoyev	Independent	44,179	50.63%
Musa Ozdoyev	People's Party	10,969	12.57%
Alikhan Parov	Independent	7,255	8.31%
Magomed-Sharip Tsechoyev	Rodina	4,888	5.60%
Musa Darsigov	Independent	2,225	2.55%
Idris Abadiyev	Independent	2,101	2.41%
Zaurbek Malsagov	Yabloko	1,974	2.26%
Musa Guliyev	Social Democratic Party	1,719	1.97%
Magomed Batayev	Great Russia – Eurasian Union	1,494	1.71%
Khavazh Khashiyev	Independent	1,242	1.42%
Magomed Gaparkhoyev	Independent	835	0.96%
Khizir Tsechoyev	Independent	781	0.89%
against all		4,420	5.07%
Total		87,598	100%

=== 2016 ===
==== Declared candidates ====
- Ilyas Bogatyrev (CPRF), Member of People's Assembly of the Republic of Ingushetia (2003–present)
- Valery Borshchyov (Yabloko), former Member of State Duma (1994–1999)
- Kazbek Chemkhilgov (The Greens), former acting Minister of Construction of Ingushetia (2009–2010)
- Magamet Dzaurov (Rodina), businessman
- Islam Gadiyev (LDPR), Member of Magas City Council (2015–present), IT specialist
- Mukhamedali Guseinov (CPCR), homemaker
- Alikhan Kharsiyev (United Russia), businessman
- Abdulmazhit Martazanov (A Just Russia), Member of Magas City Council (2015–present), Ingush State University department of taxation head
- Boris Yevloyev (Independent), Federal Antimonopoly Service regional office staffer

==== Failed to qualify ====
- Bashir Keligov (Independent), private security businessman
- Leyla Keligova (Independent), pensioner

==== Declined ====
- Yushaa Gazgireyev (United Russia), construction businessman, former Gazprom executive (lost the primary, ran on the party list)
- Belan Khamchiev (United Russia), Member of State Duma (2007–present) (ran for People's Assembly of the Republic of Ingushetia)

==== Results ====
Summary of the 18 September 2016 Russian legislative election in the Ingushetia constituency
Candidate	Party	Votes	%
Alikhan Kharsiyev	United Russia	125,921	70.65%
Abdulmazhit Martazanov	A Just Russia	18,070	10.14%
Boris Yevloyev	Independent	9,011	5.06%
Magamet Dzaurov	Rodina	6,872	3.86%
Ilyas Bogatyrev	Communist Party	5,037	2.83%
Kazbek Chemkhilgov	The Greens	5,036	2.83%
Islam Gadiyev	Liberal Democratic Party	4,331	2.43%
Valery Borshchyov	Yabloko	2,756	1.55%
Mukhamedali Guseinov	Communists of Russia	179	0.10%
Total		178,223	100%

=== 2021 ===
==== Declared candidates ====
- Islam Gadiyev (LDPR), Member of People's Assembly of the Republic of Ingushetia (2016–present), 2016 candidate for this seat
- Khamzat Kodzoyev (CPRF), former First Deputy Chief of Staff to the President of Ingushetia (2001–2002), businessman
- Abdulmazhit Martazanov (SR–ZP), Member of Magas City Council (2015–present), Ingush State University department of taxation head, 2016 candidate for this seat
- Bagaudin Seinaroyev (RPPSS), Deputy Mayor of Sunzha (2019–present)
- Muslim Tatriyev (United Russia), Rosneft executive

==== Withdrawn candidates ====
- Ayup Gagiyev (Yabloko), Chairman of the Constitutional Court of Ingushetia (2009–present)

==== Failed to qualify ====
- Aslangerey Khamkhoyev (Independent), retired gas executive

==== Did not file ====
- Khusen Kodzoyev (Independent), unemployed
- Adam Tsechoyev (RPSS), construction businessman

==== Declined ====
- Alikhan Kharsiyev (United Russia), incumbent Member of State Duma (2016–present)

==== Results ====
Summary of the 17-19 September 2021 Russian legislative election in the Ingushetia constituency
Candidate	Party	Votes	%
Muslim Tatriyev	United Russia	141,040	71.99%
Abulmazhit Martazanov	A Just Russia — For Truth	19,572	9.99%
Khamzat Kodzoyev	Communist Party	12,820	6.54%
Islam Gadiyev	Liberal Democratic Party	12,479	6.37%
Bagaudin Seinaroyev	Party of Pensioners	8,347	4.26%
Total		267,967	100%

=== 2026 ===
==== Declared candidates ====
- Gelani Gadiyev (LDPR), agricultural executive
- Khamzat Kodzoyev (CPRF), former First Deputy Chief of Staff to the President of Ingushetia (2001–2002), businessman, 2021 candidate for this seat
- Ruslan Ozdoyev (A Just Russia), Member of People's Assembly of the Republic of Ingushetia (2003–2008, 2021–present)
- Muslim Tatriyev (United Russia), incumbent Member of State Duma (2021–present)

==== Declined ====
- Amir Lyanov (United Russia), Member of People's Assembly of the Republic of Ingushetia (2021–present), Gazprom executive (lost the primary)

==== Results ====
Summary of the 18-20 September 2026 Russian legislative election in the Ingushetia constituency
Candidate	Party	Votes	%
Muslim Tatriyev (incumbent)	United Russia	185,670	81.99%
Khamzat Kodzoyev	Communist Party	24,629	10.88%
Ruslan Ozdoyev	A Just Russia	10,657	4.71%
Gelani Gadiyev	Liberal Democratic Party	3,607	1.59%
Total		226,463	100%
