= Alkun =

Rural locality in Ingushetia

Alkun Алкун
- Selo

Other transcription(s)
  - Ingush: Оалкам
- Interactive map of Alkun
- Location of Alkun Alkun (Republic of Ingushetia)
- Coordinates: 42°58′15″N 45°01′19″E
- Country: Russia
- Federal subject: Ingushetia

Government
  - Head: Khairov Bakhit Khasanovich
- Elevation: 781 m (2,562 ft)

Population (2010 Census)
  - Total: 1,072
  - Estimate (2021): 1,473 (+37.4%)

Administrative status
  - Subordinated to: Sunzhensky District
- Time zone: UTC+3 (MSK)
- Postal code: 386243
- OKTMO ID: 26610435101

Alkun (Russian: Алкун; Ingush: Оалкам, romanized: Oalkam) is a rural locality (a selo) in Sunzhensky District of the Republic of Ingushetia, Russia, located on both banks of the Assa River. (Note: Alkun is made up of two villages: Lower Alkun, located on the left bank of the Assa River, and Upper Alkun, located on the right bank of the Assa River.) It forms the municipality of the rural settlement of Alkun as the only settlement in its composition.

The exact time of the establishment of Alkun can't be established from documents. The area of the village was inhabited by Ingush during the Late Middle Ages and the village can be considered one of the oldest in the plain Ingushetia. Since 1830s, Alkun was marked on Russian maps. In 1860, the population of Alkun was evicted by the Russian authorities and their land was given to the Cossacks, who established their settlements on the site of the former Alkun. In 1873, with the permission of the Russian authorities, the Alkun khutor (later the Lower Alkun) was established by settlers from the Khamkhin society of mountainous Ingushetia, and in 1874 the Serali Opiev's khutor (later Upper Alkun) was established by settlers from the village of Tsecha-Akhki.

With the establishment of Soviet rule, Alkun was part of the Mountainous ASSR from 1921 to 1923, and from 1923 to 1934 part of the Galashkinsky Raion of the Ingush autonomous oblast; from 1934 to 1936 part of the Checheno-Ingush Autonomous Oblast; from 1936 to 1992 part of the Checheno-Ingush Autonomous Soviet Socialist Republic. In 1944 the village's population like the whole Ingush and Chechen population of the Republic was deported to Central Asia and the Republic was dissolved. Upper Alkun was renamed as Dachnoye and Lower Alkun renamed as Lesogorye. After the restoration of the Republic in 1957, the villages were renamed back to their original names, Lower and Upper Alkun. In 1993, Alkun became part of Ingushetia.

Speaking of archaeological discoveries, Alkun has residential towers and a semi-underground crypt; to the north-west of the village is an Alanic catacomb burial ground, which dates to the 8–9th centuries. Near the village of Upper Alkun there are remains of a barrier wall, and there was also a rich military box burial, which dates to the early 15th century.

== Geography ==
Alkun is located in the mountainous forest of Ingushetia, on both banks of the Assa River at the entrance to its gorge, on the slope of the Ghalghai-duq ridge, which separates the river valley of Assa from the river valley of Fortanga. The village is 42 km southwest of the administrative city of the Sunzhensky District, Sunzha. Additionally, the nearest settlements in the north-west are the villages of Muzhichi and Galashki, and in the north-east, the village of Dattykh.

== History ==
=== Background and archaeological monuments ===
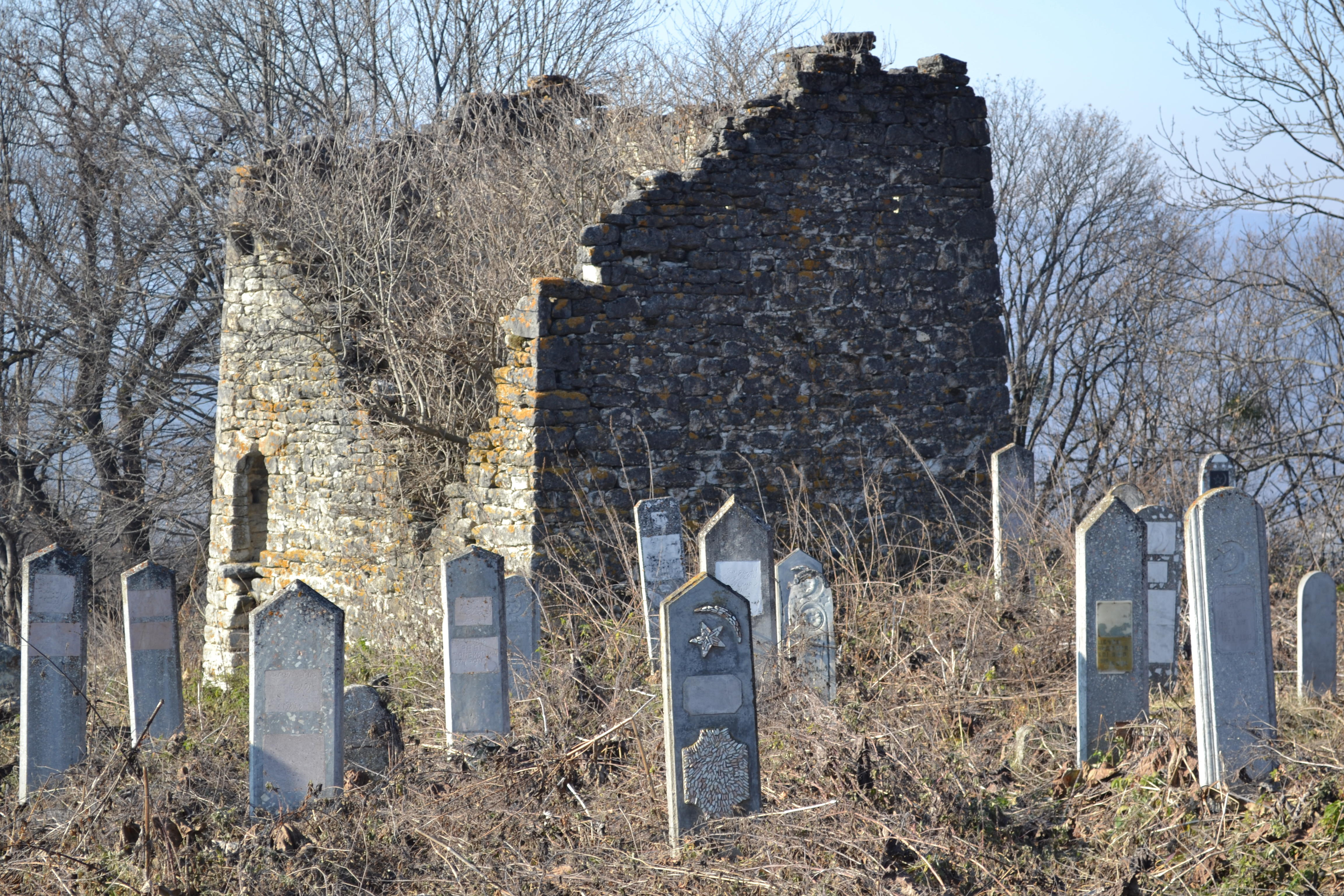
Semi-combat tower in Upper Alkun, Ingushetia.

The exact time of the establishment of Alkun can't be established from documents. Based on the remains of material culture like the Gagiev towers which date to the 12th-17th centuries, the area of the village was inhabited by Ingush during the Late Middle Ages and the village can be considered one of the oldest in the plain Ingushetia. In the 14–16th centuries, after the invasion of Timur in the Caucasus, the ancestors of the Ingush families of Akhilgovs and Tsitskievs of the Obankhoy teip presumably inhabited the site of Lower Alkun. The village was made up of two villages: Lower Alkun, located on the left bank of the Assa River, and Upper Alkun, located on the right bank of the Assa River. There are two cemeteries in Upper Alkun.

2,5–3 km southwest of Lower Alkun, located on the right bank of the Assa River at the entrance to its Gorge, is located one of the Lower Alkun's towers. The tower has been preserved to a height of 6–6.5 m; base area is 8X6 m; wall thickness is 0.65 m. At 60–70 m deep into the Assa Gorge are two more towers. The first has been preserved to a height of 7,5–8 m, base area 6–6,5 m, wall thickness 0,70 m. The second tower has been preserved to a height of 7,5–8,5 m and its western wall has been preserved to a width of 6 m. Among the Muslim cemetery of Upper Alkun is located the Upper Alkun's residential tower, which according to Evgeny Krupnov, belonged to the Bokiev family. The tower has been preserved to a height of 6.5 m, the base area is 7.7X6, the thickness of the walls is about 70 cm. It is similar to the semi-combat tower of Falkhan. Above Upper Alkun, in the narrowest part of the Assa Gorge (at 25 m deep), is located a barrier wall. It was built without a foundation, on a rock, from stones laid on lime. The height of the masonry is 2,60 m; the thickness is 0,50–0,60 m. There was once a sanctuary of Alkun.

0,5 km north-west of Upper Alkun is located a catacomb burial ground, dated to the 8–9th centuries AD. On the eastern outskirts of Upper Alkun, a drilled stone axe from the middle of the 2nd millennium BC was accidentally found. Near Upper Alkun is also a rich Ingush military box burial, which dates to the early 15th century. It contained not only a severely damaged chain mail, carefully folded into four and left on top of the head of the buried person, but also a helmet, leotards, an axe, a bow, a quiver with arrows, a saber, a combat knife, Golden Horde-era coins and ceramics.

=== Imperial Russian rule ===
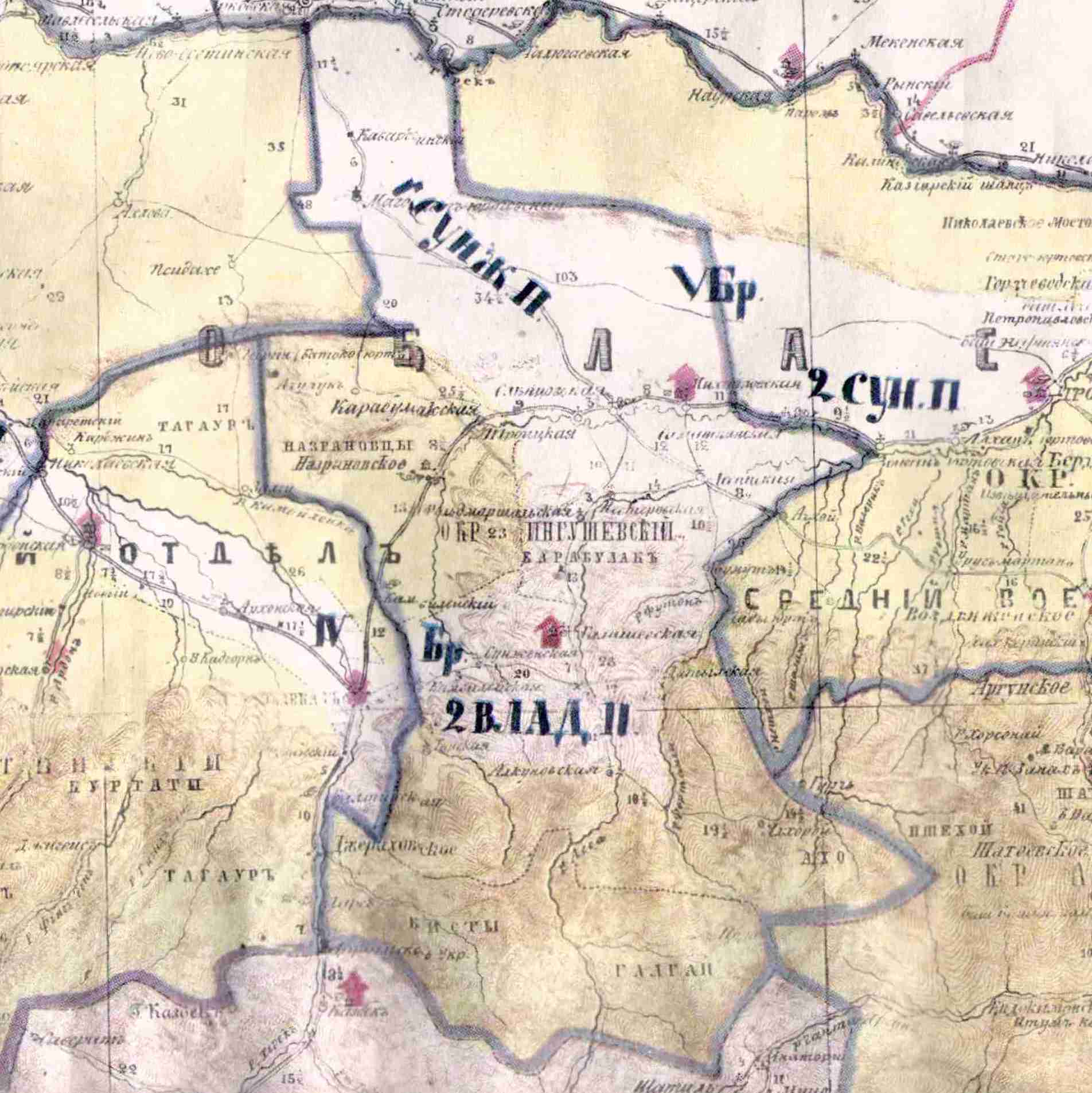
Alkunovskaya stanitsa on the map of Caucasus krai in 1864 as part of the Ingush okrug (1862–1871).

The village has been indicated on maps since 1830. In 1860, the population of Alkun was evicted by the Russian authorities and their land was given to the 1st Sunzhensky Cossack Regiment, who established the Alkunsky post and Alkunovskaya stanitsa on the site of the former settlement. Cossacks lived here for several years; there were military Cossack posts on the southern outskirts of the village in two places. The Ingush were forced to rent land from the Cossacks settled on their lands. Until 1918, they paid rent to the Cossacks for their own lands.

In 1873, with the permission of the Russian authorities, the Alkun khutor (later the Lower Alkun) was established by settlers from the Khamkhin society of mountainous Ingushetia, and in 1874 the Serali Opiev's khutor (later Upper Alkun) was established by settlers from the village of Tsecha-Akhki. From 1871 to 1880 on the maps of the Caucasus and in the List of populated places of the Terek Oblast, Alkun is marked as the Alkun post; from 1886, Alkun is marked as the Alkun khutor. The farmstead was populated by Ingush families of Shadievs, Astimirovs, Arapkhanovs, Uruskhanovs, Dudarkievs, Nalgievs, Balaevs. The foreman of the village was Saadulla Koev. In 1890–91, there was a school, a mosque, a mill and a police post in the Alkun khutor.

=== Soviet rule ===
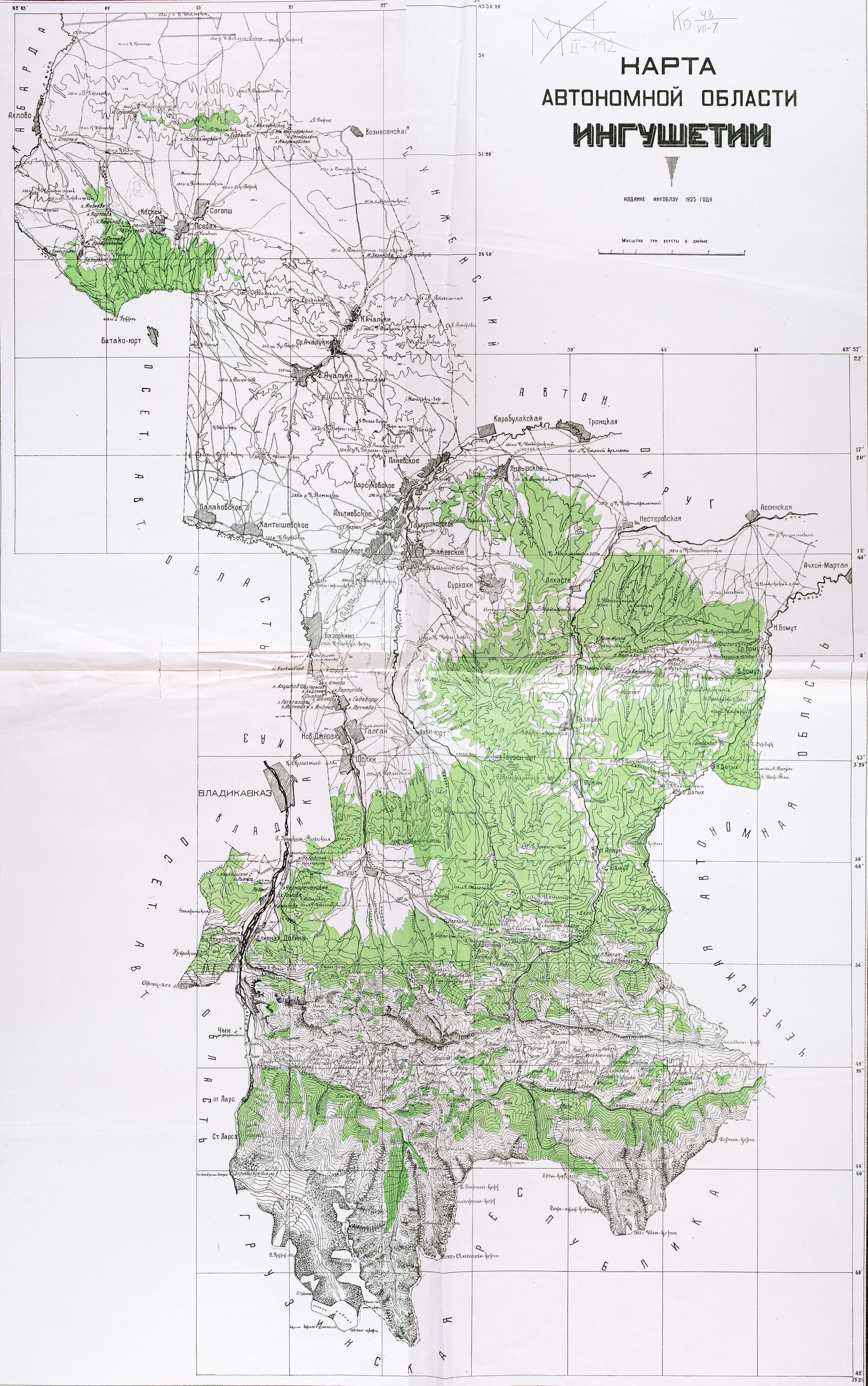
Lower and Upper Alkuns on the map of Ingush Autonomous Oblast.

With the establishment of Soviet rule, Alkun was part of the Mountainous ASSR from 1921 to 1923, and it had a village council. From 1923 to 1934 the village was part of the Galashkinsky raion of the Ingush Autonomous Oblast; with the merging of Chechen and Ingush Autonomous Oblasts into Checheno-Ingush Autonomous Oblast (later the Checheno-Ingush Autonomous Soviet Socialist Republic) in 1934, Alkun was part of it. In 1944 the village's population like the whole Ingush and Chechen population of the Republic was deported to Central Asia and the Republic was dissolved. Upper Alkun was renamed as Dachnoye and Lower Alkun renamed as Lesogorye. After the restoration of the Chechen-Ingush Autonomous Soviet Socialist Republic in 1957, the villages were renamed back to their original names, Lower and Upper Alkun.

=== Modern ===
In 1993, Alkun became part of Ingushetia and its administration was separated from Muzhichi. Its foreman was Magomed Khamkhoev. In accordance with the law of the Republic of Ingushetia of 2009 "On establishing the boundaries of municipalities and granting them the status of rural, urban settlements, municipal districts and urban districts", the rural settlement of Alkun was formed. In present day, the village is populated by Ingush families of Khamkhoy, Tsechoi, Yevloy, Khoaqoy, Barkhoy, Egakhoy, Ozdoy, Khoanoy, Goratoy, Barkinkhoy and Khoartoy.

== Demographics ==
According to the Russian Empire census of 1897 the Alkun khutor had 57 households with a population of 377 (191 men and 186 women); also was present a mosque, two shops with manufactured goods and one with dairy goods a country road and a wheeled road. Sarali Opiev's khutor had 21 households with a population of 192 (91 men and 101 women). It also had a wheeled and country road. This situation remained until 1916.

According to the 1926 Soviet census, the population of Lower Alkun was 322 (171 men and 151 women), for whom were intended 78 peasant farms, and it also had a village council; the population of Upper Alkun was 203 (104 men and 99 women), for whom were intended 36 peasant farms. There were no non-peasant farms in both settlements.

In the 1990s the population of the villages of Upper and Lower Alkun was 473, in addition to them, 119 refugees from Chechnya and 15 refugees from North Ossetia also lived there.

== Sources ==
=== Russian sources ===
- Chahkiev, Djabrail (1988). "Кольчатый доспех позднесредневековых вайнахских воинов" [Ringed armor of Late Medieval Vainakh warriors]. In Mamaev, Khamid; Muzhukhoev, Maksharip; Chahkiev, Djabrail (eds.). Новые археолого-этнографические материалы по истории Чечено-Ингушетии [New archaeological and ethnographic materials on the history of Checheno-Ingushetia] (in Russian). Grozny: Tip. im. I. I. Zabolotnogo. pp. 67–84.
- Chahkiev, Djabrail; Narozhnyi, Evgeny (1990). "Погребение знатного горского воина начала ХV века из селения Верхний Алкун (Чечено-Ингушетия)" [Burial of a noble mountain warrior of the beginning of the 15th century from the village of Upper Alkun (Checheno-Ingushetia)]. In Khudyakov, Yuly; Plotnikov, Yu. (eds.). Военное дело древнего и средневекового населения Северной и Центральной Азии [Military affairs of the ancient and medieval population of North and Central Asia] (in Russian). Novosibirsk: Cooperative "Polygraph" at the Institute of Economics and Production of the Siberian Branch of the USSR Academy of Sciences. pp. 129–140.
- Dolgieva, Maryam; Agieva, Lemka; Dudarov, Abdul-Mazhit; Dzumatova, Zaret; Dzauriva, Tanzila; Kartoev, Magomet; Katieva, Madina (2023). "К истории некоторых населенных пунктов Ингушетии" [To the history of some settlements of Ingushetia]. Bulletin of the Ingush Research Institute of Humanities Named After Ch. E. Akhriev (in Russian) (1): 10–25.
- Kurkiev, Alimbek (1979). Основные вопросы лексикологии ингушского языка [The main questions of the lexicology of the Ingush language] (in Russian). Grozny: Checheno-Ingush Book Publishing House. pp. 1–254.
- Malsagov, Zaurbek (1963). Ozdoeva, F. (ed.). Грамматика ингушского языка [Grammar of the Ingush language] (in Ingush and Russian). Vol. 5 (2nd ed.). Grozny: Checheno-Ingush Book Publishing House. pp. 1–164.
- Malsagova, R. (2011-03-30). "Докку Умаров убит" [Dokku Umarov killed]. Kavkazskiy Dnevnik. Archived from the original on 2013-11-05.
- Markovin, Vladimir (1975). "Некоторые особенности средневековой ингушской архитектуры" [Some features of medieval Ingush architecture]. Архитектурное Наследство (in Russian) (23): 119–126.
- Vinogradov, Vitaly; Markovin, Vladimir (1966). Археологические памятники ЧИАССР (Материалы к археологической карте) [Archaeological monuments of the Chechen Autonomous Soviet Socialist Republic (Material for the archaeological map)] (in Russian). Grozny: Checheno-Ingush Book Publishing House. pp. 1–150.
- "Закон Республики Ингушетия от 23 февраля 2009 года № 5-рз "Об установлении границ муниципальных образований Республики Ингушетия и наделении их статусом сельского, городского поселения, муниципального района и городского округа"" [Law of the Republic of Ingushetia dated February 23, 2009 No. 5–section "On establishing the boundaries of municipalities of the Republic of Ingushetia and granting them the status of rural, urban settlements, municipal districts and urban districts"]. docs.cntd.ru (in Russian). 2009. Archived from the original on 2018-01-28.
