= Alkhasty =

Village in Ingushetia, Russia

Alkhasty Алхасты
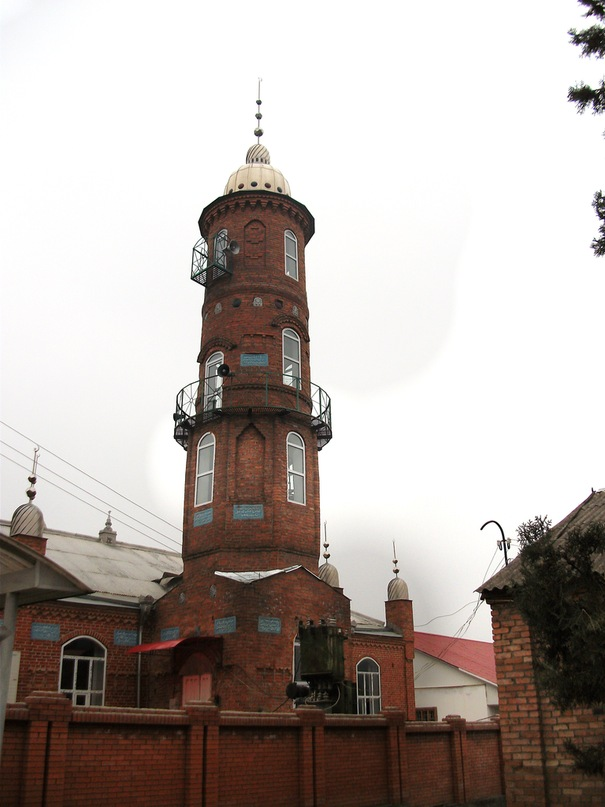
- Interactive map of Alkhasty
- Location of Alkhasty Alkhasty (Republic of Ingushetia)
- Coordinates: 43.1818°N 44.9944°E
- Country: Russia
- Federal subject: Ingushetia
- Founded: 1864
- Elevation: 510 m (1,670 ft)

Population
  - Estimate (2025): 4,928 )
- Time zone: UTC+3 (MSK)
- Postal code: 386241
- OKTMO ID: 26610420101

Alkhasty (Russian: Алхасты Ingush: Алхасте) is a Selo (village) located in the Sunzhensky District of the Republic of Ingushetia, Russia.

== Georgraphy ==
Alkhasty is located on the left bank of the river Assa and 14 km southwest from Sunzha.

The Selo is located 510 m (1,670 ft) above sea level.

== History ==
In 1861, in the Assinsky Gorge, not far from the village of Muzhichi, the Cossack village of Feldmarshalskaya was founded, but due to the excessively harsh terrain and high mortality of the population from diseases in 1864, it was decided to move the village to approximately where the village of Alkhasty is located now.

In 1917 the village of Feldmarshalskaya was attacked and destroyed.

In 1922 the village of Alkhasty was restored.

In 1944 the village was renamed to Krasnooktyabrskoye.

In 1989 the village was renamed back to Alkhasty.

== Demographics ==
Historical Population of Alkhasty:

Historical population
Year	Pop.	±%
1926	386	—
2006	3,889	+907.5%
2025	4,928	+26.7%
