= Mukharbek Barakhoyev =

Russian politician (born 1971)

- Мухарбек Барахоев
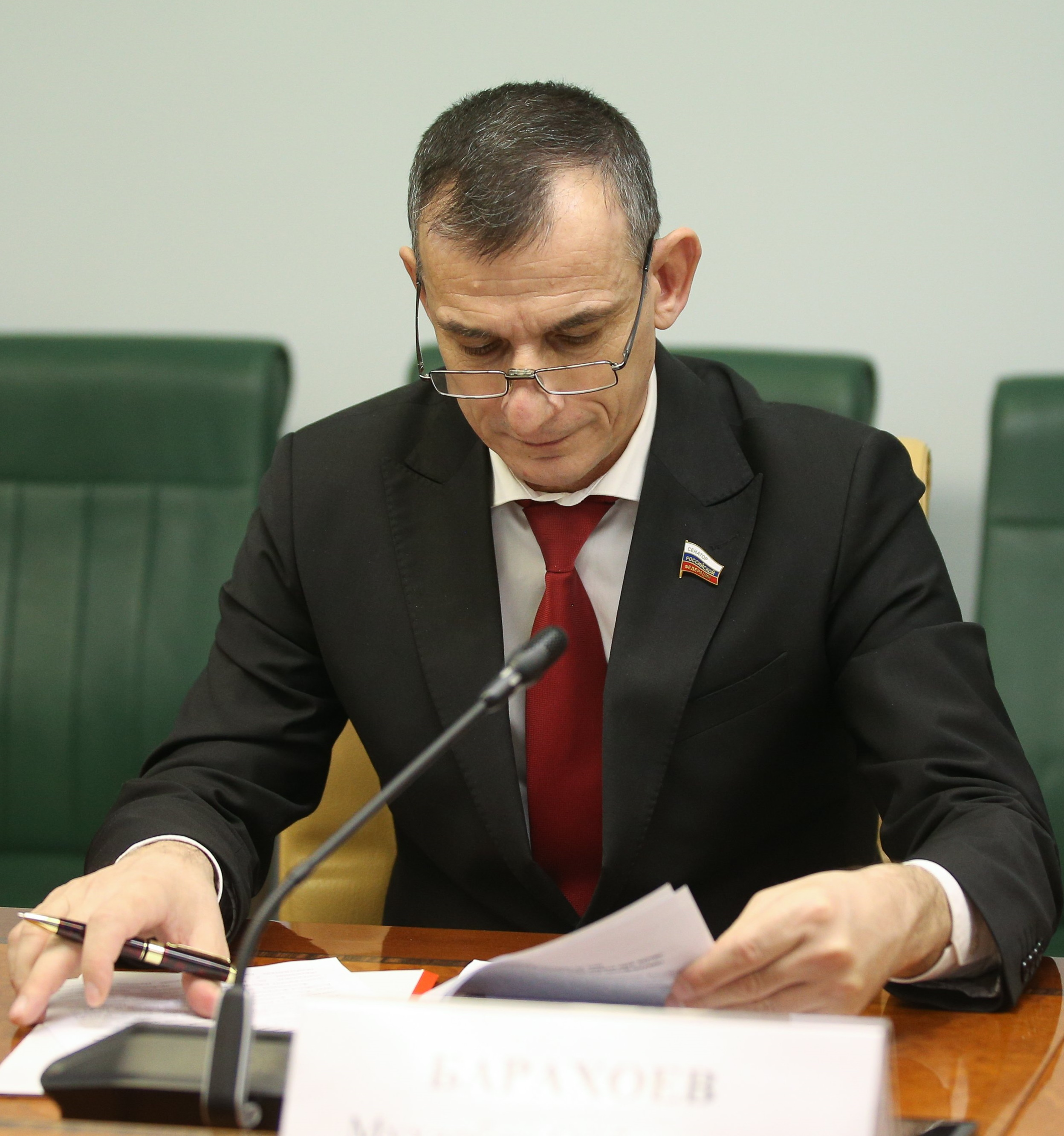

Senator from Ingushetia
- In office 8 September 2019 – 9 September 2024
- Preceded by: Musa Chiliev
- Succeeded by: Mikhail Ilezov

Personal details
- Born: Mukharbek Barakhoyev; 4 January 1971 (age 55) Alkun, Checheno-Ingush Autonomous Soviet Socialist Republic, Soviet Union
- Party: United Russia
- Education: Ingush State University

Mukharbek Oybertovich Barakhoyev (Russian: Мухарбек Ойбертович Барахоев; born 4 January 1971) is a Russian politician serving as a senator from Ingushetia since 8 September 2019.

== Career ==
Mukharbek Barakhoyev was born on 4 January 1971 in Alkun, Checheno-Ingush Autonomous Soviet Socialist Republic. In 2000, he graduated from the Ingush State University. From 1989 to 1991, he served in the Soviet Armed Forces. From 1993 to 1995, he worked as a teacher of physical education and labor in Alkun secondary school. From 2001 to 2018, he served as the head of the administration of Alkun. On 8 September 2019, the deputies of the People’s Assembly of Ingushetia elected Makhmud-Ali Kalimatov as Head of the Republic, and on the same day he appointed Mukharbek Barakhoyev as the representative of the executive authority of Ingushetia in the Federation Council.

=== Sanctions ===
Mukharbek Barakhoyev is under personal sanctions introduced by the European Union, the United Kingdom, the US, Canada, Switzerland, Australia, Ukraine, New Zealand, for ratifying the decisions of the "Treaty of Friendship, Cooperation and Mutual Assistance between the Russian Federation and the Donetsk People's Republic and between the Russian Federation and the Luhansk People's Republic" and providing political and economic support for Russia's annexation of Ukrainian territories.

== Awards ==
2023 - Medal of the Order "For Merit to the Fatherland" II degree

2023 - Gratitude of the Government of the Russian Federation
