= 1995 Russian legislative election =

- 17 December 1995

All 450 seats in the State Duma 226 seats needed for a majority
- Registered: 107,496,856
- Turnout: 69,204,819; 64.38% (▲9.57 pp)
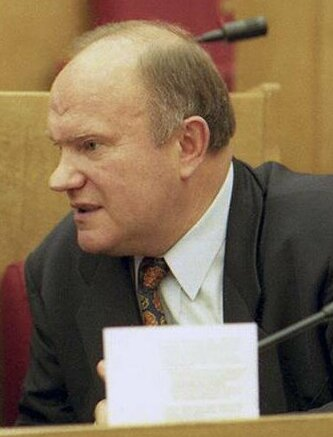

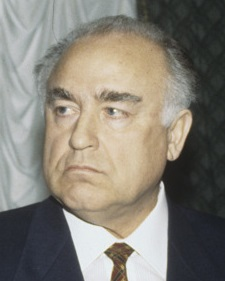

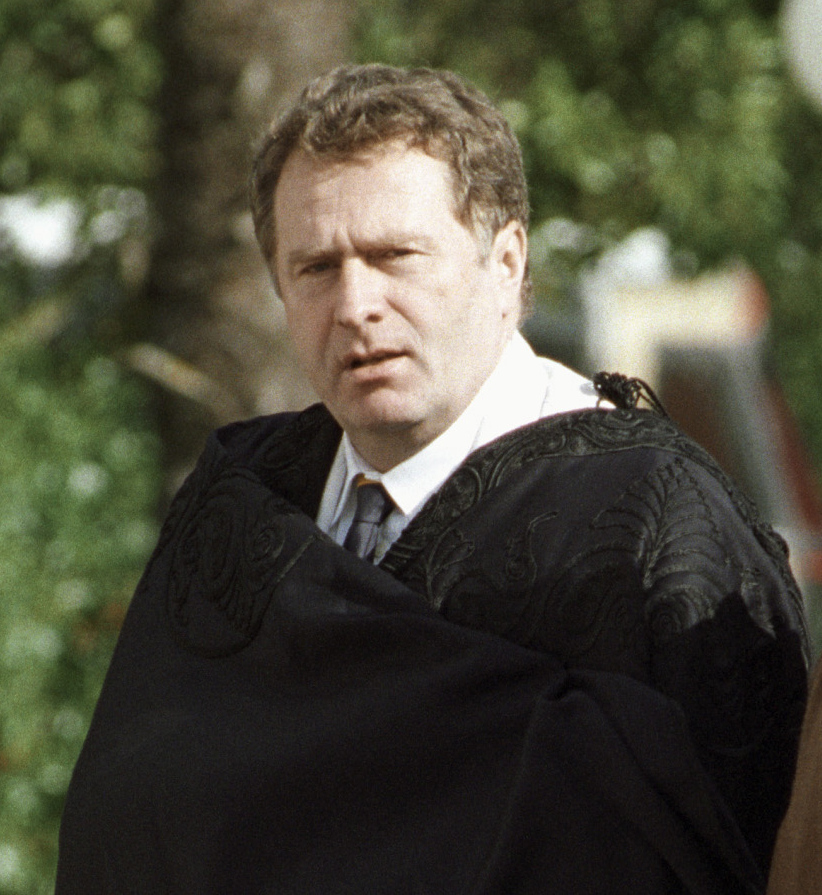

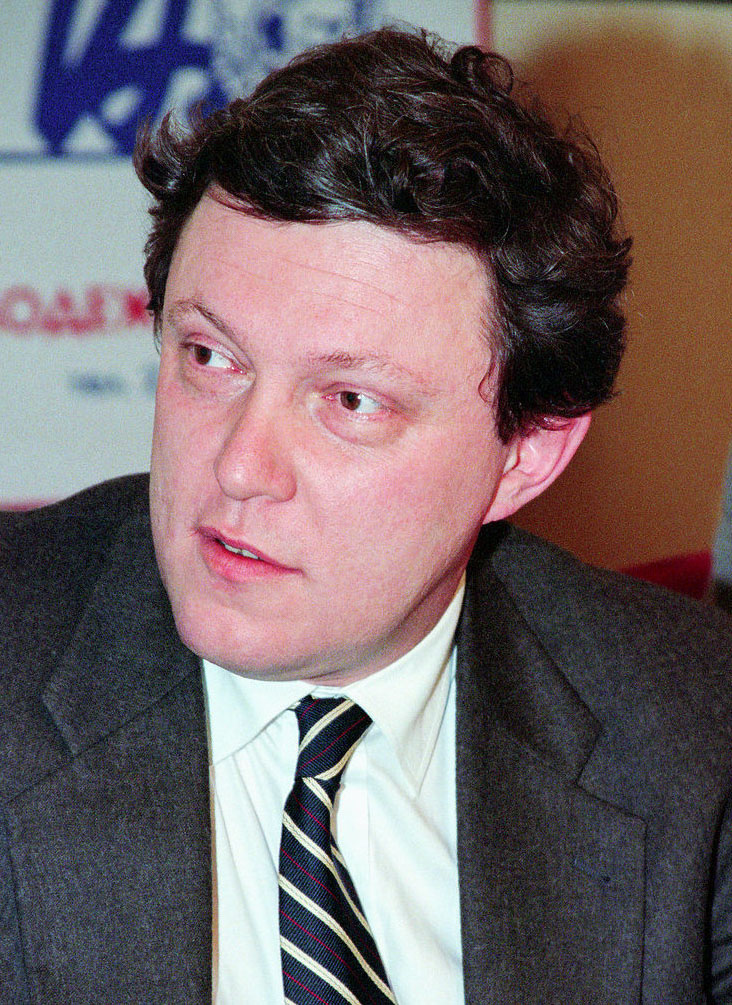
	First party	Second party
Leader	Gennady Zyuganov	Viktor Chernomyrdin
Party	KPRF	NDR
Leader since	14 February 1993	12 May 1995
Last election	42 seats, 11.55%	New
Seats won	157	55
Seat change	▲115	New
Popular vote	15,432,963	7,009,291
Percentage	22.30% (PL)	10.13% (PL)
Swing	▲10.75%	New
	Third party	Fourth party
Leader	Vladimir Zhirinovsky	Grigory Yavlinsky
Party	LDPR	Yabloko
Leader since	13 December 1989	16 October 1993
Last election	64 seats, 21.35%	27 seats, 7.32%
Seats won	51	45
Seat change	▼13	▲18
Popular vote	7,737,431	4,767,384
Percentage	11.18% (PL)	6.89% (PL)
Swing	▼10.17%	▼0.43%
Chairman of the State Duma before election
Ivan Rybkin
Ivan Rybkin Bloc
Elected Chairman of the State Duma
Gennadiy Seleznyov
CPRF

Legislative elections was held in Russia on 17 December 1995 to elect all 450 seats in the 2nd State Duma of the Russian Federation.

The anti-government Communist Party won a total of 157 seats, the most deputies of any single bloc in the chamber. The pro-government Our Home – Russia came second with 55 seats, with the far-right Liberal Democratic Party of Russia falling to third place with 51. As well as the fourth placed Yabloko, only these four parties crossed the 5% threshold to win party-list seats.

== Electoral system ==
The election law adopted for the 1995 election was similar to that adopted for the 1993 election, with some minor modifications. First, to secure a place on the proportional representation ballot, parties had to have registered with the Ministry of Justice no later than six months before the election, and the number of signatures they had to gather rose from 100,000 to 200,000. Second, invalid votes were now included in the calculation of the 5% threshold. Third, on the single-member district ballot, party endorsements of candidates were indicated.

== Political blocs ==
Political parties and blocs in the 1995 election
#	Bloc	Abbr.	First troika	Political position	Ideologies
1	Women of Russia	ZhR	Alevtina Fedulova • Ekaterina Lakhova • Galina Klimantova	Centre	Women's rights / Pacifism
2	Social Patriotic Movement "Derzhava"	Derzhava	Alexander Rutskoy • Viktor Kobelev • Konstantin Dushenov	Right-wing	Russian nationalism / Social conservatism
3	Social Political Movement "Duma-96"	Duma-96	Vladimir Burenin • Mikhail Simonov • Georgy Kondratyev	Centre	Centrism / Conservatism
4	Transformation of the Fatherland; Transformation of the Fatherland, Free Democratic Party, All-Russian Party for Safety of Man	PO	Eduard Rossel • Yury Nozhikov (Note: Withdrew) • Viktor Yakimov • Marina Salye	Centre	Regionalism / Autonomism
5	Tikhonov–Tupolev–Tikhonov; Consolidation Party, League of Cooperatives and Entrepreneurs	TTT	Alexander Tikhonov • Aleksey Tupolev • Viktor Tikhonov	Centre	Centrism
6	Russian All-People's Movement	ROD	Alexander Bozhenov • Valery Moshnyakov • Vladimir Platonov	Centre	Cossacks interests
7	All-Russian Muslim Social Movement "Nur"	NUR	Halit Yakhin • Vafa Yarullin • Anver Shagidullin	Centre	Muslim interests / Islamic democracy
8	Federal Democratic Movement	FDD	Oleg Novikov • Oleg Kalugin • Rimma Kazakova	Centre	Federalism
9	Cause of Peter the First (Note: Also known as the "38 Words" bloc since its full name included a 38-word long list of member parties.); Tourist and Sports Union of Russia, Union of TV and Radio Broadcasting Workers, Consumer Society of Automobile Equipment	DPP	Valentin Dikul • Vadim Voevodin • Yan Koltunov	Right-wing	National conservatism / Monarchism
10	Interethnic Union; Congress of Civic Concord, RHDP, Association of Koreans in Russia	MNS	Abdulah Mikitaev • Makhmut Gareev • Alexander Zaytsev	Centre	Multiculturalism
11	Socio-Political Movement "Stable Russia"	SR	Oleg Petrov • Elina Bystritskaya • Alexander Gorlov	Centre-right	Conservatism
12	Frontier Generations; Socio-Political Youth Movement, MZhK Union of Russia	PR	Dmitry Solonnikov • Nikolay Pelepeshin • Marat Bariev	Centre	Youth politics
13	My Fatherland	MO	Boris Gromov • Stanislav Shatalin • Joseph Kobzon	Centre-left	Social democracy
14	For the Motherland! RSVA, NPP, New Russia	ZR	Vladimir Polevanov • Yevgeny Podkolzin • Eduard Baltin	Right-wing	Conservatism / Anti-Reformism
15	Common Cause; Common Cause, Human Circle	OD	Irina Khakamada • Rolan Bykov • Vladimir Dzhanibekov	Centre-right	Liberalism
16	Bloc of Independents; ODC, All-Russian Tatar Cultural and Educational Center	BN	Yevgeny Fyodorov • Ilya Roitman • Vladimir Komchatov	Centre-right	Conservatism
17	Our Home – Russia	NDR	Viktor Chernomyrdin • Nikita Mikhalkov • Lev Rokhlin	Centre-right	Liberal conservatism / Fiscal conservatism
18	Pamfilova–Gurov–Lysenko; RPRF, Young Republicans Union	PGL	Ella Pamfilova • Alexander Gurov • Vladimir Lysenko	Centre-right	Classical liberalism / Atlanticism
19	"Yabloko" Social Association	Yabloko	Grigory Yavlinsky • Vladimir Lukin • Tatiana Yarygina	Centre-left	Social democracy / Social liberalism
20	Forward, Russia!	VR	Boris Fyodorov • Bela Denisenko • Alexander Vladislavlev	Centre-right	Liberal democracy / Liberal conservatism
21	89 Regions of Russia; VR, ANP	89	Pavel Medvedev (only elected deputy)	Centre	Regionalism
22	Ecological Party of Russia "KEDR"	KEDR	Anatoly Panfilov • Leonid Yakubovich • Artyom Tarasov	Centre	Green politics / Agrarianism
23	Democratic Choice of Russia – United Democrats; DVR, KPR, RPSD, KNOR	DVR-OD	Yegor Gaidar • Sergei Kovalev • Lidiya Fedoseyeva-Shukshina	Centre-right	Liberal conservatism / Anti-communism
24	Party of Russian Unity and Accord	PRES	Sergey Shakhray • Valery Bykov • Vladimir Ivankov	Centre-right	Moderate liberalism / Conservatism / Regionalism
25	Communist Party of the Russian Federation	CPRF	Gennady Zyuganov • Svetlana Goryacheva • Aman Tuleyev	Left-wing to far-left	Communism / Marxism–Leninism / Left-wing nationalism
26	Stanislav Govorukhin Bloc; All-Russian Trade Union Association, People's Alliance, RHDD	BSG	Stanislav Govorukhin • Oleg Rumyantsev • Viktor Aksyuchits	Right-wing	Statism / Conservatism
27	Association of Lawyers of Russia	AAR	Alexey Malayev • Gasan Mirzoyev • Anatoly Fedoseev	Centre	Rule of law
28	National Republican Party of Russia	NRPR	Nikolay Lysenko • Nikolay Pavlov • Konstantin Ovchinnikov	Far-right	Solzhenitsynism / Russian ultranationalism
29	Social Democrats; SDS, Young Social Democrats of Russia, RDDR	SD	Gavriil Popov • Vasily Lipitsky • Oleg Bogomolov	Centre-left	Social democracy
30	Power to the People! ROS, Mothers for Social Justice	V–N!	Nikolai Ryzhkov • Sergey Baburin • Elena Shuvalova	Right-wing	Patriotism / Social conservatism / Pochvennichestvo
31	Congress of Russian Communities	KRO	Yury Skokov • Alexander Lebed • Sergey Glazyev	Right-wing to far-right	Russian nationalism / National conservatism
32	Trade Unions and Industrialists – Union of Labour; ROPP, Trade Unions of Russia to the Polls	ST	Vladimir Scherbakov • Mikhail Shmakov • Arkady Volsky	Centre-left	Labourism / Industrialism
33	Liberal Democratic Party of Russia	LDPR	Vladimir Zhirinovsky • Sergey Abeltsev • Alexander Vengerovsky	Right-wing to far-right	Right-wing populism / Pan-Slavism
34	Bloc of Djuna; Association of Military Journalists, AFZPP, ADVN, RKSP	Djuna	Eugenia Davitashvili • Andrey Volkov • Aleksandr Pankratov-Chyorny	Centre	Populism
35	Party of Workers' Self-Government	PST	Svyatoslav Fyodorov • Alexey Kazannik • Aleksandr Porokhovshchikov	Centre-left	Social democracy
36	Communists – Labour Russia – For the Soviet Union; RKRP, RPK	K–TR	Viktor Tyulkin • Anatoly Kryuchkov • Viktor Anpilov	Far-left	Communism / Marxism–Leninism / Anti-revisionism
37	Beer Lovers Party	PLP	Konstantin Kalachyov • Dmitry Shestakov • Andrey Palchevsky	Big tent	Joke party / Protectionism / Anti-establishment
38	Ivan Rybkin Bloc "Russia" People's Movement, Regions of Russia, RSM, Accord Movement, Union of Realists	BIR	Ivan Rybkin • Yury Petrov • Artur Chilingarov	Centre-left	Agrarianism / Social democracy
39	Party of Economic Freedom	PES	Konstantin Borovoi • Leonid Nekrasov • Vladimir Kovalyonok	Centre-right	Liberalism / Neoconservatism / Economic liberalism
40	People's Union	NS	Vladimir Lukyanov • Dmitry Galagan • Gennady Mironov	Big tent	Interests of defrauded depositors
41	Agrarian Party of Russia	APR	Mikhail Lapshin • Aleksandr Nazarchuk • Vasily Starodubtsev	Left-wing	Agrarian socialism / Collectivism
42	Christian Democratic Union – Christians of Russia	HDS	Vitaly Savitsky • Tatiana Ivanova • Alexander Kisilyov	Centre-right	Christian democracy
43	Union of Workers of Housing and Communal Services	SRZhKKh	Leonid Chernyshov • Pyotr Surov • Valery Avdeyev	Big tent	ZhKKh workers' interests

== Campaign ==
Out of the forty three parties and coalitions contesting the elections, only four cleared the 5% threshold to qualify for the proportional seats.

=== Pro-Government parties ===
Our Home – Russia had weightier resources and soon acquired the nickname of "party of power" for its reliance on elite political and economic office holders. It was also referred to as "Our Home Is Gazprom" for its close ties to Gazprom's substantial financial resources. Most of the cabinet ministers joined the bloc, and a number of business leaders and regional political elites affiliated with it. However, almost no other parties entered it, and many SMD candidates who had initially affiliated with the party soon left it. One of the early parties to enter the bloc, Sergei Shakhrai's Party of Russian Unity and Accord, also deserted it in August 1995. The party program called for "stability and development, democracy and patriotism, confidence and order" as well as "pragmatism" and "a civilized market". Other proposals were contradictory as the party proposed, among other things, to encourage foreign investment while protecting Russian manufacturers, and to promote agricultural reform while regulating land ownership.

In the election, the Our Home – Russia bloc took 10.1% of the vote, enough to form a faction in the State Duma but not enough to serve as a dominant or pivotal force in parliament or in the regions. At its peak, the party claimed the membership of around one third of Russia's governors. However, both the federal center and regional elites made only ephemeral commitments to Our Home – Russia.

=== Opposition parties ===
As a result of these elections, the Communists and their satellites, the Agrarians and other left-wing deputies, controlled a little less than the half of the seats. The populist LDPR occasionally sided with the left majority, but often supported the government. As in the previous Duma, the parliamentary groups of independent deputies had a significant influence on the balance of power in the parliament.

On 17 January 1996, Gennady Seleznyov, a deputy of the Communist Party in the Duma, was elected the Speaker of the Duma.

== Opinion polls ==
Polling firm	Fieldwork date	CPRF	LDPR	NDR	Yabloko	ZhR	KRO	DVR–OD	APR	PST	VR!	Derzhava	Other	Unsure	Not voting	Additional options
FOM	June 1995	8	5	4	7	4	4	3	3	3	4	1	48			(Note: Ivan Rybkin Bloc, DPR, PES, Republican Party, ROPP, Common Cause 1%, Democratic Russia 0%.)
FOM	July 1995	7	4	5	8	4	5	3	2	4	5	1	49			(Note: DPR 2%, Ivan Rybkin Bloc, Common Cause, Republican Party 1%, ROPP, Democratic Russia 0%.)
VCIOM	July 1995	8.0	8.7	—N/a	8.2	3.7	—N/a	3.7	1.9	5.0	2.4	4.1	1.3	29.6	18.4	(Note: DPR 2.0%, PRES 1.7%, PLP 0.7%, PES 0.6%.)
FOM	September 1995	10	5	6	6	7	—N/a	4	—N/a	—N/a	—N/a	—N/a	(Note: Less than 4% each.)	—N/a	—N/a	—N/a
VCIOM	15–19 Sep 1995	9	6	5	8	5	2	3	3	4	2	2	0.4	20	17	(Note: Power to the People, PLP, DR, Union of Labour, Common Cause, PES, Communists and Working Russia, Union of Patriots, KEDR, PRES 1%, Republican Party 0.5%, Ivan Rybkin Bloc, People's Union 0.4%, NRPR 0%.)
Vox Populi	9 Oct 1995	14	2.4	10	8	7	2.5	4.6	1.8	—N/a	4	—N/a	—N/a	—N/a	—N/a	(Note: PRES 0.5%.)
Rossiskiye Vesti	22 Nov 1995	14	4	5	8	5	5	3	2	—N/a	—N/a	—N/a	—N/a	—N/a	—N/a	—N/a
VCIOM	1 Dec 1995	23	11.5	13.1	13.1	—N/a	13.1	—N/a	—N/a	—N/a	—N/a	—N/a	—N/a	—N/a	—N/a	—N/a
FOM	December 1995	17	3	5	5	6	2	2	3	2	2	2	<1	20	15	(Note: Against all 2%, Power to the People, PLP 1%.)
Vox Populi	9 Dec 1995	22.9	5.7	10.9	9.5	—N/a	6.5	—N/a	—N/a	—N/a	—N/a	—N/a	—N/a	—N/a	—N/a	—N/a
VCIOM	6–12 Dec 1995	13.7	7.6	6.7	6.5	6.6	—N/a	—N/a	—N/a	—N/a	—N/a	—N/a	—N/a	—N/a	—N/a	—N/a
ISSP	n/a	17.3	4.2	4.6	5.3	3.8	2.4	—N/a	2.2	2.8	3.7	3.7	—N/a	—N/a	—N/a	—N/a

== Results ==

Party	Party-list			Constituency			Total seats	+/–
Party	Votes	%	Seats	Votes	%	Seats	Total seats	+/–
Communist Party	15,432,963	22.73	99	8,636,392	12.78	58	157	+115
Liberal Democratic Party	7,737,431	11.40	50	3,801,971	5.63	1	51	–13
Our Home – Russia	7,009,291	10.33	45	3,808,745	5.64	10	55	New
Yabloko	4,767,384	7.02	31	2,209,945	3.27	14	45	+18
Women of Russia	3,188,813	4.70	0	712,072	1.05	3	3	–21
Communists and Working Russia for the Soviet Union	3,137,406	4.62	0	1,276,655	1.89	1	1	New
Congress of Russian Communities	2,980,137	4.39	0	1,987,665	2.94	5	5	New
Party of Workers' Self-Government	2,756,954	4.06	0	475,007	0.70	1	1	New
Democratic Choice of Russia – United Democrats	2,674,084	3.94	0	1,819,330	2.69	9	9	–53
Agrarian Party of Russia	2,613,127	3.85	0	4,066,214	6.02	20	20	–18
Derzhava	1,781,233	2.62	0	420,860	0.62	0	0	New
Forward, Russia!	1,343,428	1.98	0	1,054,577	1.56	3	3	New
Power to the People	1,112,873	1.64	0	1,345,905	1.99	9	9	New
Pamfilova–Gurov–Lysenko	1,106,812	1.63	0	476,721	0.71	2	2	New
Trade Unions and Industrialists – Union of Labour	1,076,072	1.59	0	584,063	0.86	1	1	New
Environmental Party of Russia "Kedr"	962,195	1.42	0	304,896	0.45	0	0	0
Ivan Rybkin Bloc	769,259	1.13	0	1,073,580	1.59	3	3	New
Stanislav Govorukhin Bloc	688,496	1.01	0	483,281	0.72	1	1	New
My Fatherland	496,276	0.73	0	351,911	0.52	1	1	New
Common Cause	472,615	0.70	0	148,584	0.22	1	1	New
Beer Lovers Party	428,727	0.63	0	57,946	0.09	0	0	New
All Russian Muslim Public Movement "Nur"	393,513	0.58	0	49,689	0.07	0	0	New
Transformation of the Fatherland	339,654	0.50	0	227,822	0.34	1	1	New
National Republican Party	331,700	0.49	0	27,197	0.04	0	0	New
Block of Djuna	323,232	0.48	0				0	New
Party of Russian Unity and Accord	245,977	0.36	0	285,654	0.42	1	1	–21
Russian Lawyers' Association	242,966	0.36	0	96,046	0.14	0	0	New
For the Motherland!	194,254	0.29	0	213,723	0.32	0	0	New
Christian-Democratic Union – Christians of Russia	191,446	0.28	0	102,335	0.15	0	0	New
Cause of Peter the First	145,704	0.21	0	51,928	0.08	0	0	New
People's Union	130,728	0.19	0	70,685	0.10	0	0	New
Tikhonov–Tupolev–Tikhonov Bloc	102,039	0.15	0	65,458	0.10	0	0	New
Russian Union of Workers of ZhKKh	97,274	0.14	0	115,386	0.17	0	0	New
Social Democrats	88,642	0.13	0	233,269	0.35	0	0	New
Party of Economic Freedom	88,416	0.13	0	199,150	0.29	1	1	New
Russian All-People's Movement	86,422	0.13	0	224,779	0.33	0	0	New
Bloc of Independents	83,742	0.12	0	375,287	0.56	1	1	New
Federal Democratic Movement	82,948	0.12	0	86,519	0.13	0	0	New
Sociopolitical Movement "Stable Russia"	81,285	0.12	0	159,226	0.24	0	0	New
Duma-96	55,897	0.08	0	108,672	0.16	0	0	New
Frontier Generations	44,202	0.07	0	13,429	0.02	0	0	New
Bloc '89	40,840	0.06	0	175,459	0.26	1	1	New
Interethnic Union	39,592	0.06	0	169,746	0.25	0	0	New
All-Russian Sociopolitical Movement of Transport Workers				162,263	0.24	0	0	New
Democratic Russia and Free Trade-Unions				158,040	0.23	0	0	New
Education is Russia's Future				129,399	0.19	0	0	New
Union of Patriots				118,441	0.18	0	0	New
Union of Russian Moslems				65,688	0.10	0	0	New
Party "Union of Communists"				62,181	0.09	0	0	New
Party of Supporters of Tax Reduction				61,519	0.09	0	0	New
Party "Democratic Alternative"				61,252	0.09	0	0	New
Conservative Party				57,351	0.08	0	0	New
Russian Party				43,221	0.06	0	0	New
Zemsky Sobor – Union of Zemstvo, Cossacks and Patriotic Orthodox Organisations				42,269	0.06	0	0	New
Party "Economic Alternative"				37,622	0.06	0	0	New
We are Serving for Russia!				35,535	0.05	0	0	New
League of Independent Scientists				28,666	0.04	0	0	New
Social Alliance "Revival"				27,032	0.04	0	0	New
Russian Union of Local Self-Government				21,427	0.03	0	0	New
Our Future				18,488	0.03	0	0	New
Faith, Labour, Conscience				14,639	0.02	0	0	New
Russian Party of Car Owners				8,088	0.01	0	0	New
People's Salvation Front				1,881	0.00	0	0	New
Workers' Collectives and Greens for the Union of Co-Owners				1,442	0.00	0	0	New
European Liberal Democratic Party				154	0.00	0	0	New
Independents				21,620,835	31.99	77	77	–58
Against all	1,918,151	2.83	–	6,660,495	9.85	–	–	–
Total	67,884,200	100.00	225	67,585,707	100.00	225	450	0
Valid votes	67,884,200	98.09		67,585,707	97.71			
Invalid/blank votes	1,320,619	1.91		1,582,227	2.29			
Total votes	69,204,819	100.00		69,167,934	100.00			
Registered voters/turnout	107,496,856	64.38		107,496,856	64.34			
Source: University of Essex, Nohlen & Stöver

== Parliamentary groups ==
Parliamentary group	Leader	Seats (Jan.'96)
Communist Party of the Russian Federation	Gennady Zyuganov	139
Our Home – Russia	Sergey Belyaev	65
Liberal Democratic Party of Russia	Vladimir Zhirinovsky	49
Yabloko	Grigory Yavlinsky	45
"Regions of Russia (Independent Deputies)"	Oleg Morozov	44
People's Power (Narodovlastie)	Nikolai Ryzhkov	41
Agrarian Group	Nikolay Kharitonov	35
Democratic Choice of Russia (unregistered)	Sergey Yushenkov	6
Independents		19
Total		450

== Sources ==
- Belin, Laura; Orttung, Robert W. (1997). The Russian Parliamentary Elections of 1995: The Battle for the Duma. ISBN 978-0765600844.
- Hale, Henry E. (2006). Why Not Parties in Russia?: Democracy, Federalism, and the State. New York: Cambridge University Press. ISBN 978-0521844093.
- McFaul, Michael (2001). Russia's Unfinished Revolution: Political Change from Gorbachev to Putin. Cornell University Press. ISBN 978-0801488146.
- Nohlen, Dieter; Stöver, Philip (2010). Elections in Europe: A data handbook. ISBN 978-3-8329-5609-7.
