= Administrative divisions of Ingushetia =

Administrative divisions of Russian federal subject

Republic of Ingushetia Russia
- Administrative centre: Magas

Administrative structure (as of 2010)
- Districts: 4
- Cities/towns: 5
- Urban-type settlements: 0
- Selsovets: 32

Municipal structure (as of 2002)
- Rural settlements: 41 (inhabited)

Ingushetia is a federal subject of Russia.

== Administrative and municipal divisions ==
- Cities under republic's jurisdiction (as of 2010):
  - Magas (Магас) (capital)
  - Nazran (Назрань)
  - Malgobek (Малгобек)
  - Karabulak (Карабулак)
  - Sunzha (Сунжа)
- Districts:
  - Dzheyrakhsky (Джейрахский)
  - Sunzhensky (Сунженский)
  - Nazranovsky (Назрановский)
  - Malgobeksky (Малгобекский)

The administrative divisions of Ingushetia

== Local self-government ==
Due to problems of defining the border between Chechnya and Ingushetia, as well as those related to the military operations in the region (First and Second Chechen Wars), both republics have not established a system of local self-government until 2009.
