= Muslim Tatriev =

Russian politician

- Муслим Татриев
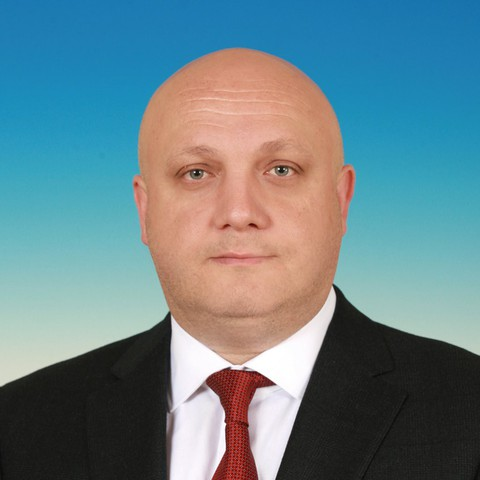
- official portrait, circa 2021

Member of the State Duma
- Incumbent
- Assumed office 12 October 2021
- Preceded by: Alikhan Kharsiyev
- Constituency: Ingushetia-at-large (No. 13)

Personal details
- Born: 11 January 1980 (age 46) Grozny, Checheno-Ingush ASSR, RSFSR, USSR
- Party: United Russia
- Education: Ingush State University

Muslim Barisovich Tatriev (Russian: Муслим Барисович Татриев; born 11 January 1980) is a Russian politician and law enforcement officer serving as a deputy of the State Duma.

Tatriev obtained a position in the law enforcement. Later, he engaged in business. From March 2020 to September 2021, he was the executive director at the RN Ingushneft. He left the post to become the deputy of the 8th State Duma.

== Sanctions ==
He was sanctioned by the UK government in 2022 in relation to the Russo-Ukrainian War.
