= Muzhichi =

Rural locality in Ingushetia

Muzhichi Мужичи
- Selo

Other transcription(s)
  - Ingush: Мужече
- Interactive map of Muzhichi
- Location of Muzhichi Muzhichi (Republic of Ingushetia)
- Coordinates: 43°01′36″N 44°59′41″E
- Country: Russia
- Federal subject: Ingushetia
- Founded: 1865

Population (2010 Census)
  - Total: 2,000
  - Estimate (2021): 2,386 (+19.3%)

Administrative status
  - Subordinated to: Sunzhensky District
- Time zone: UTC+3 (MSK)
- Postal code: 386243
- OKTMO ID: 26610430101

Muzhichi (Ingush: Мужече, Mužeče) is a rural locality (a selo) in Sunzhensky District of the Republic of Ingushetia, Russia, located on the left bank of the Sunzha River near the border with the Republic of North Ossetia–Alania. It forms the municipality of the rural settlement of Muzhichi as the only settlement in its composition.

== Geography ==
Muzhichi on the map of Sunzhensky (Ingush) otdel in 1892]] The village is located on the left bank of the river Assa, 37 km southwest of the district center - the city of Sunzha and 40 km southeast of the city of Magas.

The nearest settlements: in the north - the village of Galashki, in the east - the village of Dattykh and in the west - the village of Komgaron.

== History ==
The aul is named after the ancestor of the taip Muzhakhoy - Muzhkho. And the name of the village of Muzhichi (Ingush: Мужече) in translation means "aul Muzhakhoy".

In 1859, the Orstkhoys were evicted from the village of Muzhichi. In 1860–1861, Cossack villages were founded on the site of the former Orstkhoy mountain villages, including the farm - Muzhichinskiy, but the constant attacks of the Ingush forced the inhabitants of the farm to go north, under the cover of the "Sunzhenskaya Cossack Line".

In 1872, the farm was settled by highlanders among 300 households from the Khamkhin and Tsorin societies, at the head of the settlers was Ozig Kotiev Meili-Khadzhi Espievich, a native of the Galgai village, who rented land from the tsarist administration and actually restored and revived the ancient village. At one time he served in the Sunzha regiment and had good relations with the authorities of the Terek region. Over the course of several decades, the village was settled by new settlers from the Khamkhin society, and already at the beginning of the 20th century, about a hundred households lived in Muzhichi. Among the first settlers were the Kotievs, Barkinkhoevs, Bogatyrevs, Aushevs, Gandarovs, Kostoevs, Balaevs, Dalakovs, Khakievs, Gaitukievs and others.

Since 1940, the museum of Sergo Ordzhonikidze has been functioning in the village, who in 1919 hid here for several months. The museum also contains exhibits from the excavations of the well-known in the scientific world "Meadow burial ground" of the 1st millennium BC. e. - the center of the "Koban culture" of the Bronze Age.

From 1944 to 1958, during the period of the deportation of Chechens and Ingush, and the abolition of the Chechen-Ingush Autonomous Soviet Socialist Republic, the village was called Lugovoe.

Historical places of ancient Ingush history are concentrated on the territory of the village: the valley of BIu-latt-Are (“valley of the army gathering”); the peak of Kh'-kholge ("Place of guards"); the castle peaks Ir-Buro-Kort (“Sharp peak of the fortress”), Yi'syana-Buro-Kort (“quadrangular peak of the fortress”); Sai-viin-duk ridge (“The ridge where Sai fell”); barrow Amash-gu; barrow ridge Boarz-duk (“ridge of grave hills”); glade Malkha-ardash (“sunny allotments”); the heights of Ha-kerte (“top of the guard”) and Tov-zen-kort (“top shown for observation”), etc.

== Taïps ==
Taïp composition of the village:

- Egakhoy (Aushev, Bogatyrovs, Gandarovs)
- Barkinkhoy (Barkinkhoevs, Dalievs, Kotievs
- Khoakhoy (Balaevs)
- Tskhoroy (Bisaevs)

== Infrastructure ==
The village has a secondary school, a library and other social and cultural institutions.

== Bibliography ==
- Мальсагов, З. К. (1963). Оздоева, Ф. (ed.). Грамматика ингушского языка [Grammar of the Ingush language] (in Ingush and Russian). Vol. 5 (2nd ed.). Грозный: Чечено-Ингушское Книжное Издательство. pp. 1–164.
- Оздоев, И. А. (1980). Оздоева, Ф. Г.; Куркиев, А. С. (eds.). Русско-ингушский словарь: 40 000 слов [Russian-Ingush dictionary: 40,000 words] (in Ingush and Russian). Москва: Русский язык. pp. 1–832.
- Барахоева, Н. М.; Кодзоев, Н. Д.; Хайров, Б. А. (2016). Ингушско-русский словарь терминов [Ingush-Russian dictionary of terms] (in Ingush and Russian) (2 ed.). Нальчик: ООО «Тетраграф». pp. 1–288.
- Кодзоев, Н. Д. (2021). Хайрова, Р. Р. (ed.). Русско-ингушский словарь [Russian-Ingush dictionary] (in Ingush and Russian). Ростов-на-Дону: Типография «Лаки Пак». pp. 1–656. ISBN 978-5-906785-55-8.
