= Mikhail Ilezov =

Russian politician (born 1979)

- Михаил Илезов
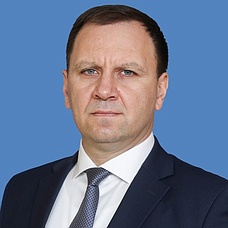

Senator from Ingushetia
- Incumbent
- Assumed office 9 September 2024
- Preceded by: Mukharbek Barakhoyev

Personal details
- Born: 25 December 1979 (age 46) Galashki, Checheno-Ingush Autonomous Soviet Socialist Republic, Soviet Union
- Party: United Russia
- Education: Moscow State Forest University
- Awards: Medal of the Order "For Merit to the Fatherland"

Mikhail Bangirovich Ilezov (Russian: Михаил Бангирович Илезов; born December 25, 1979, Galashki, Chechen-Ingush ASSR) is a Russian politician, senator of the Russian Federation from the executive branch of the Republic of Ingushetia (since 2024). He joined the Federation Council Committee on Budget and Financial Markets.

== Biography ==
Born December 25, 1979 in the village of Galashki, Chechen-Ingush ASSR.

In 2003, he graduated from the Moscow State Forest University with a degree in Economics and Management at the Enterprise.

In 2006, he received a second higher education in jurisprudence, defended his PhD dissertation and received a PhD in Law.

In June 2015, he began worked Russian Post as the head of the Housing and Public Utilities Department.

On September 9, 2024, the head of Ingushetia, Mahmud-Ali Kalimatov, appointed Mikhail Ilezov, a senator of the Federation Council as a representative of the executive branch of the region. On September 25, 2024, he joined the Federation Council Committee on Budget and Financial Markets.

He was awarded the medal of the Order of Merit for the Fatherland, 2nd degree.
