= Beer Lovers Party (Russia) =

Beer Lovers Party Партия любителей пива
- Abbreviation: PLP (English); ПЛП (Russian)
- Chairperson: Dmitry Shestakov
- Secretary-General: Konstantin Kalachev
- Founded: Historical: December 25, 1993; Modern: May 22, 2024
- Dissolved: 1998
- Headquarters: 7/2nd Building, Tverskoy Boulevard, Moscow, Russia. 103104
- Membership (1995): 50,000
- Ideology: Joke party Patriotism; Protectionism; Environmentalism; Anti-establishment
- Political position: Big tent
- Colours: Yellow; Orange
- Slogan: "Not the worst party. An outstanding party! A party that stands out from the rest." (Russian: "Не самая плохая партия. Отличная партия! Партия, отличная от всех.")

Website
- Historical: plp-vrn.narod.ru Modern: plp-party.ru (archived)

The Beer Lovers Party (PLP; Russian: Партия любителей пива; ПЛП; Partiya lyubiteley piva, PLP) was created in Russia on December 26, 1993, and officially registered on August 9, 1994. By the moment of registration the party listed 1,700 members.

In 2024 the party has been restored on the restoration congress in Moscow hosted in Vkusandze restaurant.

== History ==
Initially it was a kind of practical joke, supposedly created in an analogy with the Polish Beer-Lovers Party. Its documents read as a parody on political cliches in party programmes. For example, its goal was "protection of interests of beer lovers regardless of racial, national, or religious affiliation". Among demands was decrease of taxes for beer manufacturers. It has fractions of "light beer lovers", "dark beer lovers", "kvass patriot fraction", etc.

It was supported by a number of Russian entrepreneurs in the context of 1995 Russian legislative election, and its documents were rewritten into a more serious style. Among its goals now was the "protection of interests of beer lovers that do not contradict the law". The party now stood for "efficient means for preservation of main natural resources, such as land, air, and especially water, which is the basis of a good beer". Among its official slogans were "Replete and Safe Life" ("Сытая и безопасная жизнь") and "Clever and Calm Politicians Grasping not only Beer". Its platform stated that the Party "will defend interests not only beer lovers, but also lovers of sausage, butter, meat, tea, kvass and other lovers, with the exception of lovers of power". It was branched into about 60 regions of Russia, the largest ones being in Moscow, Komi Republic, Chuvashia, Irkutsk Oblast, Saratov Oblast and Moscow Oblast. By the moment of elections it enlisted over 50,000 members. During the election into the State Duma (second convocation) it gained 0.62% of votes, way below the 5% election threshold. Vladimir Pribylovsky was among the candidates nominated by the party.

After the failure, the sponsors dropped their support and the party de facto ceased to exist and was not re-registered in 1998. Still, many branches of the Party continue to exist as formal and informal associations.

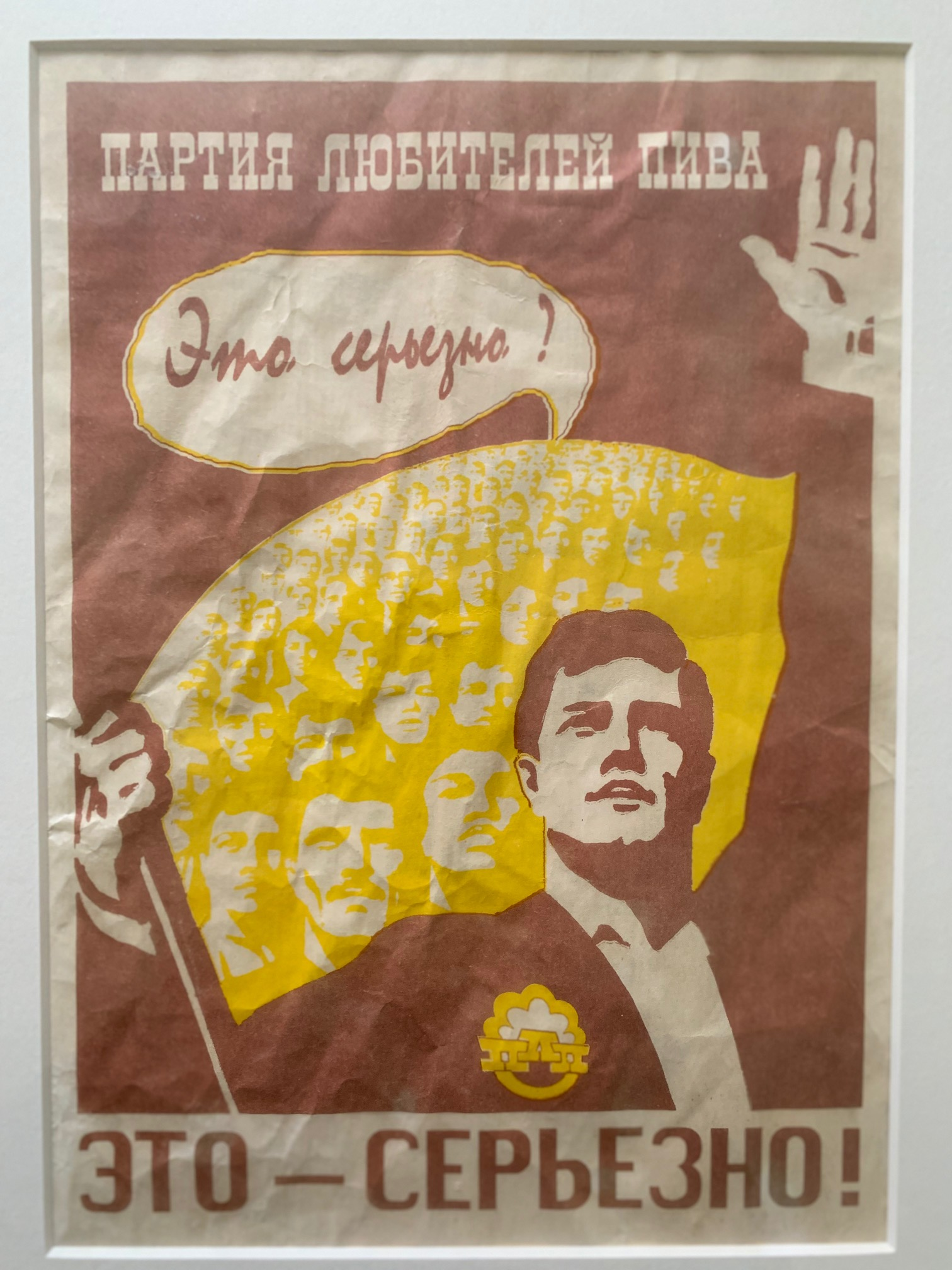
Campaign placard for Beer Lover's Party, Russia: "Is it serious? It's serious!" posted around Moscow, December 1997

== Sponsors and finance ==
- Промрадтехбанк - Promradtechbank;
- АО "Управление перспективных технологий" - "Promising Technology Management";
- КБ "Платина" - Platina;
- ТОО Фирма "Русич" - Rusich;
- ТОО "Артиль" - Artil;
- АООТ "Телекомпания ВКТ" - VKT Television;
- МАКБ "Возрождение" - Rebirth Bank;
- ООО "Корпорация НР-Телеком" - NR Telecom Corporation;
- ТОО "Финтраст" - FinTrust;
- АКБ "МБТС-Банк" - MBTS Bank;
- АО "Московская телекоммуникационная корпорация" - Moscow Telecommunications Corporation.

Total donation by sponsors: 697,300,000 rubles (1995). 115 million was allocated by the Central Election Commission. About 777 million was supplied by individuals and companies. In total, the party had spent about 1.07 billion rubles for the election campaign.

== See also ==
- List of frivolous political parties
