= Zarifa Sautieva =

Ingush museum director and political activist

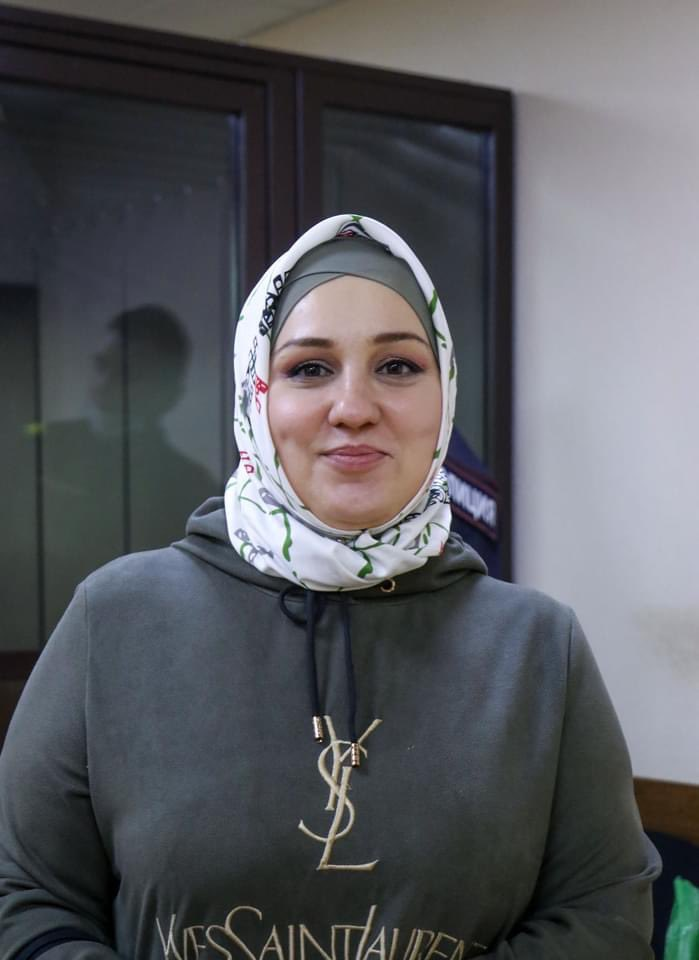
- Zarifa Sautieva in 2021
- Born: 1 May 1978 (age 48)
- Employer(s): Memorial for Memory & Glory
- Organization: Ingush Committee for National Unity

Zarifa Mukharbekovna Sautieva (Note: Russian: Зарифа Мухарбековна Саутиева, Ingush: Совтанаькъан Мухарбика Зарифа, romanized: Sovtanäqhan Mukharbika Zarifa.) (born 1 May 1978) is a museum director and political activist from Ingushetia. She was dismissed by the Russian government because of her protests about changes to the border between Chechnya and Ingushetia, and subsequently imprisoned.

== Biography ==
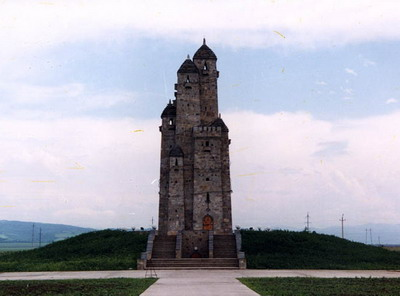
Memorial-Nazran, where Sautieva worked prior to her dismissal

Sautieva was born on 1 May 1978. During her childhood, she loved to read. Her family includes two sisters and one brother. She has a university degree and lived in Sunzha in the Republic of Ingushetia. She is a member of the Ingush Committee of National Unity. Until November 2018, she was deputy director of the Memorial of Memory and Glory in Nazran, Ingushetia. She was particularly gifted in her museum work at community engagement. She was dismissed by the Russian government from her post in response to her involvement in protests against changes to the border between Chechnya and Ingushetia.

== Activism ==
Sautieva was arrested on 27 March 2019 in Magas by police, following clashes with protesters. It is alleged that the protesters threw sticks, chairs, and fences at police after attempts were made to disperse the protest. Although Sautieva used social media to record protests, recordings from March 2019 show her calling other protesters to order.

Sautieva was one of 33 people detained in response to their role in the protests against the border. She is the only woman to have been detained. She has been held in custody since 12 July 2019. She has been detained at a centre in Nalchik in Kabardino-Balkaria. She has claimed that while in detention, she and other protesters have been victims of psychological torture and physical violence. When asked to give a handwriting sample during detention, she wrote out a poem by Osip Mandelstam.

On 15–16 January 2020, Sautieva and other protesters were charged with participation in an extremist community. On 26 January, a complaint was filed by lawyers from the Human Rights Centre in Ingushetia with the European Court of Human Rights regarding the conviction. On 27 March, an open letter signed by over 170 people called for her release. This campaign was initiated by fellow activist Leyla Gazdiyeva. As of March 2020, her trial was due to take place in private, and her family were barred from visiting her. The Council of Europe regards her, and her fellow activists, as political prisoners held by the state.
