= Larisa Babukh =

Soviet-Russian research engineer and educator

Larisa Babukh Лариса Бабух
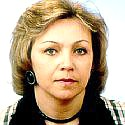
- 1993
- Born: Larisa Vladimirovna Babukh; Лариса Владимировна Бабух; 13 August 1949 (age 77); Gvardeysk, Kaliningrad Oblast (before 1945 East Prussia), Soviet Union
- Education: MIREA, Moscow
- Occupations: Engineer educator politician member of the State Duma
- Political party: 1. "Женщины России" ("Women of Russia"); 2. "Партия социальной справедливости"("Social Justice Party")

Larisa Babukh is a Soviet-Russian research engineer and educator who found her way into national politics during the aftermath of the 1991 upheavals. She sat as a member of the State Duma between 1993 and 1995, representing the "Женщины России" ("Women of Russia" grouping). In 1995 she emerged as a leader of the "Образование — будущее России" ("Education – Russia's Future") quasi-party. Attempts to have the new movement registered for participation in the 1995 Duma elections did not succeed due to a failure to obtain sufficient signatures on the nomination submission. She subsequently worked as a senior education administrator. Her attempts to secure re-election to the State Duma were unsuccessful. In 2006 she became a co-chair of the short-lived "Партия социальной справедливости"("Social Justice Party").

== Biographical ==
Larisa Vladimirovna Babukh was born at Gvardeysk, a small town and administrative centre in the heart of the newly resettled and renamed Kaliningrad Oblast. She received a higher technical education leading, in 1974, to a degree in radio engineering at the Moscow State Institute of Radio-engineering Electronics and Automation (MIREA).

Between 1969 and 1976 Larisa Vladimirovna worked as a radio equipment design engineer at the Voronezh-based Semiconductor Research Institute of the Soviet Academy of Sciences. For the next eight years she worked in Moscow as a teacher of technical drawing at Specialist School No. 33. She moved on in 1984 to the Moscow Technical College (as it was then known) where for the next six years she taught Telemechanics and Automation.

During 1990/91 she worked as Deputy CEO for "Перспектика Крономарк", a short-lived Soviet-Italian joint venture. She was then employed between 1991 and 1993 as General Director at "Ларина-сервис", a Moscow-based joint-stock company involved in servicing and repairing electric appliances.

In Russian legislative election December 1993 Larisa Babukh was elected as a deputy to the State Duma. She was one of 23 members representing the "Women of Russia" ("Женщины России" / ZhR grouping) in the Duma during the ensuing 24 months. She served as a member of the Duma committee on Education, Arts and Sciences. Most of the more prominent "Women of Russia" ("Женщины России") leaders had connections to the teaching profession

In 1995 she teamed up with Lyubov Kezina and Maria Lazutova to become a co-founder of "Образование — будущее России" ("Education – Russia's Future"), which was intended to become a single-issue political party. It is variously characterised as a "social and political organisation" or as an "education lobby group". Babukh and her comrades presented it as a reaction to major reductions in government spending on the education sector during the first half of the 1990s. In the words of a prominent backer, the Russian education system needed not so much reforming as financing. Between 1992 and 1996, supporters asserted, the number of Kindergartens in Russia had fallen by a quarter. "If we depend only on the money budgeted centrally and by state level government, in the very near future we will need to close a third of the universities, half of the technical and vocational colleges, and halve the amount of teaching in the schools". Larisa Vladimirovna was upbeat, confident that the quasi-party could secure 5% of the national vote at the forthcoming election, thereby crossing the threshold necessary to secure seats in the State Duma: "Everyone is touched by education, so it stands to reason that everyone wants it to be better funded". (Note: "Ведь, казалось бы, за него проголосуют все, кто имеет хотя бы какое-то отношение к образованию, а значит, хочет, чтобы оно финансировалось лучше".) In the event her confidence was never tested with voters, since the movement failed even to secure a listing on the ballot paper. Those who had founded the movement nevertheless remained in touch with one another, despite a split within it in 1996.

In 1996 Babukh accepted an appointment as a Head of Department (Education) at the Moscow-based "International Academy of Informatization".

In 2002 Larisa Babukh was one of several formerly active members of "Образование — будущее России" ("Education – Russia's Future") who together created the "Партия социальной справедливости" ("Social Justice Party"), of which she herself became one of the co-chairs. was one of the parties that merged in 2008 to form the "Справедливая Россия" ("Just Russia") party.

== Personal ==
Larisa Babukh is married with two sons.
