= Karabulak, Republic of Ingushetia =

Town in the Republic of Ingushetia, Russia

Karabulak Карабулак
- Town

Other transcription(s)
  - Ingush: Илдарха-Гӏала (Note: • Commonly mentioned in Ingush sources as 'Ildarkha-Ghala' (Ingush: Илдарха-Гӏала), however some sources mention the village as 'Karabulak' (Ingush: Карабулак) or 'Ildarkha-Phe' (Ingush: Илдара-Пхье).)
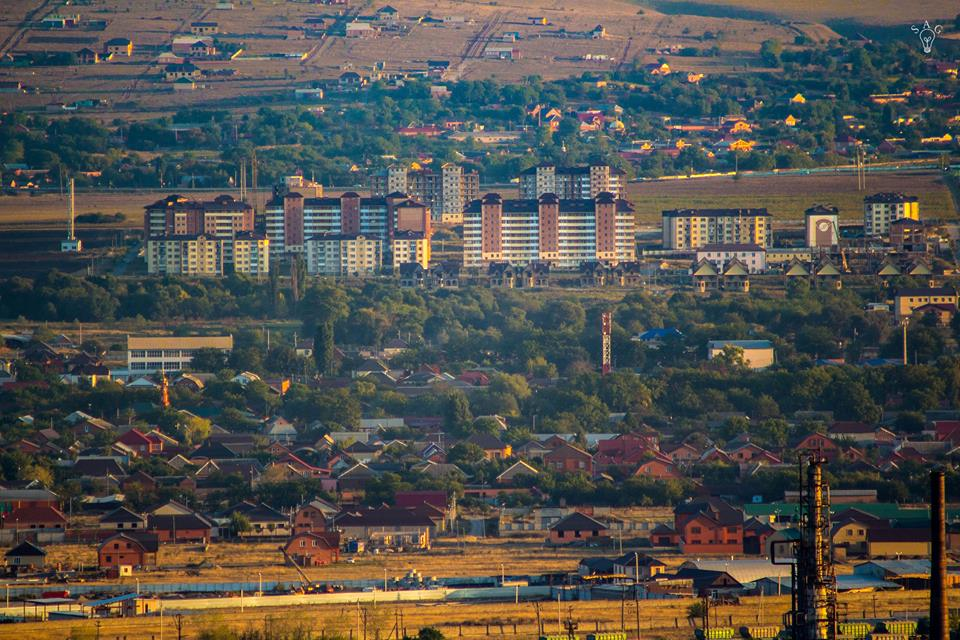
- View of Karabulak

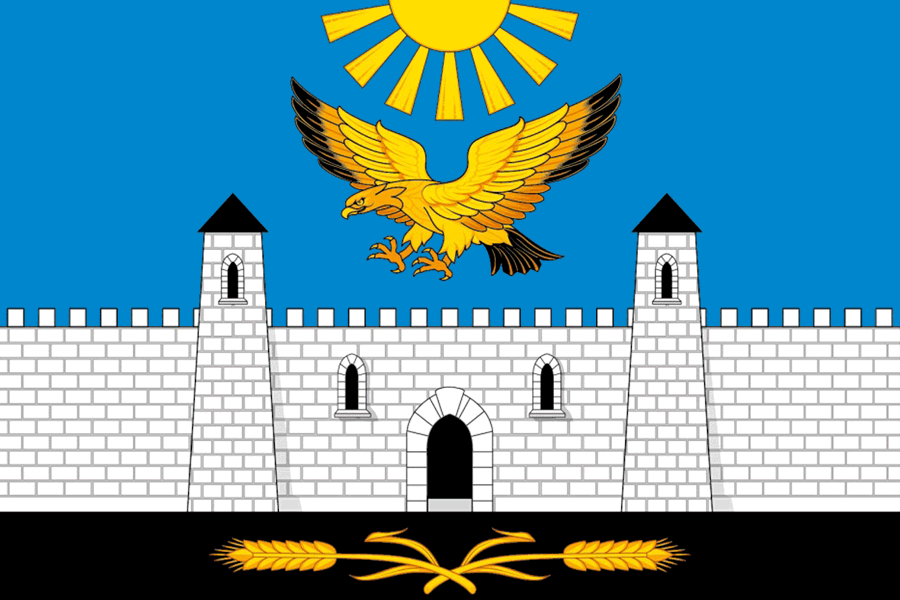
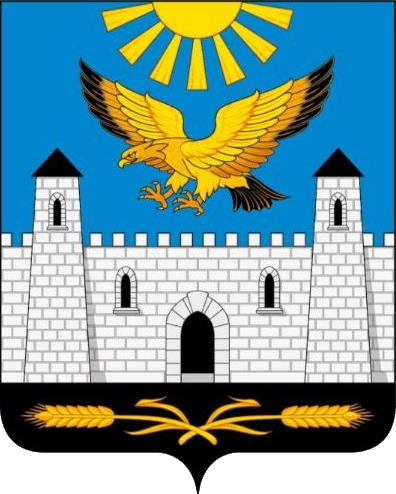
- Flag Coat of arms
- Interactive map of Karabulak
- Location of Karabulak Karabulak (Republic of Ingushetia)
- Coordinates: 43°19′N 44°55′E
- Country: Russia
- Federal subject: Ingushetia
- Founded: 1859
- Town status since: 1995
- Elevation: 420 m (1,380 ft)

Population (2010 Census)
  - Total: 30,961
  - Estimate (2024): 44,323 (+43.2%)

Administrative status
  - Subordinated to: town of republic significance of Karabulak
  - Capital of: town of republic significance of Karabulak

Municipal status
  - Urban okrug: Karabulak Urban Okrug
  - Capital of: Karabulak Urban Okrug
- Time zone: UTC+3 (MSK)
- Postal code: 386230
- OKTMO ID: 26710000001
- Website: mokarabulak.ru

Karabulak population
- 2010 Census: 30,961
- 2002 Census: 31,279
- 1989 Census: 9,354
- 1979 Census: 8,779

Karabulak (Russian: Карабула́к; Ingush: Илдарха-Гӏала) is a town in the Republic of Ingushetia, Russia, located on the Sunzha River (a tributary of the Terek), 20 kilometers (12 mi) north of the republic's capital of Magas. As of the 2010 Census, its population was 30,961.

== History ==
The Cossack stanitsa of Karabulakskaya (Карабулакская) was founded in 1859. Urban-type settlement status was granted to it in 1962 and town status was granted in 1995.

In the 1990s, the town's population more than tripled, because of an influx of refugees from neighboring Chechnya.

== Administrative and municipal status ==
Within the framework of administrative divisions, it is incorporated as the town of republic significance of Karabulak—an administrative unit with the status equal to that of the districts. As a municipal division, the town of republic significance of Karabulak is incorporated as Karabulak Urban Okrug.

== Economy ==
A chemical factory is located in Karabulak.

== Geography ==
=== Climate ===
Karabulak has a humid continental climate (Köppen climate classification: Dfa).

Climate data for Karabulak
Month	Jan	Feb	Mar	Apr	May	Jun	Jul	Aug	Sep	Oct	Nov	Dec	Year
Mean daily maximum °C (°F)	0.5 (32.9)	2.1 (35.8)	7.6 (45.7)	16.0 (60.8)	22.0 (71.6)	25.9 (78.6)	28.2 (82.8)	27.7 (81.9)	22.5 (72.5)	15.8 (60.4)	8.2 (46.8)	2.9 (37.2)	15.0 (58.9)
Daily mean °C (°F)	−3.3 (26.1)	−2.1 (28.2)	3.0 (37.4)	9.9 (49.8)	15.8 (60.4)	19.7 (67.5)	22.1 (71.8)	21.5 (70.7)	16.5 (61.7)	10.5 (50.9)	4.2 (39.6)	−0.7 (30.7)	9.8 (49.6)
Mean daily minimum °C (°F)	−7.1 (19.2)	−6.2 (20.8)	−1.6 (29.1)	3.8 (38.8)	9.7 (49.5)	13.5 (56.3)	16.1 (61.0)	15.4 (59.7)	10.6 (51.1)	5.2 (41.4)	0.2 (32.4)	−4.2 (24.4)	4.6 (40.3)
Average precipitation mm (inches)	25 (1.0)	26 (1.0)	36 (1.4)	57 (2.2)	92 (3.6)	113 (4.4)	87 (3.4)	70 (2.8)	52 (2.0)	40 (1.6)	36 (1.4)	29 (1.1)	663 (25.9)

== Bibliography ==
- Ужахов, М.Г (1927). Ингушско-русский словарь (in Ingush and Russian). Владикавказ: Крайнациздат. pp. 1–185.
- БIархой, Нина; Коазой, Нурдин; Хайренаькъан, БайIаьла (2016). ГIалгIай-Эрсий Терминий Дошлорг (in Ingush and Russian). Магас. pp. 1–288.
- Оздоев, И. А. (1980). Русско-ингушский словарь: 40 000 слов (in Ingush and Russian). Москва: Русский язык. pp. 1–832.
- Кодзоев, Н.Д. (2021). Русско-ингушский словарь (in Ingush and Russian). Ростов-на-Дону. pp. 1–656. ISBN 978-5-906785-55-8.
