= Caucasus Krai =

Caucasus Krai (Russian: Кавказский край) was an administrative division (a krai) of the Russian Empire. It was established in 1844. From that time until 1882 the head of the region (krai) was Viceroy-namestnik (Russian: наместник), during 1882–1905 chief executive or commander-in-chief (Russian: главноуправляющий or главноначальствующий), and in 1905–1917 again namestnik.
