= Mikhail Simonov =

Russian aircraft designer (1929–2011)

- Михаил Симонов
- Born: 19 October 1929; Rostov-on-Don, Russian SFSR, Soviet Union
- Died: 4 March 2011 (aged 81); Moscow, Russia
- Known for: Sukhoi Su-27
- Awards: Hero of the Russian Federation
- Scientific career
- Fields: aircraft designer

Mikhail Petrovich Simonov (Russian: Михаи́л Петро́вич Си́монов; 19 October 1929 – 4 March 2011) was a Russian aircraft designer famed for creating the Sukhoi Su-27 fighter-bomber, the Soviet Union's answer to the American F-15 Eagle. After the dissolution of the Soviet Union in 1991, Simonov coordinated the Su-27's sale to foreign governments, providing badly needed hard currency to the Russian government. In recognition of his achievements, he was named a Hero of the Russian Federation in 1999.

Simonov was born in Rostov-on-Don. He became an aviation engineer in the 1950s and joined Sukhoi as a deputy chief designer in 1970. During his time at Sukhoi, he developed the Sukhoi Su-24 bomber and the Sukhoi Su-25 ground-attack aircraft, as well as the Su-27. He was the Soviet Union's deputy minister of aircraft industries from 1979 to 1983.

== See also ==
- List of Heroes of the Russian Federation
