= Sernovodsky =

Sernovodsky (Russian: Серново́дский; masculine), Sernovodskaya (Серново́дская; feminine), or Sernovodskoye (Серново́дское; neuter) is the name of several rural localities in Russia:

- Sernovodskoye, Chechen Republic, a selo in Sunzhensky District of the Chechen Republic
- Sernovodskoye, Stavropol Krai, a selo in Kursky District of Stavropol Krai
