= Valentin Dikul =

Russian circus artist

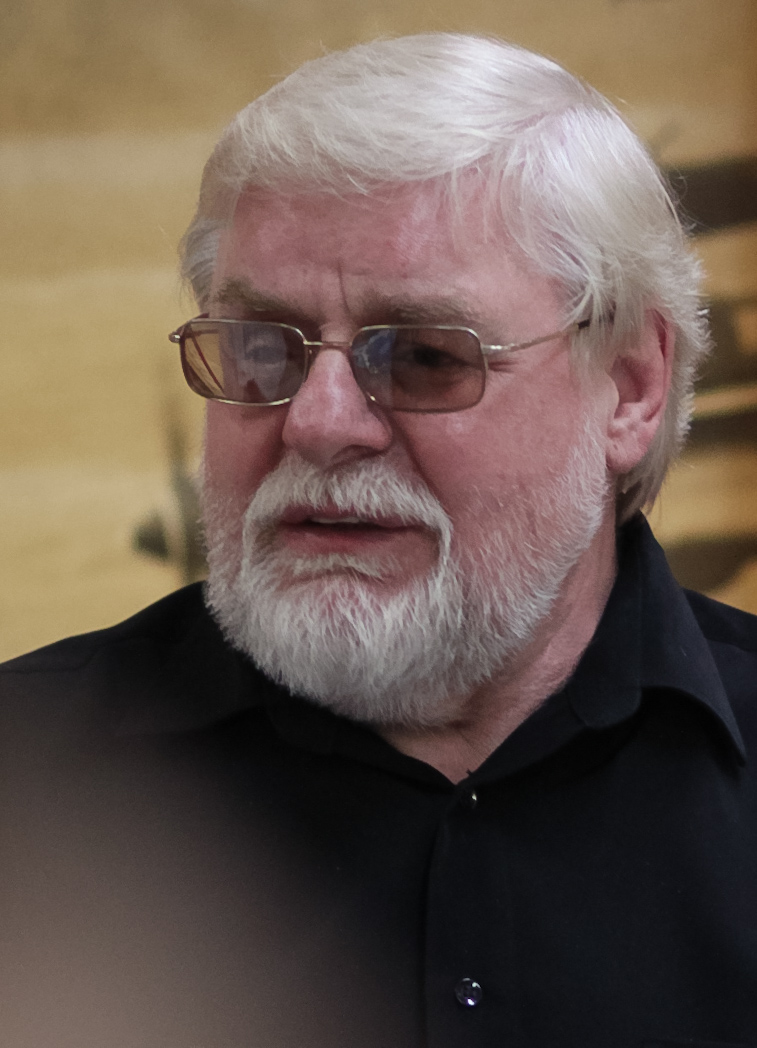
- Dikul in 2011
- Born: 3 April 1948 (age 78); Kaunas, Lithuanian SSR, Soviet Union
- Occupations: Circus strongman, rehabilitation specialist
- Known for: Dikul rehabilitation center
- Awards: People's Artist of Russia (1999)

Valentin Ivanovich Dikul (Russian: Валентин Иванович Дикуль; born 3 April 1948) is a Russian circus strongman and rehabilitation specialist. He is a People's Artist of Russia (1999) and the head of the Russian medical and rehabilitation center of the musculoskeletal system diseases.

== Biography ==
Dikul was born prematurely, weighing just over one kilogram. His father Ivan Grigoryevich (1920–1950) was Ukrainian by nationality and worked as a serviceman in the NKVD and its successor, the Ministry of Internal Affairs, but was killed in the line of duty. His mother Anna Korneyevna (1925–1952) was Russian by nationality, and died when Valentin was still in kindergarten. Dikul was raised by his grandparents until he was seven years old, when he began living in orphanages, first in Vilnius and then in Kaunas. Aged nine, he became interested in the circus and helped to put up the circus tent, cleaning the arena, looking after the animals, sweeping, and washing the floors. At fourteen he began working as a motorcycle repairman. In his free time he trained in gymnastics, wrestling, weightlifting, balancing acts, acrobatics, juggling, and stunts, and eventually became involved with the circus in Kaunas.

=== Injury ===
In 1962, when Valentin was almost fifteen, he starred in his first act of air gymnastics at the Sports Palace. The act was performed at an altitude of 13 meters. During one such performance, a steel support cross beam suddenly broke, and Valentin fell from 13 meters. He spent a week in intensive care at the City Hospital and was then transferred to the neurosurgery department of the hospital. His final diagnosis was a compression fracture of the lumbar spine and traumatic brain injury, with many local fractures.

=== Recovery ===
Dikul trained for 5–6 hours a day lifting objects, stretching rubber bands and performing push-ups; however, his legs did not work. Suffering from pain in the spine and fatigue, he performed strength exercises and studied the medical literature on the spine, gathering the necessary information. Doctors asked him to stop wasting time and effort, explaining that success is impossible. But he continued to exhaustion. He began to lift small weights at first, then more and more increasing the weight, developing all the muscles of the back which he was able to. Then he had the idea that you need to move the inactive parts of the body as if they were healthy a full cycle. He tied a rope to his feet, passing it under the headboard, which played the role of a pulley and then pulled it, moving the feet. Then he began using counterweight loads. Friends helped him build a system of weights and pulleys around his bed designed by Dikul. Eight months later he was discharged from the hospital with the first group of disability.

A series of publications in the press provoked an avalanche of letters to Dikul with requests for help. In response, he would send them a package of instructions designed for medical rehabilitation. In processing a large amount of correspondence he was helped by his wife Lyudmila.

Many people using a wheelchair saw it as their hope. Valentin spent three to four hours a day on advising people with disabilities.

In 1988, the Dikul center, a Russian rehabilitation center for patients with spinal injuries and with consequences of infantile cerebral paralysis, was opened.

Dikul was also known for his immense strength, which he displayed mostly in the form of juggling, flipping, and snatching massive kettlebells. He is known to have used kettlebells weighing up to 80–90 kg for the aforementioned movements.

== Criticism ==
In 2013, Dikul was criticised for allegedly falsifying results of heavylifting of a rock.
