= Sunzhensky District, Republic of Ingushetia =

Sunzhensky District Сунженский район (Russian)
- District

Other transcription(s)
  - Ingush: Шолжа шахьар
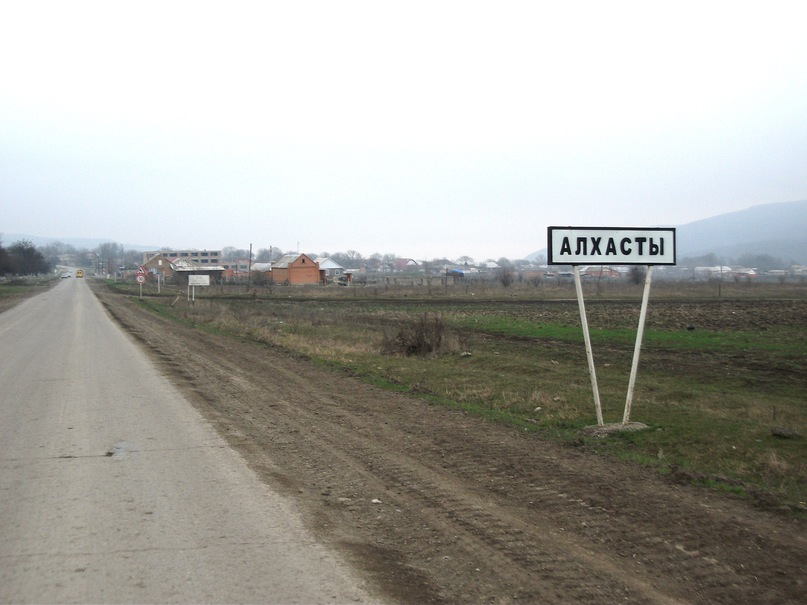
- Entrance to the selo of Alkhasty in Sunzhensky District

- Flag Coat of arms
- Location of Sunzhensky District in the Republic of Ingushetia
- Coordinates: 43°19′N 45°04′E
- Country: Russia
- Federal subject: Republic of Ingushetia
- Established: 4 June 1992
- Administrative center: Sunzha

Area
  - Total: 1,513 km^{2} (584 sq mi)

Population (2010 Census)
  - Total: 116,470
  - Density: 76.98/km^{2} (199.4/sq mi)
  - Urban: 0%
  - Rural: 100%

Administrative structure
  - Inhabited localities: 11 rural localities

Municipal structure
  - Municipally incorporated as: Sunzhensky Municipal District
  - Municipal divisions: 0 urban settlements, 11 rural settlements
- Time zone: UTC+3 (MSK)
- OKTMO ID: 26610000
- Website: http://sunja-ri.ru

Population of Sunzhensky District
- 2010 Census: 116,470
- 2002 Census: 119,826

Sunzhensky District (Russian: Сунженский райо́н; Ingush: Шолжа шахьар, Šolža šaꜧar) is an administrative and municipal district (raion), one of the four in the Republic of Ingushetia, Russia. It is made up of territory that was formerly part of the Sunzha Cossack Okrug . It is located in the eastern and central parts of the republic. The area of the district is 1,513 square kilometers (584 sq mi). Its administrative center is the town of Sunzha (called stanitsa Ordzhonikidzevskaya before 2016). As of the 2010 Census, the total population of the district was 116,470, with the population of Sunzha accounting for 52.9% of that number.

== Administrative and municipal status ==
Within the framework of administrative divisions, Sunzhensky District is one of the four in the Republic of Ingushetia and has administrative jurisdiction over all of its eleven rural localities. As a municipal division, the district is incorporated as Sunzhensky Municipal District. Its eleven rural localities are incorporated into eleven rural settlements within the municipal district. The stanitsa of Sunzha serves as the administrative center of both the administrative and municipal district.
