= Ingush State University =

University in Ingushetia

- Type: Public
- Established: 1994
- Rector: Arsamak Martazanov
- Academic staff: 508
- Students: 8978
- Location: 7 Zyazikova Avenue, Magas, Russian Federation; 43.1913°N 44.7500°E Building details
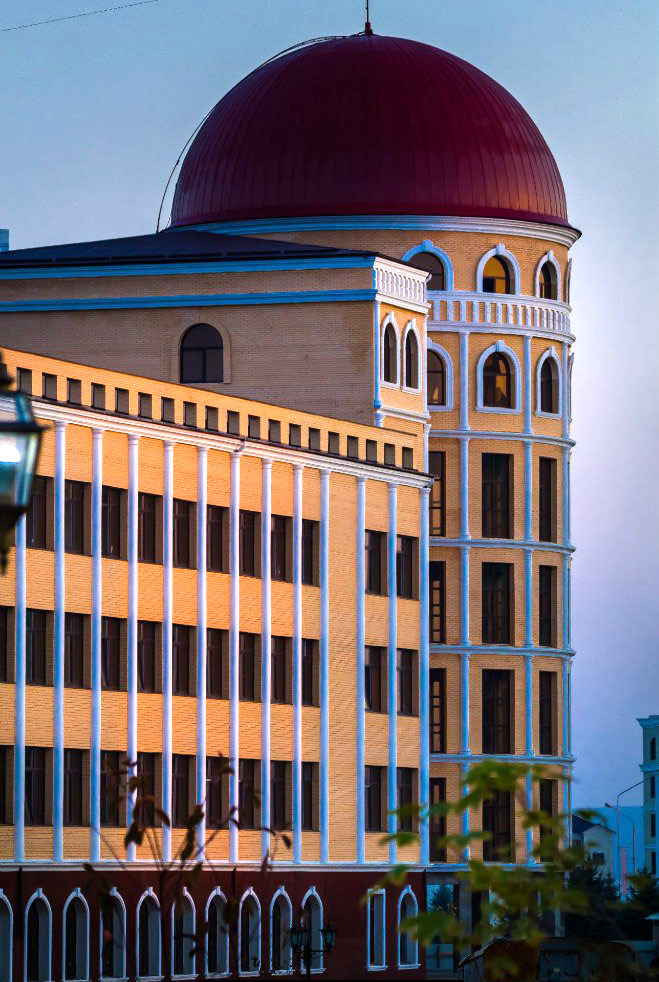
- Website: inggu.ru

Ingush State University (Note: Russian: Ингушский Государственный Университет, romanized: Ingushskiy Gosudarstvenny Universitet, abbreviated as IngGU, Ingush: ГӀалгӀай паччахьалкхен университет, romanized: Ghalghai pachchah'alqen universitet.) is a public university in Magas, Republic of Ingushetia. It was founded in 1994 and considered to be one of the youngest public universities in Russia. With 10 faculties and 42 academic departments, the university is the biggest higher education institution in the region.

== History ==
Shortly after a partition of Chechen-Ingush ASSR and establishment the Republic of Ingushetia on 4 June 1992, the newly (re)created federal region was in urge of founding new higher education institution, which would gradually become the main university of the republic. In April 1994, a governmental decree issued by the Government of Russia established the Ingush State University, founded by State Committee for Higher Education. The university started functioning in September 1994.

== Faculties ==
- Faculty of Philology
- Faculty of Economics
- Faculty of Economics and Finance
- Faculty of Law
- Faculty of History
- Faculty of Medicine
- Faculty Chemistry and Biology
- Faculty of Physics and Mathematics
- Faculty of Agricultural Engineering
- Faculty of Pedagogy

== Academic cooperation ==
Ingush State University collaborates with numerous Russian and international higher education institutions and research centers, such as:

- Moscow State University
- Herzen University
- Financial University under the Government of the Russian Federation
- Pyatigorsk State Linguistic University
- Tyumen State University
- Max Planck Institute for Evolutionary Anthropology (Leipzig, Germany)
- University of Dresden
- California University of Contemporary Anthropology
- Kazakhstan State endowment "Parasat"

== Bibliography ==
- "Факультеты" [Faculties]. www.inggu.ru (in Russian).
