= Sunzha =

Town in the Republic of Ingushetia, Russia

Sunzha Сунжа
- Town

Other transcription(s)
  - Ingush: Шолжа-Пхье
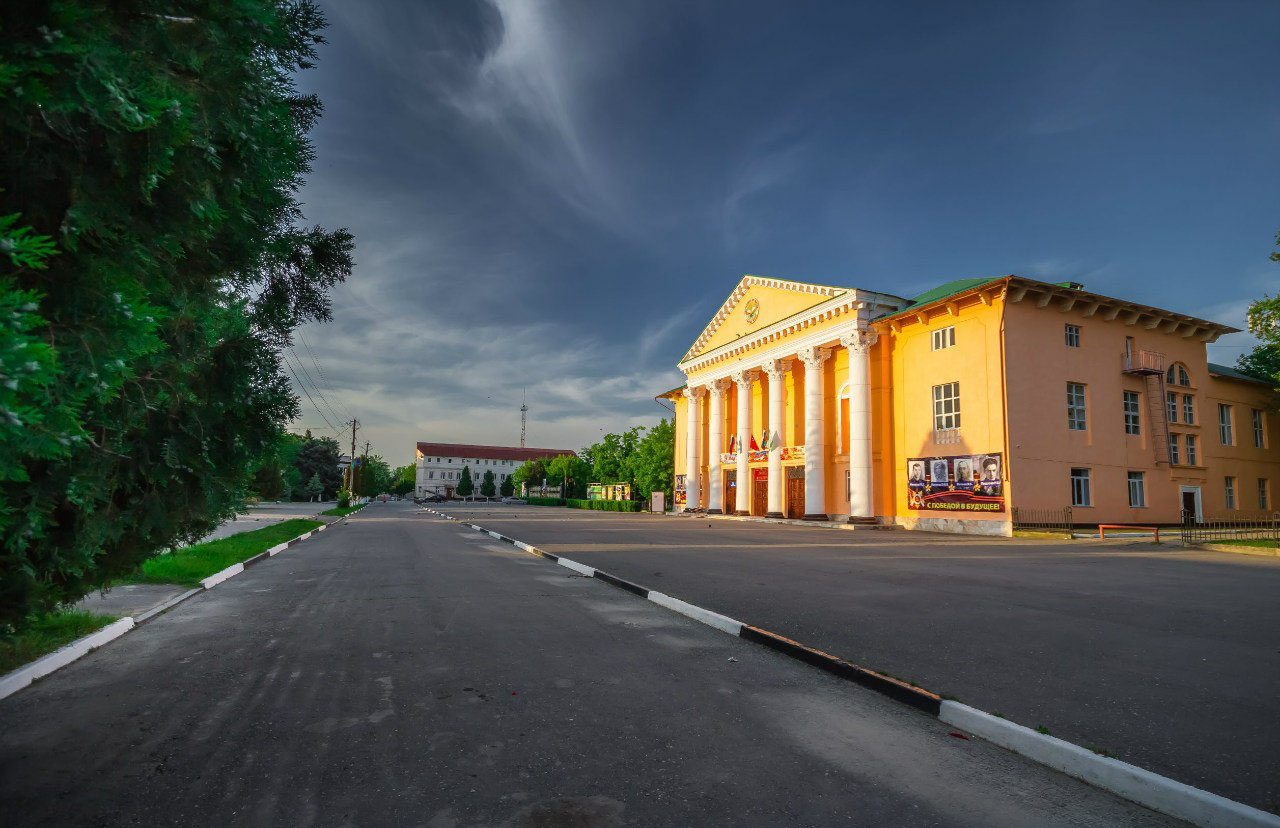

- Coat of arms
- Interactive map of Sunzha
- Location of Sunzha Sunzha (Republic of Ingushetia)
- Coordinates: 43°19′N 45°04′E
- Country: Russia
- Federal subject: Ingushetia
- Founded: 1845
- Town status since: 2016
- Elevation: 320 m (1,050 ft)

Population (2010 Census)
  - Total: 61,598
  - Estimate (2024): 62,843 (+2%)

Administrative status
  - Capital of: Sunzhensky District
- Time zone: UTC+3 (MSK)
- Postal code: 386200-386204
- OKTMO ID: 26720000001
- Website: www.sunzhangrad.ru

Sunzha (Russian: Сунжа, romanized: Sunzha; Ingush: Шолжа-Пхье, romanized: Šolža-Pꜧe) is a town and the administrative center of the Sunzhensky District of the Republic of Ingushetia, Russia. Before 2016 it was a rural locality (stanitsa) called Ordzhonikidzevskaya, (Note: Ingush: Орджоникидзевиски, romanized: Ordzhonikidzevski; Сипсо-гӏала, romanized: Sipso-ghala; КӀурий-Юрт, romanized: Khuriy-Yurt) after Soviet political leader Grigoriy Ordzhonikidze.

Population: 61,598 (2010 census); 65,112 (2002 census); 17,318 (1989 Soviet census). As of the 2010 Census, it was the most populous rural locality in Russia.

== Geography ==
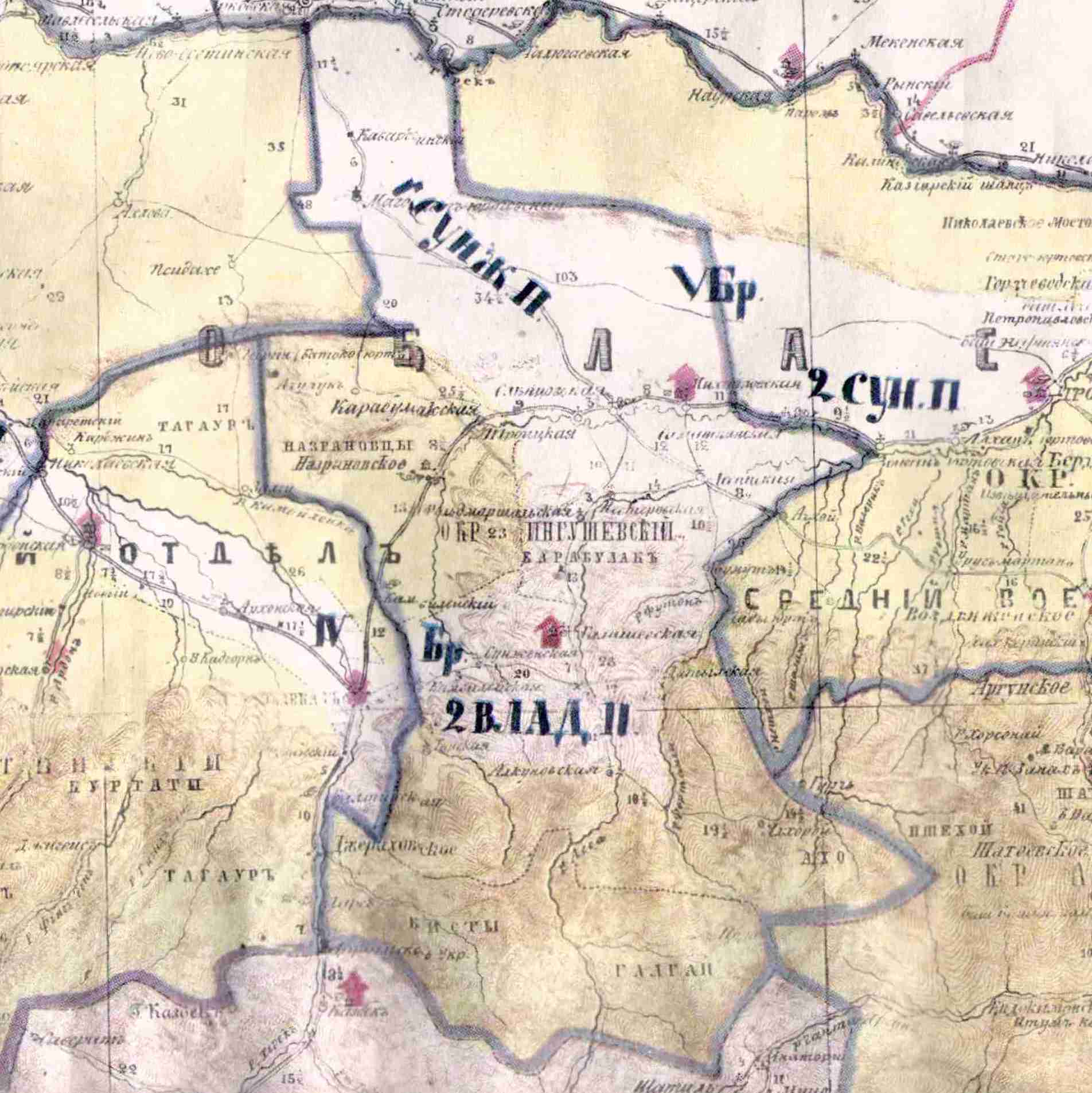
The village of Sunzha on the map of the Ingush district in 1853.

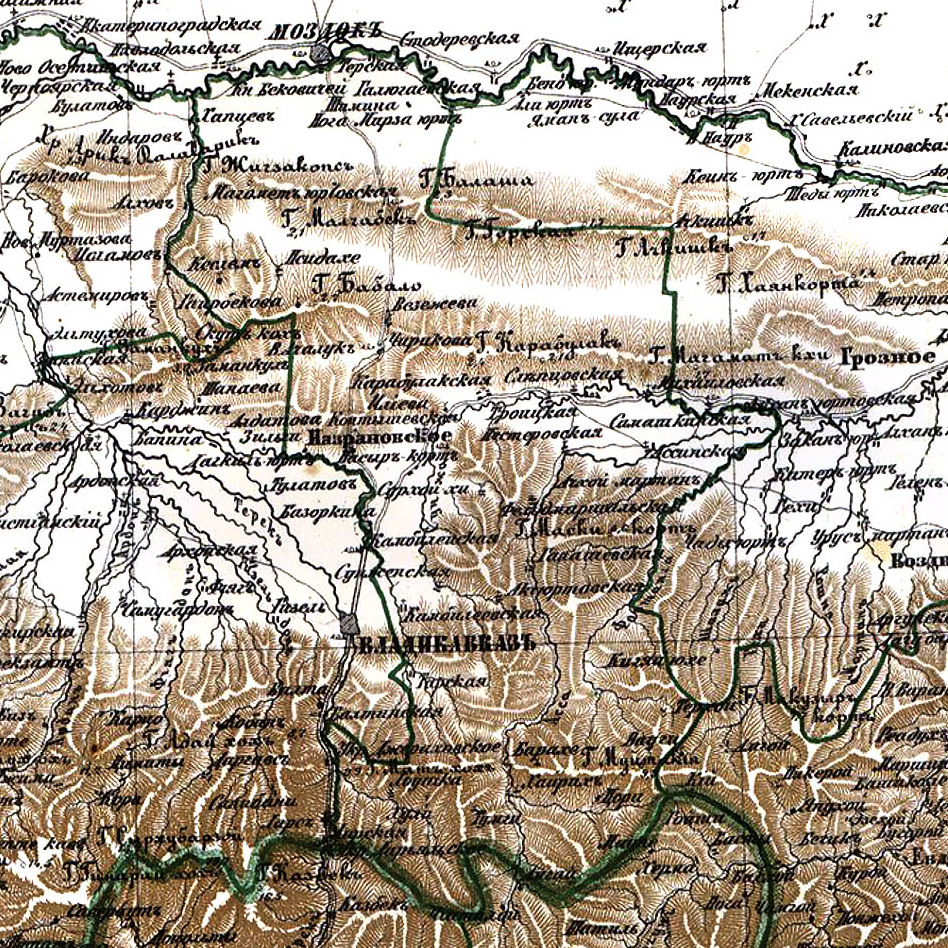
The village of Sunzha on the map of the Ingush district in 1869.

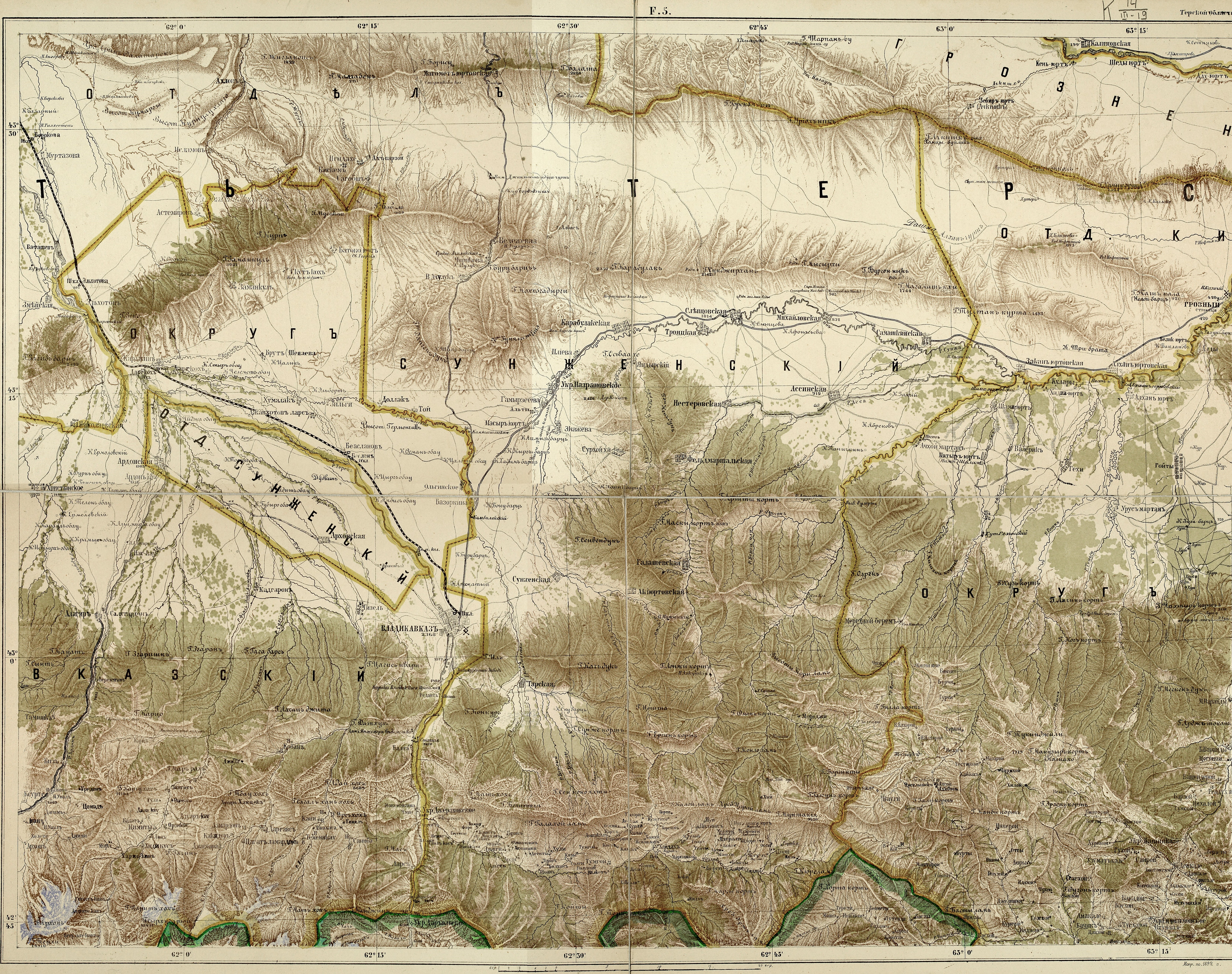
The village Sunzha on the map of Sunzhensky (Ingush) otdel in 1892

Sunzha is located in the valley of the river Sunzha, 22 km (14 mi) northeast from Nazran, and 47 km (29 mi) west from Grozny. Historically, the town was laid on the northern bank of the river, however, currently both banks are inhabited.

Sunzhensky ridge is situated to the north of the town. To the west, Sunzha borders Troitskya, on the east Sernovosky of the Sunzhensky District of Chechnya. 5 km (3.1 mi) to the south lies Nesterovskaya.

The train station Sleptsovkaya of the North Caucasian railway is the last stop on the trail. The railway connection between Sunzha and Grozny existed before the military conflict in Chechnya, however, in the 1990s the railways had been damaged and consequently destroyed.

=== Climate ===
Sunzha has a humid continental climate (Köppen climate classification: Dfa).

Climate data for Sunzha, elevation: 320 m or 1,050 ft, 1961–1990 normals
Month	Jan	Feb	Mar	Apr	May	Jun	Jul	Aug	Sep	Oct	Nov	Dec	Year
Mean daily maximum °C (°F)	0.9 (33.6)	2.1 (35.8)	8.0 (46.4)	17.1 (62.8)	22.5 (72.5)	26.3 (79.3)	29.0 (84.2)	28.2 (82.8)	23.5 (74.3)	15.9 (60.6)	9.1 (48.4)	3.6 (38.5)	15.5 (59.9)
Daily mean °C (°F)	−3.2 (26.2)	−2.0 (28.4)	3.5 (38.3)	11.2 (52.2)	16.6 (61.9)	20.4 (68.7)	23.1 (73.6)	22.3 (72.1)	17.7 (63.9)	10.6 (51.1)	5.0 (41.0)	−0.2 (31.6)	10.4 (50.8)
Mean daily minimum °C (°F)	−7.3 (18.9)	−6.1 (21.0)	−1.1 (30.0)	5.2 (41.4)	10.7 (51.3)	14.5 (58.1)	17.2 (63.0)	16.3 (61.3)	11.9 (53.4)	5.3 (41.5)	0.8 (33.4)	−4.0 (24.8)	5.3 (41.5)
Average precipitation mm (inches)	20 (0.8)	22 (0.9)	27 (1.1)	39 (1.5)	75 (3.0)	83 (3.3)	68 (2.7)	56 (2.2)	42 (1.7)	29 (1.1)	26 (1.0)	23 (0.9)	510 (20.2)
Average precipitation days	6	6	6	6	9	10	7	6	6	6	6	6	80
Source: WMO

== History ==
The establishment of the early settlement is associated with the Ingush highlanders moving from the Assinkoe gorge to the plains. In the 18th century Ingush highlanders established settlements in the modern Sunzhensky district of Ingushetia. According to the maps of 1834, several Ingush settlements are known to the area, including Kurei-Yurt which was lying on the modern boundaries of the town of Sunzha. According to the rapport by the Vladikavkaz commandant the population of the village of Kurai-Yurt was 585 people, which was considered to be a relatively large settlement. The other sources acknowledge the village under the name of Korei-Yurd, such as on the "Map of left flank of the Caucausian line" in 1840.

The founder of the village was Kuri, the son of Ali Ingush: Iаьлий КIури), from the Leimi village of the mountainous Dzheirakhski district of Ingushetia. In the late 1820’s, he moved from his native Leimi and established Kuri-Yurt which existed until 1845, where it was destroyed during the Russian colonization, which established Sunzha line of cossacks settlements on the sights of villages of the indigenous population. During the Russian Empire, the town was the administrative capital of the Sunzhensky Otdel of the Terek Oblast.

In 1845, during the Caucasian war, stanitsa Sunzhenskay had been established as a part of the Sunzha cossack line. The stanitsas were inhabited by settlers from already existing cossack settlements in the Caucasus, as well as Don cossacks.

== Notable people ==
- Zarifa Sautieva, activist
- Movsar Evloev, mixed martial artist

== Bibliography ==
- БIархой, Нина; Коазой, Нурдин; Хайренаькъан, БайIаьла (2016). ГIалгIай-Эрсий Терминий Дошлорг (in Ingush and Russian). Магас. pp. 1–288.
- Оzdoyev, I. A. (1980). Оzdoyevа, F. G.; Kurkiyev, А. S. (eds.). Русско-ингушский словарь: 40 000 слов [Russian-Ingush Dictionary: 40,000 words] (in Ingush and Russian). Мoscow: Russian language. pp. 1–832.
- Сулейманов, А. С. (1985). Ирисханов, И. А. (ed.). Часть IV [Part 4]. Топонимия Чечено-Ингушетии: в IV частях (1976-1985 гг.) (in Russian). Грозный: Чечено-Ингушское Книжное Изд-во. pp. 1–222.
