= Khanty-Mansiysk constituency =

Russian legislative constituency

Khanty-Mansiysk single-member constituency
- Constituency of the Russian State Duma
- Deputy: Pavel Zavalny; United Russia
- Federal subject: Khanty-Mansi Autonomous Okrug
- Districts: Beloyarsky, Beryozovsky, Khanty-Mansiysk, Khanty-Mansiysky, Kogalym, Kondinsky, Nefteyugansk, Nefteyugansky, Nyagan, Oktyabrsky, Pyt-Yakh, Sovetsky, most of Surgutsky, Uray, Yugorsk
- Voters: 546,195 (2026)

The Khanty-Mansiysk constituency (No.222) is a Russian legislative constituency in the Khanty-Mansi Autonomous Okrug. The constituency covers okrug's capital Khanty-Mansiysk as well as western part of the region, including the cities Nefteyugansk, Kogalym and Nyagan.

The constituency has been represented since 2016 by United Russia deputy Pavel Zavalny, four-term State Duma member and former Gazprom executive. Zavalny chaired the Duma Committee on Energy from April 2015 to July 2024.

== Boundaries ==
1993–2003: Beloyarsky, Beryozovsky District, Khanty-Mansiysk, Khanty-Mansiysky District, Kogalym, Kondinsky District, Nefteyugansk, Nefteyugansky District, Nyagan, Oktyabrsky District, Pyt-Yakh, Sovetsky District, Surgutsky District, Uray
The constituency was based in western Khanty-Mansi Autonomous Okrug, covering the okrug capital Khanty-Mansiysk and major oil-mining cities Beloyarsky, Kogalym, Nefteyugansk, Nyagan, Pyt-Yakh and Uray.

2003–2007: Beloyarsky, Beryozovsky District, Khanty-Mansiysk, Khanty-Mansiysky District, Kogalym, Kondinsky District, Nefteyugansk, Nefteyugansky District, Nyagan, Oktyabrsky District, Pyt-Yakh, Sovetsky District, most of Surgutsky District, Uray, Yugorsk
After the 2003 redistricting the constituency was slightly changed, losing Bely Yar and Lokosovo in Surgutsky District to Nizhnevartovsk constituency.

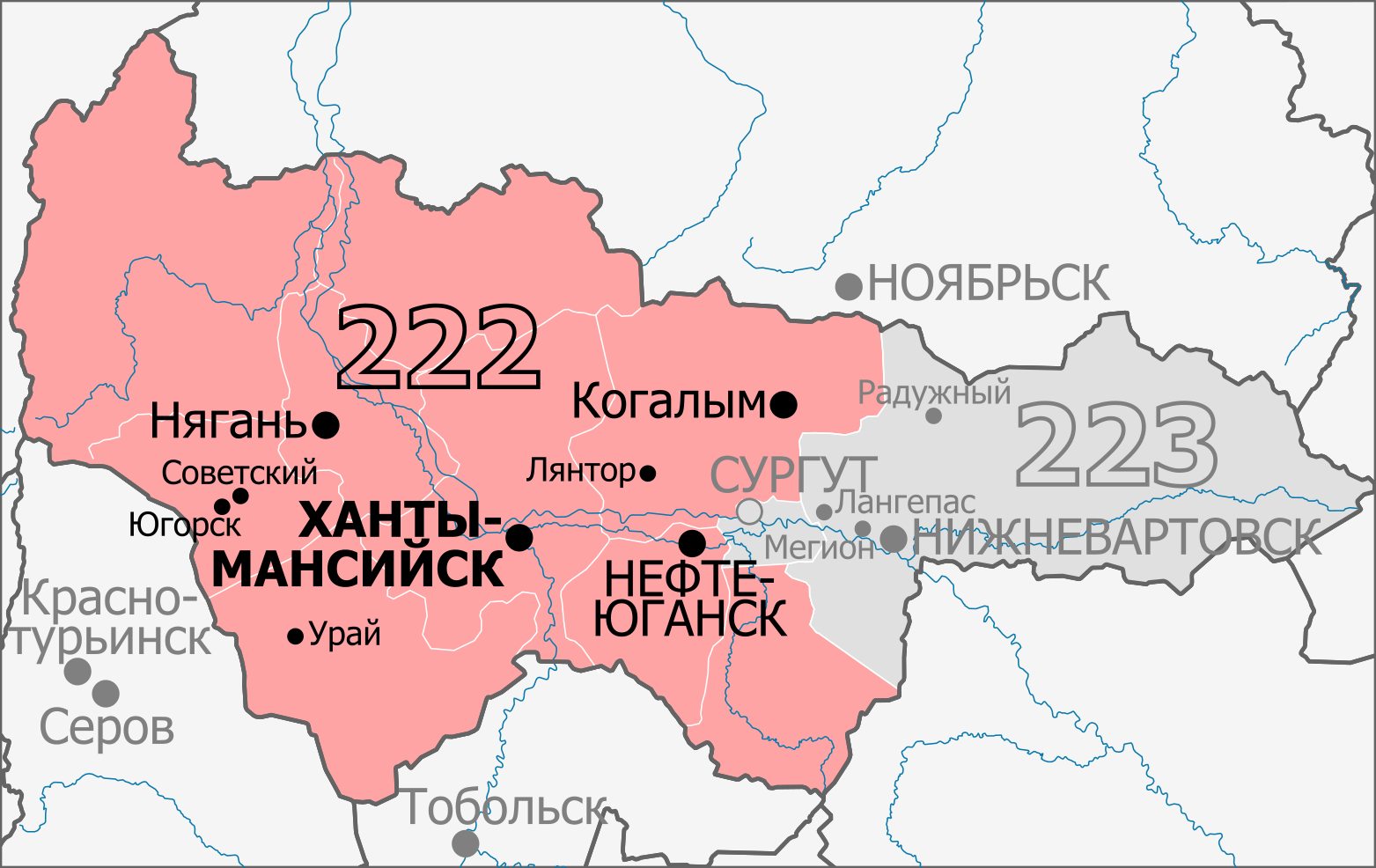
Constituency boundaries from 2016 to 2026

2016–2026: Beloyarsky District, Beryozovsky District, Khanty-Mansiysk, Khanty-Mansiysky District, Kogalym, Kondinsky District, Nefteyugansk, Nefteyugansky District, Nyagan, Oktyabrsky District, Pyt-Yakh, Sovetsky District, Surgutsky District (Barsovo, Bely Yar, Fyodorovsky, Lyamina, Lyantor, Nizhnesortymsky, Russkinskaya, Solnechny, Sytomino, Tundrino, Ugut, Ult-Yagun), Uray, Yugorsk
The constituency was re-created for the 2016 election and retained all of its former territory as well as gained Bely Yar from Nizhnevartovsk constituency.

2026–present: Beloyarsky District, Beryozovsky District, Khanty-Mansiysk, Khanty-Mansiysky District, Kogalym, Kondinsky District, Nefteyugansk, Nefteyugansky District, Nyagan, Oktyabrsky District, Pyt-Yakh, Sovetsky District, most of Surgutsky District, Uray, Yugorsk
Following the 2025 redistricting the constituency was slightly altered, gaining most of Lokosovo in Surgutsky District from Nizhnevartovsk constituency.

== Members elected ==
Election	Member	Party
1993	Yeremey Aypin	Choice of Russia
1995	Aleksandr Lotorev (Note: appointed State Duma Chief of Staff in April 2002)	Independent
1999	Aleksandr Lotorev	Independent
2002	Aleksandr Safonov	Independent
2003	Aleksandr Sarychev	United Russia
2007	Proportional representation - no election by constituency	
2011	Proportional representation - no election by constituency	
2016	Pavel Zavalny	United Russia
2021	Pavel Zavalny	United Russia
2026	Pavel Zavalny	United Russia

== Election results ==
=== 1993 ===
Summary of the 12 December 1993 Russian legislative election in the Khanty-Mansiysk constituency
Candidate	Party	Votes	%
Yeremey Aypin	Choice of Russia	44,156	26.80%
Aleksey Stasenko	Independent	–	18.70%
Mikhail Obnovlenny	Independent	–	–
Aleksandr Prokayev	Independent	–	–
Yury Tropinov	Party of Russian Unity and Accord	–	–
Total		164,791	100%

=== 1995 ===
Summary of the 17 December 1995 Russian legislative election in the Khanty-Mansiysk constituency
Candidate	Party	Votes	%
Aleksandr Lotorev	Independent	61,616	26.80%
Vladimir Petukhov	Independent	58,656	25.51%
Pyotr Volostrigov	Independent	44,596	19.39%
Aleksandr Melnik	Independent	11,974	5.21%
against all		47,122	20.49%
Total		229,941	100%

=== 1999 ===
Summary of the 19 December 1999 Russian legislative election in the Khanty-Mansiysk constituency
Candidate	Party	Votes	%
Aleksandr Lotorev (incumbent)	Independent	88,873	33.52%
Boris Nuriyev	Independent	51,959	19.60%
Lidiya Anaykina	Independent	48,201	18.18%
Aleksandr Igumnov	Independent	25,476	9.61%
Leonid Aseyev	Our Home – Russia	19,248	7.26%
against all		28,040	10.58%
Total		265,146	100%

=== 2002 ===
Summary of the 20 October 2002 by-election in the Khanty-Mansiysk constituency
Candidate	Party	Votes	%
Aleksandr Safonov	Independent	75,452	54.59%
Lidiya Anaykina	Independent	37,527	27.15%
Valery Katukov	Independent	3,363	2.43%
against all		18,839	13.63%
Total		138,226	100%

=== 2003 ===
Summary of the 7 December 2003 Russian legislative election in the Khanty-Mansiysk constituency
Candidate	Party	Votes	%
Aleksandr Sarychev	United Russia	136,040	50.32%
Lidiya Rusanova	United Russian Party Rus'	22,615	8.37%
Viktor Kononov	Communist Party	17,307	6.40%
Vladimir Smolin	Liberal Democratic Party	15,835	5.86%
Yaroslav Alitdinov	Independent	11,412	4.22%
Vadim Pimkin	Union of Right Forces	7,831	2.90%
Rashid Bidyamshin	Great Russia – Eurasian Union	3,929	1.45%
against all		52,096	19.27%
Total		270,552	100%

=== 2016 ===
Summary of the 18 September 2016 Russian legislative election in the Khanty-Mansiysk constituency
Candidate	Party	Votes	%
Pavel Zavalny	United Russia	111,163	45.86%
Yevgeny Markov	Liberal Democratic Party	42,651	17.60%
Aleksey Savintsev	Communist Party	18,597	7.67%
Anatoly Vats	A Just Russia	15,432	6.37%
Tatyana Irduganova	Communists of Russia	14,562	6.01%
Garry Stolyarov	Party of Growth	9,493	3.92%
Aleksandr Lomakin	Patriots of Russia	8,380	3.46%
Oleg Rovin	The Greens	4,493	1.85%
Total		242,395	100%

=== 2021 ===
Summary of the 17-19 September 2021 Russian legislative election in the Khanty-Mansiysk constituency
Candidate	Party	Votes	%
Pavel Zavalny (incumbent)	United Russia	127,622	44.74%
Aleksey Savintsev	Communist Party	31,782	11.14%
Vitaly Chistov	Liberal Democratic Party	26,520	9.30%
Aleksandr Klishin	A Just Russia — For Truth	22,973	8.05%
Maksim Logachev	Communists of Russia	21,415	7.51%
Aleksandr Lomakin	Party of Pensioners	18,566	6.51%
Natalya Stankina	Civic Platform	11,127	3.90%
Ivan Menshenin	Yabloko	6,085	2.13%
Total		285,265	100%

=== 2026 ===
Summary of the 18-20 September 2026 Russian legislative election in the Khanty-Mansiysk constituency
Candidate	Party	Votes	%
Pavel Zavalny (incumbent)	United Russia	193,694	55.08%
Andrey Yekimov	Liberal Democratic Party	43,954	12.50%
Vasily Zhukov	Communist Party	43,569	12.39%
Konstantin Aydakov	A Just Russia	24,162	6.87%
Igor Kornilov	New People	24,134	6.86%
Ilya Kozlovsky	The Greens	11,028	3.14%
Total		351,632	100%
