= Nizhnevartovsk constituency =

Russian legislative constituency

Nizhnevartovsk single-member constituency
- Constituency of the Russian State Duma
- Deputy: Dmitry Aksyonov; United Russia
- Federal subject: Khanty-Mansi Autonomous Okrug
- Districts: Langepas, Megion, Nizhnevartovsk, Nizhnevartovsky, Pokachi, Raduzhny, Surgut, Surgutsky (part of Lokosovo)
- Voters: 593,518 (2026)

The Nizhnevartovsk constituency (No.223 (Note: No.221 in 1993-2007)) is a Russian legislative constituency in the Khanty-Mansi Autonomous Okrug. The constituency covers eastern Khanty-Mansi Autonomous Okrug, including Surgut and Nizhnevartovsk.

The constituency has been represented since 2026 by United Russia deputy Dmitry Aksyonov, former Member of Duma of Khanty-Mansi Autonomous Okrug and retired Rosgvardiya podpolkovnik, who won the open seat after one-term United Russia incumbent Vadim Shuvalov ran for Tyumen Oblast Duma.

== Boundaries ==
1993–2003: Langepas, Megion, Nizhnevartovsk, Nizhnevartovsky District, Pokachi, Raduzhny, Surgut
The constituency was based in eastern Khanty-Mansi Autonomous Okrug, covering oil-mining cities Langepas, Megion, Nizhnevartovsk, Pokachi, Raduzhny and Surgut. This seat was non-contiguous as Surgut was fully surrounded by Surgutsky District, part of Khanty-Mansiysk constituency.

2003–2007: Langepas, Megion, Nizhnevartovsk, Nizhnevartovsky District, Pokachi, Raduzhny, Surgut, Surgutsky District (Bely Yar, Lokosovo)
After the 2003 redistricting the constituency was slightly changed, gaining Bely Yar and Lokosovo in Surgutsky District from Khanty-Mansiysk constituency.

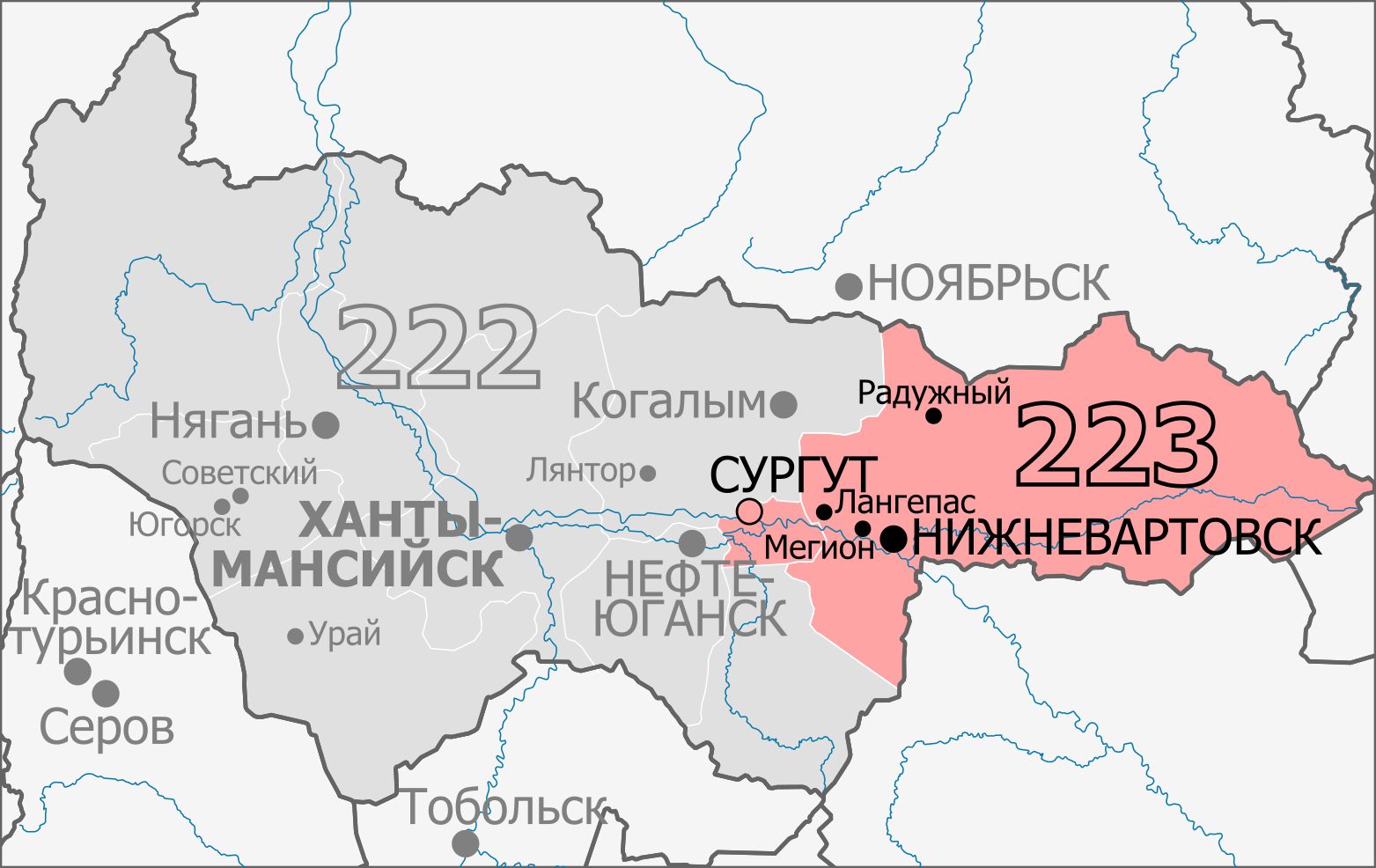
Constituency boundaries from 2016 to 2026

2016–2026: Langepas, Megion, Nizhnevartovsk, Nizhnevartovsky District, Pokachi, Raduzhny, Surgut, Surgutsky District (Lokosovo)
The constituency was re-created for the 2016 election and retained most of its former territory, losing Bely Yar to Khanty-Mansiysk constituency.

2026–present: Langepas, Megion, Nizhnevartovsk, Nizhnevartovsky District, Pokachi, Raduzhny, Surgut, Surgutsky District (part of Lokosovo)
Following the 2025 redistricting the constituency was slightly altered, losing most of Lokosovo in Surgutsky District to Khanty-Mansiysk constituency, except for a small strip connecting Surgut with the rest of the constituency.

== Members elected ==
Election	Member	Party
1993	Vladimir Medvedev	Independent
1995	Vladimir Medvedev	Independent
1999	Aleksandr Ryazanov (Note: elected Deputy Chairman of the Board of Directors of Gazprom in November 2001)	Independent
2002	Vladimir Aseyev	Independent
2003	Vladimir Aseyev	United Russia
2007	Proportional representation - no election by constituency	
2011	Proportional representation - no election by constituency	
2016	Aleksandr Sidorov	United Russia
2021	Vadim Shuvalov	United Russia
2026	Dmitry Aksyonov	United Russia

== Election results ==
=== 1993 ===
Summary of the 12 December 1993 Russian legislative election in the Nizhnevartovsk constituency
Candidate	Party	Votes	%
Vladimir Medvedev	Independent	47,305	32.11%
Aleksandr Gilev	Independent	–	20.20%
Khamid Yasaveyev	Independent	–	–
Kairat Zamaletdinov	Independent	–	–
Total		147,339	100%

=== 1995 ===
Summary of the 17 December 1995 Russian legislative election in the Nizhnevartovsk constituency
Candidate	Party	Votes	%
Vladimir Medvedev (incumbent)	Independent	61,623	28.66%
Nikolay Krupinin	Independent	41,755	19.42%
Gennady Levin	Independent	34,539	16.07%
Vladimir Tikhonov	Democratic Alternative	27,030	12.57%
Viktor Kononov	Communist Party	18,704	8.70%
against all		28,565	13.29%
Total		214,984	100%

=== 1999 ===
Summary of the 19 December 1999 Russian legislative election in the Nizhnevartovsk constituency
Candidate	Party	Votes	%
Aleksandr Ryazanov	Independent	108,966	42.20%
Aleksey Yelin	Independent	39,862	15.44%
Boris Salomatin	Independent	27,989	10.84%
Yury Rumyantsev	Yabloko	19,987	7.74%
Aleksandr Smirnov	Communist Party	18,230	7.06%
Valery Salakhov	Independent	11,210	4.34%
Aleksandr Ivanyuk	Liberal Democratic Party	5,975	2.31%
Ildar Ziganshin	Independent	2,652	1.03%
Sany Shiryazdanov	Independent	1,859	0.72%
against all		18,934	7.33%
Total		258,215	100%

=== 2002 ===
Summary of the 24 March 2002 by-election in the Nizhnevartovsk constituency
Candidate	Party	Votes	%
Vladimir Aseyev	Independent	108,638	73.48%
Vladimir Belovodsky	Independent	2,854	1.93%
Andrey Turok	Independent	965	0.65%
against all		31,088	21.03%
Total		147,850	100%

=== 2003 ===
Summary of the 7 December 2003 Russian legislative election in the Nizhnevartovsk constituency
Candidate	Party	Votes	%
Vladimir Aseyev (incumbent)	United Russia	110,406	43.11%
Sergey Kandakov	Independent	55,633	21.72%
Vladimir Krepkikh	Independent	12,224	4.77%
Galina Shustova	Communist Party	10,735	4.19%
Sergey Kovalev	Rodina	9,034	3.53%
Igor Kuzmin	Liberal Democratic Party	6,409	2.50%
Larisa Murzina	Union of Right Forces	5,525	2.16%
Nina Polyakova	Russian Communist Workers Party — Russian Party of Communists	4,818	1.88%
Vladimir Anaykin	United Russian Party Rus'	1,578	0.62%
against all		36,918	14.42%
Total		256,355	100%

=== 2016 ===
Summary of the 18 September 2016 Russian legislative election in the Nizhnevartovsk constituency
Candidate	Party	Votes	%
Aleksandr Sidorov	United Russia	73,451	37.36%
Aleksandr Peterman	Rodina	27,927	14.20%
Vladimir Sysoyev	Liberal Democratic Party	24,929	12.68%
Mikhail Serdyuk	A Just Russia	20,260	10.30%
Vyacheslav Tetyokin	Communist Party	11,893	6.05%
Vadim Abdurrakhmanov	Communists of Russia	8,054	4.10%
Svetlana Titova	Yabloko	7,998	4.07%
Aigul Zaripova	Party of Growth	4,873	2.48%
Vladimir Zinovyev	Patriots of Russia	3,506	1.78%
Sergey Vorobyov	People's Freedom Party	3,443	1.75%
Total		196,613	100%

=== 2021 ===
Summary of the 17-19 September 2021 Russian legislative election in the Nizhnevartovsk constituency
Candidate	Party	Votes	%
Vadim Shuvalov	United Russia	77,160	33.77%
Yevgeny Markov	Liberal Democratic Party	31,940	13.98%
Vyacheslav Tetyokin	Communist Party	27,016	11.82%
Mikhail Serdyuk	A Just Russia — For Truth	26,150	11.44%
Vadim Abdurrakhmanov	Communists of Russia	22,528	9.86%
Vladimir Tseytlin	New People	18,899	8.27%
Timur Latipov	Civic Platform	7,493	3.28%
Total		228,511	100%

=== 2026 ===
Summary of the 18-20 September 2026 Russian legislative election in the Nizhnevartovsk constituency
Candidate	Party	Votes	%
Dmitry Aksyonov	United Russia	159,165	47.53%
Viktor Sysun	Liberal Democratic Party	45,262	13.52%
Aleksey Savintsev	Communist Party	35,582	10.63%
Artur Waiman	New People	30,479	9.10%
Vladimir Dmitriyev	Communists of Russia	27,931	8.34%
Aleksey Anosov	A Just Russia	25,804	7.71%
Total		334,875	100%
