= By-elections to the 3rd Russian State Duma =

By-elections to the 3rd State Duma of the Russian Federation were held to fill vacant seats in the State Duma between the 1999 election and the 2003 election.

Constituency	Date	Former MP	Party	Cause	Winner	Party	Retained
Vladivostok No.50, Primorsky Krai	26 March 2000	None	None	Nobody received enough votes in the general election	Viktor Cherepkov	Independent	Yes
Kamchatka No.87, Kamchatka Oblast	26 March 2000	None	None	Nobody received enough votes in the general election	Valery Dorogin	Independent	Yes
Vsevolozhsk No.99, Leningrad Oblast	26 March 2000	None	None	Nobody received enough votes in the general election	Aleksandr Nevzorov	Independent	No
Mytishchi No.108, Moscow Oblast	26 March 2000	None	None	Nobody received enough votes in the general election	Arkady Baskayev	Independent	No
Odintsovo No.110, Moscow Oblast	26 March 2000	None	None	Nobody received enough votes in the general election	Viktor Alksnis	Independent	No
Verkh-Isetsky No.162, Sverdlovsk Oblast	26 March 2000	None	None	Nobody received enough votes in the general election	Yevgeny Zyablitsev	Independent	Yes
Ordzhonikidzevsky No.165, Sverdlovsk Oblast	26 March 2000	None	None	Nobody received enough votes in the general election	Nikolay Ovchinnikov	Independent	Yes
North West No.210, Saint Petersburg	26 March 2000	None	None	Nobody received enough votes in the general election	Konstantin Sevenard	Independent	No
Chechnya No.31, Chechnya	20 August 2000	None	None	Elections were not held	Aslambek Aslakhanov	Independent	Yes
Northern No.209, Saint Petersburg	15 October 2000	Sergey Stepashin	Yabloko	New post	Vacant. By-election declared invalid due to low turnout.		No
Monchegorsk No.115, Murmansk Oblast	3 December 2000	Gennady Luzin	Independent	Death	Igor Chernyshenko	Independent	Yes
Karachay-Cherkessia No.15, Karachay-Cherkessia	10 December 2000	Boris Berezovsky	Independent	Resigned	Magomet Tekeyev	Independent	Yes
Kolomna No.106, Moscow Oblast	18 March 2001	German Titov	Communist Party	Death	Gennady Gudkov	Independent	No
Ingushetia No.12, Ingushetia	15 April 2001	Mikhail Gutseriyev	Independent	New post	Alikhan Amirkhanov	Independent	Yes
Tikhoretsk No.43, Krasnodar Krai	20 May 2001	Aleksandr Tkachyov	Communist Party	New post	Nikolay Denisov	Independent	No
Kineshma No.79, Ivanovo Oblast	27 May 2001	Vladimir Tikhonov	Communist Party	New post	Valentina Krutova	Independent	No
Chukotka No.223, Chukotka Autonomous Okrug	1 July 2001	Roman Abramovich	Independent	New post	Vladimir Yetylin	Independent	Yes
Blagoveshchensk No.58, Amur Oblast	7 October 2001	Leonid Korotkov	Independent	New post	Aleksandr Vinidiktov	Independent	Yes
Arkhangelsk No.59, Arkhangelsk Oblast	7 October 2001	Aleksandr Piskunov	Fatherland – All Russia	New post	Vacant. By-election declared invalid due to low turnout.		No
Tuva No.27, Tuva	14 October 2001	Nikolay Loktionov	Unity	New post	Chylgychy Ondar	Independent	No
Chertanovo No.204, Moscow	14 October 2001	Sergey Shokhin	Fatherland – All Russia	New post	Vacant. By-election declared invalid due to low turnout.		No
Northern No.209, Saint Petersburg	14 October 2001	None	None	Nobody received enough votes in the previous by-election	Vacant. By-election declared invalid due to low turnout.		No
Yamalo-Nenets No.225, Yamalo-Nenets Autonomous Okrug	16 December 2001	Viktor Chernomyrdin	Our Home – Russia	New post	Natalya Komarova	Independent	No
Nizhnevartovsk No.221, Khanty-Mansi Autonomous Okrug	24 March 2002	Aleksandr Ryazanov	Independent	New post	Vladimir Aseyev	Independent	Yes
Dzerzhinsk No.119, Nizhny Novgorod Oblast	31 March 2002	Gennady Khodyrev	Independent	New post	Vladimir Basov	Independent	Yes
Gorno-Altaysk No.2, Altai Republic	19 May 2002	Mikhail Lapshin	Fatherland – All Russia	New post	Sergey Pekpeyev	Independent	No
Central No.130, Omsk Oblast	29 September 2002	Aleksandr Vereteno	Independent	Death	Vacant. By-election declared invalid due to low turnout.		No
Khanty-Mansiysk No.222, Khanty-Mansi Autonomous Okrug	20 October 2002	Aleksandr Lotorev	Independent	New post	Aleksandr Safonov	Independent	Yes
