= Abatsky =

Abatsky (masculine), Abatskaya (feminine), or Abatskoye (neuter) may refer to:

- Abatsky District, a district of Tyumen Oblast, Russia
- Abatskoye, a rural locality (a selo) in Abatsky District of Tyumen Oblast, Russia
