= Poykovsky =

Poykovsky Пойковский
- Urban-type settlement
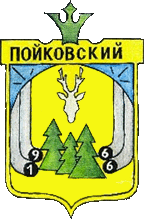
- Coat of arms
- Location of Poykovsky
- Location of Poykovsky Poykovsky (Khanty–Mansi Autonomous Okrug)
- Coordinates: 60.9962°N 71.8967°E
- Country: Russia
- Federal subject: Khanty-Mansi Autonomous Okrug
- Administrative district: Nefteyugansky District
- Founded: 1964

Population (2010 Census)
  - Total: 25,594
- Time zone: UTC+5 (MSK+2)
- Postal code(s): 628331
- OKTMO ID: 71818157051

Poykovsky (Russian: Пойковский) is an urban locality (an urban-type settlement) in Nefteyugansky District of Khanty-Mansi Autonomous Okrug, Russia. Population: 25,594 (2010 Census); 27,540 (2002 Census); 14,901 (1989 Soviet census).
