= Monchegorsk constituency =

Russian legislative constituency

Monchegorsk single-member constituency
- Constituency of the Russian State Duma
- Deputy: None
- Federal subject: Murmansk Oblast
- Districts: Apatity, Kandalaksha, Kirovsk, Kolsky, Kovdorsky, Monchegorsk, Olenegorsk, Pechengsky, Polyarny, Polyarnye Zori, Skalisty, Snezhnogorsk, Zaozyorsk
- Voters: 374,889 (1999)

The Monchegorsk constituency (No.115) was a Russian legislative constituency in the Murmansk Oblast in 1993–2003. It covered western Murmansk Oblast. The constituency was last occupied by United Russia deputy and Regions of Russia faction member Igor Chernyshenko, former Deputy Governor of Murmansk Oblast, who won a by-election in 2000.

The constituency was dissolved in 2003 due to declining population in Murmansk Oblast, which resulted in Monchegorsk constituency being merged with Murmansk constituency.

== Boundaries ==
1993–2003: Apatity, Kandalaksha, Kirovsk, Kolsky District, Kovdorsky District, Monchegorsk, Olenegorsk, Pechengsky District, Polyarny, Polyarnye Zori, Skalisty, Snezhnogorsk, Zaozyorsk
The constituency covered western Murmansk Oblast, including the towns of Apatity, Kandalaksha, Kirovsk, Monchegorsk, Olenegorsk, Polyarny and Polyarnye Zori.

== Members elected ==
Election	Member	Party
1993	Vladimir Manannikov	Choice of Russia
1995	Lyudmila Pobedinskaya	Our Home – Russia
1999	Gennady Luzin (Note: died in January 2000)	Independent
2000	Igor Chernyshenko	Independent

== Election results ==
=== 1993 ===
==== Declared candidates ====
- Pavel Bogushevich (Independent), greenhouse director (previously ran as APR candidate)
- Aleksandr Fufygin (PRES), former Deputy Chairman of the Murmansk City Council of People's Deputies (1990–1993)
- Viktor Ladan (Independent), former Member of Apatity City Council of People's Deputies (1990–1993), sheet metal worker
- Gennady Luzin (Civic Union), former First Deputy Governor of Murmansk Oblast (1991–1992)
- Vladimir Manannikov (Choice of Russia), former People's Deputy of Russia (1990–1993)
- Anatoly Smirnov (Independent), Consul General in Kirkenes (1992–present)

==== Results ====
Summary of the 12 December 1993 Russian legislative election in the Monchegorsk constituency
Candidate	Party	Votes	%
Vladimir Manannikov	Choice of Russia	29,494	14.23%
Viktor Ladan	Independent	28,346	13.67%
Gennady Luzin	Civic Union	27,799	13.41%
Pavel Bogushevich	Independent	23,668	11.42%
Anatoly Smirnov	Independent	18,912	9.12%
Aleksandr Fufygin	Party of Russian Unity and Accord	10,758	5.19%
against all		52,746	25.45%
Total		207,288	100%

=== 1995 ===
==== Declared candidates ====
- Mikhail Antropov (CPRF), former First Secretary of the CPSU Kirovsk City Committee (1990–1991)
- Vasily Kalaida (Independent), Member of Murmansk Oblast Duma (1994–present)
- Konstantin Kolomiyets (Independent)
- Natalya Lazareva (Independent), banker
- Vladimir Manannikov (DVR–OD), incumbent Member of State Duma (1994–present)
- Andrey Matorin (Duma-96)
- Vladimir Musatyan (Independent), Northern Fleet submarine 3rd flotilla officer
- Lyudmila Pobedinskaya (NDR), Member of Federation Council (1994–1995)
- Anatoly Shevchenko (Independent), Russian Navy vice admiral
- Mikhail Solovey (Independent)
- Yury Sukhachyov (Independent), chief of staff to the Northern Fleet submarine 3rd flotilla (1993–present)
- Ivan Vishnyakov (Kedr)

==== Results ====
Summary of the 17 December 1995 Russian legislative election in the Monchegorsk constituency
Candidate	Party	Votes	%
Lyudmila Pobedinskaya	Our Home – Russia	42,083	16.70%
Mikhail Antropov	Communist Party	36,406	14.45%
Natalya Lazareva	Independent	30,433	12.08%
Vladimir Manannikov (incumbent)	Democratic Choice of Russia – United Democrats	30,310	12.03%
Ivan Vishnyakov	Kedr	15,826	6.28%
Yury Sukhachyov	Independent	14,906	5.92%
Andrey Matorin	Duma-96	11,354	4.51%
Vasily Kalaida	Independent	9,916	3.94%
Anatoly Shevchenko	Independent	9,326	3.70%
Konstantin Kolomiyets	Independent	5,196	2.06%
Vladimir Musatyan	Independent	2,930	1.16%
Mikhail Solovey	Independent	2,268	0.90%
against all		36,752	14.59%
Total		251,944	100%

=== 1999 ===
Results by district: Gennady Luzin: 20–30% 30–40%; Mikhail Antropov: 20–30%; Vladimir Veregin: 10–20%

==== Declared candidates ====
- Mikhail Antropov (CPRF), Member of Murmansk Oblast Duma (1997–present), 1995 candidate for this seat
- Natalya Gerivenko (DN), middle school deputy principal
- Gennady Luzin (Independent), former First Deputy Governor of Murmansk Oblast (1991–1992), 1993 candidate for this seat
- Boris Misnik (Yabloko), Member of State Duma (1996–present), Chairman of the Duma Committee on Problems of the North and the Far East (1998–present)
- Lyudmila Pobedinskaya (NDR), incumbent Member of State Duma (1996–present)
- Vladimir Veregin (Independent), retired Russian Navy counter admiral

==== Did not file ====
- Yevgeny Golovenkov (Independent), copper mine chief
- Vadim Oreshin (Independent), Russian Navy captain
- Stanislav Zhebrovsky (LDPR), Member of State Duma (1994–present)

==== Results ====
Summary of the 19 December 1999 Russian legislative election in the Monchegorsk constituency
Candidate	Party	Votes	%
Gennady Luzin	Independent	61,329	26.17%
Mikhail Antropov	Communist Party	40,779	17.40%
Boris Misnik	Yabloko	36,224	15.46%
Vladimir Veregin	Independent	35,576	15.18%
Lyudmila Pobedinskaya (incumbent)	Our Home – Russia	21,702	9.26%
Natalya Gerivenko	Spiritual Heritage	6,897	2.94%
against all		29,119	12.42%
Total		234,380	100%

=== June 2000 ===
The results of the by-election were annulled due to low turnout (23.83%).

==== Declared candidates ====
- Mikhail Antropov (Independent), Member of Murmansk Oblast Duma (1997–present), 1995 and 1999 candidate for this seat
- Igor Chernyshenko (Independent), Deputy Governor of Murmansk Oblast (1998–present)
- Viktor Gribakin (Independent), aircraft parts businessman
- Aleksandr Krasnoperov (Independent), nonprofit president
- Boris Misnik (Independent), former Member of State Duma (1996–1999), 1999 candidate for this seat
- Lyudmila Morozova (Independent), Deputy Mayor of Kola
- Aleksandr Yakimov (Independent), unemployed
- Mikhail Zhivilo (Independent), metallurgy businessman
- Yury Zhivilo (Independent), metallurgy businessman, brother of Mikhail Zhivilo

==== Withdrawn candidates ====
- Vladimir Veregin (Independent), retired Russian Navy counter admiral, 1999 candidate for this seat

==== Did not file ====
- Aleksandr Milekhin (Independent)

==== Results ====
Summary of the 18 June 2000 by-election in the Monchegorsk constituency
Candidate	Party	Votes	%
Igor Chernyshenko	Independent	35,268	40.31%
Boris Misnik	Independent	19,870	22.71%
Mikhail Antropov	Independent	18,227	20.83%
Lyudmila Morozova	Independent	2,211	2.52%
Aleksandr Yakimov	Independent	928	1.06%
Viktor Gribakin	Independent	832	0.95%
Mikhail Zhivilo	Independent	692	0.79%
Aleksandr Krasnoperov	Independent	532	0.60%
Yury Zhivilo	Independent	352	0.40%
against all		7,636	8.72%
Total		87,486	100%

=== December 2000 ===
==== Declared candidates ====
- Igor Chernyshenko (Independent), Deputy Governor of Murmansk Oblast (1998–present), June 2000 candidate for this seat
- Bogdan Khmelnitsky (Independent), sociologist
- Viktor Ladan (Independent), former Member of Murmansk Oblast Duma (1995–1997), 1993 candidate for this seat
- Boris Misnik (Independent), former Member of State Duma (1996–1999), 1999 and June 2000 candidate for this seat
- Vladislav Shved (Independent), former Member of Supreme Soviet of Lithuania (1990–1991), chief of staff to State Duma member Vladimir Zhirinovsky

==== Did not file ====
- Andrey Bilin (Independent), co-chairman of the SDPR Apatity office
- Aleksandr Krasnoperov (Independent), nonprofit president, June 2000 candidate for this seat
- Mikhail Plakhteyev (Independent)

==== Results ====
Summary of the 3 December 2000 by-election in the Monchegorsk constituency
Candidate	Party	Votes	%
Igor Chernyshenko	Independent	62,419	45.08%
Boris Misnik	Independent	26,514	19.15%
Viktor Ladan	Independent	15,178	10.96%
Vladislav Shved	Independent	7,095	5.12%
Bogdan Khmelnitsky	Independent	5,385	3.89%
against all		19,430	14.00%
Total		138,456	100%
