= Khanty-Mansiysky =

Khanty-Mansiysky (masculine), Khanty-Mansiyskaya (feminine), or Khanty-Mansiyskoye (neuter) may refer to:

- Khanty-Mansi Autonomous Okrug (Khanty-Mansiysky avtonomny okrug), a federal subject of Russia
- Khanty-Mansiysky District, a district of Khanty-Mansi Autonomous Okrug
