= Pyt-Yakh =

Pyt-Yakh Пыть-Ях
- Town
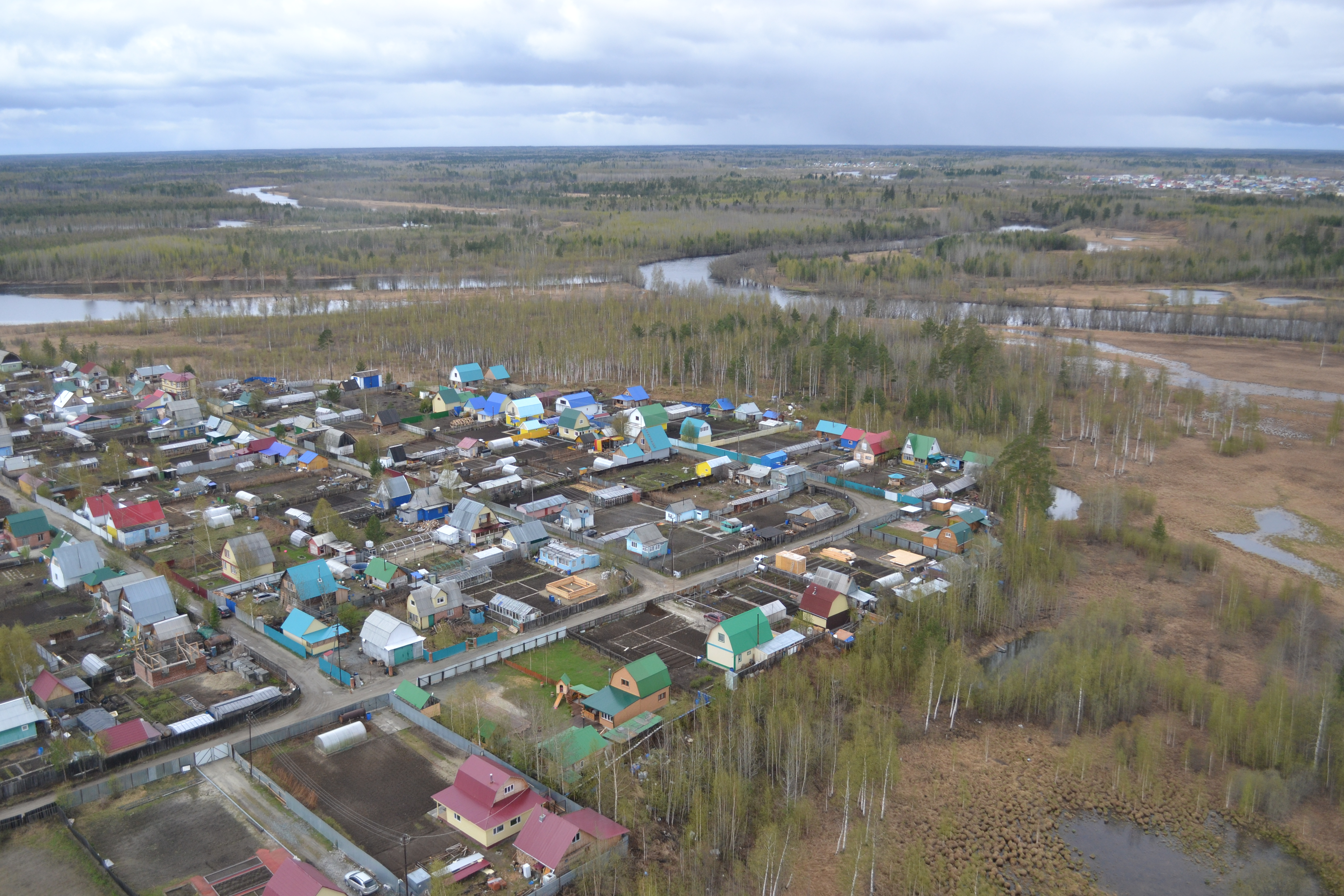
- Pyt-Yakh

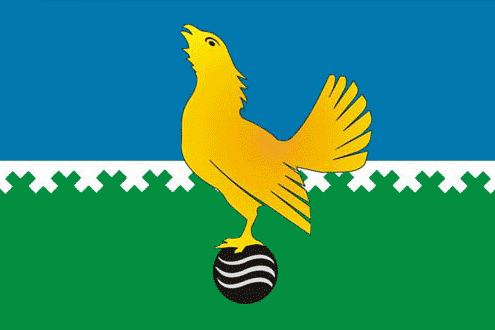
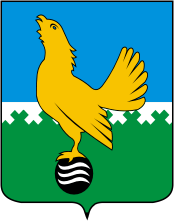
- Flag Coat of arms
- Interactive map of Pyt-Yakh
- Location of Pyt-Yakh Pyt-Yakh (Khanty–Mansi Autonomous Okrug)
- Coordinates: 60°45′N 72°47′E
- Country: Russia
- Federal subject: Khanty-Mansi Autonomous Okrug
- Founded: 1990
- Elevation: 50 m (160 ft)

Population (2010 Census)
  - Total: 41,488
  - Estimate (2021): 40,180 (−3.2%)

Administrative status
  - Subordinated to: town of okrug significance of Pyt-Yakh
  - Capital of: town of okrug significance of Pyt-Yakh

Municipal status
  - Urban okrug: Pyt-Yakh Urban Okrug
  - Capital of: Pyt-Yakh Urban Okrug
- Time zone: UTC+5 (MSK+2)
- Postal code: 628380–628387
- Dialing code: +7 3432
- OKTMO ID: 71885000001
- Website: adm.gov86.org

Pyt-Yakh (Russian: Пыть-Ях) is a town in Khanty–Mansi Autonomous Okrug, Russia, located on the east bank of the Bolshoy Balyk River, southeast of Khanty-Mansiysk. Population: 41,488 (2010 census); 41,813 (2002 census); 17,101 (1989 Soviet census).

== History ==
The town was formed by merging the settlements of Mamontovo and Pyt-Yakh in 1990. The name of the town means "place of good people" in the Khanty language.

== Administrative and municipal status ==
Within the framework of administrative divisions, it is incorporated as the town of okrug significance of Pyt-Yakh—an administrative unit with the status equal to that of the districts. As a municipal division, the town of okrug significance of Pyt-Yakh is incorporated as Pyt-Yakh Urban Okrug.

== Economy ==
The town's economy is based on oil and natural gas extraction.
