= Pim (river) =

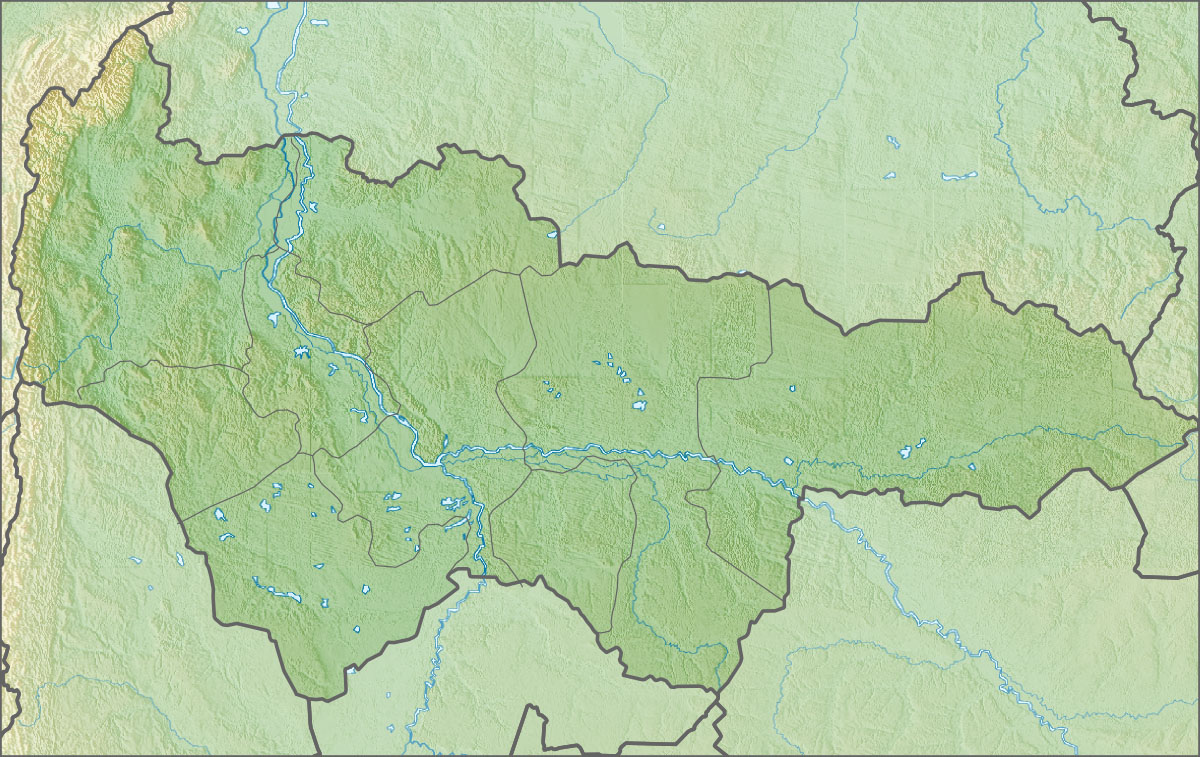
- Mouth location in Khanty-Mansi Autonomous Okrug, Russia

Location
- Country: Russia

Physical characteristics
- Source: Siberian Uvaly
- Mouth: Ob
  - coordinates: 61.2864°N 72.0014°E
- Length: 390 km (240 mi)
- Basin size: 12,700 km^{2} (4,900 sq mi)

Basin features
- Progression: Ob→ Kara Sea

The Pim is a river in the Khanty-Mansi Autonomous Okrug in Russia. It is a right tributary of the Ob. It is 390 kilometres (240 mi) long, with a drainage basin of 12,700 square kilometres (4,900 mi^{2}). The average discharge 166 kilometres (103 mi) from its mouth is 68 cubic metres per second (2,400 cu ft/s). The river is frozen over from the end of November until May.

The town of Lyantor is along the Pim.
