= Vadim Shuvalov =

Russian politician

Vadim Shuvalov MP
- Вадим Шувалов
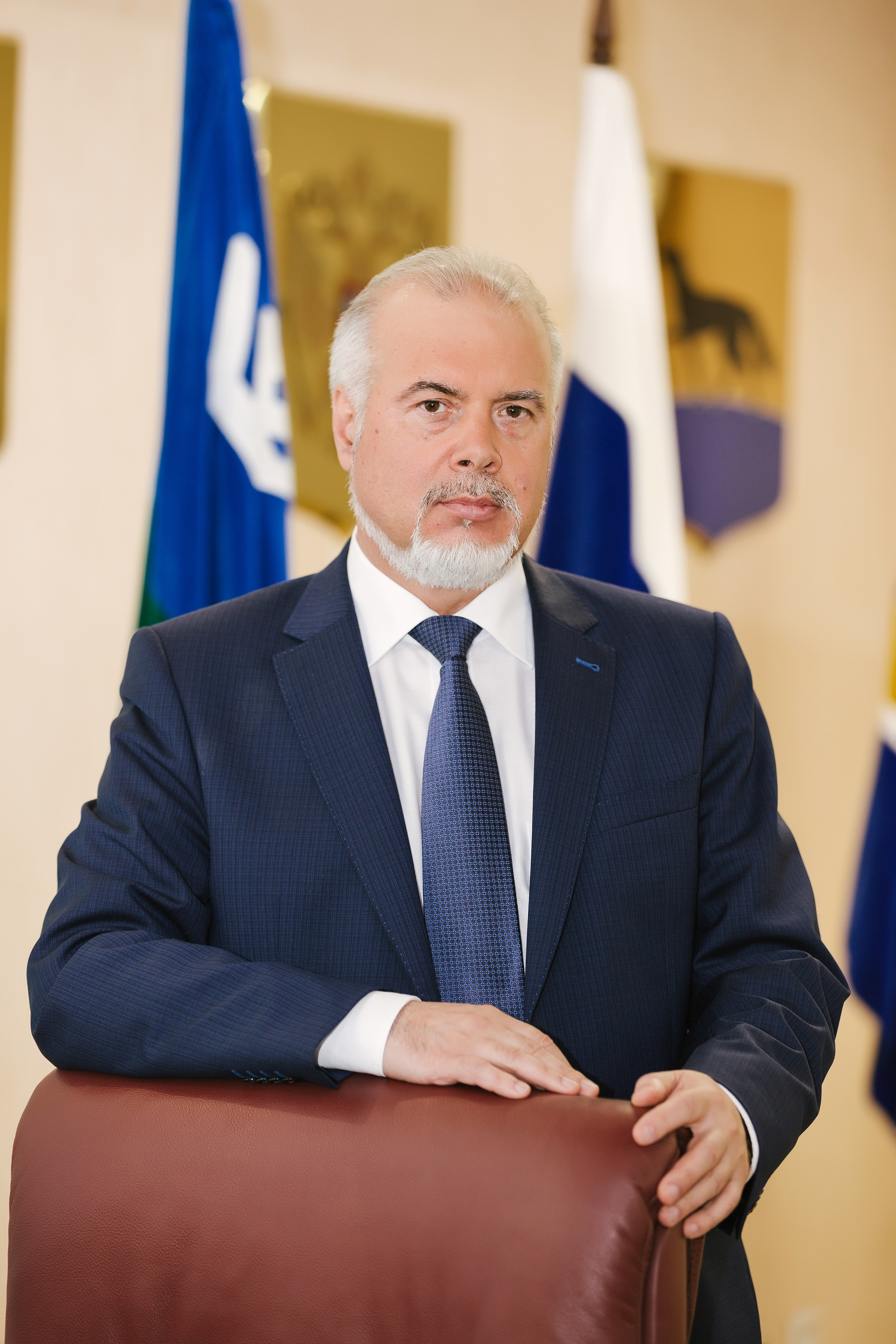

Member of the State Duma for the Khanty-Mansi Autonomous Okrug–Yugra
- Incumbent
- Assumed office 12 October 2021
- Preceded by: Aleksandr Sidorov
- Constituency: Nizhnevartovsk (No. 223)

Personal details
- Born: 17 February 1958 (age 68) Kokhma, Ivanovo Oblast, Russian SFSR, Soviet Union
- Party: United Russia
- Education: Ivanovo State Power Engineering University

Vadim Nikolaevich Shuvalov (Russian: Вадим Николаевич Шувалов; born 17 February 1958, Kokhma, Ivanovo Oblast) is a Russian political figure, a deputy of the 8th State Duma.

From 1989 to 2001, Shuvalov worked as Deputy Director for General Affairs of Surgut-1 Power Station. In 2001-2005, he headed the Surgut-1 Power Station. From 2007 to 2016, Shuvalov was the Deputy Executive Director for Prospective Development and, later, the Deputy General Director of Tyumenenergo. In 2006, he was elected deputy of the Surgut City Duma of the 4th convocation. From 2016 to 2020, he was the mayor of Surgut. From December 2020 to 2021, he was Deputy Governor of the Khanty-Mansi Autonomous Okrug. Since September 2021, he has served as deputy of the 8th State Duma.

== Sanctions ==
He was sanctioned by the UK government in 2022 in relation to the Russo-Ukrainian War.
