= Vladimir Aseev =

Russian politician

Member of the State Duma
- In office 24 March 2002 – 4 December 2011
- Preceded by: Alexander Ryazanov
- Constituency: Nizhnevartovsk (–2007)

Mayor of Langepas
- In office 1991–2000

Personal details
- Born: 19 June 1951 (age 74) Plotnikovo, Promyshlennovsky District, Kemerovo Oblast, RSFSR, Soviet Union

Vladimir Mikhaylovich Aseev (Russian: Владимир Михайлович Асеев; born 19 June 1951) is a Russian politician and member of the State Duma of the Russian Federation.

== Biography ==
He was born on June 19, 1951, in the village of Plotnikovo, Kemerovo Region.

== Education and employment ==
He graduated from the Novosibirsk Institute of Railway Engineers as a civil engineer in 1974. He began his career as a machine worker at a nitrogen-fertilizer plant in the city of Kemerovo (1966–1969).

From 1974 to 1976 as a conscript of the Soviet Army, he worked on the construction of the Baikal-Amur Mainline. From 1976 to 1982 he was master, foreman, chief engineer of the site, head of the site in the building and assembly department of the Sibakademstroy trust (Belokurikha, Altai Krai). In 1982 and 1983 he was the section chief and from 1983- 1987 he was chief engineer of construction management in Langepas.

From 1987 to 1991 he was the first deputy chairman, then the chairman of the executive committee of the Langepas City Council. From 1991 to 1996 - Mayor of Langepas. From 1996 to 2000 - the head of the local self-government of Langepas. In 2000-2002 - first deputy chairman of the Government of Khanty-Mansi Autonomous Okrug. Aseev supervised the construction, housing and transport.

On 24 March 2002, Aseev was elected member of the 3rd State Duma of Russia in the by-election in the Nizhnevartovsk constituency No. 221. He was reelected in 2003 and 2007. Currently serves as Deputy Head of the Ural Interregional Coordinating Council of United Russia (since 2007).

== Awards and titles ==
- honorary worker of the housing and utilities sector of Russia
- Medal of the Order of Merit for the Fatherland, I degree
- Medal of the Order of Merit for the Fatherland, II degree

== Family ==
He is married and has a son and a daughter.
