= Pokachi =

Pokachi Покачи
- Town
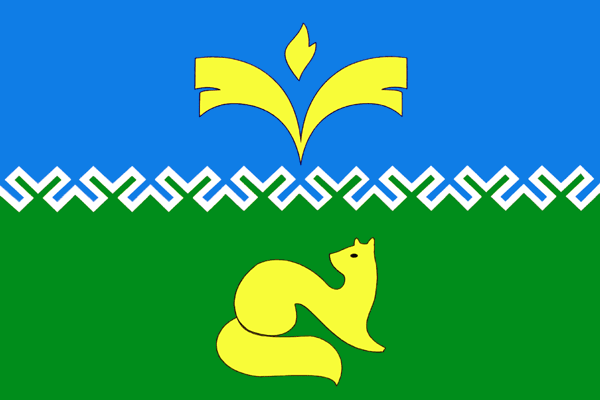
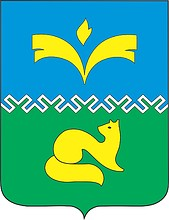
- Flag Coat of arms
- Interactive map of Pokachi
- Location of Pokachi Pokachi (Khanty–Mansi Autonomous Okrug)
- Coordinates: 61°45′N 75°35′E
- Country: Russia
- Federal subject: Khanty-Mansi Autonomous Okrug
- Founded: 1984
- Town status since: 1992
- Elevation: 55 m (180 ft)

Population (2010 Census)
  - Total: 17,171
  - Estimate (2021): 16,040 (−6.6%)

Administrative status
  - Subordinated to: town of okrug significance of Pokachi
  - Capital of: town of okrug significance of Pokachi

Municipal status
  - Urban okrug: Pokachi Urban Okrug
  - Capital of: Pokachi Urban Okrug
- Time zone: UTC+5 (MSK+2)
- Postal code: 628661
- OKTMO ID: 71884000001
- Website: www.admpokachi.ru

Pokachi (Russian: Покачи) is a town in Khanty–Mansi Autonomous Okrug, Russia, located on the right bank of the Vatyegan River, 350 kilometers (220 mi) east of Khanty-Mansiysk and 800 kilometers (500 mi) northeast of Tyumen. Population: 17,171 (2010 census); 17,017 (2002 census); 11,536 (1989 Soviet census).

== History ==
It was founded in 1984 due to the development of oil fields in its vicinity. It was granted town status in 1992. The name "Pokachi" is derived from the name of a Khanty family that once owned these lands.

== Administrative and municipal status ==
Within the framework of administrative divisions, it is incorporated as the town of okrug significance of Pokachi—an administrative unit with the status equal to that of the districts. As a municipal division, the town of okrug significance of Pokachi is incorporated as Pokachi Urban Okrug.

== Economy ==
The town's economy is based on oil extraction.
