= Vladimir Medvedev (politician) =

Russian politician

- Владимир Медведев
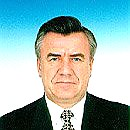

Leader of the Russian Regions group in the State Duma
- In office 14 March 1996 – 22 April 1997
- Succeeded by: Oleg Morozov

Leader of the New Regional Policy group in the State Duma
- In office 11 January 1994 – 17 January 1996

Member of the State Duma for Nizhnevartovsk
- In office 11 January 1994 – 18 January 2000
- Preceded by: Constituency established
- Succeeded by: Alexander Ryazanov

Deputy Head of Administration of Tyumen Oblast
- In office 1991–1992
- Governor: Yuri Shafranik

Personal details
- Born: Vladimir Sergeyevich Medvedev; 28 January 1948 Baku, Azerbaijani SSR, Soviet Union
- Died: 24 September 2018 (aged 70)
- Party: Socialist Party of Russia; Fatherland – All Russia

Vladimir Sergeyevich Medvedev (Russian: Владимир Сергеевич Медведев; 28 January 1948 – 24 September 2018), was an Azerbaijani-born Russian politician and engineer who had served as a Member of the State Duma from 1993 to 2003.

He also served as the deputy head of administration of the Tyumen Oblast from 1991 to 1992.

He had been the secretary of the CPSU party committee, general director of the Sibgazneftepererabotka association from 1986 to 1991.

== Biography ==
Vladimir Medvedev was born in Baku on 28 January 1948.

From 1966 to 1967 he worked at the Pervomayneft oil and gas production department of the Kuibyshevneft production association as a driver and mechanic.

From 1967 to 1969 he served in the Soviet Army.

Between 1969 and 1983, he worked at the Nizhnevartovsk gas processing plant as a driver, mechanic, driver, technician, and engineer.

In 1978, he received a higher technical education with a degree in mechanical engineer for oil and gas fields at the Kuibyshev Polytechnic Institute.

In 1983, he worked as deputy chief engineer of the Nizhnevartovsk gas processing plant.

In 1984, he worked at the Lokosovsky gas processing plant as a chief engineer.

In 1986, he worked as secretary of the CPSU party committee of the Sibgazneftepererabotka association.

In 1987, he was appointed general director of the Sibgazneftepererabotka association.

From 1991 to 1992, Medevdev served the deputy head of the administration of the Tyumen Oblast. In 1992, he was the head of the Union of Oil Industrialists of Russia.

In 1993, Medveddev was elected to the State Duma of the first convocation from the Nizhnevartovsk constituency No. 221. In the State Duma, he was a member of the Committee on Affairs of Public Associations and Religious Organizations, and was a member of the “New Regional Policy” deputy group.

In 1995, he was reelected to the State Duma of the second convocation from the Nizhnevartovsk constituency No. 221. In the State Duma of the second convocation he was a member of the committee on affairs of public associations and religious organizations, and was a member of the deputy group “Russian Regions”.

In 1999, he was elected to the State Duma of the third convocation on the lists of the Fatherland - All Russia electoral bloc. I n the State Duma of the third convocation, he was deputy chairman of the Committee on Energy, Transport and Communications, a member of the commission for the consideration of legal issues of subsoil use on the terms of production sharing, and was a member of the deputy group “Regions of Russia”.

After he left the State Duma in 2003, he was a member of the Board of Directors of JSC Russian Innovative Fuel and Energy Company.

Vladimir Sergeyevch Medvedev died on 24 September 2018.

== Legislative activity ==
During his tenure as a deputy of the State Duma of the 1st, 2nd and 3rd convocations, he co-authored 17 legislative initiatives and amendments to draft federal laws.
