= Pavel Zavalny =

Russian politician

Pavel Zavalny MP
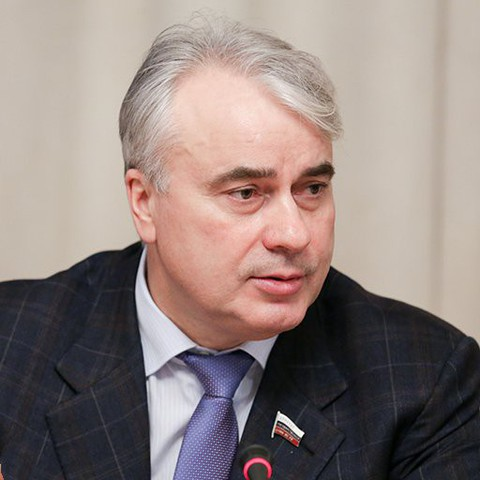

Member of the State Duma
- Incumbent
- Assumed office 21 December 2011
- Preceded by: Multi-member district
- Constituency: Khanty-Mansiysk (No. 222) (2016-); Party List (2011-2016)

Chairman of the State Duma committee on energy
- In office 21 April 2015 – 17 September 2024
- Succeeded by: Nikolay Shulginov

Personal details
- Born: 11 August 1961 (age 65) Khotkovo, Duminichsky District, Kaluga Oblast, Russian SFSR, Soviet Union
- Party: United Russia
- Education: Moscow Higher Technical School

Pavel Nikolayevich Zavalny (Russian: Павел Николаевич Завальный) is a Russian politician and businessman who has served as a deputy of the State Duma since 21 December 2011.

He was the chairman of the State Duma committee on energy from 2015 to 2024.

He is president of the Russian Gas Society since 2013 and was director general of Gazprom Transgas Yugorsk until May 2012.

== Sanctions ==
In December 2022 the EU sanctioned Pavel Zavalny in relation to the 2022 Russian invasion of Ukraine.
