= Boris Misnik =

Russian politician (1938–2021)

- Борис Мисник
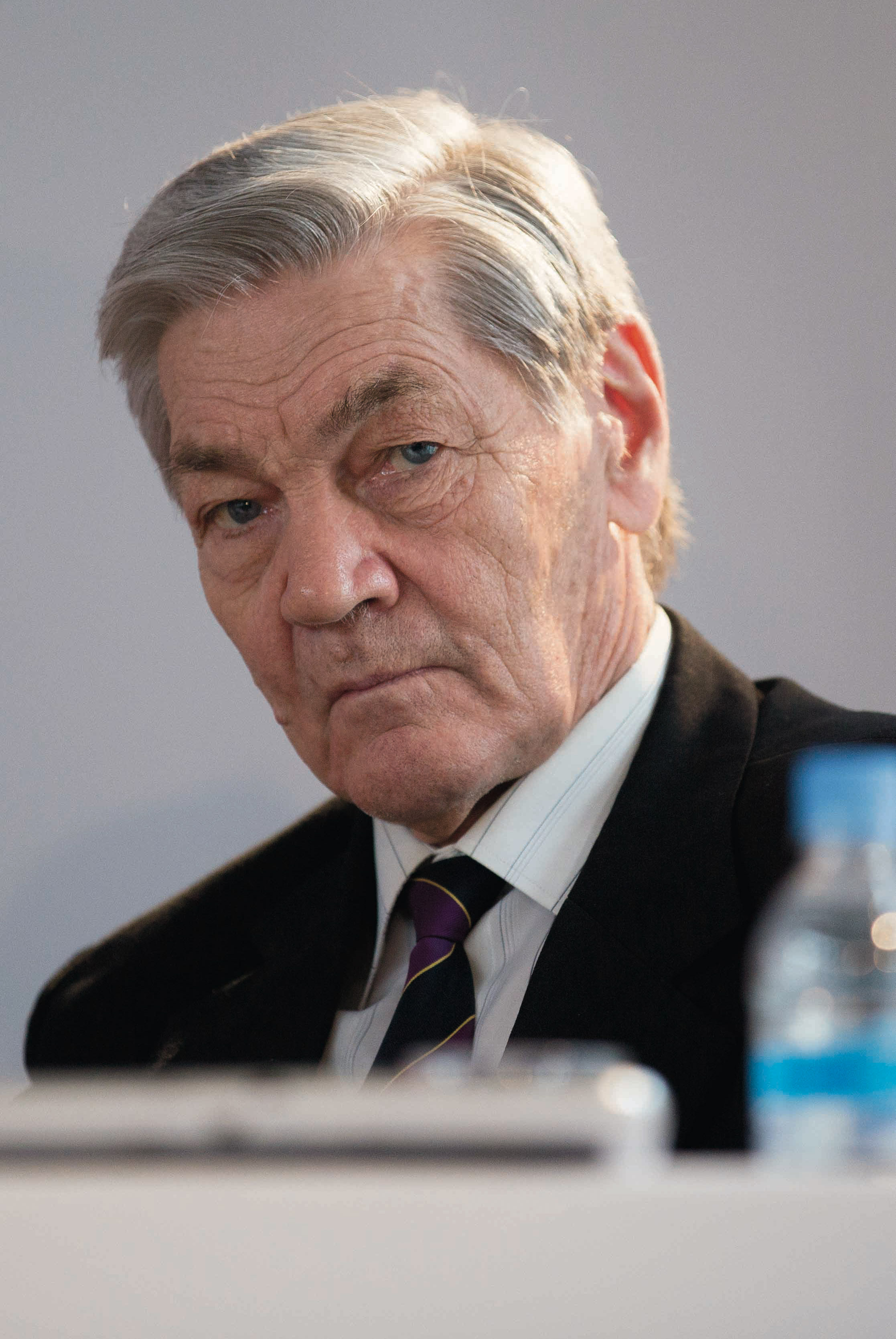
- Misnik in 2017

Deputy
- In office 17 December 1995 – 18 January 2000

Personal details
- Born: 30 July 1938 Imandra, Russian SFSR, Soviet Union
- Died: 4 December 2021 (aged 83)
- Party: Yabloko

Boris Misnik (Russian: Бори́с Григо́рьевич Ми́сник; 30 July 1938 – 4 December 2021) was a Russian politician. A member of the Yabloko party, he served in the State Duma from 1995 to 2000.
