= Langepas =

Langepas Лангепас Лаңкипос, Лӑӈкипос (Khanty)
- Town
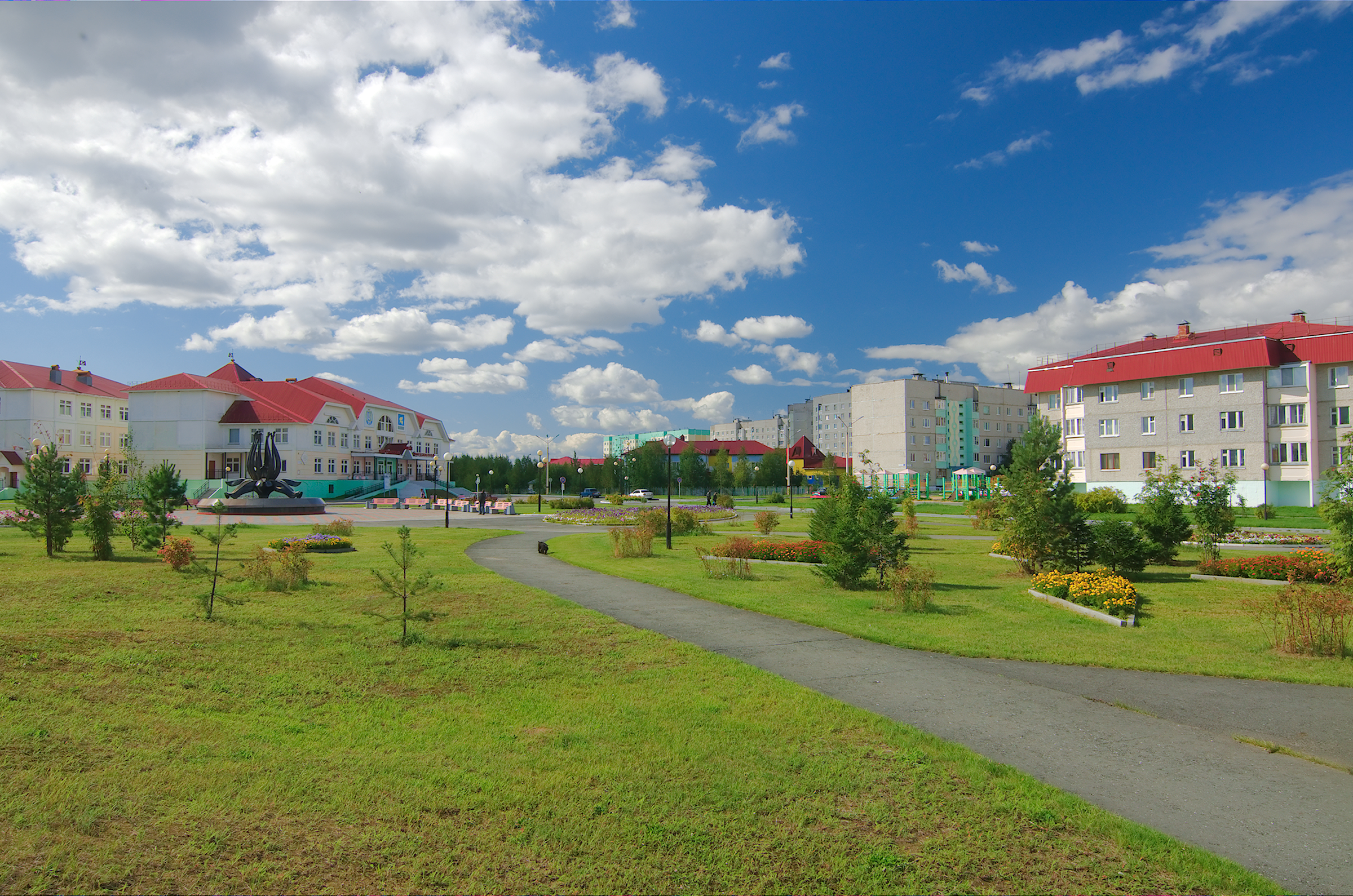

- Flag Coat of arms
- Interactive map of Langepas
- Location of Langepas Langepas (Khanty–Mansi Autonomous Okrug)
- Coordinates: 61°15′N 75°10′E
- Country: Russia
- Federal subject: Khanty-Mansi Autonomous Okrug
- Founded: 1980
- Town status since: 1985

Government
  - Body: Duma
- Elevation: 45 m (148 ft)

Population (2010 Census)
  - Total: 41,670
  - Estimate (2021): 42,701 (+2.5%)

Administrative status
  - Subordinated to: town of okrug significance of Langepas
  - Capital of: town of okrug significance of Langepas

Municipal status
  - Urban okrug: Langepas Urban Okrug
  - Capital of: Langepas Urban Okrug
- Time zone: UTC+5 (MSK+2)
- Postal codes: 628671, 628672
- OKTMO ID: 71872000001
- Website: www.admlangepas.ru

Langepas (Russian: Лангепас; Khanty: Лӑңкипос, Lăŋkipos) is a town in Khanty-Mansi Autonomous Okrug, Russia. Population: 41,670 (2010 census); 37,182 (2002 census); 25,618 (1989 Soviet census).

== Geography ==
Langepas lies on the Kayukovskaya riverbank, 15 kilometers (9.3 mi) north of the right bank of the Ob River, close to the mouth of the Vatinsky Yogan in the Ob. The town is located 545 kilometers (339 mi) east of Khanty-Mansiysk, and 875 kilometers (544 mi) northeast of Tyumen.

== History ==
Langepas means "squirrel land" in the Khanty language. It was established in 1980 and granted town status in 1985.. It was initially built as a settlement for the staff of the Lokosovo gas processing plant.

== Administrative and municipal status ==
Within the framework of administrative divisions, it is incorporated as the town of okrug significance of Langepas—an administrative unit with the status equal to that of the districts. As a municipal division, the town of okrug significance of Langepas is incorporated as Langepas Urban Okrug.

== Economy ==
The economy of the town is based on oil and natural gas extraction as initially it was founded by Lukoil. The oil company was named after the three western Siberian companies, which merged to form Lukoil: Langepasneftegaz, Urayneftegaz, and Kogalymneftegaz.
