= Alexander Ryazanov =

Russian businessman and politician

Alexander Nikolayevich Ryazanov

Member of the State Duma
- In office 19 December 1999 – November 2001
- Preceded by: Vladimir Medvedev
- Succeeded by: Vladimir Aseev
- Constituency: Nizhnevartovsk

Personal details
- Born: October 13, 1953 (age 72) Yuzhno-Kurilsk, Sakhalin Oblast, RSFSR, Soviet Union

Alexander Nikolayevich Ryazanov (Russian: Алекса́ндр Никола́евич Ряза́нов; born 13 October 1953 in Yuzhno-Kurilsk, Sakhalin Oblast, Russian SFSR, Soviet Union) is a Russian businessman and politician.

Born in Yuzhno-Kurilsk, Sakhalin Oblast.

== Business career ==
In 1988-1998 he was the CEO of the Surgut Gas Processing Factory.

From November 2001 to 16 November 2006, he was a First Deputy Chairman of the Board of Directors of Gazprom.

From October 2005 to November 2006, he was the President of Sibneft (Gazprom Neft).

Since July 2004 Ryazanov has been a member of the Coordination Committee of RosUkrEnergo.

== Elected office ==
In 2000-2001 Alexander Ryazanov was a deputy of the State Duma.
