= Abatsky District =

Abatsky District Абатский район (Russian)
- District
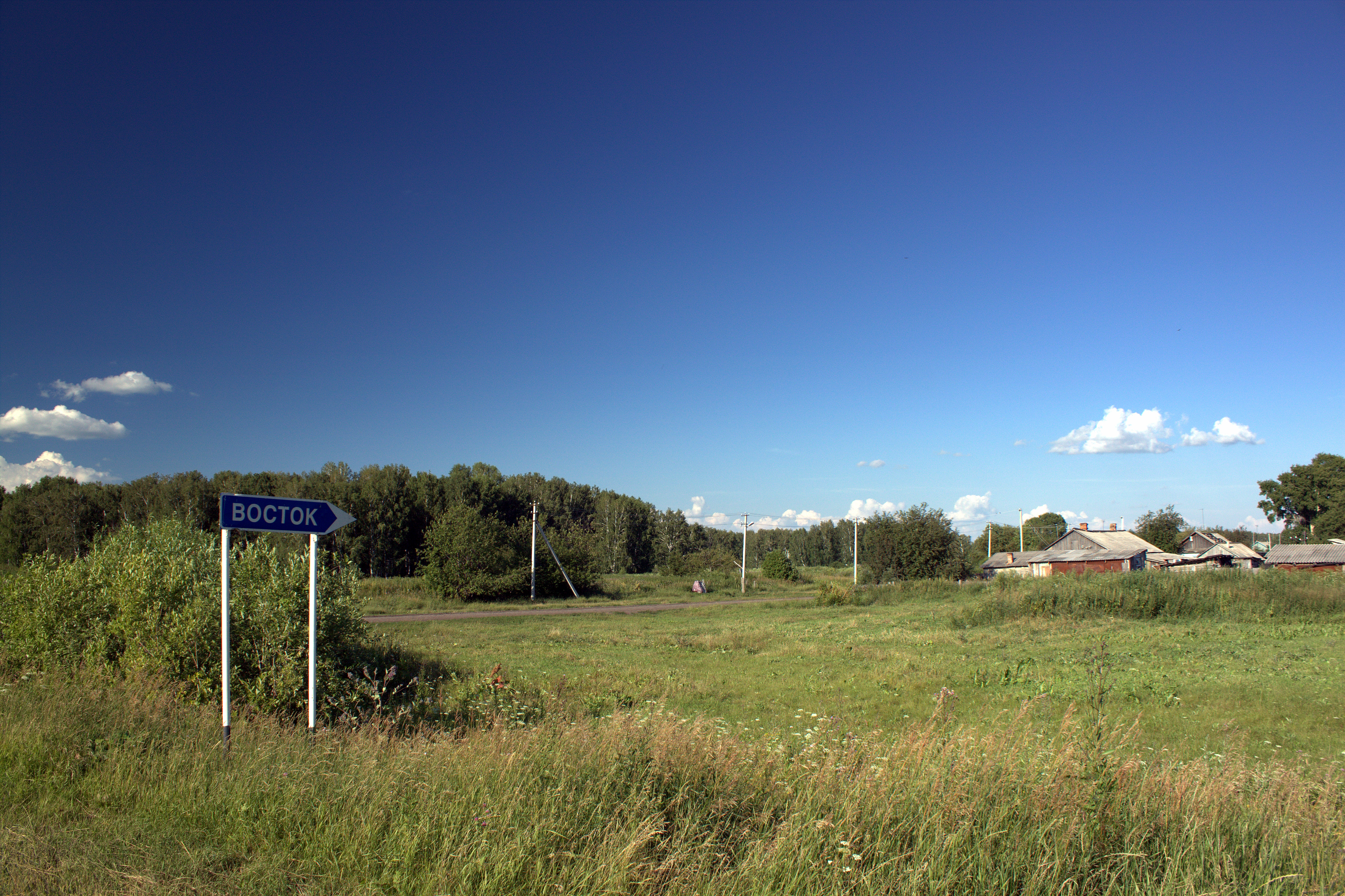
- Village of Vostok, Abatsky District

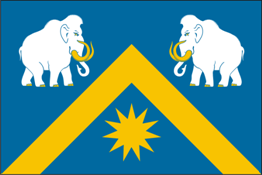
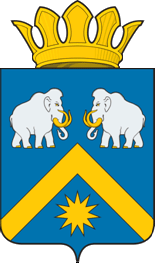
- Flag Coat of arms
- Location of Abatsky District in Tyumen Oblast
- Coordinates: 56°17′N 70°27′E
- Country: Russia
- Federal subject: Tyumen Oblast
- Established: 12 November 1923
- Administrative center: Abatskoye

Area
  - Total: 4,080 km^{2} (1,580 sq mi)

Population (2010 Census)
  - Total: 19,837
  - Density: 4.86/km^{2} (12.6/sq mi)
  - Urban: 0%
  - Rural: 100%

Administrative structure
  - Administrative divisions: 11 Rural okrugs
  - Inhabited localities: 65 rural localities

Municipal structure
  - Municipally incorporated as: Abatsky Municipal District
  - Municipal divisions: 0 urban settlements, 11 rural settlements
- Time zone: UTC+5 (MSK+2)
- OKTMO ID: 71603000
- Website: https://abatsk.admtyumen.ru/mo/Abatsk/index.htm

Abatsky District (Russian: Аба́тский райо́н) is an administrative district (raion), one of the twenty-two in Tyumen Oblast, Russia. As a municipal division, it is incorporated as Abatsky Municipal District. It is located in the southeast of the oblast. The area of the district is 4,080 square kilometers (1,580 sq mi). Its administrative center is the rural locality (a selo) of Abatskoye. Population: 19,837 (2010 Census); 23,566 (2002 census); 26,453 (1989 Soviet census). The population of Abatskoye accounts for 40.1% of the district's total population.

== Geography ==
Abatsky District is located in the southeast of Tyumen Oblast, supporting mostly agricultural land on forest-steppe terrain of the West Siberian Plain. The district is in the Ural Federal District, on the west side of the border with the Siberian Federal District. The Ishim River runs from south to north through the middle of the district, about 130 km south of where it enters the Irtysh River to the north. The Trans-Siberian Railway runs through the middle of the district from west to east, passing through the administrative center of Abatskoye. Abatsky District is 280 km southeast of the city of Tyumen, 185 km northwest of the city of Omsk, and 2,000 km east of Moscow. The area measures 70 km (north-south), 60 km (west-east); total area is 4,080 km2 (about 0.003% of Tyumen Oblast).

The district is bordered on the north by Vikulovsky District, on the east by Krutinsky District of Omsk Oblast, on the south by Sladkovsky District, and on the west by Ishimsky District.

== History ==
The first Russian presence was as part of a string of security posts along the Ishim River in the 1600s, as a defense against Siberian Tatars. The settlement of Abatskoye is believed to have been formed in 1695. By 1710, the population in 9 villages was reported as 177 households (473 male, 402 female individuals). Incoming settlers from central Russia were attracted to the farmland, and with involuntary conscripts added the population grew. By the 1800s, Abatskoye had become a significant crossroads market town.

The district was formally created November 12, 1923 as part of the Ishim district of the Ural region. On January 1,1932, the District abolished, and became part of Maslyansky District. On January 25,1935, the District was formed again as part of Omsk Oblast, and on August 14, 1944 by decree of the USSR Supreme Soviet Presidium, Abatsky District was included in Tyumen Oblast
