= Evgeny Markov (politician) =

Russian politician

Evgeny Markov MP
- Евгений Марков
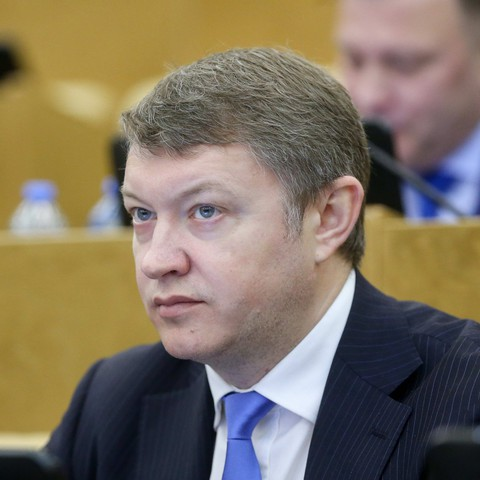
- Markov in 2019

Member of the State Duma (Party List Seat)
- Incumbent
- Assumed office 4 April 2019
- Preceded by: Vladimir Sysoev

Personal details
- Born: 8 November 1973 (age 52) Abatskoye, Tyumen Oblast, RSFSR, Soviet Union
- Party: Liberal Democratic Party of Russia
- Education: University of Tyumen

Evgeny Vladimirovich Markov (Russian: Евгений Владимирович Марков; born 11 November 1973, Abatskoye) is a Russian political figure and a deputy of the 7th, and 8th State Dumas.

From 1994 to 1996, he worked as an economist at the Tyumen credit bank. From 1996 to 1999, he continued working as an economist in a number of different banks, including the investment bank Diplomat. In 1999, he started working at the administration of the Khanty-Mansi Autonomous Okrug. From 1999 to 2004, Markov served as Deputy Chairman of the Committee on Economic Policy, Deputy Director of the Department of Economic Policy, and Director of the Department of Investments, Science and Technology of the region. From 2007 to 2008, he was the deputy of the Duma of the Sovetsky District. In 2011, he became the deputy of the Duma of the Khanty-Mansiysk Autonomous Okrug - Yugra of the 5th convocation. From 2019 to 2021, he was the deputy of the 7th State Duma; he received a vacant mandate from Vladimir Sysoev. Since September 2021, he has served as deputy of the 8th State Duma.
