= Bely Yar, Khanty-Mansi Autonomous Okrug =

Bely Yar Белый Яр
- Urban-type settlement
- Interactive map of Bely Yar
- Location of Bely Yar Bely Yar (Khanty–Mansi Autonomous Okrug)
- Coordinates: 61.2650°N 73.2587°E
- Country: Russia
- Federal subject: Khanty-Mansi Autonomous Okrug
- Administrative district: Surgutsky District
- Founded: 1930

Population (2010 Census)
  - Total: 14,580
  - Estimate (2021): 16,141 (+10.7%)
- Time zone: UTC+5 (MSK+2)
- Postal code: 628433
- OKTMO ID: 71826155051

Bely Yar (Russian: Белый Яр) is an urban locality (an urban-type settlement) in Surgutsky District of Khanty-Mansi Autonomous Okrug, Russia. Population: 14,580 (2010 census); 14,392 (2002 census); 13,004 (1989 Soviet census).
