= Abatskoye =

Abatskoye Абатское
- Selo
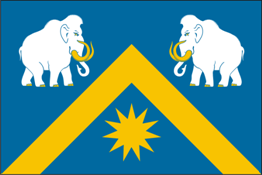
- Flag
- Interactive map of Abatskoye
- Location of Abatskoye Abatskoye (Tyumen Oblast)
- Coordinates: 56°17′11″N 70°26′47″E
- Country: Russia
- Federal subject: Tyumen Oblast
- Administrative district: Abatsky District
- SettlementSelsoviet: Abatskoye Settlement
- Founded: 1680
- Elevation: 75 m (246 ft)

Population (2010 Census)
  - Total: 7,959
  - Estimate (2021): 8,094 (+1.7%)

Administrative status
  - Capital of: Abatsky District, Abatskoye Settlement

Municipal status
  - Municipal district: Abatsky Municipal District
  - Rural settlement: Abatskoye Rural Settlement
  - Capital of: Abatsky Municipal District, Abatskoye Rural Settlement
- Time zone: UTC+5 (MSK+2)
- Postal code: 627540
- OKTMO ID: 71603402101

Abatskoye (Russian: Абатское) is a rural locality (a selo) and the administrative center of Abatsky District of Tyumen Oblast, Russia. Population: 7,959 (2010 census); 8,248 (2002 census); 8,578 (1989 Soviet census).
