= Khanty-Mansiysky District =

Khanty-Mansiysky District Ханты-Мансийский район (Russian)
- District
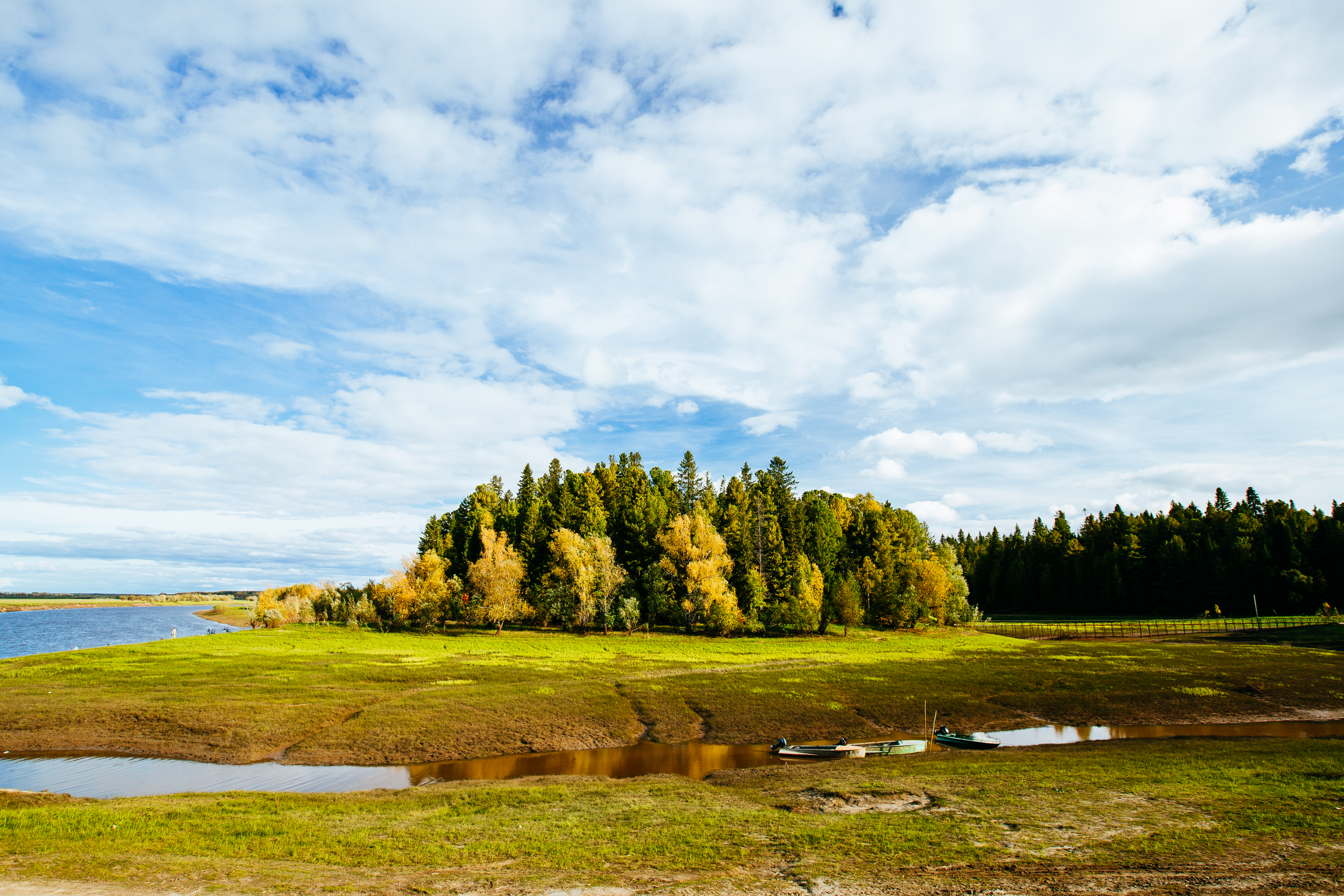
- Village Shapsha, Khanty-Mansiysky District

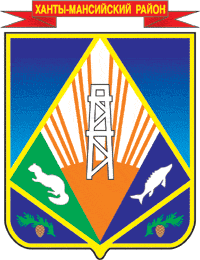
- Flag Coat of arms
- Location of Khanty-Mansiysky District in Khanty-Mansi Autonomous Okrug
- Coordinates: 61°00′N 69°00′E
- Country: Russia
- Federal subject: Khanty-Mansi Autonomous Okrug
- Established: 1923
- Administrative center: Khanty-Mansiysk

Area
  - Total: 46,400 km^{2} (17,900 sq mi)

Population (2010 Census)
  - Total: 19,362
  - Density: 0.417/km^{2} (1.08/sq mi)
  - Urban: 0%
  - Rural: 100%

Administrative structure
  - Inhabited localities: 29 rural localities

Municipal structure
  - Municipally incorporated as: Khanty-Mansiysky Municipal District
  - Municipal divisions: 0 urban settlements, 12 rural settlements
- Time zone: UTC+5 (MSK+2)
- OKTMO ID: 71829000
- Website: http://hmrn.ru

Population of Khanty-Mansiysky District
- 2010 Census: 19,362
- 2002 Census: 17,015
- 1989 Census: 20,212
- 1979 Census: 17,784

Khanty-Mansiysky District (Russian: Ха́нты-Манси́йский райо́н) is an administrative and municipal district (raion), one of the nine in Khanty-Mansi Autonomous Okrug, Russia. It is located in the center of the autonomous okrug. The area of the district is 46,400 square kilometers (17,900 sq mi). Its administrative center is the town of Khanty-Mansiysk (which is not administratively a part of the district). As of the 2010 Census, the total population of the district was 19,362.

== Administrative and municipal status ==
Within the framework of administrative divisions, Khanty-Mansiysky District is one of the nine in the autonomous okrug. The town of Khanty-Mansiysk serves as its administrative center, despite being incorporated separately as a town of okrug significance—an administrative unit with the status equal to that of the districts.

As a municipal division, the district is incorporated as Khanty-Mansiysky Municipal District. The town of okrug significance of Khanty-Mansiysk is incorporated separately from the district as Khanty-Mansiysk Urban Okrug.
