= Nefteyugansky District =

Nefteyugansky District Нефтеюганский район (Russian)
- District
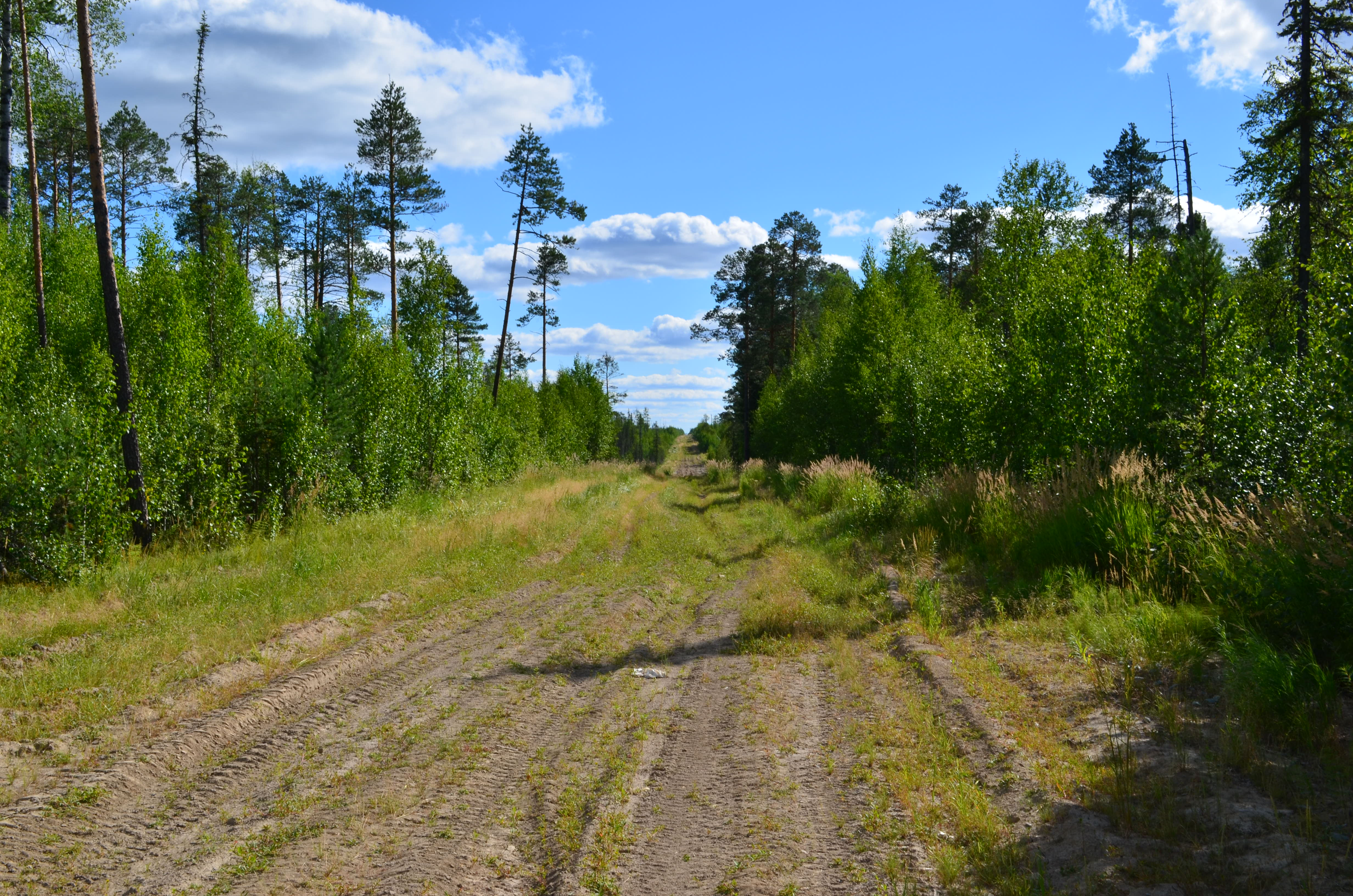
- Road to a quarry, Nefteyugansky District

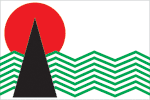
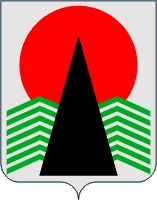
- Flag Coat of arms
- Location of Nefteyugansky District in Khanty-Mansi Autonomous Okrug
- Coordinates: 61°06′N 72°36′E
- Country: Russia
- Federal subject: Khanty-Mansi Autonomous Okrug
- Established: 1980
- Administrative center: Nefteyugansk

Area
  - Total: 24,550 km^{2} (9,480 sq mi)

Population (2010 Census)
  - Total: 44,815
  - Density: 1.825/km^{2} (4.728/sq mi)
  - Urban: 57.1%
  - Rural: 42.9%

Administrative structure
  - Inhabited localities: 1 urban-type settlements, 10 rural localities

Municipal structure
  - Municipally incorporated as: Nefteyugansky Municipal District
  - Municipal divisions: 1 urban settlements, 7 rural settlements
- Time zone: UTC+5 (MSK+2)
- OKTMO ID: 71818000
- Website: http://www.admoil.ru/

Nefteyugansky District (Russian: Нефтеюга́нский райо́н) is an administrative and municipal district (raion), one of the nine in Khanty-Mansi Autonomous Okrug, Russia. It is located in the south of the autonomous okrug. The area of the district is 24,550 square kilometers (9,480 sq mi). Its administrative center is the city of Nefteyugansk (which is not administratively a part of the district). Population: 44,815 (2010 Census); 45,354 (2002 census); 61,161 (1989 Soviet census).

== Administrative and municipal status ==
Within the framework of administrative divisions, Nefteyugansky District is one of the nine in the autonomous okrug. The city of Nefteyugansk serves as its administrative center, despite being incorporated separately as a city of okrug significance—an administrative unit with the status equal to that of the districts.

As a municipal division, the district is incorporated as Nefteyugansky Municipal District. The city of okrug significance of Nefteyugansk is incorporated separately from the district as Nefteyugansk Urban Okrug.
