= Khanty-Mansiysk =

Khanty-Mansiysk Ханты-Мансийск
- Town

Other transcription(s)
  - Khanty: Ёмвоҷ
  - Mansi: Абга
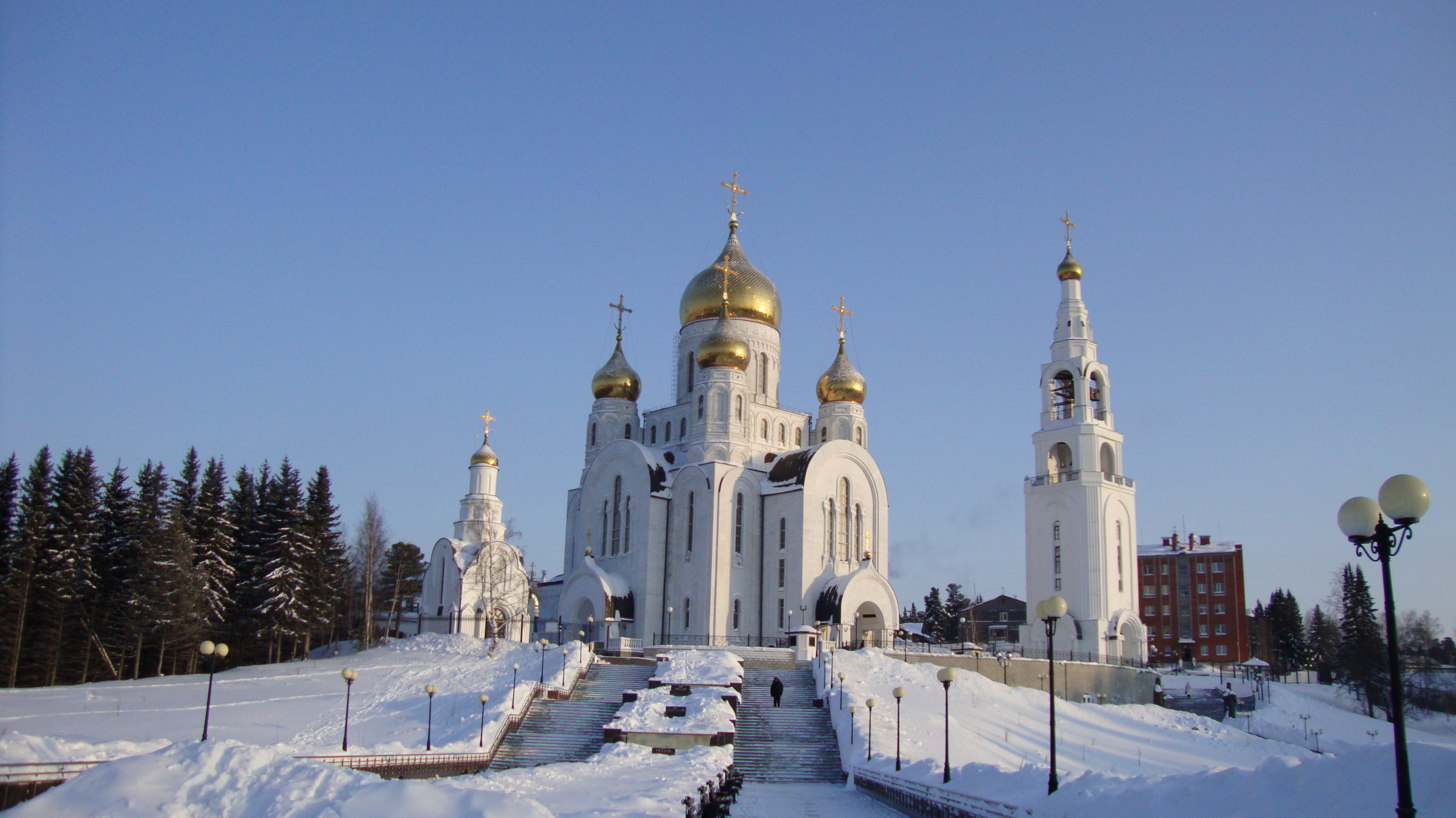
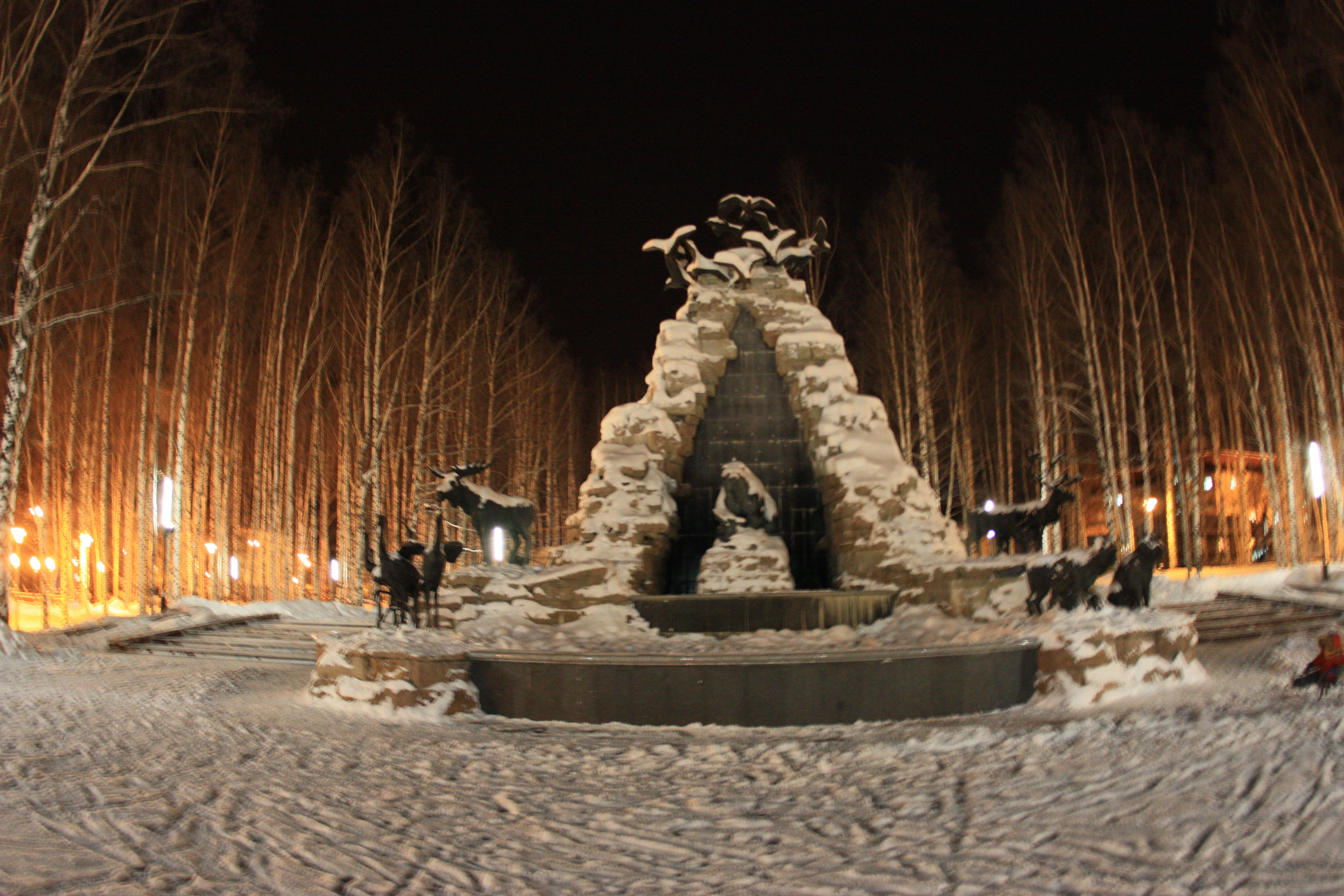
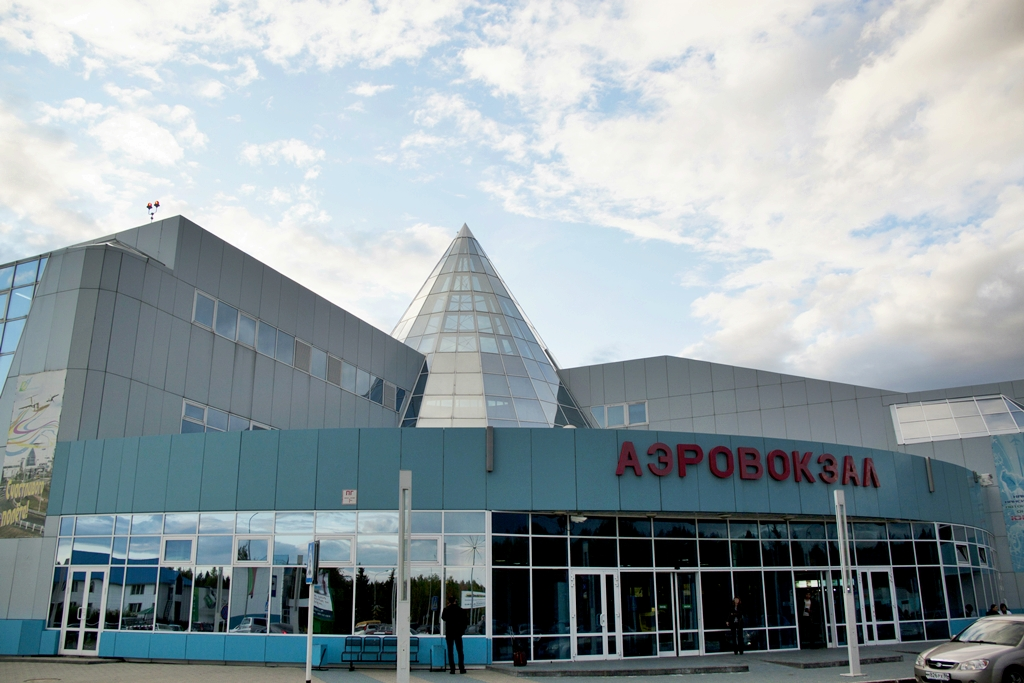
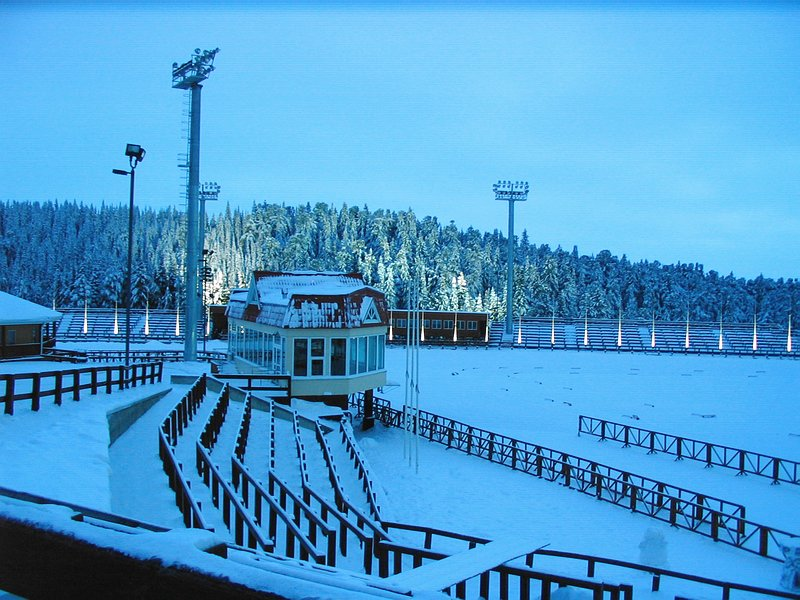
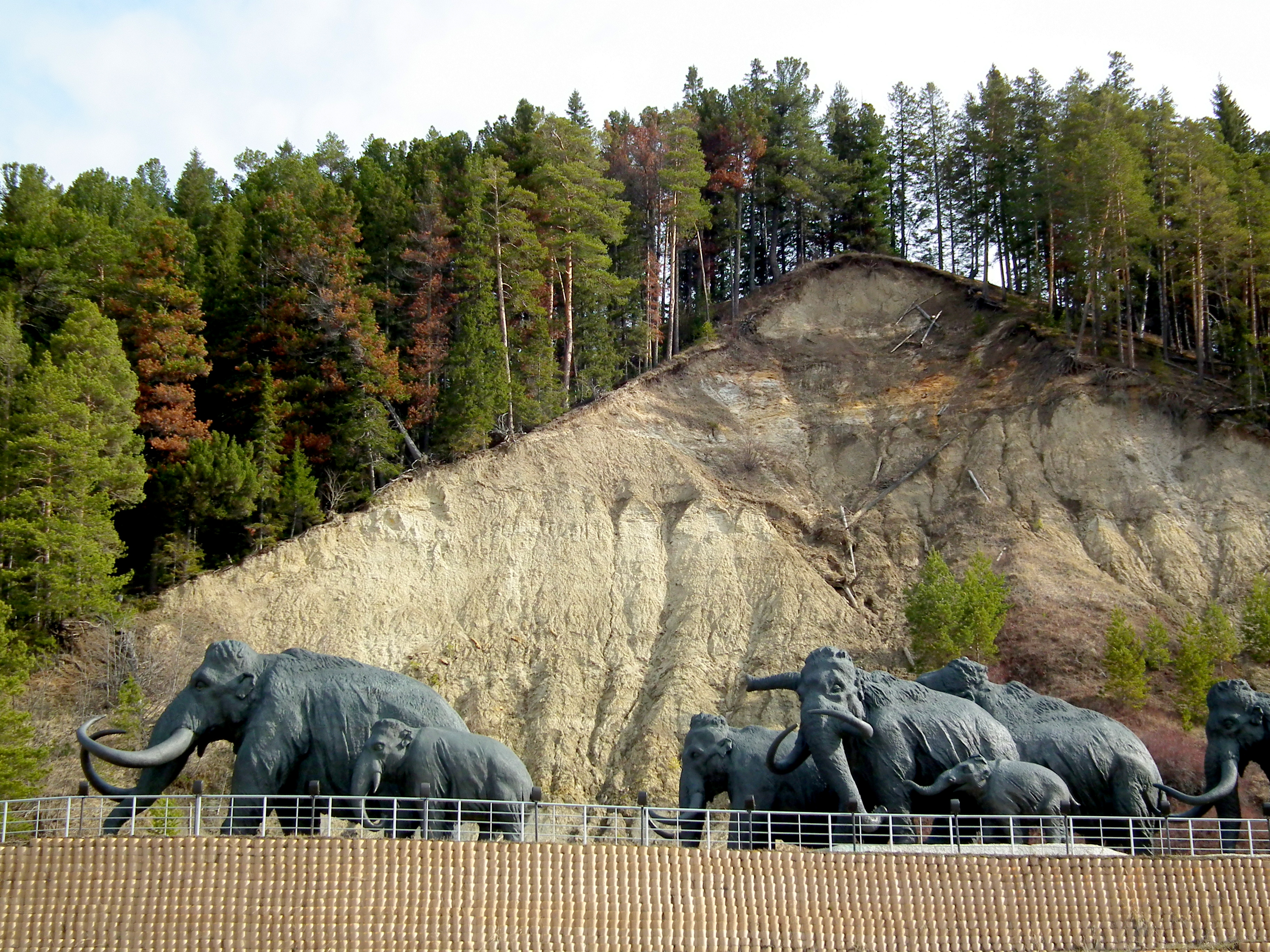
- From top down, left to right: Church of the Resurrection, Boris Losev Park, Khanty-Mansiysk Airport, Khanty-Mansiysk Biathlone Center, Archaeopark

- Flag Coat of arms
- Interactive map of Khanty-Mansiysk
- Location of Khanty-Mansiysk Khanty-Mansiysk (Khanty–Mansi Autonomous Okrug)
- Coordinates: 61°00′N 69°00′E
- Country: Russia
- Federal subject: Khanty-Mansi Autonomous Okrug
- Founded: 1930
- Town status since: 1950

Government
  - Head: Maxim Ryashin
- Elevation: 50 m (160 ft)

Population (2010 Census)
  - Total: 80,151
  - Estimate (2025): 101,466 (+26.6%)
  - Rank: 207th in 2010

Administrative status
  - Subordinated to: town of okrug significance of Khanty-Mansiysk
  - Capital of: Khanty-Mansi Autonomous Okrug, Khanty-Mansiysky District

Municipal status
  - Urban okrug: Khanty-Mansiysk Urban Okrug
  - Capital of: Khanty-Mansiysk Urban Okrug, Khanty-Mansiysky Municipal District
- Time zone: UTC+5 (MSK+2)
- Postal code: 628000
- Dialing code: +7 3467
- OKTMO ID: 71871000001
- Website: web.archive.org/web/20090908222141/http://www.admhmansy.ru/ru/

Khanty-Mansiysk (Russian: Ха́нты-Манси́йск; Khanty: Ёмвоҷ, Jomvoćś; Mansi: Абга, Abga) is a city in west-central Siberia in Russia. It lies on the eastern bank of the Irtysh River, 15 kilometers (9.3 mi) from its confluence with the Ob, in the oil-rich region of Western Siberia. Though it is an independent city, Khanty-Mansiysk also functions as the administrative centre of Khanty-Mansiysky District, and the administrative center of Khanty-Mansi Autonomous Okrug–Yugra.

With 101,466 estimated inhabitants, Khanty-Mansiysk is among Russia's few regional capitals that are not the largest cities in their surrounding area, as it is surpassed in population by Surgut, Nizhnevartovsk and Nefteyugansk.

== Etymology ==
The name of the city combines the names of two Russian indigenous peoples local to the region, the Khanty and the Mansi, ending in "-sk" as is typical for the names of Russian towns, which means city. Before 1940, the settlement's name was Ostyako-Vogulsk, as these tribes were previously known as the Ostyaks and the Voguls, respectively.

== Geography ==
=== Climate ===
Khanty-Mansiysk experiences a subarctic climate (Köppen climate classification Dfc), featuring short summers, and cold winters. The climate is extreme, with temperatures as low as −49 °C (−56 °F) and as high as +34.5 °C (94.1 °F). On average, however, the region is very cold, with an average temperature of −1.1 °C (30.0 °F). Precipitation tends to be fairly low; 553 millimeters (21.8 in) per year, which is heavier in the summer than in the winter. The average wind speed is 2.4 meters per second (7.9 ft/s), and the average humidity is 77%.

Climate data for Khanty-Mansiysk (1991–2020, extremes 1892–present)
Month	Jan	Feb	Mar	Apr	May	Jun	Jul	Aug	Sep	Oct	Nov	Dec	Year
Record high °C (°F)	2.7 (36.9)	4.5 (40.1)	13.0 (55.4)	25.1 (77.2)	34.5 (94.1)	34.5 (94.1)	34.7 (94.5)	33.2 (91.8)	27.3 (81.1)	20.4 (68.7)	8.7 (47.7)	3.1 (37.6)	34.7 (94.5)
Mean daily maximum °C (°F)	−15.2 (4.6)	−12.8 (9.0)	−3.3 (26.1)	4.7 (40.5)	13.7 (56.7)	20.3 (68.5)	22.9 (73.2)	19.0 (66.2)	12.2 (54.0)	3.7 (38.7)	−7.2 (19.0)	−12.8 (9.0)	3.8 (38.8)
Daily mean °C (°F)	−19.1 (−2.4)	−16.7 (1.9)	−7.8 (18.0)	0.0 (32.0)	8.3 (46.9)	15.4 (59.7)	18.2 (64.8)	14.5 (58.1)	8.2 (46.8)	0.7 (33.3)	−10.4 (13.3)	−16.6 (2.1)	−0.4 (31.3)
Mean daily minimum °C (°F)	−23 (−9)	−20.6 (−5.1)	−12.1 (10.2)	−4.3 (24.3)	3.4 (38.1)	11.0 (51.8)	13.7 (56.7)	10.6 (51.1)	4.7 (40.5)	−2.1 (28.2)	−13.6 (7.5)	−20.5 (−4.9)	−4.4 (24.1)
Record low °C (°F)	−49 (−56)	−46.5 (−51.7)	−40.1 (−40.2)	−28.6 (−19.5)	−14.9 (5.2)	−4.6 (23.7)	1.2 (34.2)	−1 (30)	−7.5 (18.5)	−28.6 (−19.5)	−43.4 (−46.1)	−49 (−56)	−49 (−56)
Average precipitation mm (inches)	29 (1.1)	25 (1.0)	30 (1.2)	30 (1.2)	43 (1.7)	61 (2.4)	72 (2.8)	84 (3.3)	56 (2.2)	47 (1.9)	38 (1.5)	34 (1.3)	549 (21.6)
Average extreme snow depth cm (inches)	41 (16)	50 (20)	53 (21)	24 (9.4)	1 (0.4)	0 (0)	0 (0)	0 (0)	0 (0)	2 (0.8)	13 (5.1)	27 (11)	53 (21)
Average rainy days	0.3	1	2	10	18	19	17	20	21	15	3	1	127
Average snowy days	27	25	21	15	7	1	0	0.1	4	16	26	28	170
Average relative humidity (%)	83	81	76	69	65	66	71	78	81	83	85	84	77
Mean monthly sunshine hours	18.9	91.5	166.2	224.5	270.1	287.0	313.5	216.3	127.5	74.1	33.6	1.6	1,824.8
Source 1: Pogoda.ru.net
Source 2: NOAA

== History ==
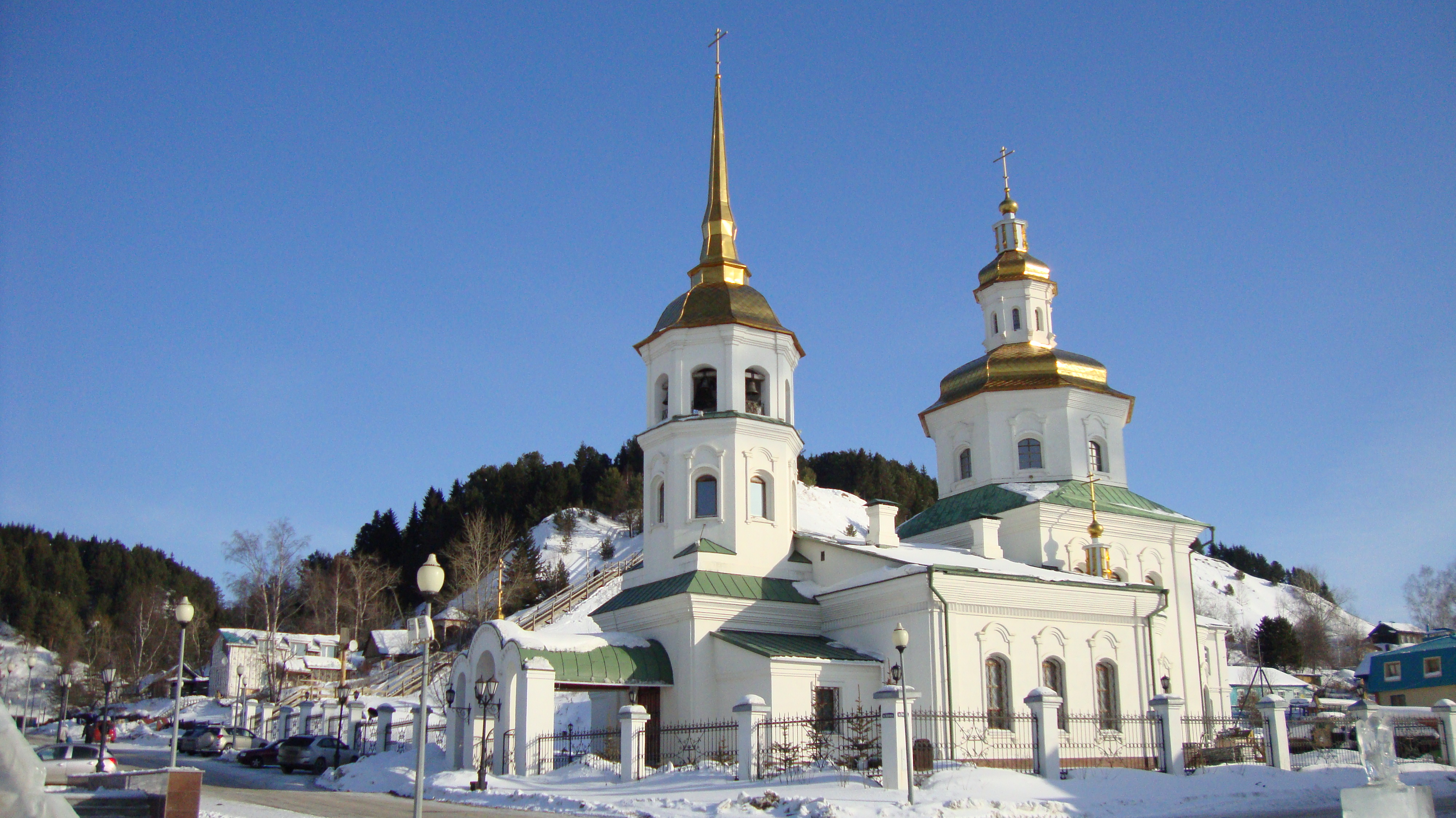
Church of the Intercession of the Theotokos

It was founded in 1930 as a work settlement of Ostyako-Vogulsk (Остяко-Вогульск), around an existing village.

The Church of the Intercession of the Theotokos in Samarovo is an historic church in the city. The original church was built sometime after 1582; in Kungur Chronicles, Cossack Yermak, defeated Khan Kuchum’s army under Tobolsk, after praying for the days. A stone structure was built in 1816, designed by an architect named Shangin. During the years of Soviet regime, the church was plundered. In 1994, excavations were organized and the foundation of the church was discovered. On the Feast of Nativity of the Most Holy Theotokos on September 21, 1996, priest Sergiy Kravtsov held a public prayer and works on restoration of the church of the Intercession of the Most Holy Theotokos started. In 2001, the church was consecrated and Patriarch of Moscow and All Russia, Alexy II of Moscow, visited it the same year.

== Administrative and municipal status ==
Khanty-Mansiysk is the administrative centre of the autonomous okrug and, within the framework of administrative divisions, it also serves as the administrative centre of Khanty-Mansiysky District, even though it is not a part of it. As an administrative division, it is incorporated separately as the town of okrug significance of Khanty-Mansiysk—an administrative unit with the status equal to that of the districts. As a municipal division, the town of okrug significance of Khanty-Mansiysk is incorporated as Khanty-Mansiysk Urban Okrug.

== Demographics ==
Historical population
Year	Pop.	±%
1939	7,488	—
1959	20,677	+176.1%
1970	24,754	+19.7%
1979	28,266	+14.2%
1989	34,462	+21.9%
2002	53,953	+56.6%
2010	80,151	+48.6%
2021	107,473	+34.1%
Source: Census data

Population: 107,473 (2021 census); 80,151 (2010 census); 53,953 (2002 census); 34,462 (1989 Soviet census). Ethnic composition (2010):

- Russians – 73%
- Tatars – 5.3%
- Khanty – 3.9%
- Ukrainians – 3.1%
- Tajiks – 2.0%
- Azeris – 2.0%
- Mansi – 1.6%
- Kyrgyz – 1.3%
- Uzbeks – 1.2%
- Others – 6.6%

== Transportation ==
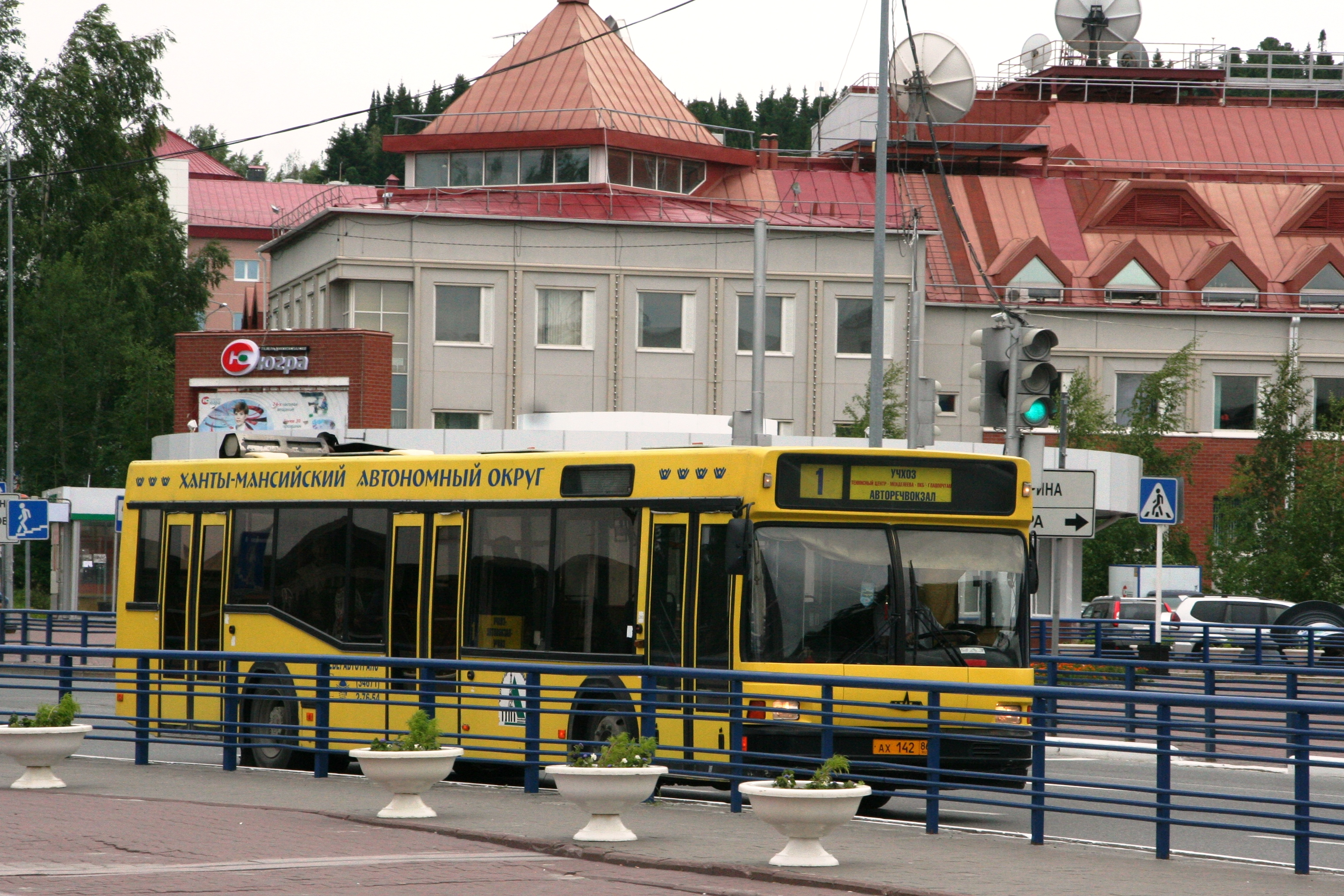
MAZ-103 bus

Air travel is available at the Khanty-Mansiysk Airport, located just outside Khanty-Mansiysk inner city. The airline Utair has its head office at the airport.

== Sports ==
Khanty-Mansiysk is a skiing and alpine skiing centre. Biathlon World Cup competitions are annually held in the city, and tourism infrastructure has been developed here quite well. The city was the venue of the 2003 and 2011 Biathlon World Championships, and in 2005 the first Mixed Biathlon Relay Championships took place here, and again in 2010. The 2011 IPC Biathlon and Cross-Country Skiing World Championships where skiers with a physical disability compete, took place in Khanty-Mansiysk in March–April 2011 as well.

Khanty-Mansiysk was home to the 2015 Winter Deaflympics and the HC Yugra of the Supreme Hockey League.

The city includes the Ugra Chess Academy, which has been the venue of the 2010 Chess Olympiad and the Women's World Chess Championship 2012. In 2010, the Olympic Hotel was built just to house the players in the Olympiad. It also hosted the 2005 Chess World Cup, the 2007 Chess World Cup, the 2009 Chess World Cup, the 2011 Chess World Cup, and the 2019 Chess World Cup. It hosted the World Rapid and Blitz Championship in 2013 and the 2014 Candidates Tournament.

In May 2015, the FIDE Grand Prix tournament was held here. The 2018 FIDE Women's World Championship was held here on November 2–23, 2018. It included 64 chess players from 28 countries and was won by Ju Wenjun.

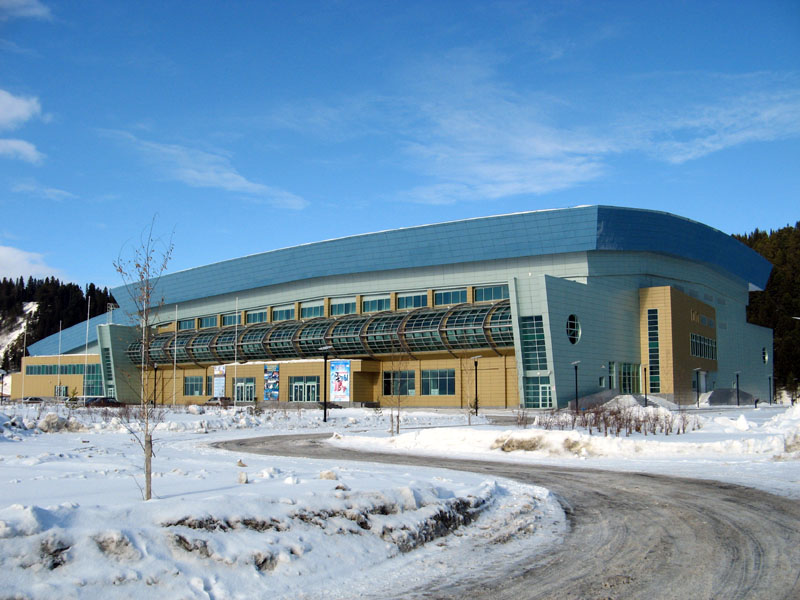
Ice Palace

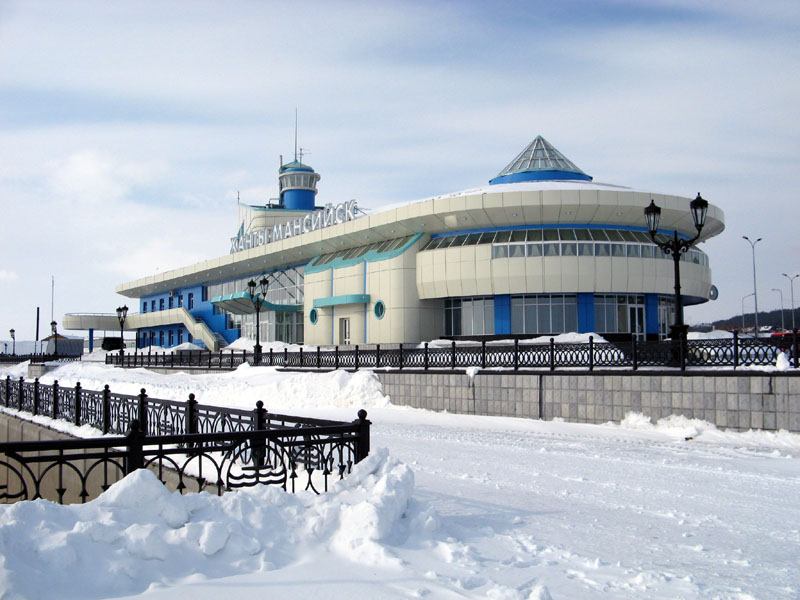
River port and bus station

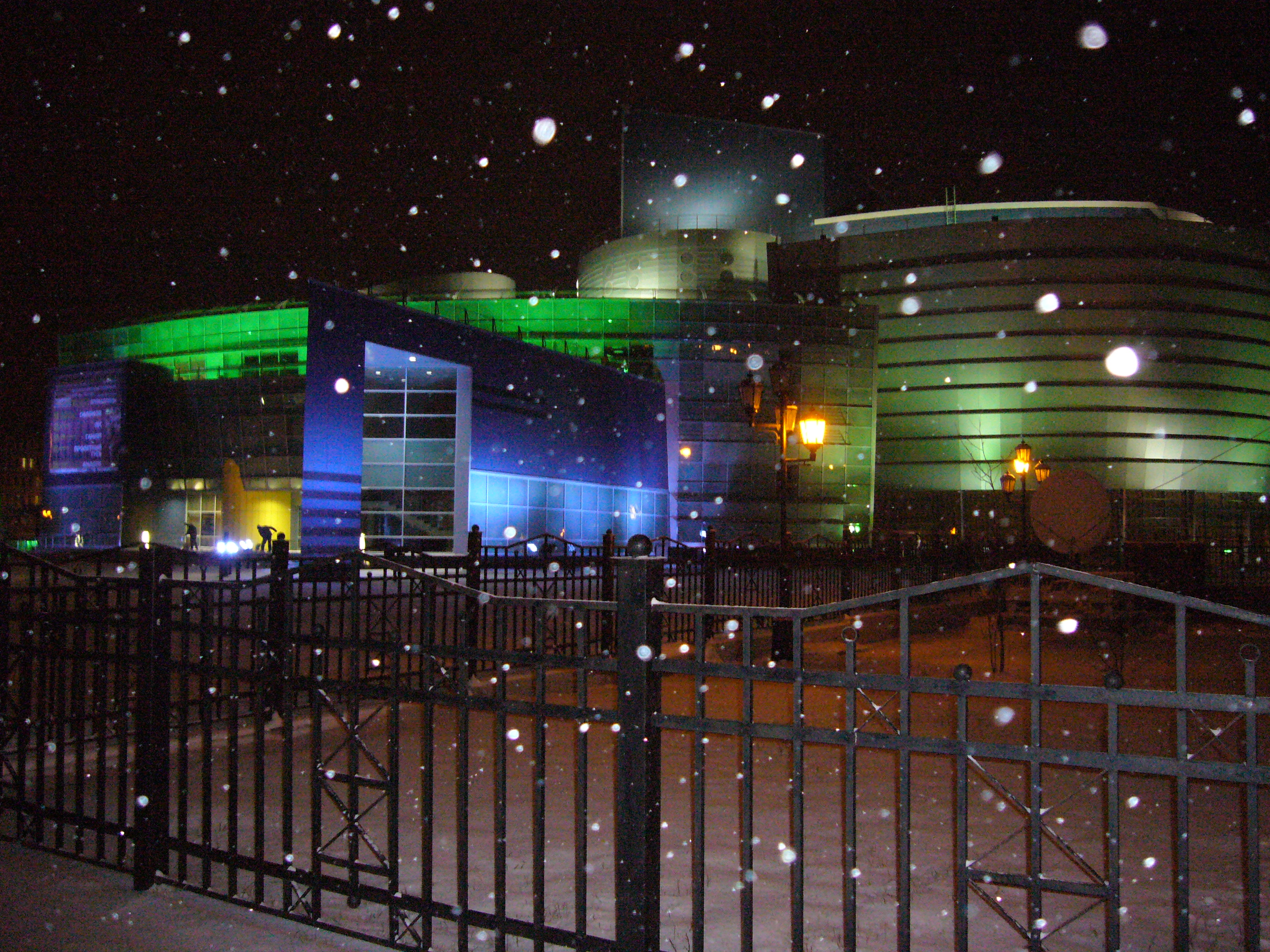
A theater in Khanty-Mansiysk

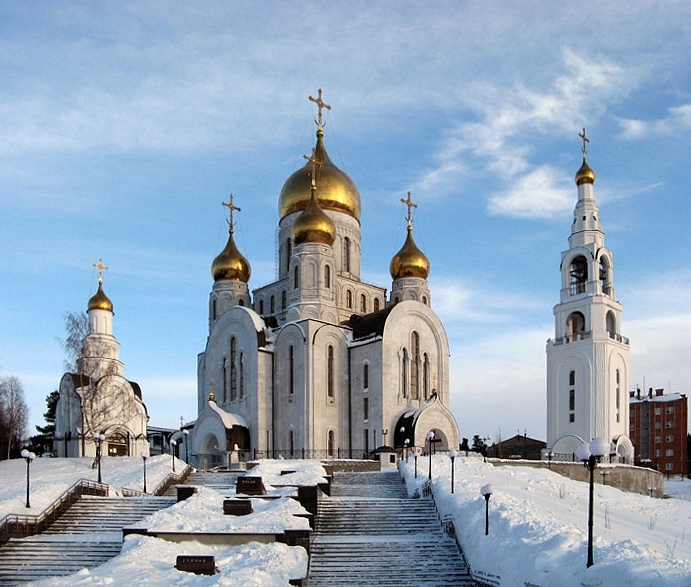
Church of the Resurrection

== Partnership cities ==
- Yerevan, Armenia (since 2014)
