= Nizhnyaya Tura railway station =

Railway station

Nizhnyaya Tura Нижняя Тура

General information
- Location: Nizhnyaya Tura, Sverdlovsk Oblast, Russia
- Coordinates: 58°37′57″N 59°49′42″E
- Platforms: 2
- Tracks: 3

Construction
- Parking: yes

Other information
- Station code: 773601

History
- Opened: 1906
- Electrified: 1935
Location

Nizhnyaya Tura railway station (Russian: станция Нижняя Тура) is a railway station located in Nizhnyaya Tura, Sverdlovsk Oblast, Russia. It is part of the Sverdlovsk Railway, on the main line that connects Cheryomukhovo railway station and Goroblagodatskaya railway station.

The passenger-and-freight station is one of three to serve the town, along with Mir and GRES. It forms the terminus of the Nizhneturinsk branch line, which separates from the main line at Vyya railway station.

The station is in the western part of Nizhnyaya Tura. It has a stone two-storey building with a large waiting room built in the constructivist style in the middle of the 20th century. There are several outbuildings, including an early-20th century water tower. Roads link the station to industrial enterprises in the city. The station was opened in 1906, to link the Nizhneturinsky Nikolaev Arms Works to the line at Vyya.

The station serves commuter and freight traffic, with Elektrichka trains between Nizhny Tagil railway station and Verkhoturye railway station, and those between Nizhny Tagil and Serov railway station, stopping here.
