= Priobye railway station =

Railway station in Russia

Priobye Приобье
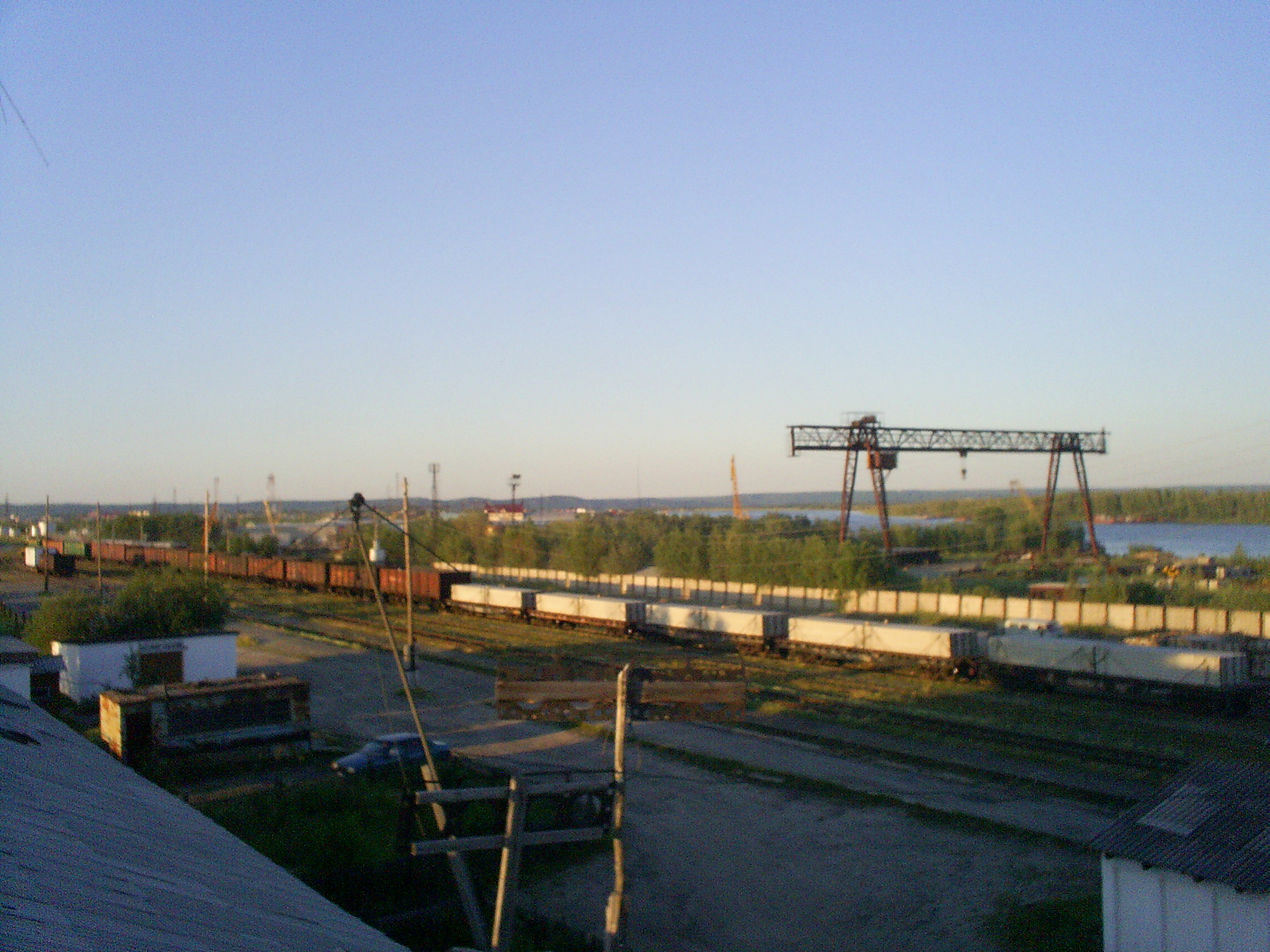

General information
- Coordinates: 62°31′53″N 65°36′24″E
- Operator: Sverdlovsk Railway (Rail transport)
- Line: Ivdel-Priobye line
- Platforms: 1 side platform (straight)

Other information
- Station code: 779409 (Express-3 code:2030295)
Location

Priobye railway station (Russian: Приобье) is a railway station on the Ivdel-Priobye line in Priobye, Oktyabrsky District, Khanty-Mansi Autonomous Okrug, Russia. It is the terminal passenger station of the Severny Ural line (Russian: Северный Урал, lit. 'North Ural') between Moscow and Priobye, a journey that takes about two days.

== Trains ==
Train number	Route	Train number	Route
084E; Severny Ural	Priobye — Moscow	084M; Severny Ural	Moscow — Priobye
338E	Priobye — Yekaterinburg	337E	Yekaterinburg — Priobye
344E	Priobye — Yekaterinburg	343E	Yekaterinburg — Priobye
6976/6974/6970	Priobye — Serov	6969/6973/6975	Serov — Priobye
