= Museum of Sverdlovsk Railway =

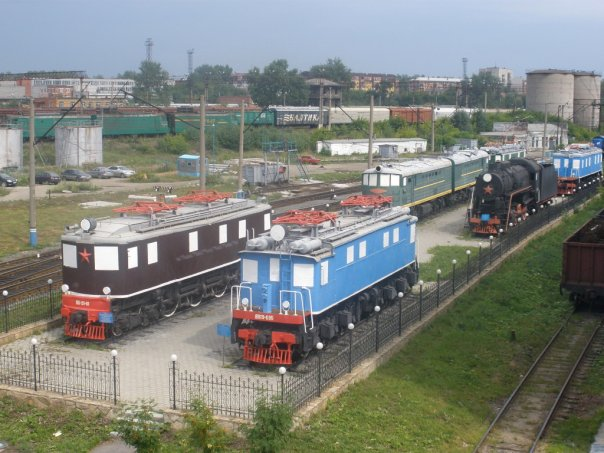
- Showground

- Location within Russia
- Established: 2003
- Location: Yekaterinburg, Russia
- Coordinates: 56.858778°N 60.600611°E
- Type: Railway museum
- Public transit access: Yekaterinburg-Sortirovochny, Yekaterinburg-Passazhirsky

The Museum of Sverdlovsk Railway (Russian: Музей Свердловской железной дороги, Muzyey Sverdlovskoy zheleznoy dorogi) is a railway museum in Yekaterinburg, Sverdlovsk Oblast, Russia, which opened in the 1970s. It consists of the Old Yekaterinburg Station building at the city center (Uralskaya metro station) and a display area 6,000 m^{2} at the Yekaterinburg-Sortirovochny station on the north-west outskirts of Yekaternburg.

The first museum of history of Sverdlovsk Railway was opened in the 1970s. The exposition worked only for railwaymen. Entry for outsiders was carried out by appointment. The museum was opened for general consumption in the Old Station building in 2003, which was built in 1878. The architect was Pyotr Shreyber. Restoration of the building was dated for celebrating 125th anniversary of Svrdlovsk railway. The entrance is decorated with the bronze sculptures of travellers and railwaymen. Near the entrance are also trucks of a freight carriage, semaphore and lifting gate.

Permanent exposition includes: information boards about famous Sverdlovsk railwaymen, model railroad, workplace tools, historical photographs, signaling arrangements, model trains (include the first Russian Cherepanov's steam locomotive), overhead structures, uniform, model railroad at the Revda and Verkh-Neyvinsky stations. The exhibition covers the period from emergence of rail transport in the region up to the present moment. The exposition presents VL11 driver's desk, workplace of the station attendant in the early 1950s and the ticket teller.

Historical rolling stock (13 locomotives and carriages) is exhibited at the display area at Yekaterinburg-Sortirovochny station. The total length of the exhibition tracks is 300 m.

== Exhibits ==
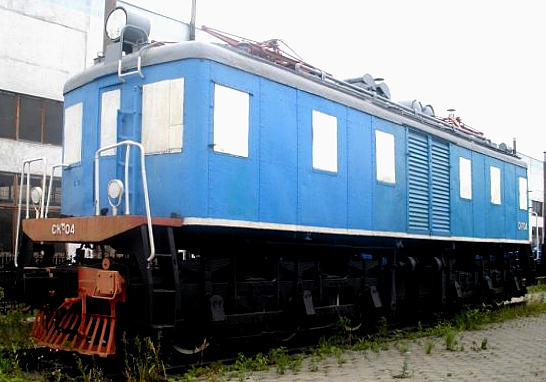
VL20 electric locomotive

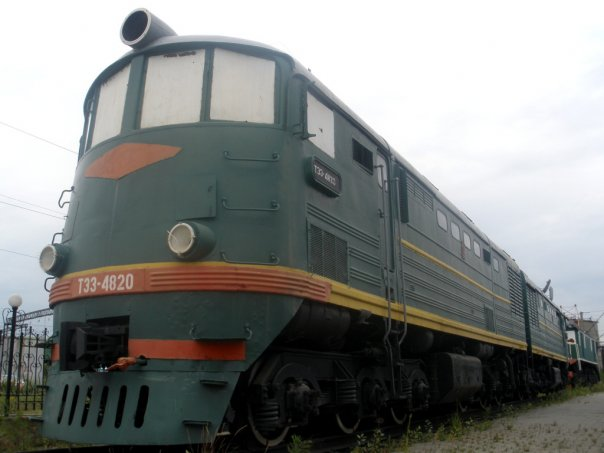
TE3 diesel locomotive

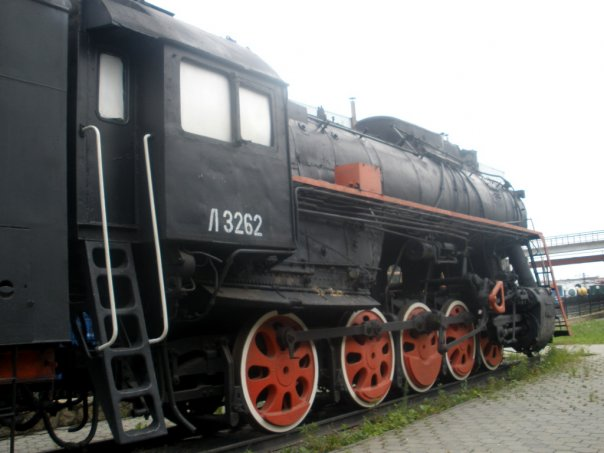
Class L steam locomotive

The exhibition presents freight carriages, motor locomotives and trucks. The following full-size locomotives are on display.

=== Locomotives ===
- Class FD steam locomotive
- Class L steam locomotive
- Class TE3 diesel locomotive
- Class S_{S} electric locomotive
- Class VK20 electric locomotive
- Class PB21 electric locomotive (was built in a unique copy)
- Class VL19 electric locomotive
