= Old Station building (Yekaterinburg) =

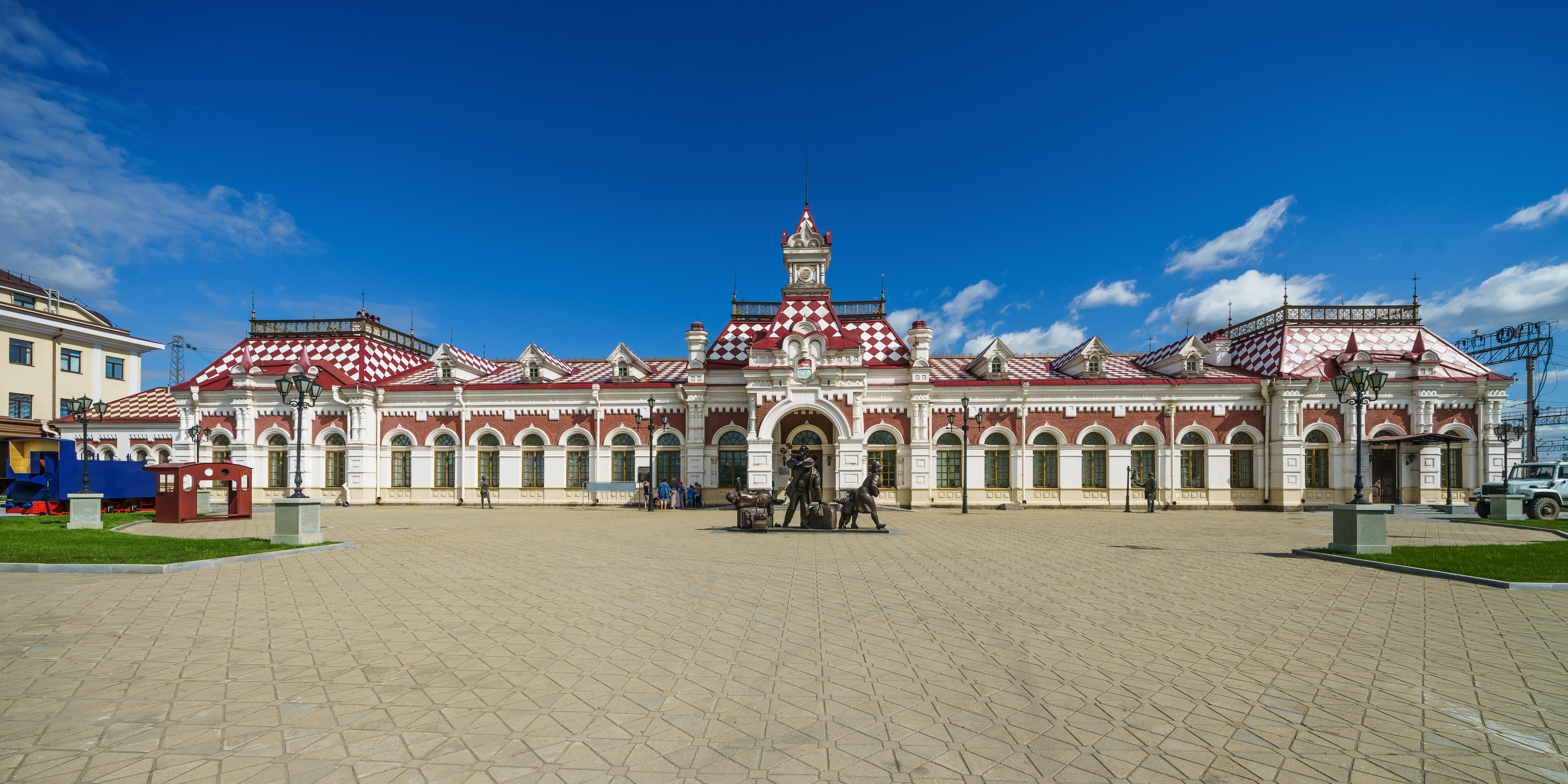
- Interactive map of the Old Station building (Yekaterinburg) area
- Former names: Yekaterinburg railway station
- Alternative names: The museum of History & Engineering science of the Sverdlovsk Railway

General information
- Status: Used as a museum
- Type: Train station
- Architectural style: Russian Revival
- Location: 14 Vokzalnaya Street, Yekaterinburg, Russia
- Coordinates: 56°51′31.6″N 60°36′02.2″E
- Construction started: 1878
- Completed: 1914

Design and construction
- Architect: Pyotr Shreyber

The old station building (Russian: Старый вокзал, romanized: Stary vokzal) is an edifice in the Zheleznodorozhny District of Yekaterinburg, Russia. The house is located at 14 Vokzalnaya Street (Russian: Вокзальная улица, 14) It was a main station building between 1878 and 1914. The building was designed in the Russian Revival style. It is recognized as a historical landmark, has official status as an object of Russian cultural heritage, and contains the museum of History & Engineering science of the Sverdlovsk Railway.

== History ==
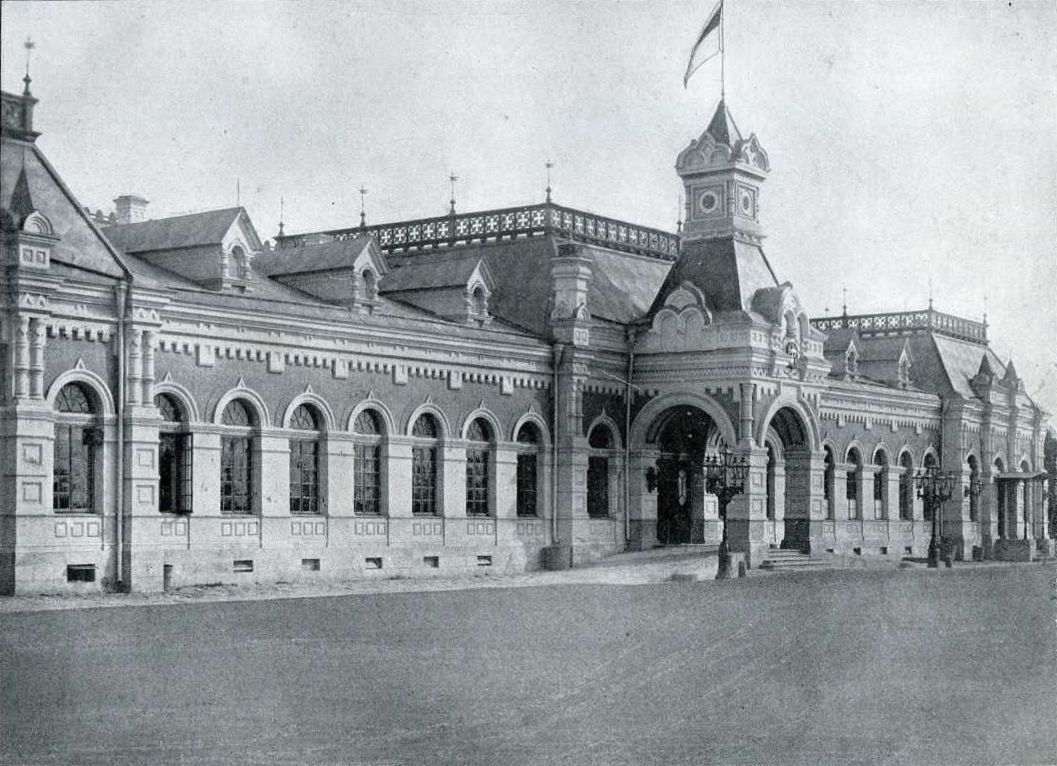
Yekaterinburg station in the 1910s

Yekaterinburg railway station was built in 1878 with the construction of the Ural mining railway from Perm to Yekaterinburg with the length of 372 km. It was designed by architect Pyotr Shreyber. Construction began in 1874. A twin train station, currently known as the Perm I railway station, was built to Shreyber's design at the other end of the railway. Opening of the railway triggered the economic growth, improving the quality of life.

After extension railways to Tyumen in 1886 and Chelyabinsk in 1896 station becomes a railway junction. The small station building could not cope with the increased passenger traffic by the beginning of the 20th century. For this reason Ministry of Transportation decided to build a new building a hundred meters away in 1910, which services the passengers of the Yekaterinburg railway station today. For a very long time the old building served as a railway station for the military. And in 2003, the railway was reconstructed and now serves as a museum open to the public.

The Museum of History & Engineering Science of the Sverdlovsk Railway was opened in the old station building in 2003. Rolling stock is exposed at the Yekaterinburg-Sortirivichny station, but the historical part is located here. In the front section of the building are sculptures of what appears to be hurrying passengers, and a station master changing a bell, and some stack man. They were designed by Yuri Krylov and Alexander Kokoteyev.

The first thing seen inside the old rail station, is the first steam machine designed by Yefim and Miron Cherepanov in Nizhny Tagil. Old historic artifacts that relate to the history of the Ural and Perm railroads can be located inside as well.

== Gallery ==
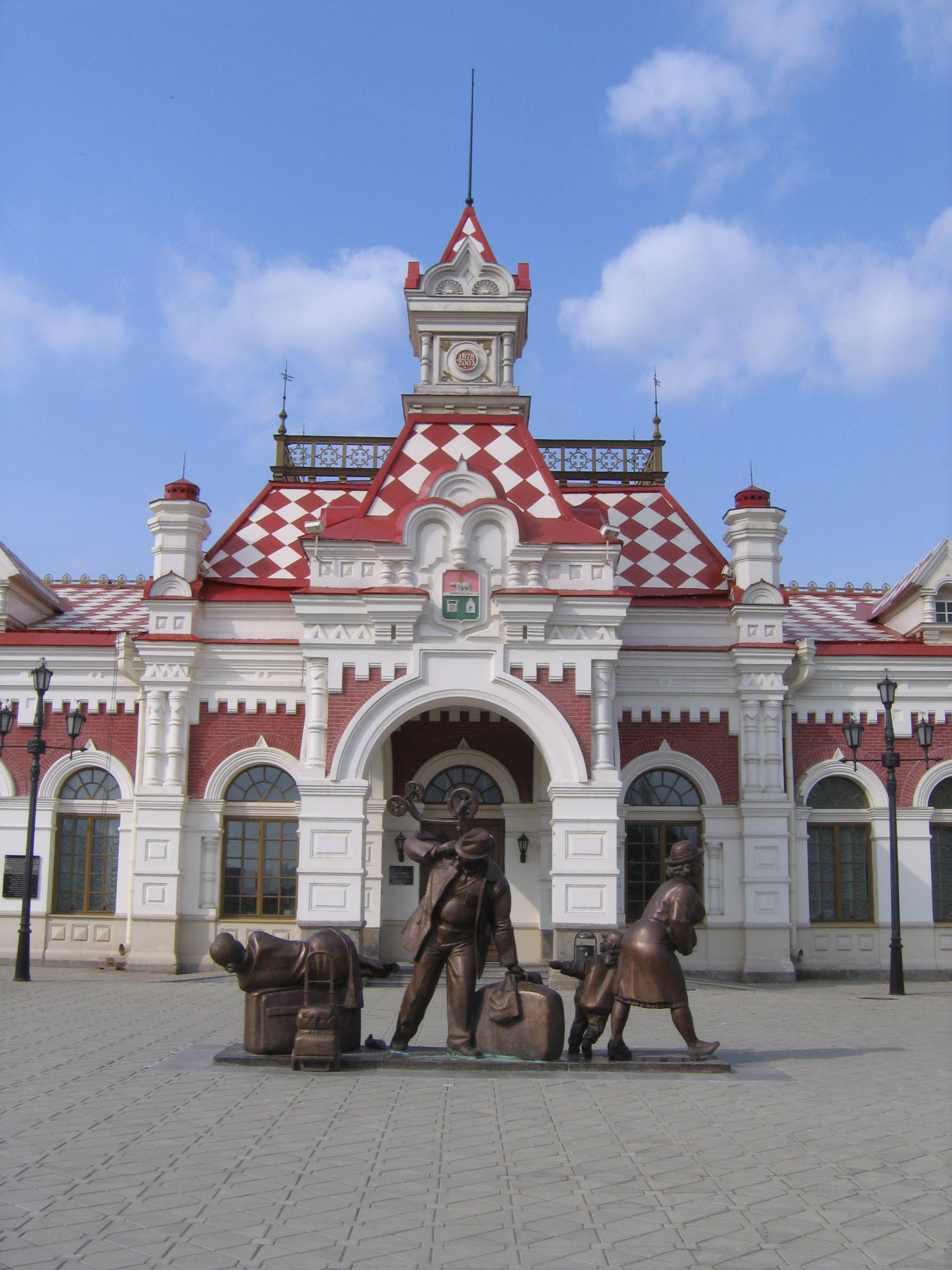
August 2008

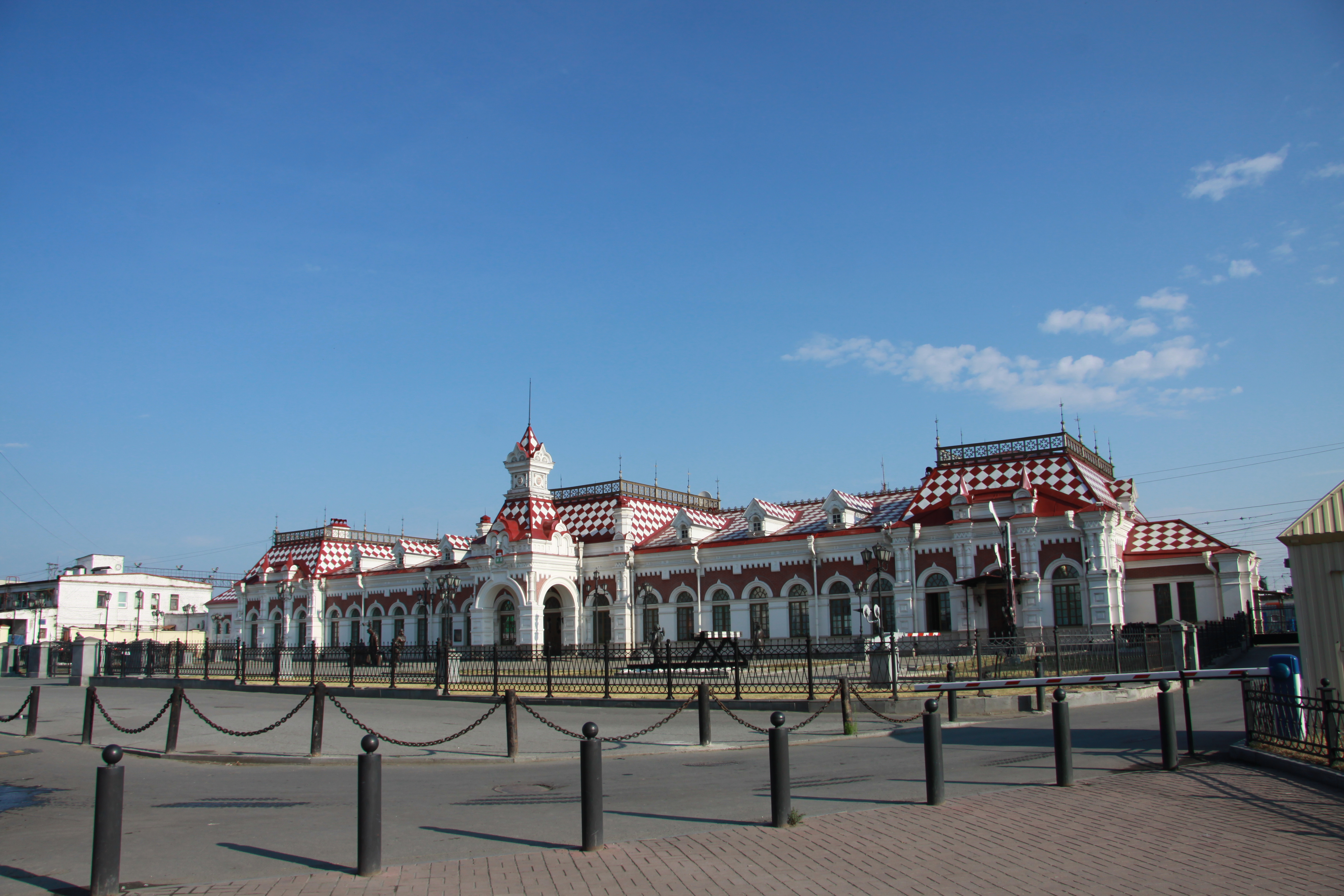
Juky 2013

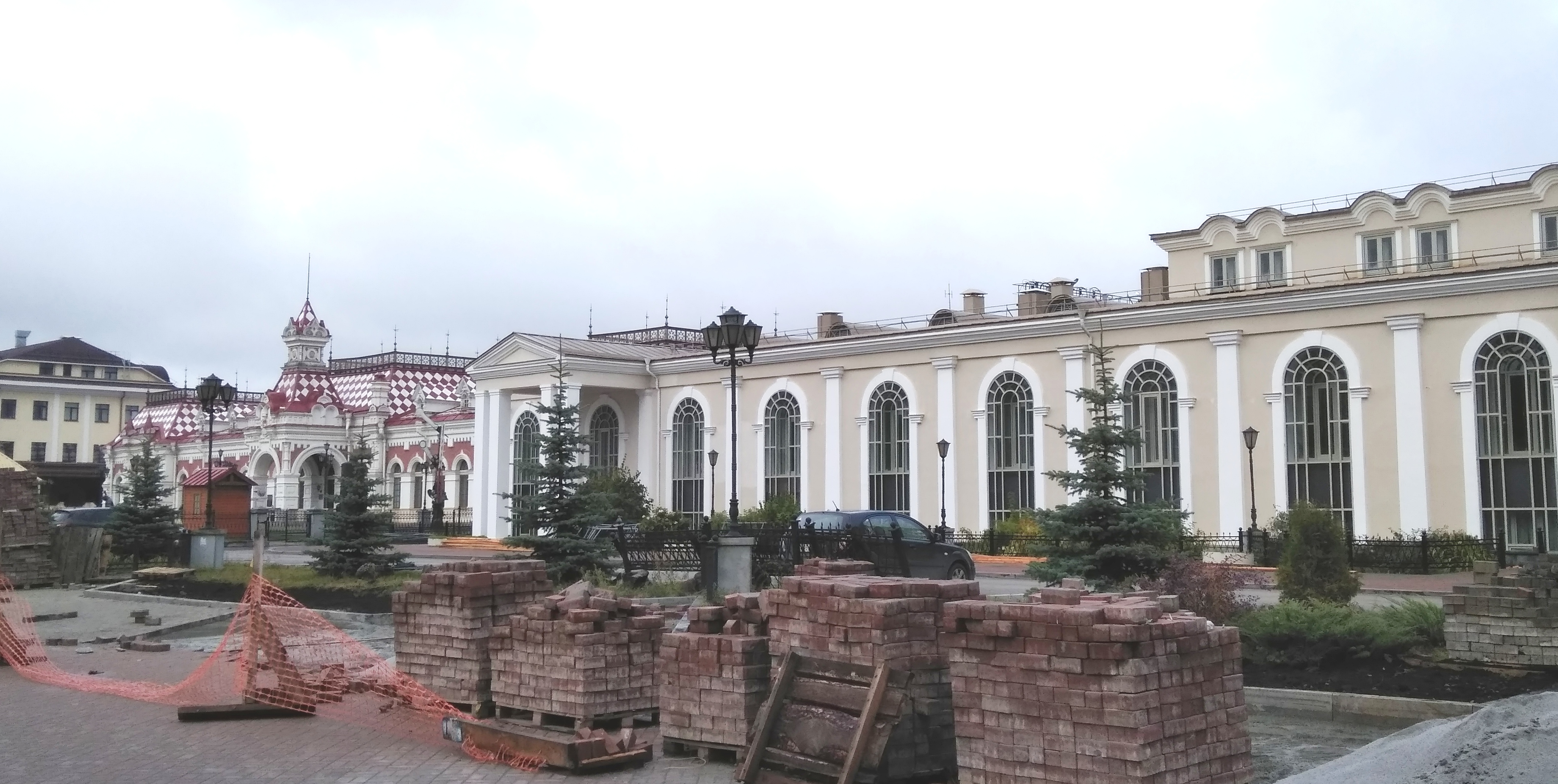
September 2017

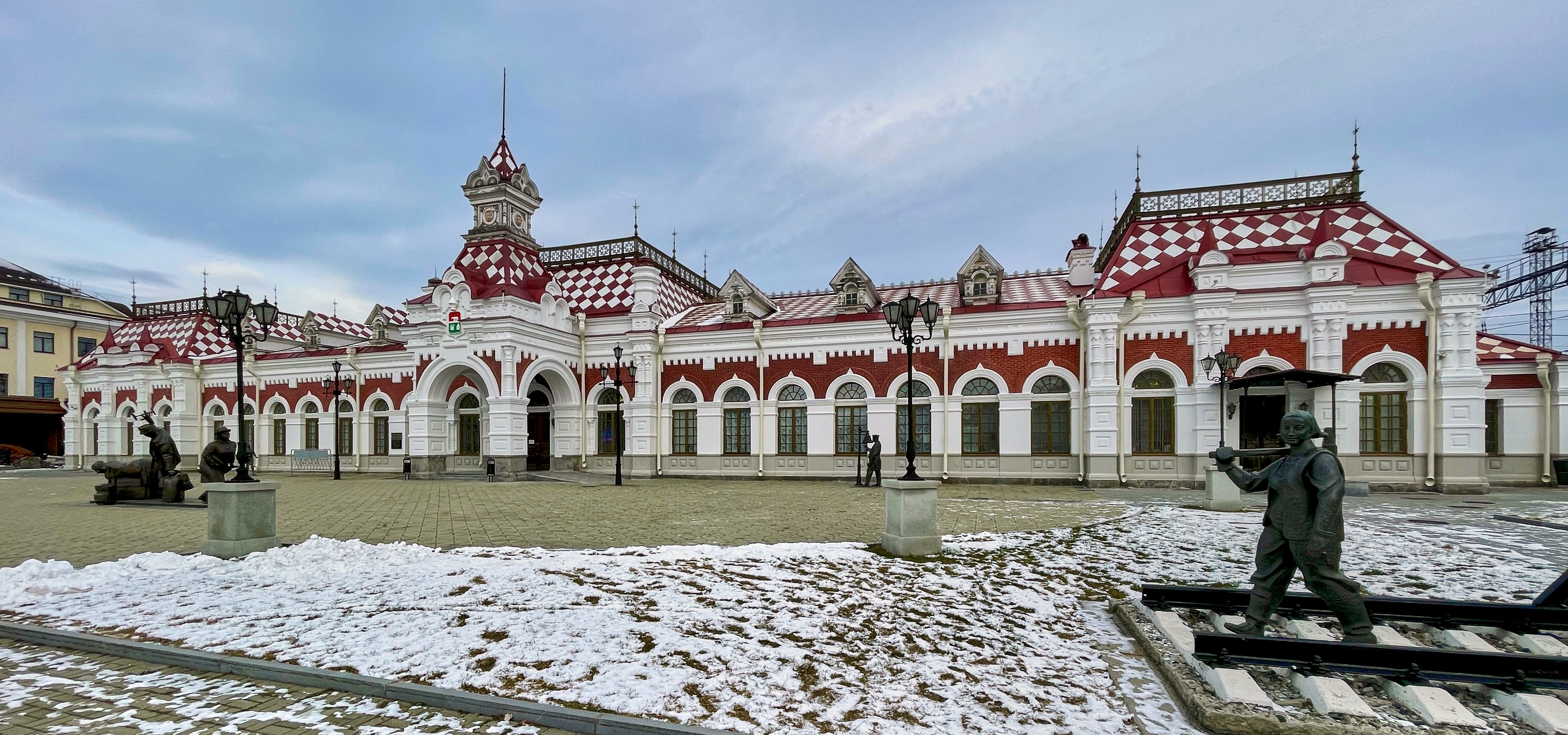
November 2021

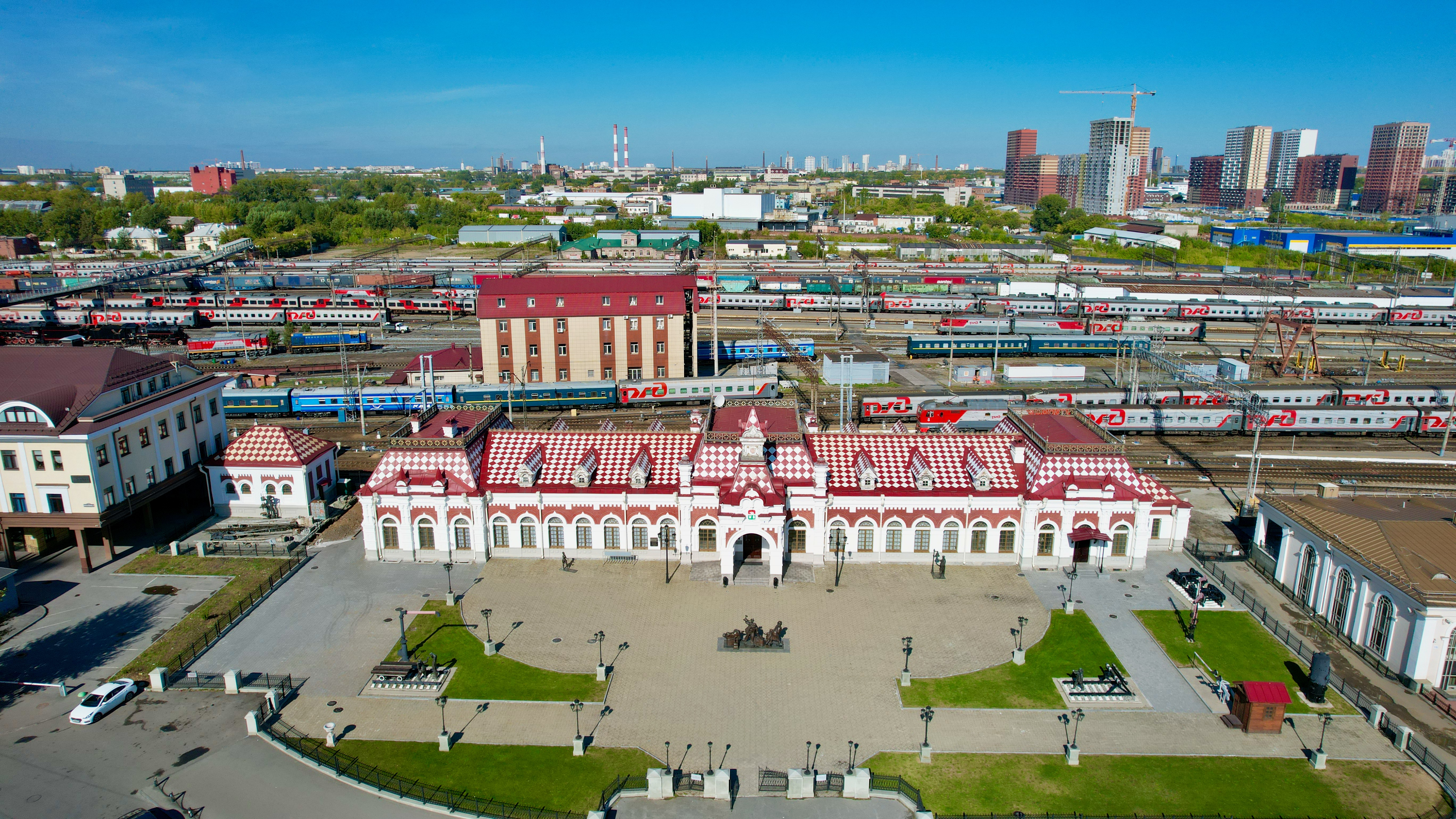
September 2022

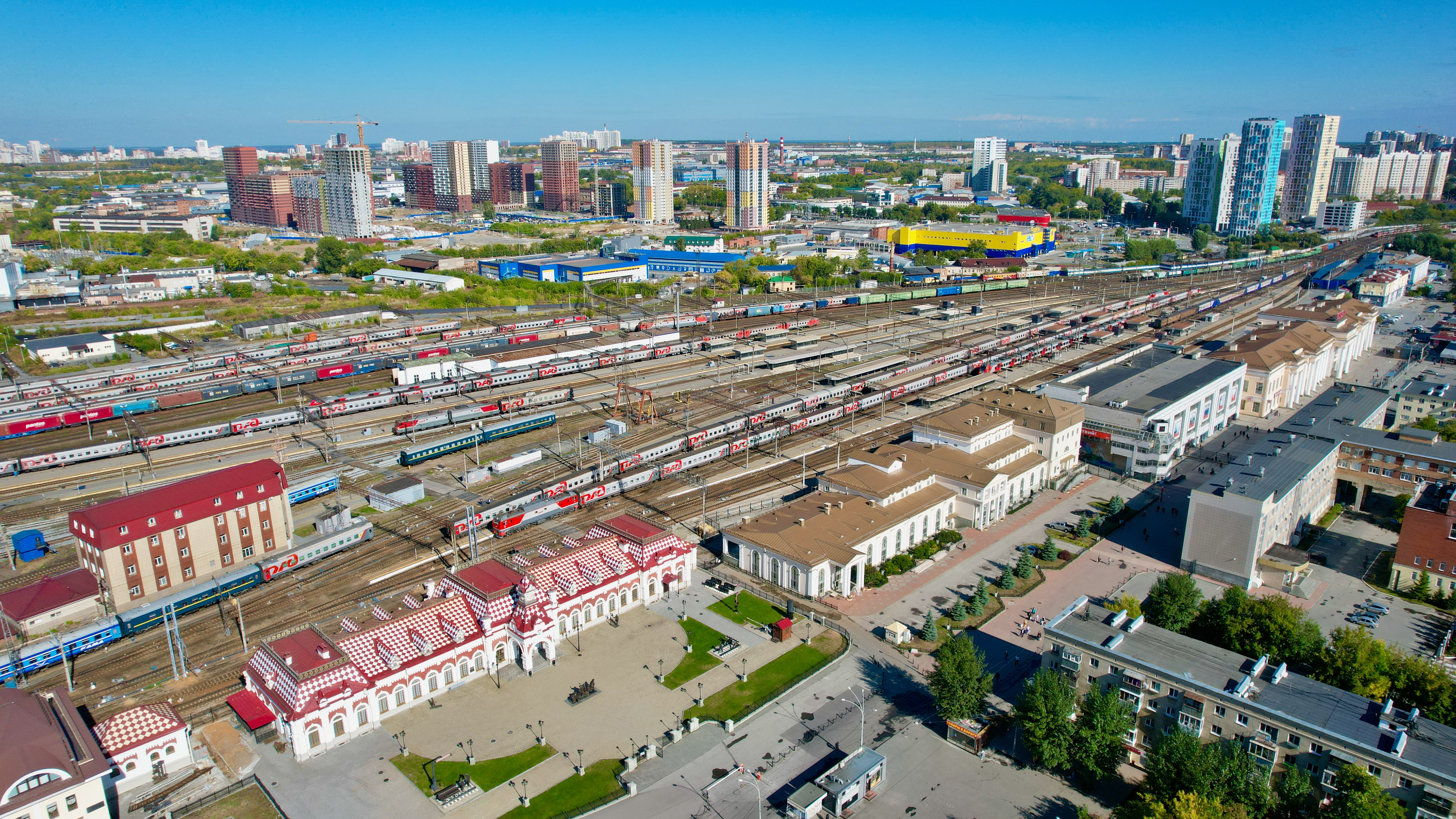
September 2022
