= Serov railway station =

Railway station in Russia

Serov Серов
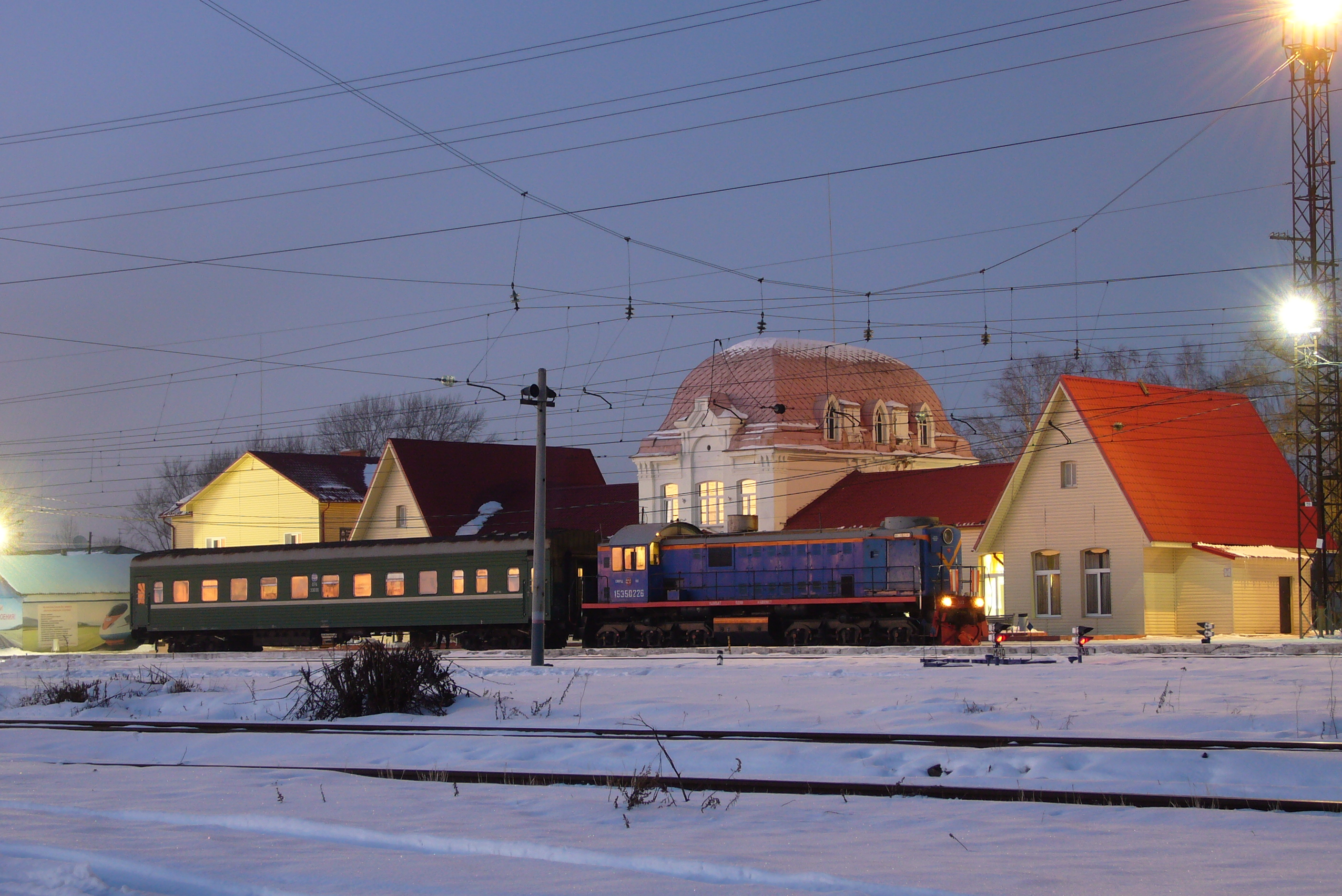

General information
- Coordinates: 59°35′40″N 60°33′42″E
- Operator: Sverdlovsk Railway(Rail transport)
- Platforms: 1 side platform (straight)

Other information
- Station code: 774405 (Express-3 code:2030140)

History
- Opened: 1906
Location

Serov railway station (Russian: Серов) is a railway station in Serov, Sverdlovsk Oblast, Russia. Severny Ural connecting Moscow and Priobye stops at this station.

== trains ==
train number	route	train number	route
084E; Severny Ural	Priobye — Moscow	084M; Severny Ural	Moscow — Priobye
338E	Priobye — Yekaterinburg	337E	Yekaterinburg — Priobye
344E	Priobye — Yekaterinburg	343E	Yekaterinburg — Priobye
7422/7421/6864	Serov — Nizhny_Tagil	6865/7430/7429	Nizhny_Tagil — Serov
7428	Serov — Goroblagodatskaya	6861	Goroblagodatskaya — Serov
7422/7421	Serov — Verkhoturye	6861	Verkhoturye — Serov
6969/6973/6975	Serov — Priobye	6976/6974/6970	Priobye — Serov
6983/6984	Serov — Karpunin	6981/6982	Karpunin — Serov
6987/6988	Serov — Sosva (village)	6985/6986	Sosva (village) — Serov
