= Nizhnyaya Tura =

Town in Sverdlovsk Oblast, Russia

Nizhnyaya Tura Нижняя Тура
- Town
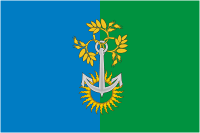
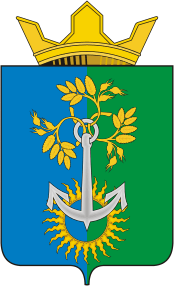
- Flag Coat of arms
- Interactive map of Nizhnyaya Tura
- Location of Nizhnyaya Tura Nizhnyaya Tura (Sverdlovsk Oblast)
- Coordinates: 58°37′15″N 59°50′52″E
- Country: Russia
- Federal subject: Sverdlovsk Oblast
- Founded: 1754
- Town status since: 1949
- Elevation: 205 m (673 ft)

Population (2010 Census)
  - Total: 22,006
  - Estimate (2025): 17,510 (−20.4%)

Administrative status
  - Subordinated to: Town of Nizhnyaya Tura
  - Capital of: Town of Nizhnyaya Tura

Municipal status
  - Urban okrug: Nizhneturinsky Urban Okrug
  - Capital of: Nizhneturinsky Urban Okrug
- Time zone: UTC+5 (MSK+2)
- Postal code: 624220–624223
- OKTMO ID: 65715000001

Nizhnyaya Tura (Russian: Ни́жняя Тура) is a town in Sverdlovsk Oblast, Russia, located on the Tura River (Ob's basin), 254 kilometers (158 mi) north of Yekaterinburg. Population: 22,006 (2010 census); 24,247 (2002 census); 26,268 (1989 Soviet census).

== History ==
It was founded in 1754; town status was granted to it in 1949. Nizhnyaya Tura railway station was opened in 1906.

== Administrative and municipal status ==
Within the framework of the administrative divisions, it is, together with twenty-one rural localities, incorporated as the Town of Nizhnyaya Tura—an administrative unit with the status equal to that of the districts. As a municipal division, the Town of Nizhnyaya Tura is incorporated as Nizhneturinsky Urban Okrug.
