= Yekaterinburg railway station =

Railway station in Russia

Yekaterinburg–Passazirskiy Екатеринбург–Пассажирский
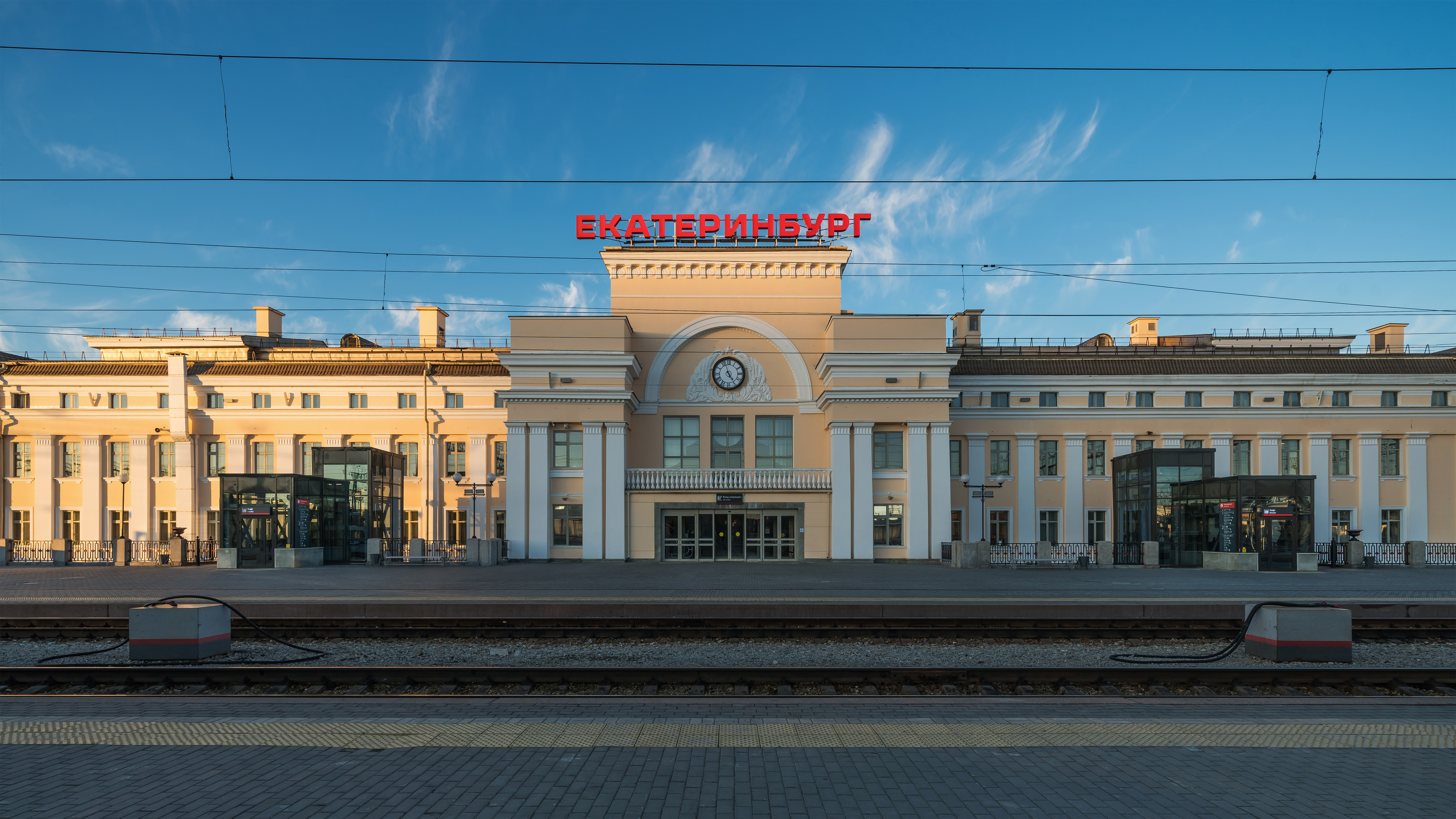
- View of the station from a platform

General information
- Location: Yekaterinburg, Russia
- Coordinates: 56°51′32″N 60°36′15″E
- System: Sverdlovsk Railway terminal
- Owner: Russian Railways (Sverdlovsk Railway)
- Platforms: 7 (6 island platforms)
- Tracks: 15

Construction
- Parking: yes

Other information
- Station code: 250302
- Fare zone: 0

History
- Opened: 1878

Services
Preceding station	Sverdlovsk Railway	Following station
Location

Yekaterinburg–Passazhirsky (Russian: Екатеринбург–Пассажирский) is the central passenger railway station in Yekaterinburg, a major transportation hub, located on the Trans-Siberian main line and Sverdlovsk Railway. The station complex consisting of 4 buildings, provides 60 per diem departure passenger and commuter trains more than 180.

== Routes ==
Yekaterinburg station is a junction station on the Trans-Siberian main line. The current building was built in 1915. In the period from 1997 to 2001 the station was reconstructed and completely renewed.

Yekaterinburg station trains haul in seven directions, following in Abakan, Anapa, Adler, Almaty, Astana, Barnaul, Baku, Bishkek, Blagoveshchensk, Brest, Vladivostok, Volgograd, Izhevsk, Irkutsk, Kazan, Kemerovo, Kirov, Kislovodsk, Krasnoyarsk, Kurgan, Minsk, Moscow, Nizhnevartovsk, Nizhny Tagil, Novokuznetsk, Novosibirsk, Novorossiysk, Novy Urengoy, Orenburg, Beijing, Perm, Petropavlovsk, Samara, St. Petersburg, Severobaykalsk, Severouralsk, Solikamsk, Tashkent, Tyumen, Tomsk, Tynda, Ufa, Kharkiv, Vladivostok, Chita, Ulan Bator, Ulan-Ude, Mouth-Aha. Cars also ply direct messages to Berlin, Bijsk, Warsaw, Gomel, Grodno, Kyiv, Mogilev, Neryungri, Pavlodar, Pyongyang, Ruzaevka, Sovetskaya Gavan, Tommot, and Erdenet.

== Trains and destinations ==
=== International ===
Train number	Train name	Destination	Operated by
001М/002Щ	Rossiya; Россия	(Russia) Moscow (Yaroslavsky) (Russia) Vladivostok (cars: (North Korea) Pyongyang, (North Korea) Tumangang)	(Russia) Russian Railways
003З/004З		(Russia) Moscow (Yaroslavsky) (China) Beijing (Main); Runs through Mongolia	China Railway
005Щ/006Щ		(Russia) Moscow (Yaroslavsky) (Mongolia) Ulaanbaatar (cars: (Mongolia) Erdenet)	(Russia) Russian Railways (Mongolia) Ulaanbataar Railway
019Ч/020Щ	Vostok; Восток	(Russia) Moscow (Yaroslavsky) (China) Beijing (Main)	(Russia) Russian Railways
063Б/064Б		(Belarus) Minsk (cars: (Belarus) Brest) (Russia) Novosibirsk	(Belarus) Belarusian Railways
089У/090У	Zauralye; Зауралье	(Russia) Moscow (Kazansky) (Russia) Kurgan (cars: (Russia) Chelyabinsk, (Russia) Novokuznetsk, (Kazakhstan) Petropavl)	(Russia) Russian Railways
304Ц/305Щ		(Russia) Kazan (Main) (Kazakhstan) Almaty (Almaty-2) (cars: (Kyrgyzstan) Bishkek (Bishkek-2), (Uzbekistan) Tashkent)	Kazakhstan Temir Zholy (Kyrgyzstan) Kyrgyz Railways (Uzbekistan) Uzbek Railways

== Gallery ==
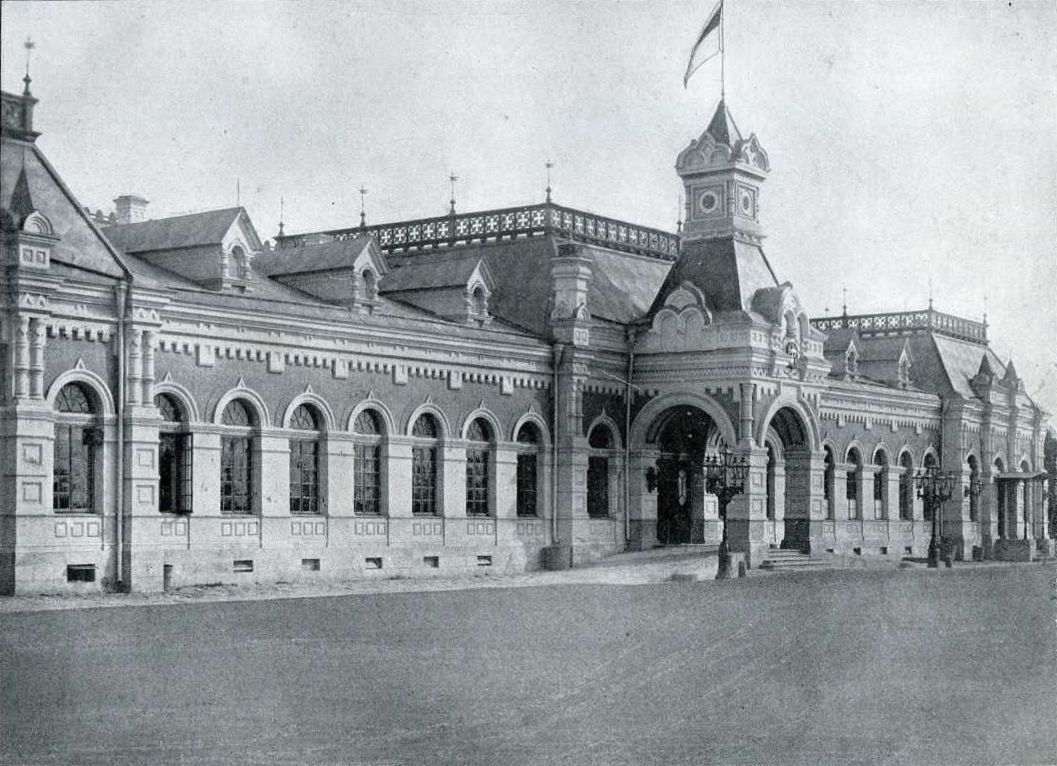
Ерe beginning of the 20th century

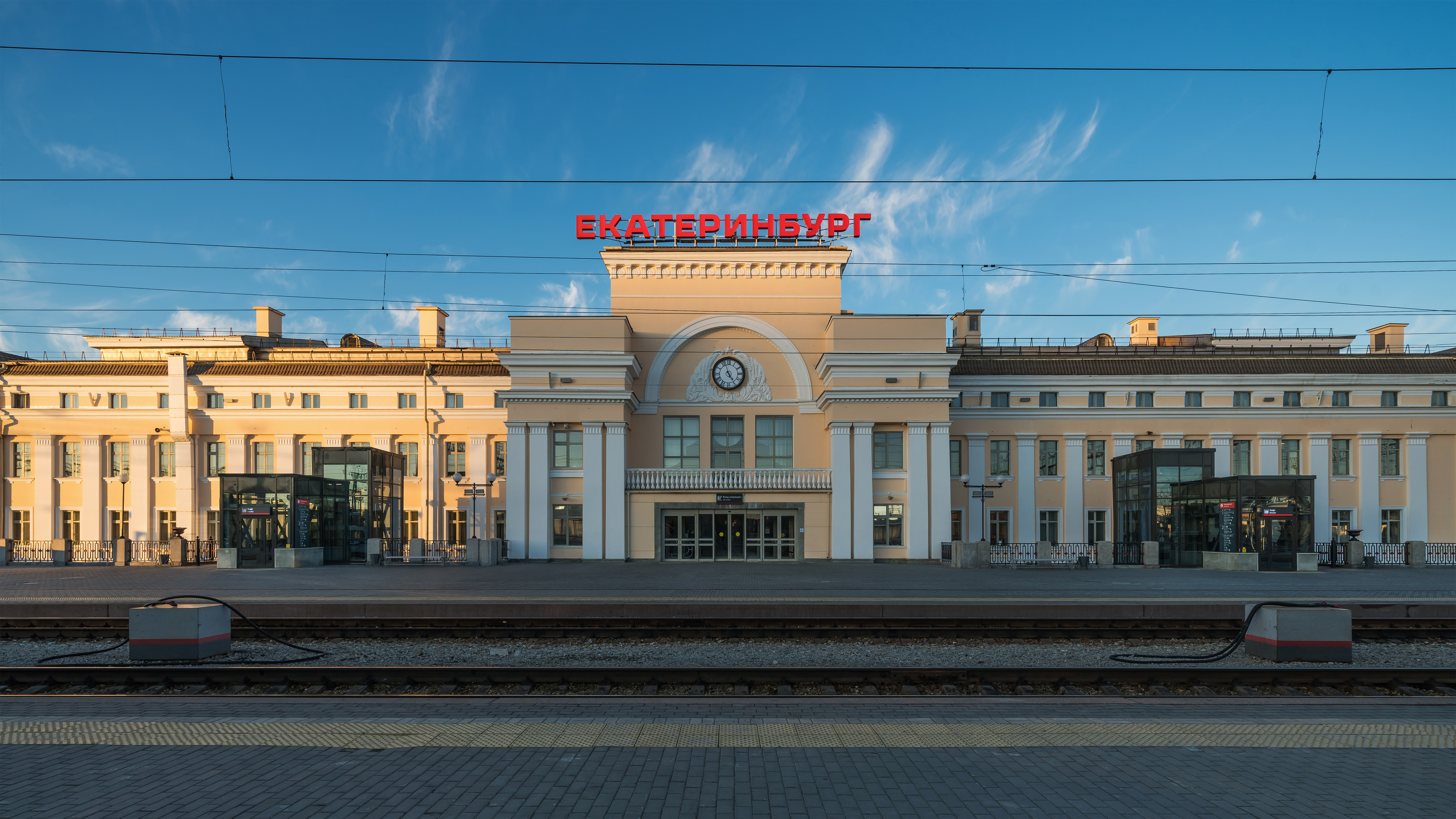
In 2019

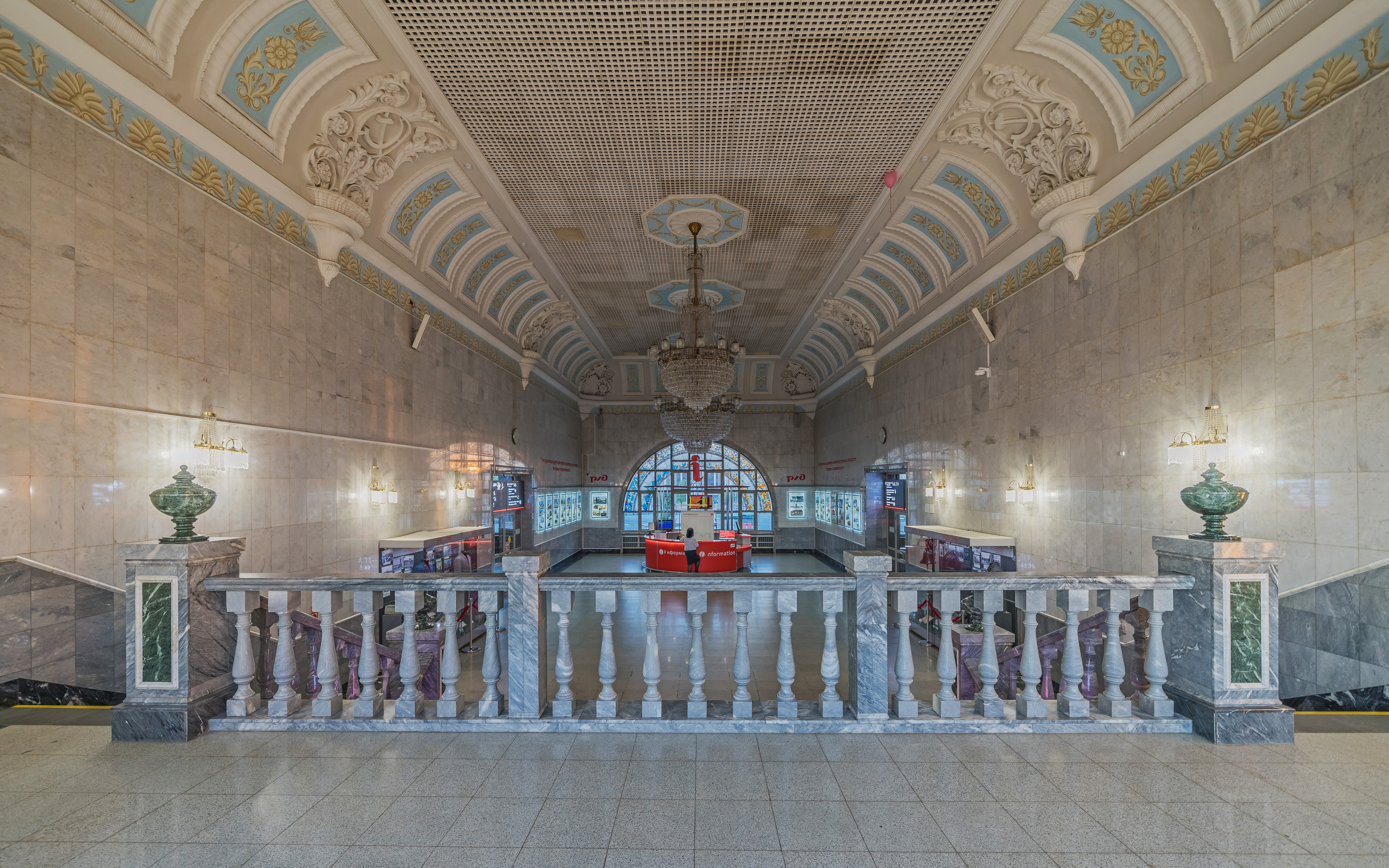
In 2019

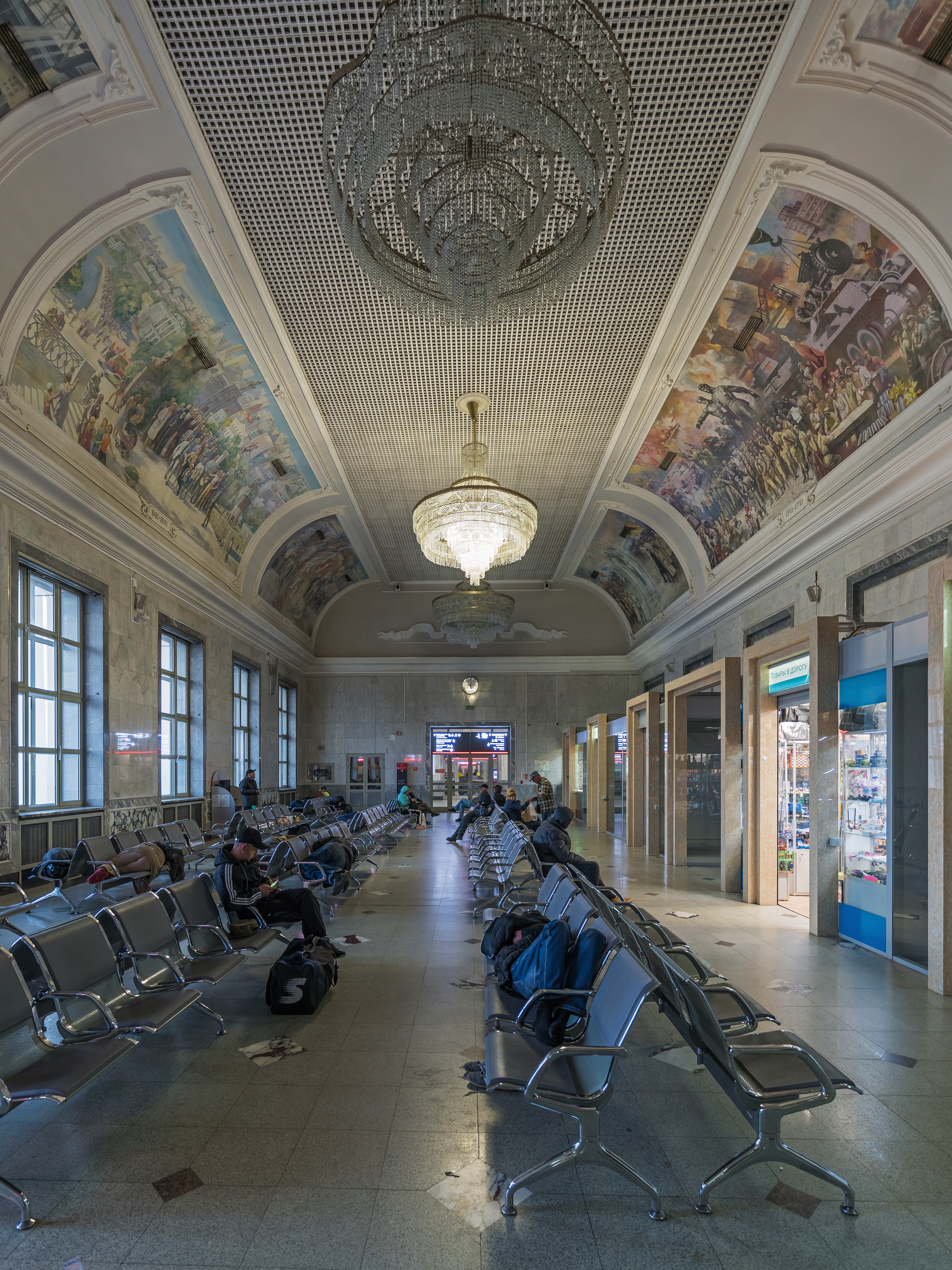
In 2019

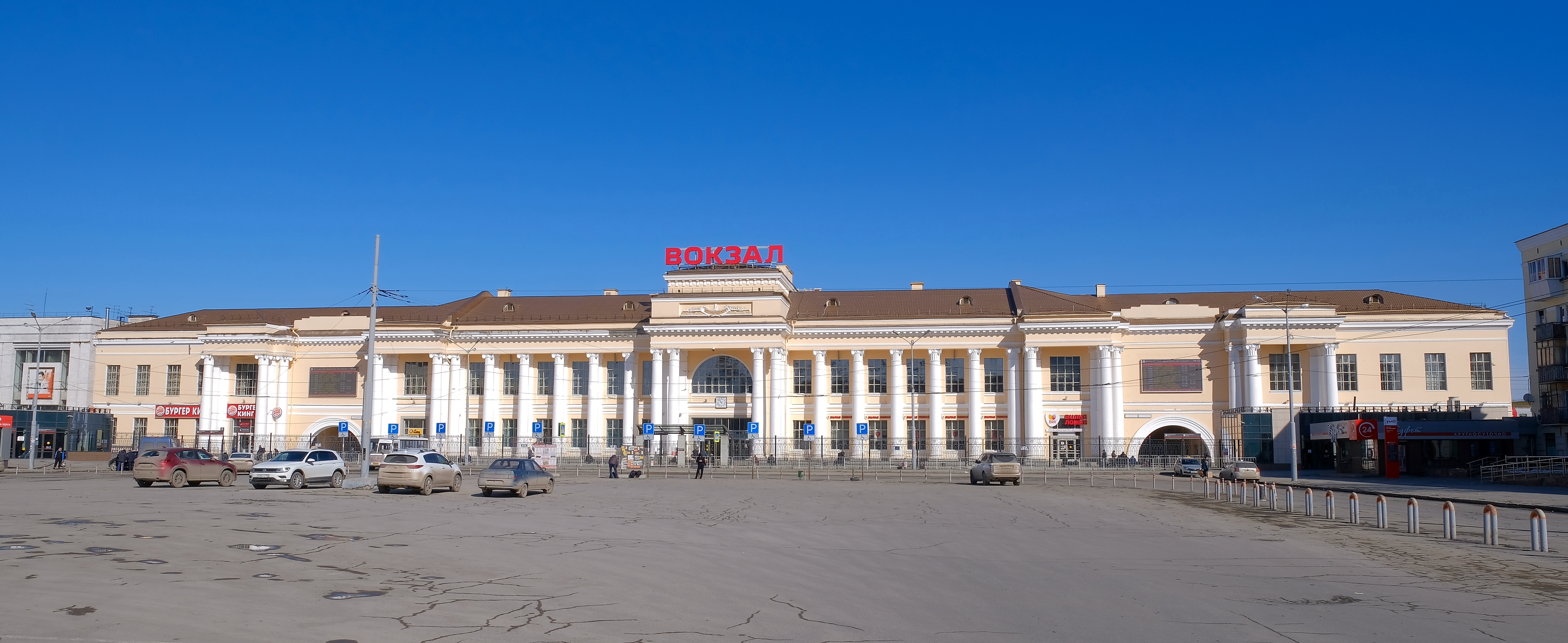
In 2021

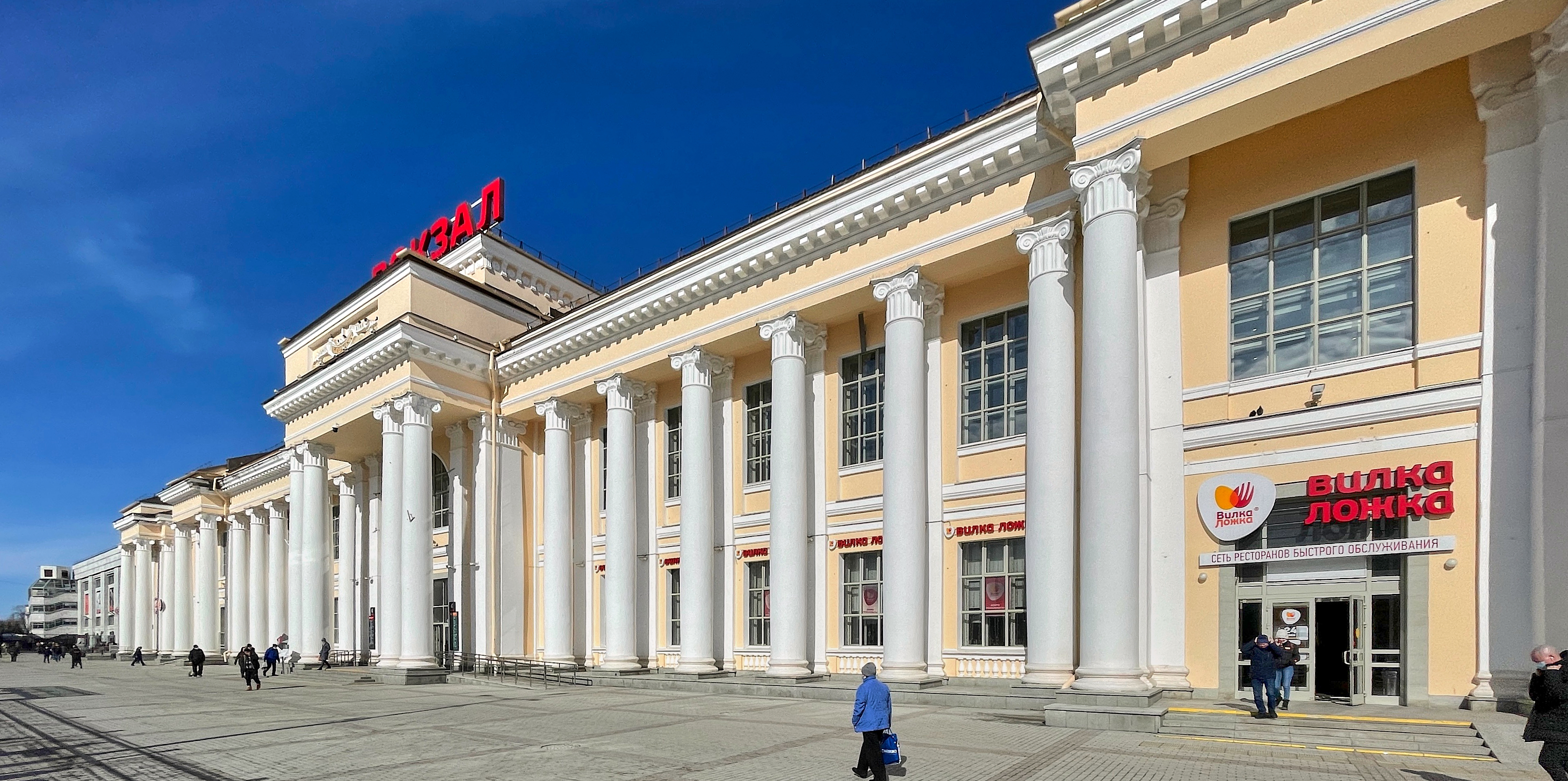
In 2021

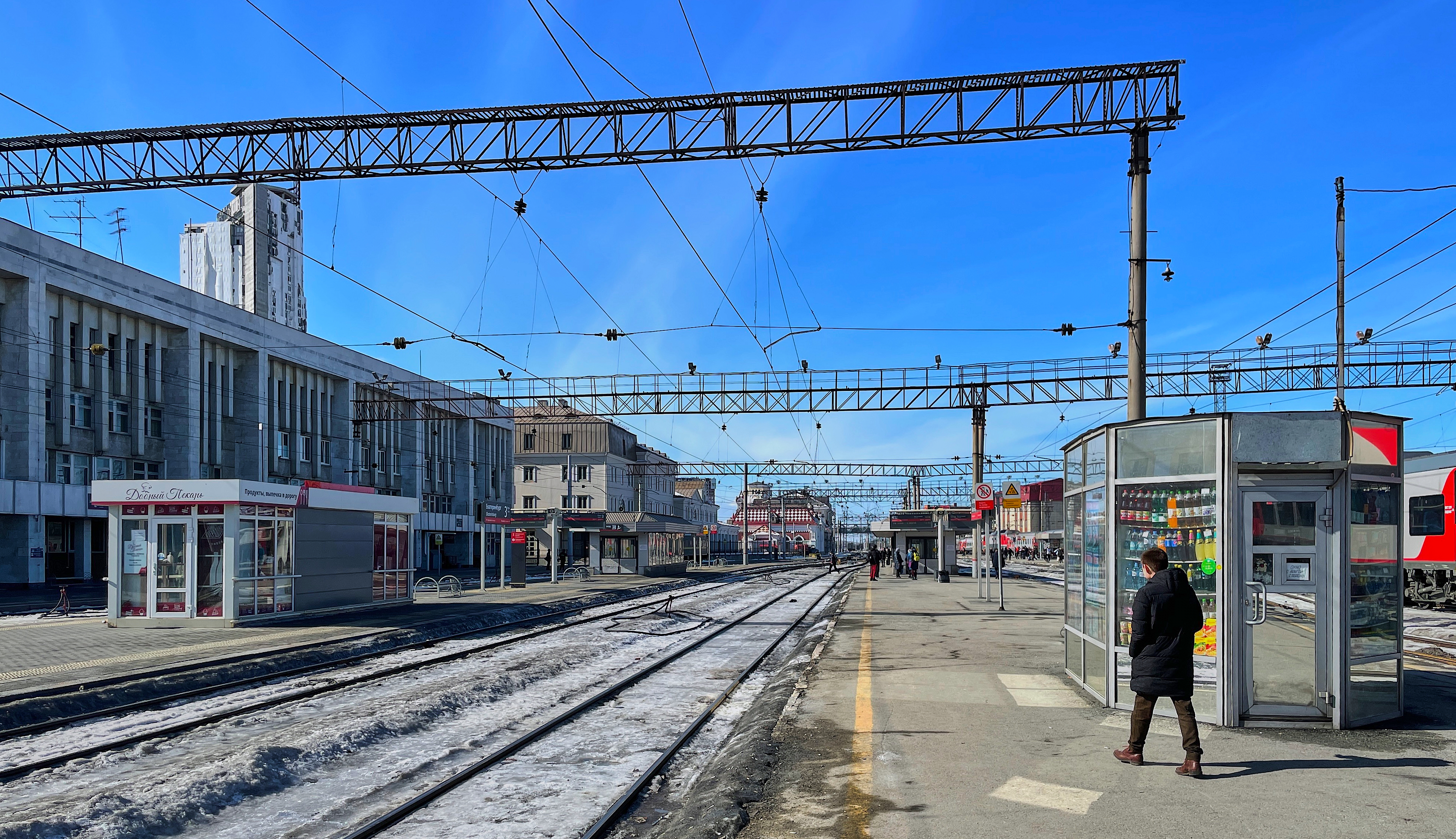
In 2021

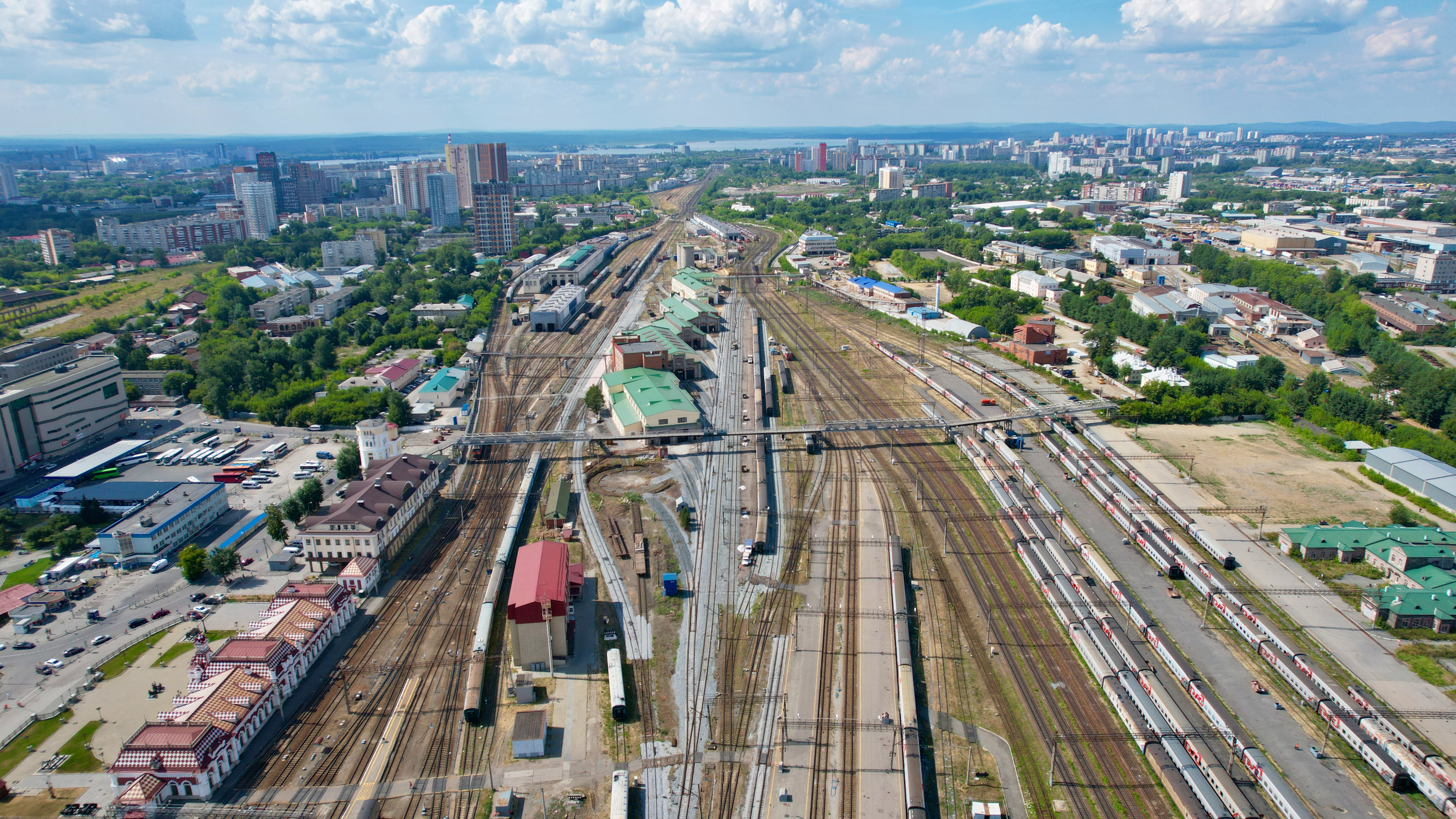
In 2022
