= Sverdlovsk Railway =

Railway in Russia

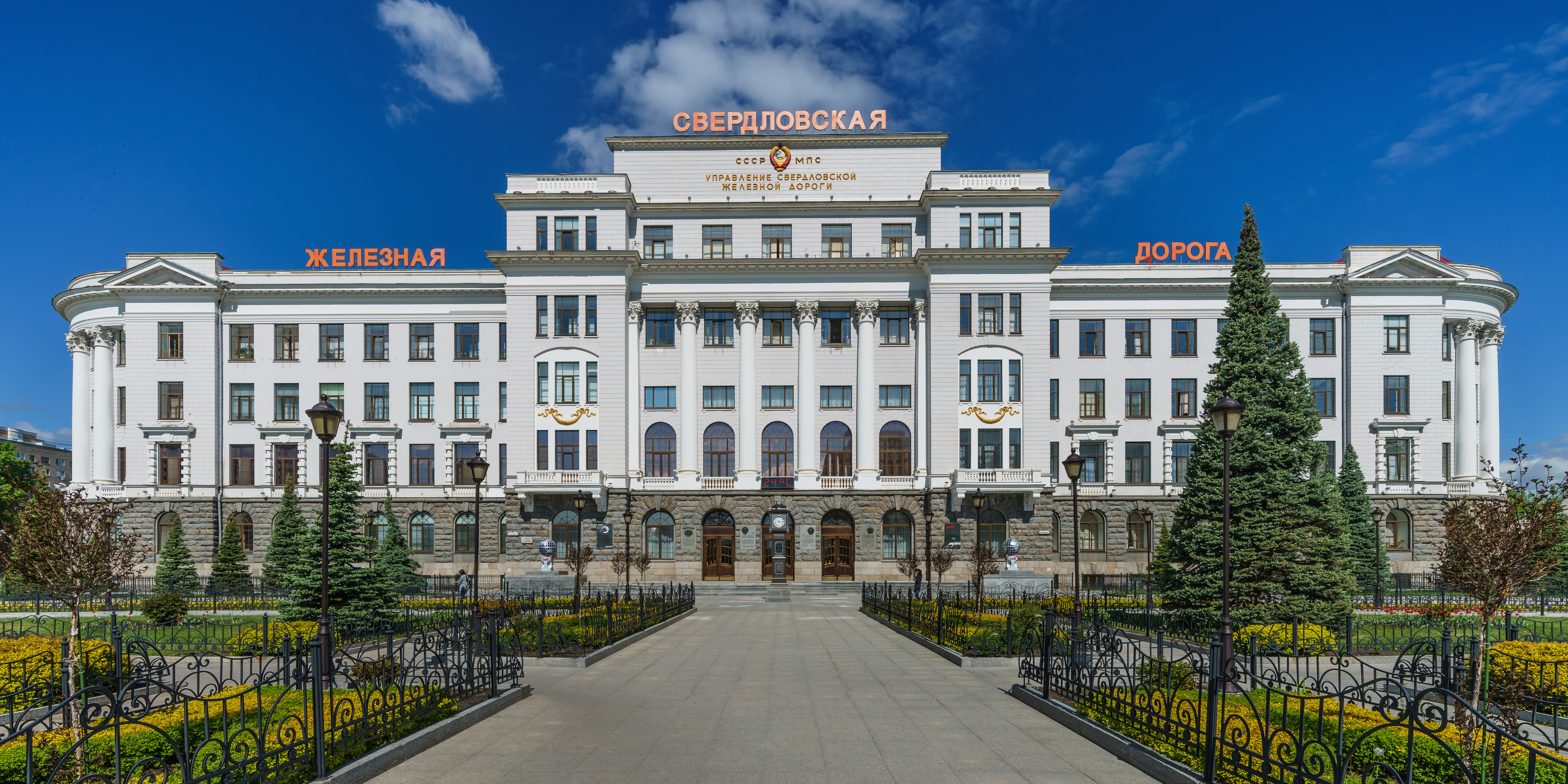
Main office in Yekaterinburg

The Sverdlovsk Railway (Свердловская железная дорога) is a subsidiary of the Russian Railways headquartered in Yekaterinburg (formerly known as Sverdlovsk, hence the name).

In 1991 the length of the railway route was 7,152.2 kilometres (4,444.2 miles). Its area of operation comprises Perm, Sverdlovsk, Tyumen, Yugra, and Yamalo-Nenets regions. It is a vital part of the Trans-Siberian Railway and one of the busiest railway networks in Russia. The Yekaterinburg classification yard is one of the largest in Europe.

The core of the network dates from the late 19th century. The Perm–Yekaterinburg line was opened in 1879, followed by the Yekaterinburg–Tyumen line six years later. After the completion of the Yekaterinburg–Chelyabinsk and Perm–Vyatka–Kotlas lines in 1900, the Ural Railway network was renamed the Perm Railway. Its headquarters were in Perm. The Tyumen–Omsk main line has been in operation since 1913.

The Yamal Railway Company, set up in 2003 from the remains of the Transpolar Mainline, is a joint enterprise of the Sverdlovsk Railway and Gazprom. It provides railway access to the gas fields in the north of Siberia.

== Leadership ==
Alexander Misharin worked there for a long time in different positions including as the Head.

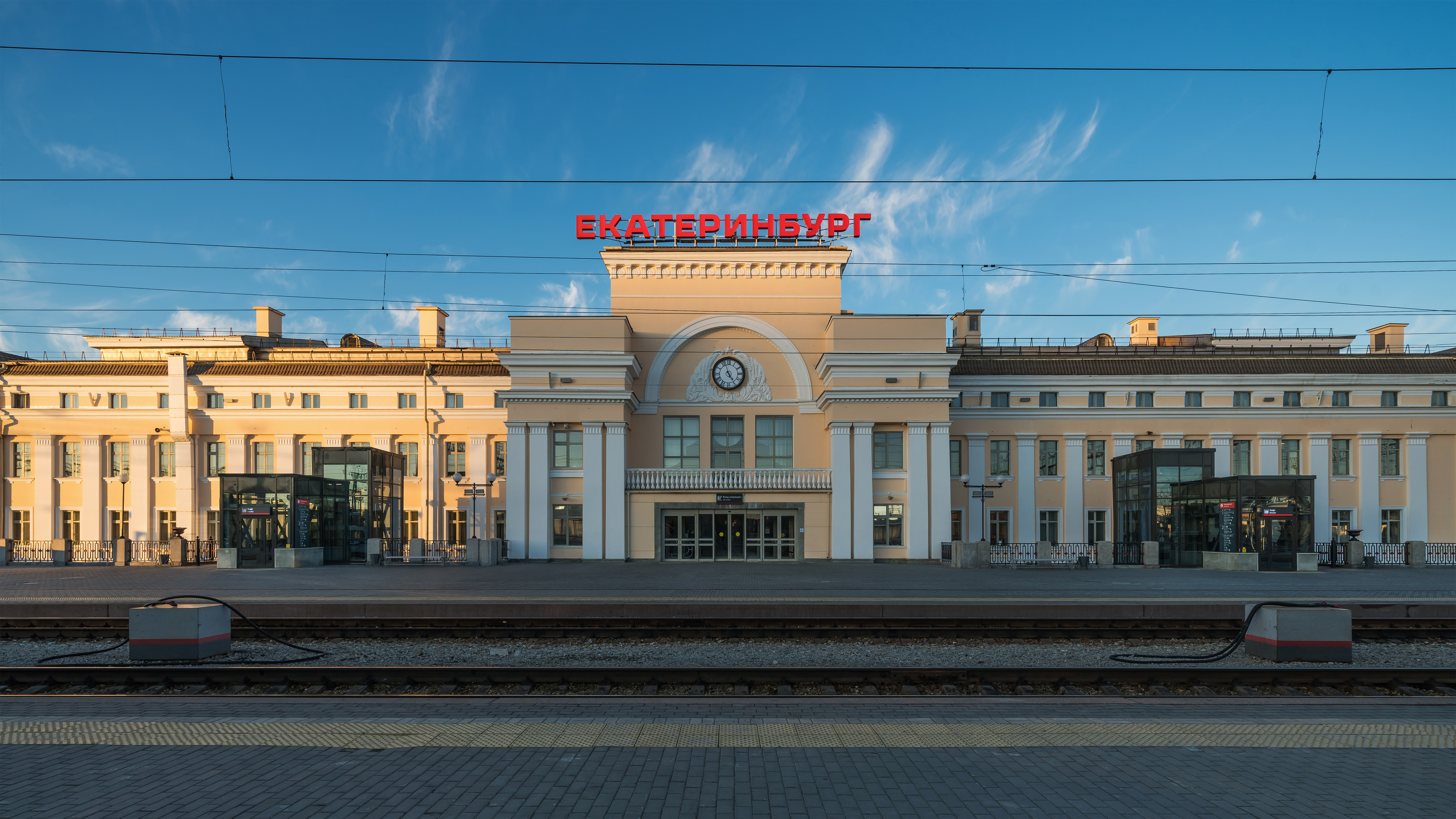
Yekaterinburg Railway station

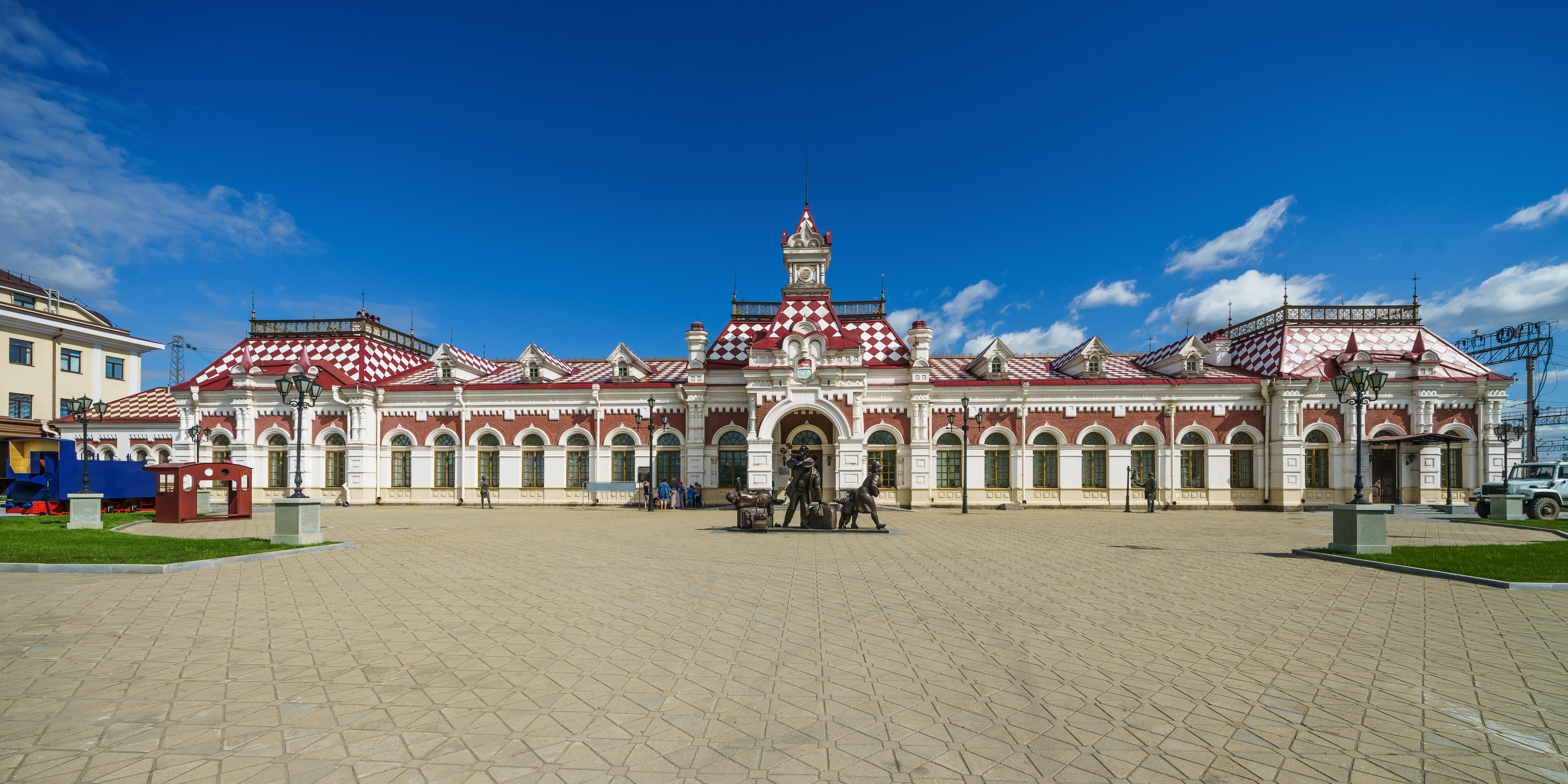
Sverdlovsk Railway Museum (former train station, built in 1878)

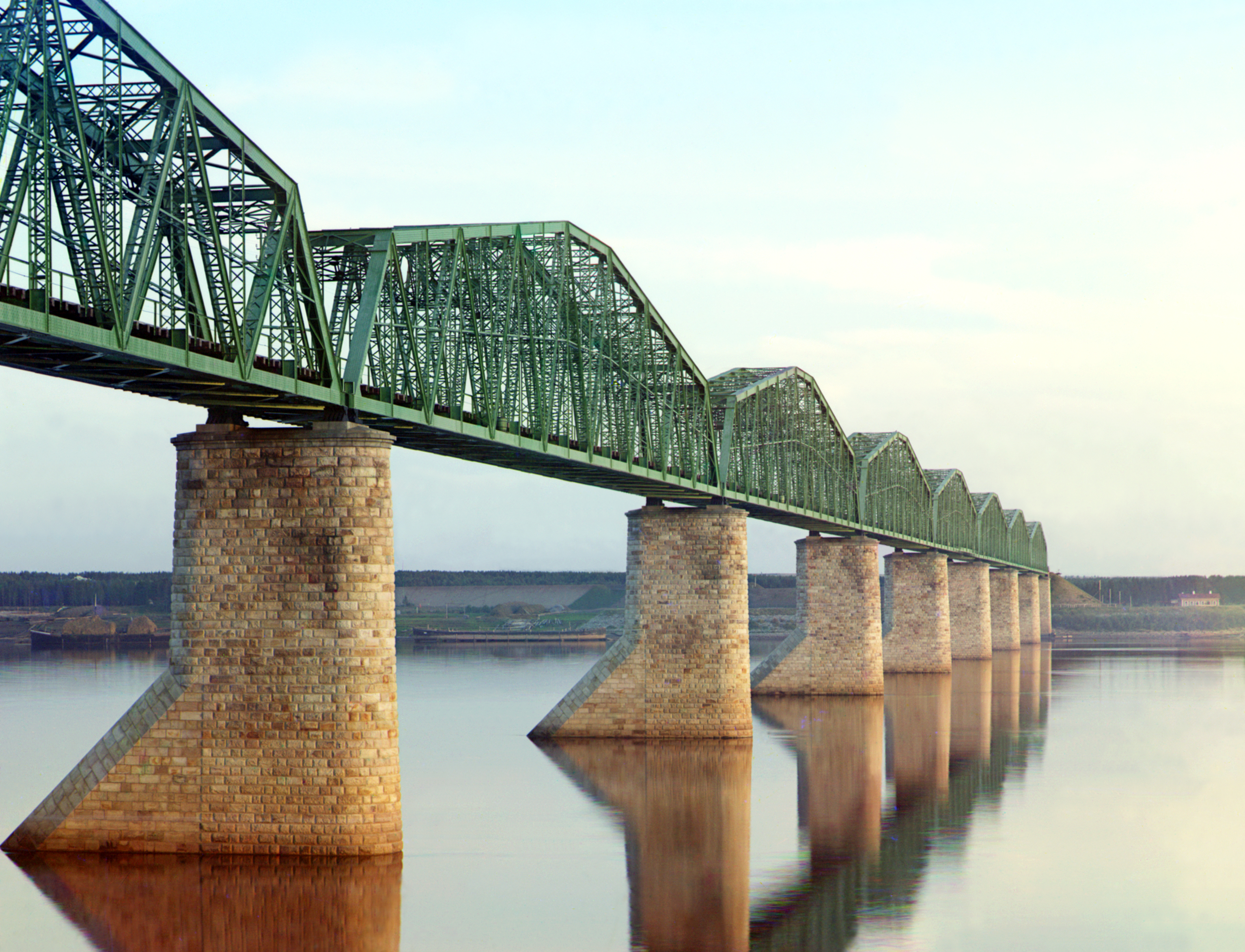
A bridge across the Kama River (a Prokudin-Gorsky photograph, ca 1912)

== See also ==
- Ural State University of Railway Transport
