= Chuvash National Radio =

Radio station in Russia

- Russia
- Broadcast area: Chuvash Republic
- Frequencies: 3rd channel of radio broadcasting FM 103.0 Cheboksary; FM 105.0 Tsivilsk; 72.41 Ibresi

Programming
- Format: Contemporary hit radio

Ownership
- Owner: Cultural Department, Chuvash Republic

History
- First air date: 25 April 2009; 17 years ago

Links
- Website: http://gov.cap.ru/main.asp?govid=681

Chuvash National Radio (Russian: Национальное радио Чувашии, Chuvash: Чӑваш наци радиовӗ) is a Chuvash-language radio station based in Cheboksary, broadcasting in many Chuvash Republic cities, and via the internet.

Its director and chief editor is Oleg Prokopiev.

== History ==
Chuvash National Radio began a test announcement on 25 April 2009, coinciding with the annual Day of the Chuvash Language.

The formation of Chuvash National Radio occurred in three stages. The first stage was from April to May 2009, featuring news and musical programmes, as well as programmes for children. The second stage began on 1 September 2009 with news and programmes for children and youth and literary drama programmes. Since 1 January 2010, the radio station airs full-time programming.

According to the Ministry of Culture of the Chuvash Republic, the goal of creating a Chuvash radio station from the ground up is the development of a system of information support for the population, upholding constitutional law regarding the reception of socially significant information, and the ability to notify residents in case of emergency situations.

== Programming ==
=== Programming ===
60% of programming is in the Chuvash language, 35% in Russian and 5% in other languages spoken in the Chuvash Republic. 30% of programs are informational, 30% educational and 20% drama and musical. Informational programs leave five hours per day.

=== Radio frequencies ===
On the basis of the transferring equipment of branch FGUP «Radio television transmitting centre» two frequencies are assigned to Chuvash National Radio: VHF 71.41 MHz (the transmitter is located in Ibresi) and FM 105.0 MHz (the transmitter is located in Tsivilsk). By means of these transmitters 80% of the territory of the Chuvash Republic, except for Cheboksary and Novocheboksarsk, is covered. According to federal law, on-air broadcasting in cities with a population of over 100,000 is authorized only on the basis of a license. It, in turn, is given out after federal competition is carried out. Therefore, as of 2009 in Cheboksary and Novocheboksarsk it is only possible to listen to Chuvash National Radio broadcasts on the "third button" wire announcement.

=== Online broadcast ===
The radio's programming is broadcast online using Microsoft Media Server.

== Programmes ==
There are a number of program topics and formats. Topics include event announcements, memorial calendars, incidents, sports news, interviews, and commentary.

Musical programmes are aired no less than three hours per day: a "musical mix" (live concerts), youth musical hour and musical blocks per programme for children and youth, in blocks of social programs. Popular music of various genres – in Chuvash and Russian as well as foreign music – is offered to listeners.

Special place is given to programs on public health services, social policy, and education issues. Educational programmes are divided by age: for young children, school-aged children and youth.

Literary-drama programs are aired on the days off. In these blocks news, the literary-drama, musical, children's and youth programs, the special program «Year of the farmer», the total information-analytical program, programs of a social orientation and the special project «the House and an economy» also are assumed.

Chuvash National Radio also features radio performances from the Chuvash State Academic Drama Theater and the Chuvash State Youth Theater.

Each region and city in the Chuvash Republic have the certain day of an announcement. Daily "inclusions" from rural area and a city of Chuvashiya are on air planned. In an air special cycles and headings about life of the Chuvash diaspora in the Russian regions and abroad also are presented.

=== Chuvash programmes ===
- Ҫӗнӗ кӗнеке – 'New book', editor: Olga Barinova
- Ҫӗр Сум
- Ҫемье – 'Family', editor: Roza Dementsova
- Автан авӑтсан – 'Early morning', editor: Lira Leont'eva
- Асамлӑх ҫӗр-шывӗ – 'Fantastic country', editor: Oxana Alexandrova
- Асанне арчи – 'Grandmother's trunk', editor: Oxana Alexandrova
- Вӑрҫӑ ахрӑмӗ – editor: Roza Dementsova
- Ирхи концерт – 'Morning concert'
- Калаҫу урокӗ – 'Colloquial lesson', editor: Olga Barinova
- Каҫхи микс – 'Night mix', editor: Oxana Alexandrova
- Кучченеҫ – 'Gift', editor: Roza Dementsova
- Литература тӗнчи – 'Literary world', editors: Leonid Antonov, Marina Vyazanova
- Мумук халапӗсем – 'Moomok's tales', editor: Valery Iovlev
- Пархатар – 'Gratitude', editor: Arseny Tarasov
- Пирӗн хӑнасем – 'Our guests', editor: Roza Dementsova
- Радио библиотека – 'Radio library'
- Республика сасси – 'Voice of the Republic'
- Тӑван ен историйӗ – 'Homeland's history', editor: Olga Barinova
- Тӗнчекурӑм – 'Television', editor; Roza Dementsova
- Хыпарсем – 'News'
- Чӑваш халӑх йӑли-йӗрки – 'Chuvash people's tradition', editor: Olga Barinova
- Чӗрӗлӗх ҫути – 'Heart's light', editor: Roza Dementsova
- Чӗререн тухакан сӑмахсем – 'Cordial words', editor: Alena Terent'eva
- Эткер – 'Inheritor', editor: Roza Dementsova
- Ялтан яла – 'From village to village', editor: Vladimir Egorov
- Ялти бизнес – 'Rural business'

=== Russian programmes ===
- Беседы о Древней истории – editor: Julia Stepanova
- Бухты-барахты – editor: Marina Tolstova
- Голос Республики – editor: Voldemar Egorov
- Детские поздравлялки – editor: Marina Tolstova
- Жизнь как жизнь – editor: Jory Fedorov
- Концерт по заявкам – editor: Jory Fedorov
- Лето — детям – editor: Marina Tolstova
- Мальчик из Шоршел – editor: Marina Tolstova
- Мой дом, моя земля – editor: Julia Stepanova
- На перекрестках истории – editor: Alexander Shuldeshov
- Наши соотечественники – 'Our owners', editor: Julia Stepanova
- Не формат – 'Non-format', editor: Jory Fedorov
- Новости. Итоги дня
- Новости – 'News'
- Общественная приёмная – editor: Jory Fedorov
- Открытый разговор
- Прогулки по музеям – editor: Julia Stepanova
- Радио микс – 'Radio mix'
- Символ веры – editor: Julia Stepanova
- Согласие – editor: Julia Stepanova
- Старая пластинка – editor: Jory Fedorov
- Территория правды
- Техноскоп – editor: Jory Fedorov
- Школьная страна – editor: Alexander Shuldeshov
- Экстренный час – editor: Alexander Valeev

== See also ==
- Chuvash National Movement
- Chuvash National Broadcasting Company
- Radio of Chuvashia
- ChuvashTet
- Chuvash Wikipedia
- List of Chuvashes
- Chuvash National Museum
- Chuvash National Congress
