= Chuvash nationalism =

Belief that Chuvash people constitute a nation

The flag of Chuvashia

Chuvash nationalism or the Chuvash national movement (Chuvash: Чӑваш наци юмӑхӗ) is the belief that the Chuvash people are a nation. The movement, which originated in the 16th century, has included the evasion of taxes and duties, local armed actions, petitions to the authorities, withdrawal to regions weakly controlled by the state, participation in large-scale anti-government protests, and persistent resistance to mass Christianization.

== Origins ==
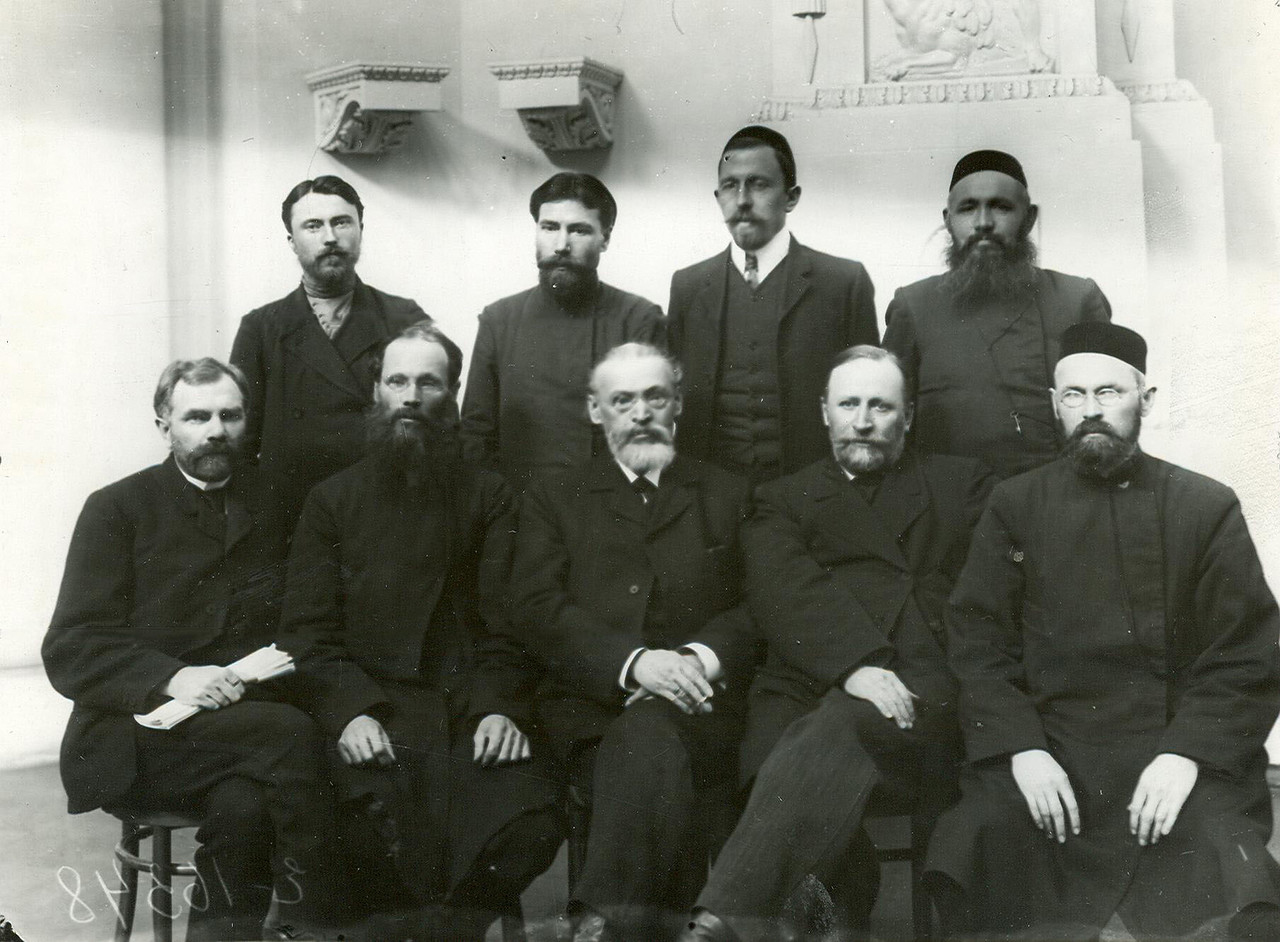
Deputies of the Second State Duma from Kazan Governorate in 1907: (standing) Grigory Petrukhin, Aleksandr Fyodorov, Sadri Maksudi Arsal, Gumer Musin; (seated): Zinoviy Talantsev, Mikhail Baturov, Mikhil Kapustin, Dmitry Kushnikov and Safiulla Maksyutov

The reforms of Alexander II and related socioeconomic, political and religious changes began a new era for the peoples of the Volga region. A significant factor in the national mobilization of the Chuvash people was the liberalization of social and political life in the legal and educational spheres. Nikolay Ilminsky, Nikolai Zolotnitsky, Ivan Yakovlev, Ilya Ulyanov, and Simbirsk Chuvash teacher's school played an important role in the development of education and culture among the Chuvash population. Socioeconomic changes during the second half of the 19th century formed the basis of Chuvash nationalism and its slogans, political interests, and demands.

At the turn of the 19th century, the Chuvash people consolidated with the Chuvash language and culture. By the early 20th century, 78 percent of the Chuvash people lived in seven adjacent counties of Kazan and Simbirsk Governorates. In the century's first decade, the national movement of the Chuvash people moved from a phase characterized by national educators and patriotic cultural figures to the spread of self-awareness among the Chuvash. The third phase of Chuvash nationalism ended as a mass movement with political slogans and a network of national organizations formed for ethnic emancipation in 1917.

== 1905 revolution ==
The Volga-region national movement was accelerated by the Russian Revolution of 1905, which intertwined sociopolitical, economic, and national contradictions and conflicts. Nationalistic ideas were first proposed by the young Chuvash intelligentsia: teachers, priests, and lawyers. Many were students at the Simbirsk Chuvash teacher's school, but were dissatisfied with Ivan Yakovlev's objectives. Most of the Chuvash intelligentsia shared the ideas of the Socialist Revolutionary Party, which had a great influence on Chuvash nationalism; Chuvash party members demanded national and cultural autonomy. The January 1906 publication of the newspaper Khypar contributed to nationalist unity, and played a role in the state Duma elections. Chuvash parliamentarians Y. A. Abramov, N. P. Efremov, D. A. Kushnikov, K. V. Lavrsky, I. I. Sokolov, Z. M. Talantsev and A. F. Fedorov, regardless of party affiliation, encouraged education and national equality.

The revolution attracted Chuvash peasants, and agriculture was included with sociopolitical and nationalistic demands: civil rights and freedoms, equality of languages, education in the Chuvash language, the local election of judges, the use of Chuvash in legal proceedings, and local Chuvash government. Youth and political radicals entered Chuvash social life from 1905 to 1907, supplementing national unification based on education and culture with an emphasis on political consciousness and the class struggle for the social liberation of the Chuvash people. Chuvash sociopolitical thought, based on liberal enlightenment, largely emphasized cultural and national autonomy; the idea of territorial autonomy was only proposed by I. N. Yurkin and G. A. Korenkov.

== After the February Revolution ==
After the February Revolution of 1917, Chuvash nationalism developed n the framework of multi-ethnic territories of the peoples of the Volga-Kama region and small national congresses. The first national Chuvash associations began emerged in spring 1917. The Ufa Chuvash national society was created on 27 March, chaired by G. I. Komissarov, and a network of Chuvash national organizations (provincial, county and rural) was formed by summer.

A number of clergymen, including P. P. Shlenkin, D. F. Filimonov, T. A. Zemlyanitsky, G. T. Tikhonov, A. S. Ivanov and K. P. Prokopiev, became Chuvash nationalists. They supported the appointment of Chuvash priests to Chuvash parishes, the introduction of Chuvash in worship, and the installation of a Chuvash bishop. Revived on 1 May 1917, Khypar called for Chuvash unity.

A feature of the post-February period was the democratization of political institutions. Chuvash people were elected to chair the civil, Cheboksary, and Yadrin Zemstvo councils for the first time, and could participate in social and political life in councils of deputies, peasant congresses and unions, and soldiers' organizations.

The county peasant congresses discussed national self-determination and Russia's administrative and territorial structure. Chuvash military committees spawned a new generation of political leaders, including A. D. Krasnov, D. P. Petrov and G. T. Titov. The diversity of Chuvash nationalism after the February Revolution was reflected in teachers' unions and the Union of Chuvash students, a social space for the development of social and civic Chuvash society.

February 1917 stimulated multi-partyism, bringing to the forefront the liberal and socialist parties which articulated their visions. Political parties except for the Black Hundreds, operating in the Chuvash region, demanded autonomy in the Russian state. The leaders of the socialist revolutionaries, in the party's summer 1917 program goals, advocated a democratic republic with proportional representation. The platform of the Chuvash national movement was adopted at the All-Chuvash National Forum in June 1917 in Simbirsk, which elected the members of the Chuvash National Society.

== After the October Revolution ==
The overthrow of the Russian Republic and the transfer of power into the hands of a coalition of Bolsheviks and Left Socialist-Revolutionaries in October 1917 reconfigured political forces in the country. The Russian Soviet Federative Socialist Republic proclaimed in its decrees the de jure right of the peoples of Russia to self-determination until the formation of an independent state. Largely under this influence, at the end of 1917 the national leaders of the Tatars and Bashkirs proposed a plan for regional autonomy of the Middle Volga region and the Urals (Volga-Ural state, Ural-Volga state, Middle Volga and South Ural state, Volga-Kama state, Volga-Ural Soviet Republic or Tatar-Bashkir Soviet Republic).

In discussions about its creation, the main requirements of the Chuvash representatives were the equality and sovereignty of the nation and cultural autonomy; the state was seen as part of Russia, and its administrative unit as a regional federal republic. The final position in disputes about the Tatar-Bashkir Soviet Republic was expressed at the June 1918 all-Chuvash workers and peasants congress, which opposed the inclusion of the Chuvash people.

Between February and March 1918, there was a split in the Chuvash national movement between left- and right-wing groups which ended in a leftist victory. Leftists included the Socialist-Revolutionaries, the Chuvash Socialist-Nationalist Party, and soldiers, teachers, and students who supported the Bolsheviks. They seized the property of the newspaper Khypar from the rightist Socialist-Revolutionaries, and began publishing Kanash. The Chuvash Left Socialist Committee was formed on 5 March, and at its initiative the Commissariat for Chuvash Affairs under the Kazan Provincial Council was established.

The final disengagement by Chuvash nationalist leaders occurred in the summer of 1918, when a group of Chuvash delegates to the Constituent Assembly (G. F. Alunov, S. N. Nikolaev, D. P. Petrov, G. T. Titov, and I. V. Vasiliev) moved to the anti-Soviet camp. However, the movement continued its Soviet-party organization. In 1918–19 in Kazan, Simbirsk, Samar and Saratov provinces, Chuvash sub-departments arose in the provincial departments of the Soviet executive committees and created corresponding sections in the provincial committees of the RCP(b); the Chuvash sections also operated in the political departments of Red Army headquarters and revolutionary military councils. The central Soviet institution was the Chuvash Department of the People's Commissariat for Nationalities of the RSFSR, headed by D. S. Elmen.

== Autonomy ==
Since 1918, Chuvash nationalist leaders began to lean towards the idea of a Chuvash administrative unit and labor commune. The Chuvash Autonomous Region became the Chuvash ASSR.

There was a network of national educational institutions in Bashkiria, Tatarstan, Simbirsk, Samara, and other provinces. Chuvash newspapers were published in Samara and Kazan, and the Chuvash-language Voice of Workers newspaper was published in Moscow. Chuvash national administrative-territorial units were formed in Bashkiria, Simbirsk province, Tatar ASSR, Saratov Governorate, Kazakhstan, and Siberia. During the 1920s, there was Chuvash representation in the Central Party and Soviet bodies and institutions.

The abandonment of the New Economic Policy and Joseph Stalin's rise to power were accompanied by the reduction of democratic processes, and the prevailing trend since the early 1930s was towards unification; nationalism was discouraged. The network of Chuvash representation in Moscow was liquidated, and publication of the Chuvash newspaper Kommunar was suspended. Official documents omitted mentioning Chuvash living outside the ASSR, and the merger of nationalities into one "Soviet people" was proclaimed during the mid-1960s.

== Perestroika ==
National relations began to change during perestroika. Since the late 1980s, Chuvash nationalism has again increased. One of its forms was the Coordination Center for Support of Creative Youth (CSCY) at the Chuvash regional Committee of the Komsomol, established in April 1987. The CSCY consisted of young writers, artists, actors, scientists, humanitarians, and students. Its events sparked discussions about the early-20th-century artistic and poetic avant-garde, the status of native languages and the future of national cultures, and the national right to free political, economic and cultural development.

In the spring of 1988, a group of Transbaikal State University researchers created the sociopolitical Society of I. ya. Yakovlev. Its goals included moral, social and national revival; linking the cultural aspirations of all Chuvash people, regardless of where they live; the economic, political and cultural sovereignty of the Chuvash Autonomous Republic; the preservation and development of national traditions (including Chuvash as a state language), and the study and popularization of Yakovlev's heritage. After discussion in the Chuvash mass media, a meeting about the society was held on 30 November 1988.

== ChsCC and CNC ==
The founding congress of the Chuvash Social and Cultural Center (ChSCC) was held in December 1989, and M. N. Yukhma was elected chair. In February and March 1990, the Council of Ministers of the Chuvash ASSR approved the ChsCC's charter and platform. The founding congress of the Chuvash National Revival Party (Chuvash Atalanu Party, CHAP) was held in March 1991 for Chuvashia's economic and political sovereignty. The founding congress of the Chuvash National Congress (CNC) was held on 9 October 1992 to implement full state sovereignty, and Atner Khoosanguy was elected chair.

Chuvash national and cultural associations have existed in Russia since the late 1980s, primarily in the Volga region (the republics of Bashkortostan and Tatarstan and the Ulyanovsk and Samara regions), where most Chuvash people live outside Chuvashia. Cultural organisations were founded in Moscow and St. Petersburg, in the CIS countries (Kazakhstan, Moldova, Ukraine) and the Baltic states (Latvia and Estonia). After the Russian government adopted the Law On National-Cultural Autonomy in 1996, the Chuvash National-Cultural Autonomy (ChNCA) movement began to form. There were 85 Chuvash cultural organisations in Russia in 2011, including 25 national-cultural groups. Most Chuvash cultural organisations are engaged in activities such as the creation of folklore groups, celebrating traditional Chuvash holidays, publishing newspapers, folklore, and history books, initiatives to support Chuvash education (including the study of Chuvash language and literature), and producing Chuvash radio and television programs.

== See also ==
- Annexation of Chuvashia by the Tsardom of Russia
- Chuvash National Museum
- List of Chuvashes
- Chuvash Wikipedia
- Chuvash National Broadcasting Company
- Chuvash National Radio
- ChuvashTet
- Pugachev's Rebellion
- Shoorcha rebellion
- Stenka Razin

== Sources ==
- С.В. Щербаков, "Чувашское национальное движение 1917–1921 годах. Взлёты и падения." (Chuvash national movement of 1917–1921: Ups and downs).
