= Nikolai Zolotnitsky =

Russian Chuvash linguist

- Born: Nikolai Ivanovich Zolotnitsky; 3 December 1829; Cheboksarskiy uyezd, Kazan Governorate, Russian Empire
- Died: 14 May 1880 (aged 50); Kazan, Kazan Governorate, Russian Empire
- Education: Kazan University
- Scientific career
- Fields: linguist, comparative Turkologist, ethnographer, public figure
- Workplaces: Kazan Chamber of State Property, Ministry of Public Education, Kazan Mission School

Nikolai Zolotnitsky (3 December 1829, Cheboksarskiy uyezd, Kazan Governorate — 14 May 1880, Kazan, Kazan Governorate) was a Russian Chuvash linguist and one of the founders of national Chuvash scientific linguistics. He was also a comparative Turkologist, ethnographer, teacher, and public figure.

== Biography ==
He was born in the village of Pervoye Churashevo, Cheboksary uyezd (now the Mariinsko-Posadsky District of the Chuvash Republic) in the Kazan Governorate.

In 1851, he graduated from the Philological Faculty of Kazan University.

He served in the Kazan Chamber of State Property (1851–1854), then in the Chamber of State Property in the city of Vyatka (1855–1865), where he organized a Sunday school at the gymnasium and directed it.

In 1865, he began working in the Ministry of Public Education. In 1867, he was appointed to the Kazan School district, and was an inspector of Chuvash schools of the Kazan School District. From 1875 he worked at the Kazan Mission School.

He died on 14 May 1880 in Kazan.

== The main works ==
- Николай Золотницкий, "Отрывки из чувашско-русского словаря", Казань / Nikolai Zolotnitsky, Excerpts from the Chuvash-Russian dictionary. Kazan, 1874. — 48.
- Николай Золотницкий, "Корневой чувашско-русский словарь, сравненный с языками и наречиями разных народов тюркского, финского и других племен", Казань / Nikolai Zolotnitsky, Root Chuvash-Russian dictionary, compared with the languages and dialects of different peoples of the Turkic, Finnish, and other tribes. Kazan, 1875. — 279.
- Николай Золотницкий, "По вопросу о способах образования чуваш", Казань / Nikolai Zolotnitsky, On the question of ways of Chuvash education, Kazan, 1866. — 24.

== Literature ==
- Павлов, И. П. Н. И. Золотницкий пурнӑҫӗпе ӗҫӗсем / И. П. Павлов. — Шупашкар : Чӑвашгосиздат, 1958. — 64 с.
- Алексеев, А. Н. И. Золотницкий чӑваш халӑхне ҫутта кӑларассишӗн тунă ӗҫӗсем / А. Алексеев // Шкул реформин тапхӑрӗнче чӑваш чӗлхипе литератури вӗрентесси. — Шупашкар, 1988. — С. 51-62.
- Николай Золотницкий // Революцичченхи чӑваш литератури : текстсем. — Шупашкар, 1984. — I том. — С. 107.
- Павлов, И. П. Мухтава тивӗҫлӗ тĕпчевҫӗ / И. П. Павлов // Тӑван Атӑл. — 1979. — № 11. — С. 80.
- Родионов, В. Халӑх сӑмахлӑхне пухакансем. Малтанхи поэзи куҫарӑвӗсем / В. Родионов // Ялав. — 2003. — № 1. — С. 83-89.
- Юркин, И. Н. Николай Иванович Золотницкий // Юркин, И. Н. Повеçсем, прозӑлла сӑвӑсем, тӗрленчӗксем, асаилӳсем / И. Н. Юркин. — Шупашкар, 1986. — С. 259—261.
- Данилов А. П. Николай Золотницкий о способах образования чувашей и других нерусских народов // Данилов А. П. Зарождение, развитие публицистики и журналистики Чувашии / А. П. Данилов, И. Я. Тенюшев. — Чебоксары, 1999. — С. 49-54.
- Егоров, В. Г. Деятельность Н. И. Золотницкого по исследованию чувашского языка / В. Г. Егоров // О дореволюционной культуре чувашского народа : учен. зап. / НИИ яз., лит., истории и экономики при Совете Министров Чуваш. АССР. — Чебоксары, 1957. — Вып. 15. — С. 89-102.
- Егоров, Н. И. Золотницкий Николай Иванович / Н. И. Егоров // Чувашская энциклопедия. — Чебоксары, 2006. — Т. 1 : А-Е. — С. 71.
- Егоров, Н. И. Просветитель народов Поволжья / Н. И. Егоров // Ученые. — Чебоксары, 2006. — Т. 4. — С. 164—174. — (Б-ка Президента Чуваш. Респ.; т. 4).
- Ефимов, Е. Л. Духовное наследие Н. И. Золотницкого / Е. Л. Ефимов // Фольклорное и литературное отражение художественно-эстетической памяти народа = Халӑх пултарулӑхӗпе илемлĕх астӑвӑмӗ фольклорпа литературӑра палӑрса тӑни : [сб. ст.]. — Чебоксары, 2006. — С. 168—173.
- Ефимов, Л. А. О просветительской деятельности первых инспекторов чувашских школ Н. И. Золотницкого и И. Я. Яковлева и их взаимоотношениях / Л. А. Ефимов // Фольклорное и литературное отражение художественно-эстетической памяти народа = Халӑх пултарулӑхӗпе илемлӗх астӑвӑмӗ фольклорпа литературӑра палӑрса тăни : [сб. ст.]. — Чебоксары, 2006. — С. 45-55.
- Золотницкий Николай Иванович (1829—1880) // Библиографический словарь отечественных тюркологов : дооктябрьский период. — М., 1974. — С. 165—166.
- Золотницкий Николай Иванович // Исследователи этнографии и археологии Чувашии : биобиблиогр. словарь. — Чебоксары, 2004. — С. 96-98.
- Сейфуллин, В. Первый инспектор / В. Сейфуллин // Халӑх шкулӗ = Нар. шк. — 1992. — № 2. — С. 89-91.
- Терехова, О. П. Деятельность Н. И. Золотницкого по просвещению и экологическому воспитанию чувашей / О. П. Терехова // Сибир. пед. журн. — 2009. — № 9. — С. 222—232.
- Федотов, М. Р. Н. И. Золотницкий (1829—1880) // Федотов, М. Р. Исследователи чувашского языка / М. Р. Федотов. — Чебоксары, 1987. — С. 29-36.

== See also ==
- Chuvash National Movement
- Chuvash National Congress
