= List of Chuvashes =

A Chuvash is a member of the Chuvash people, an ethnic group living in Russia.

== Leaders and politicians ==
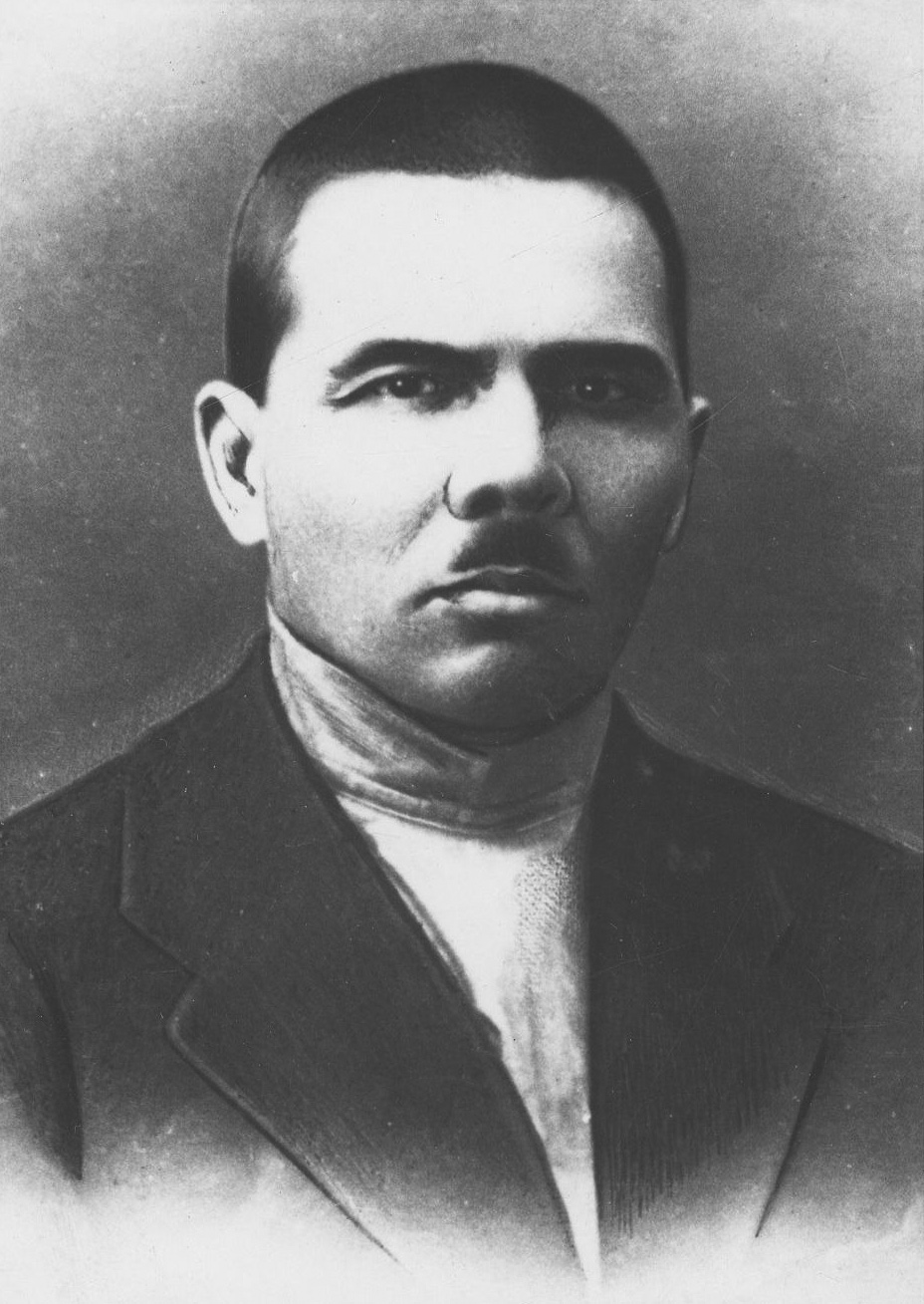
Daniil Elmen

- Vakrim (15th century) - Chuvash noble who left Golden Horde to become a vassal of Vasily the Blind.
- Mĕtri Căvaš (16th century) - hero of the siege of Kazan. Descendant of mărsa Vakrim, ancestor of Gavrila Derzhavin.
- Kamaj (16th century) - Chuvash mărsa at the service of Khan of Kazan who defected to the Russian side.
- Aransajpik (17th century) - Chuvash noble at Russian service who was granted 300 desiatinas of land around Şĕrpü (Tsivilsk).
- Daniil Elmen (1885–1932) - Chuvash statesman, first leader of Chuvash autonomy in Soviet Russia.
- Nikolay Fyodorov (b. 1958) - former president of Chuvashia.

== Military figures ==
- Iskej Pajtulĕ (17th century) - Chuvash poet, ataman (colonel) in the army of Stenka Razin.

== Religious figures ==
- Valĕm Huşa (12th century) - Volga Bulgar Muslim saint, highly revered by Chuvashes.
- Mehmet Huşa Celepi (16th century) - Chuvash convert to Islam, hajji (religious pilgrim) and scholar.
- Nikita Bichurin (1777–1853) - Christian archimandrite, orientalist. (perhaps quarter-Chuvash)

== Academic figures ==
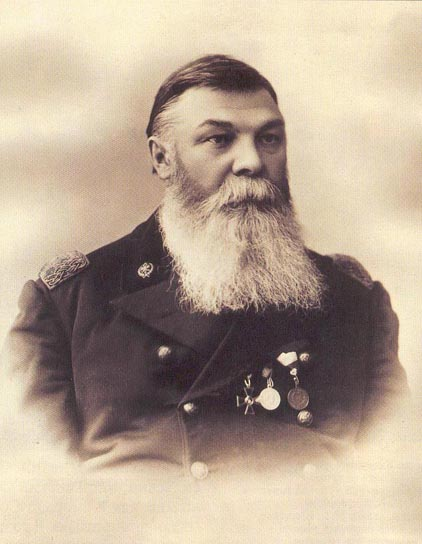
Ivan Yakovlev (educator).

=== Educators ===
- Ivan Yakovlev (1848–1930) - Chuvash patriarch, inventor of modern Chuvash alphabet.
- Gennady Volkov (1927–2010) - Chuvash educator, Academician of the Russian Academy of Education, founder of the ethnopedagogics.

=== Linguists ===
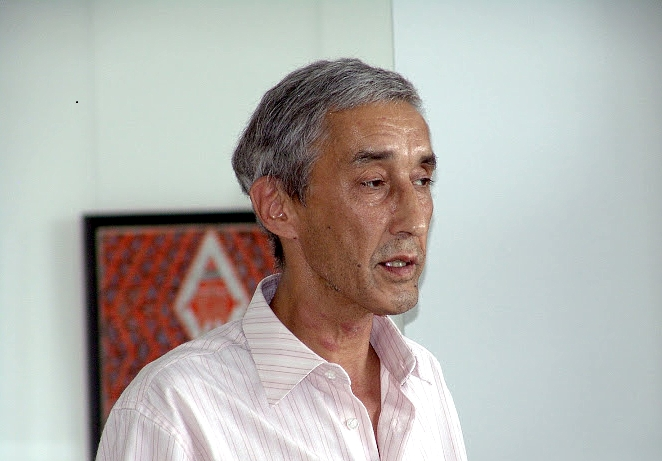
Atner Husankaj

- Atner Husankaj (b. 1948) - linguist and philologist, first president of Chuvash National Congress. Son of poet Petĕr Husankaj.

=== Journalists ===
- Nikolai Yut - Chuvash writer, folklorist and literary critic.

== Cultural figures ==
=== Actors and actresses ===
- Tany Youne (1903–1977) - first Chuvash theater actress, the first Chuvash film actress.
- Boris Markov - actor, famous music director, People's Artist of the Russia and Chuvash ASSR.

=== Architects ===
- Pyotr Yegorov (1731–1789) - author of the railing of Summer Garden.

=== Ballet dancers ===
- Nadezhda Pavlova (b. 1956) - famous ballet dancer, People's Artist of the USSR.

=== Musicians ===
- Alexey Aygi (b. 1971) - musician, son of Gennady Aygi.
- Elina Nechayeva - musician

=== Painters ===
- Aleksey Kokel (1880–1956) - painter
- Nikolai Ovchinnikov (1918–2004) - People's Painter of the RSFSR and Chuvashia.
- Praski Vitti (b. 1936) - Chuvash painter and illustrator.

=== Sculptors ===
- Gerasim Pileš (1913–1994) - writer, playwright, sculptor and graphicist.

=== Writers and poets ===
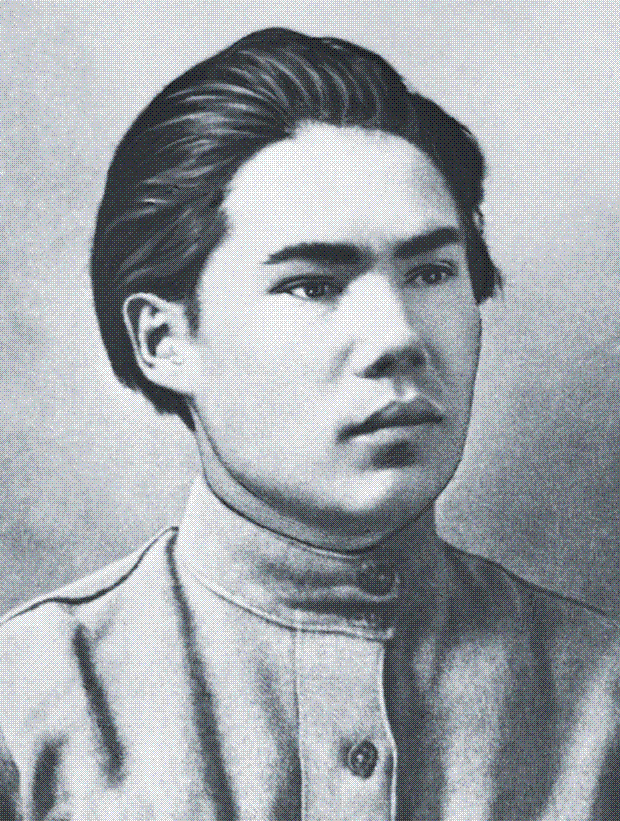
Mišši Śeśpĕl

- Emine (19th century) - Chuvash woman poet
- Kĕştenttin Ivanov (1890–1915) - poet, author of "Narspi".
- Mišši Śeśpĕl (1899–1922) - pioneer of Chuvash syllabotonic poetry
- Dimitri Isayev (1905–1930) - writer and literary critic
- Ille Tuktaš (1907–1957) - Chuvash writer, poet and folklorist, author of the anthem of Chuvashia.
- Anat Serep (1920–2003) - World War II veteran, writer
- Alexander Artemiev (1924–1998) - people's poet, writer and translator
- Arkady Malov (1928–1995) - Chuvash writer, journalist and translator
- Gennady Aygi (1934–2006) - poet and translator, father of Russian surrealist poetry
- Boris Căntăk (b. 1960) - writer, playwright and poet
- Vasley Mitta (1908–1957) - poet and translator
- Nikifor Mran'ka (1901–1973) - poet and dramatist
- Marina Karyagina (b. 1969) - poet

== Other figures ==
=== Cosmonauts ===
- Andriyan Nikolayev (1929–2004) - third Soviet cosmonaut, fifth man in space.

=== Sportspersons ===
- Svetlana Chirkova-Lozovaya (b. 1945) - fencer, two times olympic champion in foil team competition (1968 Summer Olympics in Mexico City and 1972 Summer Olympics in Munich).
- Veronika Chumikova
- Olimpiada Ivanova (b. 1970) - race walker, silver medalist of 2004 Summer Olympics in Athens.
- Irina Kalentyeva (b. 1977) - professional mountain bike racer, bronze medalist of 2008 Summer Olympics in Beijing.

== See also ==
- Chuvash Wikipedia
- ChuvashTet
- Chuvash National Museum
- Chuvash National Congress
