= Vattisen Yaly =

Revival of the ethnic religion of the Chuvash people

The Keremet (world tree) and Three stars (polar, sun, moon) on the flag of Chuvashia.

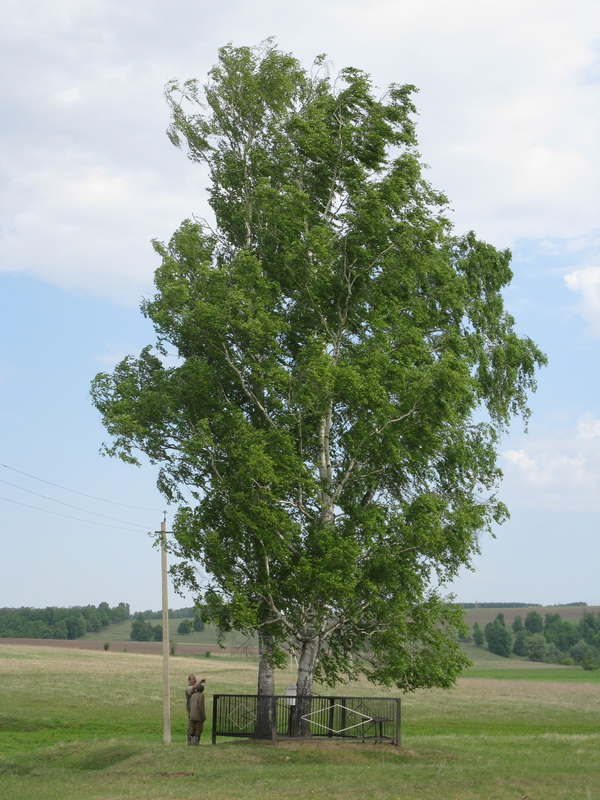
A keremet, object of worship in a village of Chuvashia.

Vattisen Yaly (Chuvash: Ваттисен йӑли, romanized: Vattisen yăli; Tatar: Ваттисен ялы, romanized: Wattisen yalı; lit. 'Ancestral traditions') is a contemporary revival of the ethnic religion of the Chuvash people, a Turkic ethnicity of Bulgar and Sabir ancestry mostly settled in the republic of Chuvashia and surrounding federal subjects of Russia.

Vattisen Yaly could be categorised as a particular form of Tengrism, a related revivalist movement of Central Asian traditional religion. However, Vattisen Yaly differs significantly from other forms of Tengrism in that the Chuvash have been heavily influenced by Finno-Ugric and Slavic cultures as well as those of other Indo-European speaking ethnicities. Their religion shows many similarities with Finnic and Slavic Paganisms; moreover, the revival of "Vattisen Yaly" in recent decades has occurred following Neopagan patterns. Today the followers of the Chuvash Traditional Religion are called "the true Chuvash". Their main god is Tura, a deity comparable to the Estonian Taara, the Germanic Thunraz and the pan-Turkic Tengri.

The Chuvash traditional religion boasts an unbroken continuity from pre-Christian times, having been preserved in a few villages of the Chuvash diaspora outside Chuvashia until modern times. In the late 1980s and early 1990s, together with the demise of the Soviet Union, a cultural and national revival blossomed among the Chuvash, and its leaders gradually embraced the idea of a return to indigenous Paganism, as did Chuvash intellectuals. The Chuvash identity movement looked to movements in the Baltic states for inspiration.

The national movement, meanwhile embodied in a Chuvash National Congress, carried on its "national religion" idea during the 1990s. Intellectuals started to recover and codify ancient rituals and started practicing them among the population both in cities and countryside villages, declaring themselves the guardians of tradition and the descendants of elder priests.

== Groups ==
In the mid-1990s, the proponents of the movement felt that to fulfill the role of a "national religion" and stand against world religions and cultural assimilation, Vattisen Yaly should be reconstructed and reformulated in institutional forms. A variety of groups emerged dedicated to the goal of reviving the Chuvash religion. A lot of publications on religion appeared, and artists and sculptors joined academic scholars in the creation of models for the construction of ritual-ceremonial complexes. Periodic prayers were introduced in public life by one of the groups, and it gave the religion the name of Sardash, which apparently comes from the Chuvash word sara, meaning "yellow". In Chuvash culture Sar, Sarat is an epithet of the Sun.

Arguments emerged among the groups and factions over matters such as theology and the national organisation of the religions. For instance, Iosif Dimitriev (Trer), an artist and enthusiastic follower of the religion and member of the "Chuvash National Religion" group, supports a tritheistic view centered on the god Tura, a mother goddess Ama, and a begotten god who is Tura reborn, and an organisation similar to that of the Catholic Church. V. Stan'ial, another influential intellectual of the same group, stands for a monistic view with god Tura as the main god and other gods as his manifestations, and an organisational model based on a traditional El'men or national religious leader, and an Aramchi or guardian of the faith in every town.

Another group is Turas (meaning "believer in the god Tura"), started by F. Madurov, which favours a nature religion approach and a pantheistic worldview, asserting that the goal of Chuvash religion is the "unity and harmony of nature, mankind, and Tura". The core of Madurov's position is the concept of the Keremet, the world tree, and the myth of Tura reborn in a tree growing from ashes, symbolizing the rebirth of man through nature.

The keremets are also sacred trees and traditional worship sites spread on Chuvash lands. The immediate goals of the Turas group are the creation of spiritual revival complexes on the sites of the keremets, and to turn them into cultural monuments and natural preserves.

Another phenomenon is the spontaneous revival of traditional village festivals (ialzri). On these occasions, reconstructed prayers and blessings (pil, pekhel) are performed along with ritual sacrifices. Such rituals are connected to community and family life, often involving rites of passage such as weddings, births, and anniversaries.

== Religion, Faith and Customs ==
Chuvash mythology and their traditional religion englobe the complex views, beliefs and cults of some of the Chuvash people, with many features of mythology and religion among the general Chuvash people being preserved in modern times, including traditional burial rites and a system of holidays and rituals.

The traditional religion among the Chuvash is called the “custom of the ancestors” (vattisen yăli), as well as “tӗne” (world order), and its adherents are called “true Chuvashs” (chăn chăvash). Islam is called tutar tĕni (Tatar worldview), Christianity is called vyrăs tĕni (Russian worldview), and non-believers are called "tĕne kĕmen" (those who did not enter the world). The etymology of the word "Tĕne" relates to the Chinese word 天 (Tian), and the word Tĕncheri Tură (Creator of Heaven) to the Turkic God Tengri ( 𐱅𐰭𐰼𐰃 *teŋri).

== Gods and spirits ==
In Chuvash mythology, according to V.K. Magnitsky, there were more than 210 gods and spirits of different ranks and functions devoted to them. They inhabited heaven, earth and the underworld. D. Meszaros pointed out about Chuvash monotheism, all the rest were only spirits (small creators).

The Chuvashs have only one main creator of "Tĕncheri Tură" - the Universal God, he is the creator of the world. He has many names and epithets, he is also called: the Supreme God (Şülti Tură), the Great God (Măn Tură), the God of the blue sky (Kăvak Tĕneri Tură), the One God (Pĕr Tĕncheri Tură), the Elder God (Aslă Tură) and Senior Father (Aslachi) and Father (Aşa). Initially, the word Aşa in the Chuvash language meant father heaven, and Ama meant mother earth. After that, everything in the world had a father and a mother, like yin and yang. All other small tură (creators) only serve him and are spirits (shiv turri - the creator of water, syvlash turri - the creator of air). In fact, the Chuvashs do not have the concept of God, as such, rather, it is inherent in other peoples, the Chuvashs have the concept of only spirit creators, according to the Chuvash beliefs, everything that exists on earth and in heaven has its own creator spirits (tură) in the form father and mother, with no way to explain natural and physical phenomena, the occurrence of certain chemical processes, they attributed to this the term "tură" - "creator". For example, "Hĕvel amăshĕ" and "Hĕvel ashshĕ" - the mother and father of the sun, a dualistic term for the emergence of all things was attributed to all things and phenomena. The rest of the characters are borrowed from the folklore of neighboring peoples: Vupăr - from the Russian Upyr' (eng. Vampire), Albasta - Tatar "Al bas" (strangler), Shuitan - Arab "Satan" and so on.

Kind:

- Tură - translated Creator (from Turĕ)
- Tĕncheri Tură (Aslo Aşa) - the Creator of the Universe (world), the highest and most important in the pantheon (he has many epithets).
- Ama (Kuk amay) - Goddess mother, mother earth, god of fertility, patroness of women and children (Turk. Umai)
- Kebe - god distributor of fates (sometimes Kawaba - umbilical cord)
- Pihampar - the god protector (patron), endows people with good qualities, sends prophetic visions; (fig. white wolf - prince of wolves)
- Pyulekhsche - a savior, a keeper, a seer, gives people an unlucky or happy lot, the god of luck.
- Surlan - northern lights, childbearing kite, distributes the souls of babies
- Irih - the spirit of the guardian of the clan, family; the legacy of ancestors
- Pireshti - good spirit, angel (translated as: faceless, without image)
- Khertsurt - Warming house, keeper of the hearth.
- Kherle shyr is a kind spirit living in heaven, on the edge of the earth.
- Vite husi - the owner of the barn

Harmful:

- Uzal - the spirit of all evil in the world
- Albasta - an evil creature in the form of a woman with four breasts (from Tat.)
- Arzyuri - spirit, master of the forest, goblin
- Vubar - an evil spirit, a ghoul, sent diseases, attacked a sleeping person
- Woodash - an evil spirit that lives in water (from finno-ugric water)
- Kele - is an evil spirit.
- Wupkan - is an evil spirit that sends diseases, invisible or in the form of a dog.
- Esrel - the spirit of death
- Shuitan - Satan
- Sekhmet - is the god of anger, wind, misfortune and misfortune. (Chuvash-Russian Dictionary of Nikolsky p. 170)
- Tecmele - the name of the spirit
- Khurachun - the owner of the black soul, darkness, cold and gloom
- Iye - spirit, brownie, living in baths, mills, abandoned houses, barns, etc.

Idol

Yĕrĕkh - a clay doll, according to the traditional beliefs of the Chuvash, this is the deity guardian of the hearth and family, in translation it means "ancestral heritage". It was presented mainly in a female form, more often as an invisible one. He was given a place to live - Yĕrĕkh pĕrni: a basket hung at a height inaccessible to children in a hut or other buildings, more often in a corner of the hut. The main requirement of the deity is a peaceful life in the family and society, the reproduction of the family and its protection. Typical was the prayer of Yorekh in the ancestral home. It was always given to girls getting married. So the erechs were passed down from generation to generation for centuries, so as not to lose touch with the roots, with the family, so that the ancestors protected the family. He was fed gruel and bread when family members were sick.

In some ethnographic groups, the Chuvash - Yĕrĕha was considered the first son of the god Tĕncheri Tură, from which he was given the following name: Heir. In honor of him, temples were built under the name "Yrsamay", which was later called "Keremet" during the Golden Horde and the Islamic period. It was believed that the son of Tură, whom the Chuvash called Yĕrĕkh, could punish for extra worry. Therefore, in the so-called Yrsamai (Keremet) sanctuaries, it was impossible to make noise, come with dirty thoughts, swear, or disturb for no reason. Instigated by Usal (Evil), people killed him and burned him. In order to hide what they had done from God, the ashes were scattered to the wind, and yrsamay (kiremet) were formed everywhere. Keremet (Arabic word) and Yrsamay (in Chuvash) is only the name of a temple, a prayer place, but in Russian in the source of the monuments that Keremet was a god - which was a mistake.

Yĕrĕkh was originally an image of the Turkic Erlik, one of the creators of the earth, many years later, with the advent of Christianity and the adoption of Orthodoxy by the Chuvash, he was renamed Shuitan (Satan). Christian missionaries considered the Chuvash idols to be pagan demons. After that, the Chuvashs began to get rid of the Yĕrĕhs and float them down a stream or river.

Following the example of Tĕncheri Tură, his son Yĕrĕkh also began to equip the land, to repeat after father, they were the first to create trees and grasses.

The Almighty Tură created beautiful trees and said: they will ripen various seeds, which will be scattered all over the world with the help of the wind and will sprout where they fall. Seeds ripened and scattered around the world. They sprouted into the most beautiful flowers and herbs, the most beautiful shrubs and trees, amazing and delicious fruits ripened on them, they were fragrant with delicious aromas. Yĕrĕhu also wanted to follow the example of his father and make his contribution to the universe. Tura at that time was creating Rowan. Yĕrĕh began to spy on his older brother. He looks, and the flowers are white, and the leaves are beautiful, and the berries are red. He wanted to do the same! He twists and turns, but the trees do not turn out beautiful like his brother's. It looks like it, but the flowers do not smell so delicious, the trunk is not so powerful and tall, the leaves stick together, and the berries are bitter-bitter ... Since then, the herbs and trees created by Yĕreh, unfortunately, have only thorns and bad properties. They have no fruits, and if they do, they are poisonous. So, according to the ideas of the Chuvash, good trees and bad trees appeared.

Mythical creatures

- Astakha
- Ashapatman
- Very Sĕlen
- Pireshti
- Shorgons
- Kuygarash
- Semruk

Constellations

The name of the constellations may differ for different groups of Chuvash.

- Mount Aramazi - from it the Chuvash descended to earth along the rainbow (Asamat kepere)
- Surlan - northern lights (god of birth)
- Uša (Aşa, Ulçebi, Тĕne Tĕnelĕ) - polar star (staff of Tĕncheri Tură)
- Yuman - Orion (tree of kind)
- Yuman pisĕkhi - Orion's belt (Chuvash poles and keremets are tied with a towel in the middle)
- Păshi (lashi) - Elk (sometimes Horse) / Big Dipper
- Avtan (akăsh) - Rooster (sometimes Swan) / Ursa Minor
- Kăvakal yăvi - Duck's Nest (Pleiades)
- Chulpan (Shuşămpuş) - the planet Venus
- And - rowan bush, ducks, swallow, raven, cuckoo, lion bird, and others.

Migratory birds winter near Tĕncheri Tură. Most of all, he loves the swallow (constellation), which fearlessly nests under his very staff, while other birds (constellations) stay away from him. In accordance with this, the Milky Way was also called the "road of the birds"; birds (constellations) went to winter in this Milky Lake.

Ulyp was chained to Mount Aramazi (from the Chuvash Yrămaş - Paradise), corresponds to the constellation Orion.

The constellation of mountain ash is also an important element and a cult among the Chuvash. Rowan, in general, is considered one of the most characteristic trees for the Chuvash people. It is very important that it grows within the boundaries of each house. Mountain ash was especially revered by riding Chuvash. They planted it right in the garden. This is due to the fact that the tree was created by Tura himself. So it is sacred. Can consecrate the area in which it is located. It can block the path of all evil creatures and people with evil thoughts. at the first pasture of cattle, animals are driven with rowan branches. Previously, animals were chased out with rowan rods and forced to cross over the poker. Rowan berries were placed in the foundation of the house. A wedding structure “Shilĕk” was created from young mountain ash, etc. Rowan was actively used in folk medicine. The Chuvash appreciated its flowers, berries and bark. Rowan branches were also obligatorily used at weddings, decorating the yard with them. In the past, rowan groves grew on sacred shrine sites, as the rowan provided magical protection. Clusters of mountain ash are hung at the entrance to the cattle pen and at the door lintel, or planted at the gate to protect themselves from the evil eye and damage. Rowan beads are considered the strongest remedy for any alien witchcraft. Rowan was also used to protect small children and babies from the evil eye and damage. Chuvash for this purpose put on a child a necklace of mountain ash. Protective runes were usually cut on rowan wood. A shaky (săpka) was hung to a pole from a flexible and durable young trunk of Rowan. A tincture was made from its bark, frozen berries were eaten after burning, it increases resistance to oxygen starvation. There was a belief that the supreme god Tĕncheri Tură found refuge from his enemies on Rowan. According to some beliefs, she is a distant ancestor of the first sacred tree of goodness on Earth, which withered with the advent of evil forces on our planet. At the end of the rite of public sacrifice Uchuk, boys and teenagers cut rowan rods with which they beat the walls of buildings in order to expel evil spirits from there. In the rite "Sĕren" for the same purpose, they went around the huts with freshly cut rods of Rowan, whipped households, clothes, buildings, inventory, cattle. Rowan leaves and branches were also used as elements protecting against spoilage, the leaves were stabbed into the hair and attached to the bride's headdress. A rowan amulet in the form of a hammer or a trident (Symbols of Tĕncheri Tură) was worn as a talisman against evil spirits (goblin, vulture, etc.) and corruption (evil eye). For the "liberation" of the Moon (lunar eclipse), a split forked branch of Rowan was thrown from the mouth of the spirit of Vubyr to the sky. It was believed that a plentiful harvest of Rowan fruits precedes a difficult year for children. If you stand under a mountain ash, then lightning will not strike you. You can’t cut down a mountain ash, otherwise your family will disappear.

The name of the constellations in dialects may differ.

== Priests ==
Yrămsă, Yumsă, Machavar - - people with mythical power; among the people he was called a miracle creator, sage, prophetic, healer, sorcerer, benefactor, etc. His actions aimed at achieving goodness were presented as the creation of a microcosm and were accompanied by spells, incantations, hymns-recitatives. Their text often contained the formula for calling Ash, which was repeated 3, 5, 7, 9 times, which was associated with ideas about the magical power of odd numbers. The number of repetitions of the formula depended on the strength of the desire to achieve the goals. In the practice of priests, during sacrificial ceremonies, they played with the creations of the world, and for healing people they used a dualistic system, a system of counting and four elements (earth and air, fire and water). If the goal of the healer is to cure a person, return him to our world, make sure that he can function calmly and without obstacles and fulfill his duties in the Light-Middle World. The healer must return him, dying, to the kingdom of the living, to create life again. Return the world of a specific, individual person to the number of seventy-seven worlds. Therefore, he starts from the very beginning: he pronounces the sequence of the creation of the world. But words alone are not enough. This whole process still needs to be beaten. He begins to create fire (stone against stone, ignites herbs and mushrooms), begins to spray the patient with the purest spring water, blows on him (creates wind) and pours all the dirt into the ground (she gave birth, she will take away). All these phenomena are the primary elementals, the foundations of our universe.

Kelepuse - head of prayers, assistant priest.

Tuhatmăsh - witch

== Temple ==
The Chuvash went to pray at their temples, which were called Yrsamay (Keremet) - according to the Chuvash, this is a miniature version of the universe. It comes from the word "yră - good, good" suffix -sam (plural) and the Turkic suffix -ay "holy" (approx. Aya Sophia - saint). The word "Keremet" has a similar translation from Arabic. کرامة “karamat” is a miracle.

Usha yubi (Ulchepi, Ulche yubi) - The Chuvash considered the kitchen to be the main place in the house and called it "tĕpel" (the main place) it served as an atrium, there they put a "pillar of Usha" in front of the stove. The most ancient version, about which information has been preserved, was a hollow pillar. It was placed under the mat in the front corner of the stove in the middle of the hut, from it under the ceiling at a level higher than human height, to the front and side walls, there were crossbeams (bast kashta) and a bench [ear (osh) puççi or kămak sakki] cut into the stoves. Under the ear of the jubilee is the cellar "Tăpsakai" - a symbol of the earth, harvest and fertility, responsible for the growth and maturation of cereals, seeds (vărlăkh) were buried there. From Ush yupi, the hut was conditionally divided into parts: front (tĕpel-kitchen) and back (alăk kukri), left (male) and right (female) halves. Usha Yubi is the messenger of God, the connection with God, the conductor of the souls of the dead. Through it, the Chuvash connect with their spirits of dead ancestors and with the gods, through it passes the connection between all the worlds - the upper, middle, lower. According to the Chuvash mythological legends, the dwelling was a miniature model of the universe. Usha yubi symbolized the axis of the world (tĕnche tĕnĕlĕ), according to legend, Tĕncheri Tură (Creator of the universe) stuck 5 pillars between heaven and earth to separate the upper and middle worlds. The first 4 pillars were installed along the edges of the earth and the Ulypy giants held it with their backs, and the main fifth central golden pillar Usha yubi (in. Ulchebi, Tĕp yuba) was the main one, connecting all three worlds and holding "kăvak huppi" - "blue cover" in the form of a tukhya (dome), its top can be seen every morning, ear vĕşĕ - Venus. Near him, prayers were uttered for well-being in the house. During prayers, as well as during night vigils, a lit candle was attached to Usha near the body of the deceased, which symbolized the star of the morning dawn of Usha, the fire of the candle was maintained until dawn. A clean towel was hung on the Usha yubi (sometimes tied in the middle) during the funeral (it was believed that the soul of the deceased was wiped off when leaving the house), the newlywed during the wedding ceremony hung a towel in honor of Pirĕshti.

Tĕp yuba - this pillar was located in the corner of the front part of the garden (sometimes the outermost pillar of the gate) from the side of the street, symbolized one of the pillars of the earth and sky, had the same function as Usha yubi, during çimek all the sacrificial food collected in cast irons, the heirs of the clan carried out and poured out, poured to this pillar, served as an altar.

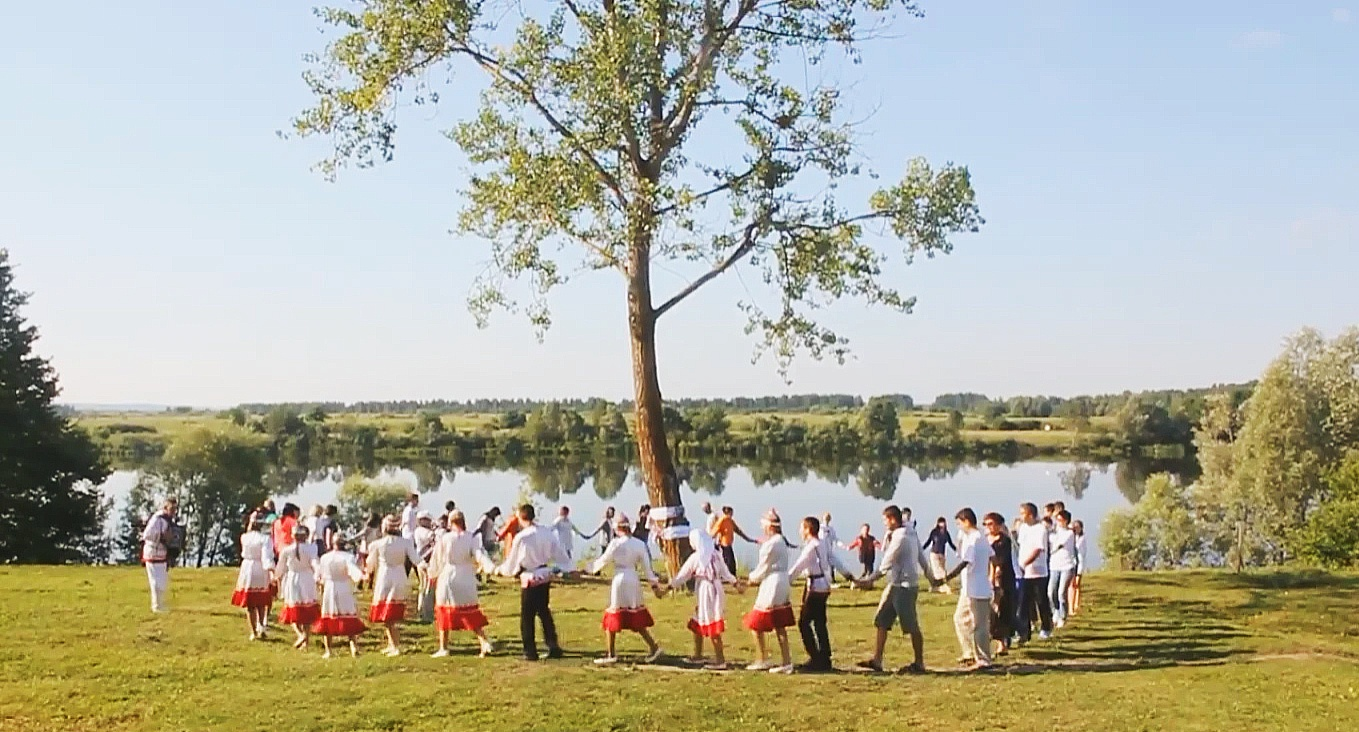
Chuvash ritual round dance around the sacred tree Kеrеmеt

Yerekh Kĕtesĕ - The corner of the erech, for the Chuvash, the corners are considered holy, since the ocean erodes the shores of the earth, and when the waters reach the center, the end of the world will come, in connection with this, the Chuvash have always strongly protected the corners, even on embroideries, like a talisman. Therefore, in the front corner of the house, a basket of Erekhom (a doll of the spirit of ancestors) was placed, which was supposed to protect the clan, home and family. After baptism, they were replaced with icons.

== World structure ==
Chuvash paganism is characterized by a multi-tiered view of the world. The world consisted of three parts and seven layers: a three-layer upper world, one-layer our world and a three-layer lower world. In the ancient beliefs of the Chuvashs, the Earth was square in shape on 4 cardinal points (north, south, west, east), the world ocean surrounded it from all sides, the earth was covered with an eggshell dome in the form of Tukhya (Chuvash headdress), another group of Chuvashs had the Earth covered with a tent (yurt) and it had 8 corners. In the center of the earth was the axis of the world - God's staff, the golden central pillar which was thrust by the god "Măn Tură (Aslă Aşa)" himself, he did this in order to separate heaven and earth when he created the world in his forge. On the four sides, along the edges of the earthly square, the firmament was supported by four pillars: silver, bronze, copper and iron. In every corner stood guard over the earth and human life, wonderful heroes who held the pillars with their powerful armor. On the tops of these pillars there were nests, in them there were three eggs, on the eggs - ducks. After that, the central pillar blossomed into a tree, took root in the ground and the branches rested in the sky. In the center of the earth was the world mountain Aramazi, on its top the age-old Yuman oak grows with roots connecting the lower world and branches of the upper worlds, this is a symbol of the Chuvash family - the tree of ancestors, connecting dead and living descendants. The Chuvashs believed that they lived in the center of the world on Mount Aramazi, but because of the great flood they were forced to descend along the rainbow to the earth, here they created their temples in this image and called it Yrsamai - Miracle, Holy Good, Paradise. Now every Chuvash plant a tree of his ancestors and pray to him.

=== Beliefs ===
The supreme god Tĕncheri Tură (Aslă Aşa) was in the uppermost world. He ruled the universe. Metal lightning and thunder, controlled rain. When a person died, his soul went up a narrow bridge (shinawat), passing to a rainbow, and ascended to the upper world. And if he was sinful, then, without passing through the narrow bridge (shinavat), the human soul fell into a ravine into the lower world (tamăk). They believed that the shores of the earth were washed by the oceans, raging waves constantly destroy the shores. Therefore, the Chuvash were convinced that "When the edge of the earth reaches the center of the earth where the Chuvash live, the end of the world will come, after which God will forge a new world." Also, by the end of the world, people will decrease in height, they used to say the Chuvash were giants. As a talisman against the end of the world, they embroidered amulets on clothes, carved them on utensils. They transmitted their legends and myths orally, through songs.

== World creation ==
According to mythopoetic songs, the world was created by two ducks "Chămka kăvakal" (Podiceps cristatus) who dived into the oceans and got silt from the bottom, so a floating nest was built by one duck, and the second duck hid the earth in its beak, which it vomited up as a result, mountains and hills appeared from it. The world was created on Monday, the earth was created on Tuesday, man was molded on Wednesday, Thursday is a sacred day. The first giant man was molded by Tură from clay, the water became his blood, and the wind became his breath, the fire strengthened his bones and his name was Atăm (in the translation of Clay), the second man in his own image was blinded by Yĕrĕh himself, since he was sad, but so as he had no experience in the creation of man, he made a mistake and blinded a crooked figure from which the first woman Yăva (translated as Nest) appeared. Since then, the Chuvash have called ducks Kăvakal - which means "Blue hand" (heavenly). The symbol of other peoples is an amulet "hamsa" (Arabic: خمسة, romanized: khamsa).

The division of the world:

Aşa and Ama - two elements and the progenitor of everything in the world, translated as father and mother, male and female, masculine and feminine.

AŞA [azya] (kuk aşey, aslaşi) a.k.a. Tĕnçeri Tură (Creator of the Universe, Heaven) - in the pre-Christian beliefs of the Chuvash, the progenitor of all things, the spouse of Ama, the supreme god (God of Heaven). The image has a pronounced archaic character. Once he ascended to heaven with a terrible roar and remained there. In the hierarchy of the gods and their subordination, it occupies the first place. In the power of Aşa are çiçĕm (lightning) and tankăra (thunder). The first makes it shine and illuminate the earth, the second makes it rattle (knock). In his intentions, he acts as the patron and protector of Ama (Goddess of the Earth), all noble creatures and a person who lives with kind and pure thoughts. At the same time, he also has a militancy. In an effort to destroy the demon, Aşa can also strike a sinless person, because. the first in a thunderstorm always tries to be close to the Good. Everything that exists on earth is divided into two parts: one half belongs to Ama, the other to Aşa (Aşa vut - fire A., Aşa shyv - water A., etc.).

AMA (kuk amai) - in Chuvash mythology, it acts as the mother of all things as the Turkic Umai. The cult of Ama is similar to the ideas of many ancient religions. The image is not singled out in tangible, concrete details. Its location in one version is a huge space; existed forever. In the other, she was on the ground, next to her was Aşa. Ama is renounced from any actions, Aşa, on the contrary, rises up with noise and roar during the creation of the world [The sky breaks away from the Earth (It takes with it everything that is on earth: water, fire, stones, etc.]. After the separation of Aşa from Ama, the axis of the world (Aşa yupi) is built - the reproductive organ of Aşa and support pillars at 4 corners of a square and flat earth. Mothers of all creatures (females) were formed from Ama, even in nature (Shyv amăshĕ - the mother of Water, Vut amăshĕ - the mother of Fire, Ana amăshĕ - the mother of Arable land), the supreme gods themselves (Tură amăshĕ - the mother of Tură, Pÿlĕh amăshĕ - the mother of Pÿlĕh) and evil spirits.

Tĕnçeri Tură made any creation from clay. Therefore, both man and other living beings are based on clay. Sat, they say, somehow, Tĕnçeri Tură on the bank of a large river. He saw a heap of sticky clay. He pinched off a piece and began to sculpt some form. He turned out to be a wonderful human (man). Tura created man in the image of the world itself. The material from which the world is created is the earth. Human blood is water, hair is grass, bones are stones, body is earth. Yĕrĕh saw his creation and decided to create the same. But no matter how hard he tried, he managed to create only a woman. Tĕnçeri Tură created a dog (jytă) and ordered it to guard the first man. And Yĕrĕh created a cat. A person consists of several elements: çun, tăn, üt, yun (soul, consciousness, flesh, blood). God blew the first breath into a person - that's why it is called Vĕre (Aura) - a breath in translation.

Tĕnçeri Tură decided to create an amazing animal. He took the best clay in his hands and worked on his creation for three days and three nights. By dawn, he had a kind, beautiful cow. With gentle and good treatment, she gave delicious milk in large quantities. God was very pleased with his creation. He shared his joy with brother Yĕrĕh. Yĕreh was inspired by this work by Tĕnçeri Tură when he saw a cow. He decided that he could do the same! Unfortunately, no matter what he did, he still failed. He already put the cow in front of him: he blinded the head, and the horns, and the body, and the udder ... But instead of “muuuuuk”, she said “meeek”, and when Yĕrĕkh wanted to stroke his “cow”, she began to butt him, so the Goat appeared ... People have nicknamed this animal: “Cow Yĕrĕha”.

Tĕnçeri Tură had a lot of ideas, so next time he decided to create an extremely cute, kind, but very useful animal. For five days and nights he worked on it, and by dawn he had a lamb. She gave wool, milk, brought a large offspring, and was also distinguished by very tasty meat. Yĕrĕhu also liked this animal very much. He also wanted to do something similar. And the body is small, and the hooves are beautiful, and the tail is curly ... He tried, tried, but his animal turned out bald all the time. He couldn't make it beautiful. It turned out to be a pretty cute animal: a pig. She grunted sweetly when Yĕrĕh stroked the pig. But at some point, the pig bit off Yĕrĕhu's finger and ate it. She, it turns out, eats meat.

Therefore, Chuvash people do not use goat and pig meat in traditional prayers, in remembrance of the dead and in other important ceremonies.

Vegetation was created in the same way. Tĕnçeri Tură created trees with tasty and healthy fruits, and Yĕrĕkh with bitter and poisonous ones. Tĕnçeri Tură created beautiful trees. He was the first to create the "Golden Poplar" and said: various magical seeds will ripen on it, which, with the help of the wind, will scatter around the world and sprout where they fall. They will give many good plants and fruits. The seeds ripened and scattered around the world. They sprouted with the most beautiful flowers and herbs, the most beautiful shrubs and trees, amazing and delicious fruits ripened on them, they were fragrant with the most delicious aromas. Since then, the Chuvash have called all Turks the word "tĕrĕk - poplar" (that is, those praying, worshiping the poplar). According to the etymology of the words tĕrĕk (tÿrĕk) means straight (tree). Yĕrĕh also wanted to follow his brother's example and contribute to the universe. Tura at that time created Rowan. Yĕrĕh began to spy on his father. He looks, and the flowers are white, and the leaves are beautiful, and the berries are red. He wanted to do the same! He turns and turns, but the trees don't turn out as beautiful as his father's. It looks like it, but the flowers do not smell so delicious, the trunk is not so powerful and tall, the leaves stick together, and the berries are bitter-bitter... Since then, the herbs and trees created by Yĕrĕh, unfortunately, have only thorns and bad properties. They do not have fruits, and if they do, they are poisonous. So, according to the ideas of the Chuvash, good trees and bad trees appeared.

== Holidays ==
Moon Kun - "Great day" (creation of the world according to Chuvash beliefs)

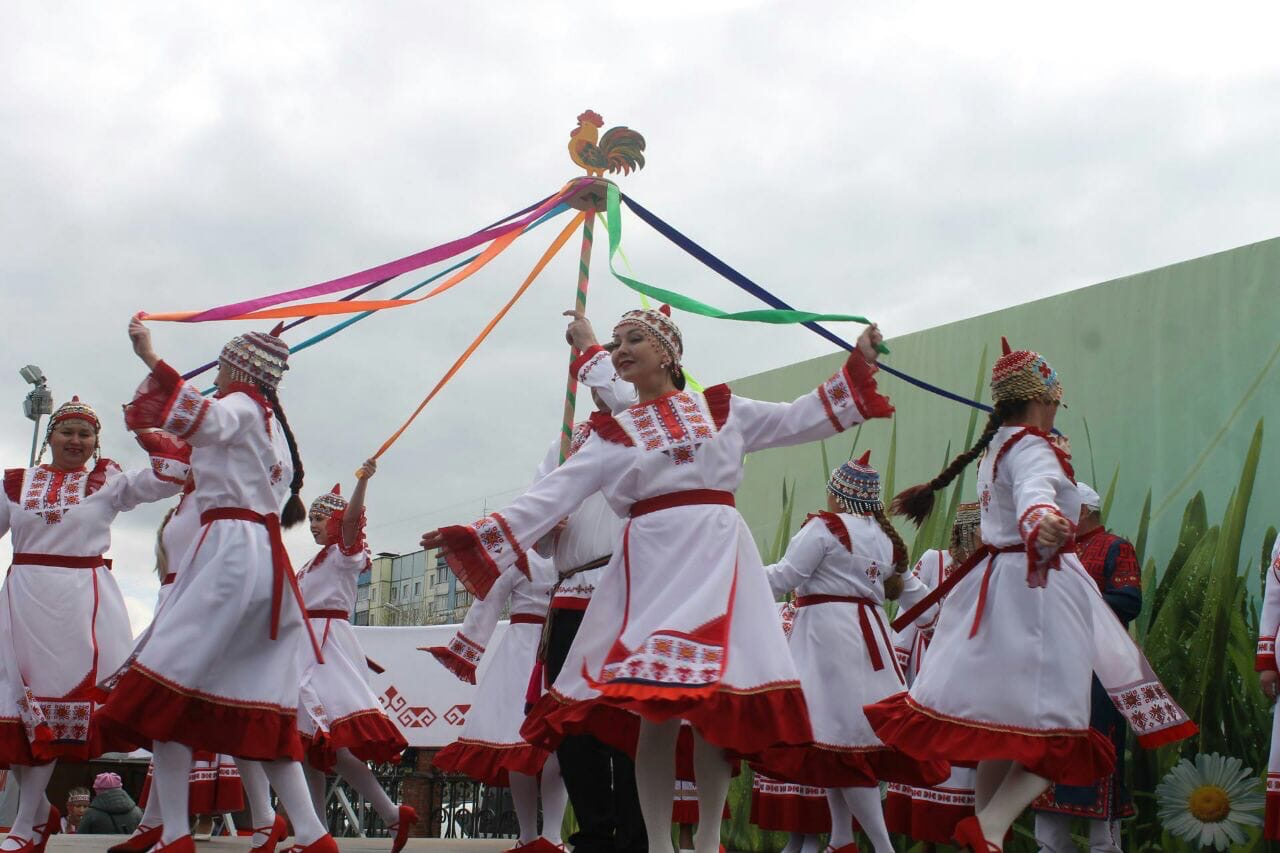
Chuvash Akatui Holiday

Aka Tuy - "Sowing wedding" (the wedding of heaven and earth, the plow represents intercourse)

Vyrma - Harvest. It was a tense and difficult, but at the same time a very responsible period in the annual labor cycle of a farmer. Bread is the crown of all peasant labor.

Avon (Avăn) is a polysemantic word. This is a threshing. This holiday was accompanied by many obligatory rituals due to the great importance of grinding bread. It was especially pleasant, solemn for the peasants. Threshing is just as exciting as harvesting.

Chuk - is a sacrifice

Uchuk - the common prayer of the Chuvash people (uy-khir chukĕ - sacrifice in the field)

Chukleme is a celebration of the consecration of the offering of a new harvest to the spirits of nature, dead ancestors, accompanied by a treat for all relatives. In late autumn, after the end of threshing, the Chuvash peasants carefully sorted and divided the grain: the best - for seeds, the worst - for fodder, and this for flour.

Sora chyuge (Săra çükĕ) - prayers with beer, beer is sacrificed to the spirits. At this festivities, a ladle of beer is sacrificed to the following personalities: Tĕncheri turra, tură amăshĕpe ashshĕne, sĕvere vyrtakan yrra, hĕvel ashshĕpe amăshne, çil ashshĕpe amăshne, pylak parana, pikhampara, hĕrlĕ çyra...

Ker Sori (Kĕr sări) - "Autumn beer" is a rite of worship and autumn thanksgiving for the new harvest to the spirits of ancestors. It was performed in late October - early November with a waning moon. Be sure to temper a rooster or chicken by brewing beer. The participants of the holiday walked around the houses of all relatives in turn, treated them to beer and tasted the beer of the owners. Similar to the German Oktoberfest. Some Chuvash people call him Avdan Sori (Avtan sări). Autumn commemoration of the dead among the unbaptized Chuvash. After completion of field work and threshing, part of the September harvest was organized on the night of the first Friday after the full moon.

Khyor Sori (Hĕr sări) - girl's beer, girl's holiday, winter youth holiday. This is an echo of the rites of initiation - the transition of girls into the girlish age group - associated with rites associated with the winter solstice; 15-20 girls from the street gathered for the performance, one of them was chosen as the head, others as the treasurer to collect money. The feast was held in a hut kept for a fee or on other terms. Girls brought flour, malt, grain, hops, oil and other products, brought beer, prepared ritual food. If the beer was prepared in advance by each girl separately, the participants poured their shares into a common keg (just a couple of buckets). The holiday began with a prayer. The girls led the festival and showed their skills in running and brewing beer. The girls' parents, fellow villagers, and boys were visiting. The girls entertained them, singing and dancing to the playing of musical instruments. They were accompanied by several married men so as not to be offended. It was practically a demonstration by the girls that they were ready to get married and attract a future husband.

Surkhuri - in Chuvash coincided with Christmas, is considered the Chuvash holiday of the winter solstice. Another ethnographic group of the Chuvashs called this holiday "Šuşi" - "Dawn", since the morning star in their dialect is "Šuşămpuş" - the Head of the dawn.

Syovarni (Şăvarni, Şu erni) is a holiday of spring awakening, Maslenitsa.

Syul Puze (Şul Puşĕ) — New Year, the holiday of the beginning of the year, is celebrated on March 20–21 on the day of the spring equinox. The Chuvash counted the year by summer (çulla). Navruz coincided with the Muslim holiday, so the Chuvash used to call March "narăs uyăhĕ", but due to some events, the names of the months were changed. Corresponding to the Roman first month of the year, named after Mars, the god of agriculture and cattle breeding, Martius - March.

Seren (Seren) is a spring holiday of the lower Chuvash, dedicated to the expulsion of evil spirits from the village. And the very name of the holiday means “exile”. Seren was held on the eve of the great day (mun kun), and in some places before the summer commemoration of dead ancestors - on the eve of Simek.

Sinze (Şinşe) is a traditional pre-Christian rite dedicated to the time of the summer solstice.

Nime - charity, collective assistance arranged by fellow villagers in laborious and tedious work. Help each other build houses, bridges to the village, a fence to the cemetery, a road to the village. All this for free, everyone brought what he had, women cooked food for the hard workers in huge boilers.

Simek (Şimĕk) - commemoration of all the dead relatives, people take a bath in the morning, dress in clean white clothes and go to the cemetery, where they call the souls of their dead relatives to the family home for a meal, where they put food (cakes, beer) in a vat and they take it out to the "usha yupi" (sometimes tyop yuba) which stands in the corner of the garden, all other treats (leftover food) cannot be removed from the table until the next morning.

Rites

AMA Kurgi - one of the rituals of the funeral rite, is held in honor of the soul of a woman leaving for the other world, and therefore the woman treats the audience with beer. According to the beliefs of the Chuvash, during the ceremony, the struggle between Good and Evil takes place in the microcosm, in order to represent the image in the macrocosm. Ama (Goddess) is the mother earth herself, she was given the body of the dead in her womb of the earth, and the soul went to heaven to Aça (Tĕncheri Tură).

Yuba - a grave monument of the Chuvash in the form of a wooden pillar, on the graves of the dead. It was installed with the root part towards the sky, since the Chuvash considered the earth to be a reflection of the sky (kĕske), so dead souls fall back to heaven from where they were lowered down. Yuba was an anthropomorphic pillar, on the grave of a man it was made of oak, on the grave of a woman it was made of linden. Men's tombstones were dressed in a hat and cap. Women's tombstones differed depending on the age of the buried (a surpan, tutor, masmak headdress was tied on Yuba of older women). Symbolizing the image of an ancestor-intermediary between Tură and man, Yuba personified a model of the world (as the sun - a lit candle or a coin or a piece of metal on top). Dimples for candles (from one to five) in the upper part of the Jup, being transformed, later began to be understood as a place for "heavenly water", "water for birds", etc. After a certain time, next to the wooden tombstones, a permanent epitaph was placed on the grave of a man - made of stone with a flat top, a woman - made of stone with a rounded top. Usually this was done in a special month called Yuba (October) dedicated to the ancestors. The anthropomorphic pillar Yuba, which was laid on the bed in the clothes of the deceased, after a home commemoration with a plentiful meal, was taken to the cemetery with dancing, singing and playing musical instruments, while observing all the elements of the funeral rite. Participants in the ritual at the gates of the deceased arranged the bridge of Shinavi (Shinavat), after a small fire was kindled from straw, chips and sawdust left over from the cleaning and processing of the Yuba wooden pillar, a cult of worship of fire and a dance ceremony were performed, they led a round dance around the fire, played the harmonica and sang ritual songs. After that, the Yuba pillar on long white towels was carried exclusively by men in the cemetery (Masar). Having installed a tombstone, they lit a candle on it and, accompanied by music, arranged a feast, using one-legged tables and benches. The ritual of Yuba is characterized by sitting in the night before sunrise with lit candles.

Kěbe - It was believed that winter colds begin from this time. People began to dress warmer, just as the earth dressed in snow. On this day, all relatives gathered at one of the relatives, performed rituals related to preparation for winter. Kĕbe - placenta (afterbirth) shirt of a newborn baby. After the birth of the child, they sacrificed a white ram, to the god Кеbе. Kebe - god distributor of fates.

Pănçă - a red dot on the forehead that was drawn to babies from the evil eye. Especially on the holiday of Acha Yashki (Soup for the Baby), which was celebrated when the child had the first tooth. Since all the people who came to the celebration could jinx the child. Also in the future, women sewed in the form of a central coin on their headdresses (Tuhya, Hushpu, Masmak).

== Ritual games ==
Syumor potty (Şumăr pătti) - Rain porridge, in some unbaptized villages it is still carried out, each street (kassi) has its own designated place, prayer porridge is cooked there, children collect food from each house, who gives cereals, who gives eggs, who milk. The ceremony is performed during dry times to bring rain. While adults are preparing food, young people run around the village with buckets and pour water on each other (shyvpa vylyany), even adult passers-by, no one is offended by this, otherwise they will cause sin on themselves. There are also village-wide and even bush "humor pottas" (several villages) if there are very severe droughts.

Por Yany (Păr Yani) - Seeing off the ice, with the advent of spring, the male population begins to help the river open up from the ice, they cut through ice floes with axes, with cuttings and in other ways and push the ice, a very dangerous occupation where women and children are not allowed, they watch from the side and sing, it tests male courage and courage, there are times when people fall into icy water, but they prepare rescue ropes in advance. After that, fires of straw and firewood are made on the ice floes, and they sing a song: "Păr kayat, păr kayat, părpa pĕrle hĕl kayat!" (Ice leaves and with it winter).

Ulah (Ulăh) - Unity, at this time the girls found their future husbands, and the grooms the bride. Guys and girls gather in the evenings in one of the houses, the girls take a spindle or embroidery with them, and some of the guys weave bast shoes, who take a violin, harp with them. They spin, they sing, they all play together. Riddles are made, fairy tales are told, boys meet girls.

Oyăha lăpăr şini - Everyone, except for two, stand in a circle; of the rest, one depicts the moon and remains in the middle of the circle, the other - "Lăpăr" - remains outside the circle. The purpose of lăpăr is to catch oyăh, so he wants to get into the circle, but they try not to let him in; if he enters, then oyăkh rather runs out of the circle - he is released freely. Lăpăr is now striving for the circle, but again they are trying not to let him in. The game sometimes drags on for a long time: the lăpăr’u fails to catch the oyăh. As soon as the lăpăr catches oyăh, then “oyăha çiyaççĕ”, i.e. oyăh lies down on the ground and plugs his ears; but he is not allowed to do this: all the players gather to him and shout directly into his ears, at the top of their lungs.

== Traditional calendar ==
The months of the Chuvash were interconnected with mythological ideas, rituals and the agricultural way of life. The modern form of the sequence of months and some of their names are slightly changed from its original form, due to the influence of neighboring cultures of Muslims and Christians.

1. Kărlach (January) - the month of cold weather
2. Narăs (February) - the month of Navruz
3. Push (March) - empty month, free time, matchmaking month
4. Aka (April) - the month dedicated to the sowing season, during this period, the virgin land is opened with a plow, after hibernation (plowing and sowing)
5. Syu (May) - the month of summer, dedicated to the goddess of the earth and fertility Ama (Umai)
6. Sĕrtme (June) - the month of steam, steam arable land.
7. Ută (July) - the month of haymaking
8. Surla (August) - sickle month, harvest
9. Avăn (September) - month of threshing
10. Yupa (October) - the month of commemoration, literally the month of the ritual pillar (axis of the world), which connects all three worlds, the dead, the gods and ours
11. Chuk (November) - the month of sacrifices, gratitude to God, gifts of spirits, ancestors, for a good harvest next year
12. Rashtav (December) - the month of Christmas

Instead of "ear uyăhĕ" (month of Venus) - January (tur.oҗak), the Tatar "kărlach" (kyrlach) appeared, and instead of "nartukhan" - December, the Orthodox "rashtav" (Christmas) appeared, but the word "nartăvan" also did not is primary and was previously borrowed from the Muslim "nardugan", there is a dialect variant "khurakaç" uyăhĕ - December. The month "narăs" from the Muslim "navruz" also belongs there. There is also a dialectal difference in the months: xĕr uyăhĕ - June (maiden month), çăvarni uyăhĕ - March (lit. the month of carnival), çĕrtme uyăhĕ - June–July (literally the month of couple), măn kărlachă - December (1st cold month of the year), kĕçĕn kărlachă - January (the 2nd cold month of a 13-month year), yĕtem uăhĕ - September (threshing floor, current), nurăs uyăhĕ - the month of March (navrus), çeçke uyăhĕ - May (the month of flowers).

== See also ==
- Chuvash National Congress

== Bibliography ==
- Vovina, Olessia (2000). In Search of the National Idea: Cultural Revival and Traditional Religiosity in the Chuvash Republic (PDF). Seton Hall University, 2000. The National Council for Eurasian and East European Research. Archived from the original (PDF) on 2022-12-14.
- Filatov, Sergei; Shchipkov, Aleksandr (1995). "Religious Developments among the Volga Nations as a Model for the Russian Federation" (PDF). Religion, State & Society. 23 (3): 239–243. doi:10.1080/09637499508431705.
- Valentin Stetsyuk. Introduction to the Study of Prehistoric Ethnogenic Processes in Eastern Europe and Asia, The Turkic Tribe Bulgar in Eastern Europe. Lviv, Ukraine.
- Schnirelman, Victor (2002). ""Christians! Go home": A Revival of Neo-Paganism between the Baltic Sea and Transcaucasia" (PDF). Journal of Contemporary Religion. 17 (2). Archived from the original (PDF) on 2013-08-22.
- Marc Ira Hooks. The Chuvash People - An Ethnographic Study & Missiological Strategy Analysis. Engage Russia.
- Nikitina, Erbina (28 December 2019). "Chuvash Religion As A Key Component Of Ethnic Mentality" (PDF). The European Proceedings of Social & Behavioural Sciences: 2466–2472. doi:10.15405/epsbs.2019.12.04.330.
