= Russian annexation of Chuvashia =

Incorporation of Chuvashia into Russia in 1551

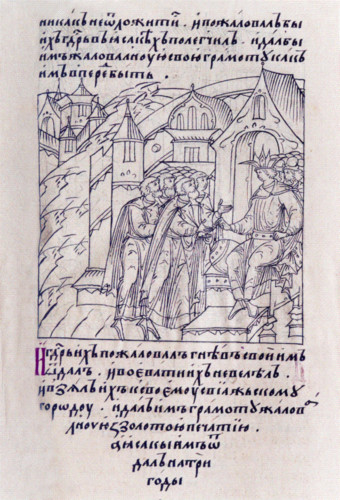
Miniature from the "History of the Kazan Kingdom" Appeal of the Chuvash and mountain Mari to Shah Ali and the Russian voivodes (1551)

The entry of Chuvashia into the Russian state was an event in the history of the Chuvash people that occurred in 1551, when the Chuvash (as well as the mountain Mari) of the mountain side became a subject of the Russian state.

== Background ==
Numerous Russian campaigns against Kazan were accompanied by the plunder of the population along the way.

In September 1546, 4 Kazan princes and 76 other Kazan citizens defected to the side of Moscow. On December 6 of the same year, the mountain cheremis "Tugai with two comrades" ("Mountain Cheremis centurion Atachik with comrades", according to the "Discharge Book") beat the forehead for loyalty to Ivan the Terrible and asked to send an army. The result was a campaign of the Russian voivodes to the mouth of the Sviyaga river, during which "one hundred people of cheremisa" were captured.

After the construction of Sviyazhsk, the presence of Russian troops on the Mountain side became permanent, by which time it became clear that Kazan was unable to defend this territory. "The mountain people, seeing that the city of the Orthodox tsar had become in their land, and began to come to the tsar and the voivodes and beat them with their brows, so that their sovereign would grant them, gave up their anger, but would have ordered them to be at the Sviyazhsk city and did not order them to fight.

In Chuvashia, the fortresses of Cheboksary, Alatyr, Tsivilsk, and Yadrin were built, which soon became trade and craft centers.

In the 2nd half of the XVI-XVII centuries, the southern and south—western parts of Chuvashia were settled, abandoned in the XIV-early XV centuries due to the robber attacks of the Nogais. The center of consolidation and growth of the Chuvash nation was the right-bank settlement area.

During the peace negotiations in the summer of 1551 between Ivan the Terrible and the "whole Land of Kazan" (a class-representative body in which representatives of the Chuvash and Mari participated), the tsar refused to return the Mountain side, arguing that he " took a saber before their petition."

== Results ==
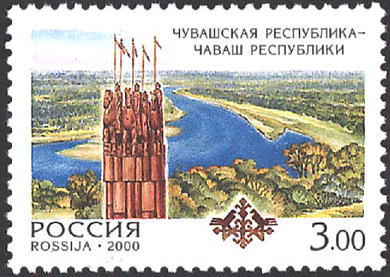
Equestrian monumental and decorative composition " The campaign of the Chuvash delegation to Moscow with a petition for voluntary entry into the Moscow state.

In March 1552, the Kazan people overthrew Shah Ali, which was perceived by Moscow as a break in the peace, and preparations for new military operations began. At the beginning of April, the Sviyazhsk voivodes reported that " ... the mountain people are worried, many are exiled from Kazan, but they have little faith in all the truth, and there is great disobedience in them..."

Already in the next "letter" (letter) of the Sviyazhsk voivodes, they already reported that " ... everything was changed by the mountain people, but they folded with Kazan and came to the Sviyazhsk city…"

In December 1552, the Chuvash and Cheremis killed many Russian messengers, merchants, and people who were escorting government-issued carts on the road from Sviyazhsk to Vasilsursk. The Russian government, having received a report of hostile actions, responded with terror. 74 people of Civil Chuvash were brought to Sviyazhsk; all of them were hanged, and their property was given to informers. The war, which broke out with renewed vigor in 1553, lasted until 1557, and the Chuvash took an active part in it.

As a result of the annexation, the Chuvash lost their own feudal and urban strata, which caused the slow development of non-village culture. If in the Kazan Khanate the Chuvash had their own representation in the authorities, then in Russia it was not until the October Revolution. Like other peoples of the former Kazan Khanate, the Chuvash were forbidden to engage in blacksmithing and silver crafts. On the positive side the Chuvash people, like other peoples of the former Kazan Khanate, did not fall under serfdom.

After the capture of Kazan in 1552 and the suppression of the anti-Moscow uprising of 1552–1557, the Chuvash people who lived on the Lugovaya Side also became subjects of Moscow. The Medieval historian V. D. Dimitriev believed that by becoming part of Russia, the Chuvash People got rid of the Islamic-Tatar assimilation and preserved themselves as a nation:

"In the Kazan Khanate, almost half of the left-bank Chuvash as well as "thin Bulgarians" went to the Tatars. If the existence of the Kazan Khanate and the Islamization of the Chuvash continued, all of them would have became a Tatar, disappeared as an ethnic group. Even as part of Russia, the left-bank Chuvash continued to settle (many left-bank Chuvash moved to the Lower Zakamye and Bashkiria), but the right-bank Chuvash and a significant part of the Prikazan and Zakazan Chuvash of the Chuvash (Zyurey) road remained as an ethnic group and numerically increased by about 10 times over 450 years".

== See also ==
- Chuvash National Movement

== Literature ==
- Димитриев В. Д. Вхождение Чувашии в состав Русского государства // Электронная Чувашская энциклопедия = Чувашская энциклопедия : в 4 т. / Гл. ред. В. С. Григорьев. — Чебоксары : Чувашское книжн. изд-во, 2006. — Т. 1: А—Е. — 587 с. — ISBN 5-7670-1471-X. // Чувашский государственный институт гуманитарных наук.
