= Radio of Chuvashia =

- Russia
- Broadcast area: Russia

History
- First air date: March 8, 1932

Links
- Website: ГТРК «Чувашия»

Radio of Chuvashia (Russian: Радио Чувашии, Chuvash: Чӑваш радиовӗ) is a Chuvash radio station based in Cheboksary, broadcasting in many Chuvash Republic cities.

Director Elena Izhendeeva.

== Shareholders structure ==
- All-Russia State Television and Radio Broadcasting Company

== See also ==
- Chuvash National Movement
- Chuvash national radio
