= Chuvash numerals =

Ancient Turkic numeral system

Chuvash numerals.

Chuvash numerals is an ancient numeral system from the Old Turkic script the Chuvash people used. (Modern Chuvash use Hindu-Arabic numerals.)

Those numerals originate from finger numeration. They look like Roman numerals, but larger numerals stay at the right side. It was possible to carve those numerals on wood. In some cases numerals were preserved until the beginning of the 20th century.

Numeral	Chuvash numeral
1	I
5	/
10	X
50	
100	𐠀
500	𐠁
1000	𐳿

== Examples ==
Hindu-Arabic	Chuvash
2	II
4	IIII
6	I/
19	IIII/X
32	IIXXX
47	II/XXXX
