= Nikifor Mran'ka =

Russian writer (1901–1973)

- Born: July 9, 1901; Pileshkasy village, Russia
- Died: February 20, 1973 (aged 71); Chuvashia, USSR
- Occupation: Writer
- Writing career
- Pen name: Nikifor Mran'ka
- Language: Chuvash, Russian

Nikifor Mran'ka (1901 – 1973) (Chuvash and Russian: Никифор Мранька) was a Chuvash writer and playwright. He was born on July 9, 1901, in Pileshkasy, which is a village in the Kozlovsky District, Chuvash Republic. He was part of the USSR Union of Writers in 1939, fought during the Russian Civil War and World War II. He died on February 20, 1973.

== Biography ==
After finishing elementary school in a rural area, he began a course for continuity writers in Moscow.

He participated in the Russian Civil War. After returning from war, he worked as chairman of the village council.

In 1928, his first drama, Elnet was performed at the Chuvash theater in Cheboksary. Later works included Тӳнтерлене хирӗҫ (Against an ambiguity) and "Виҫҫӗшӗ те пӗр калӑпран (All three one test). Nikifor Fyodorovich also worked as the director of a newsreel and as the editor of the regional newspaper.

He served during World War II on the front lines. Afterward, he served as the longtime head of the Department of Propaganda and Propagation of the Kozlovsky District Party Committee. For excellence in literature he was awarded the Certificate of Honour of Presidium of the Supreme Body Chuvash АССР (1971).

== Famous works ==
- Итлӗр! – Listen! (drama, 1930);
- Пӗрремӗш категори – high category (comedy, 1932)
- Элнет – Elnet (drama, 1933);
- Салют – Salute (play, 1936);
- Аван пурӑнатпӑр – Good life (play, 1938);
- Бурлаксем (drama, 1941);
- Ӗмӗр сакки сарлака – Life is life (novel, I- 1959, 1965, 1989; II- 1960, 1967, 1989; III- 1961, 1971, IV- 1971, V- 1980);
- Юратнӑ чӗресем – Loving hearts (1962);

== Memorial ==
Mran'ka Street in Cheboksary is named after him.

== Collections ==
- Чӑваш литературин антологийӗ (Chuvash literature anthology), editing: D. V. Gordeev, J. A. Silem. Cheboksary, 2003. ISBN 5-7670-1279-2 .
- Алексеев В. Н. Век прожить – не поле прейти. Очерк в книге Писатели (Серия Библиотека Президента Чувашии) Cheboksary, 2008, стр.2003 – 213.
