= Chuvash National Broadcasting Company =

Chuvash National Broadcasting Company Чӑваш наци телерадиокомпанийӗ
- Industry: Entertainment
- Founder: Ministry of Information and Mass Communications of the Chuvash Republic
- Headquarters: Cheboksary, Chuvash Republic, Russia
- Area served: Chuvash Republic
- Parent: Ministry of Information and Mass Communications of the Chuvash Republic
- Divisions: Chuvash National Television; Chuvash National Radio; Native Radio
- Website: ntrk21.ru chuvashia.tv

Chuvash National Broadcasting Company (CNBC, Chuvash: Чӑваш наци телерадиокомпанийӗ) is the broadcasting company of the Chuvash Republic. Autonomous Institution "National Broadcasting Company of Chuvashia" was created in December 2011 by the Cabinet of Ministers of the Chuvash Republic.

Founder – Ministry of Information and Mass Communications of the Chuvash Republic. The company includes: "Chuvash National Television", "Chuvash National Radio" and "Native Radio".

== History ==
The need to create a country of national electronic media is ripe for a long time, but the lack of a smart official or political will not render the matter to the practical field.

The desire of the population of the republic and the Chuvash Diaspora in Russian Federation still be heard. In accordance with the Resolution of the Cabinet of Ministers of the Chuvash Republic of 11 December 2008 No. 372 "On the establishment of an autonomous institution of the Chuvash Republic" Chuvash national radio of "Ministry of the Culture, Ethnic Affairs, Information Policy and Archives of the Chuvash Republic" was created Chuvash national radio, which began test broadcasts of 25 April 2009.

On 24 February 2011 CNBC won the competition for the right to air broadcasting on a frequency of 105.0 MHz.

On 28 November 2012 CNBC won federal competition for the right to broadcast on the terrestrial frequency 100,3 FM in Cheboksary. On 16 December 2013 in test mode began to work a new radio – "Naive radio."

== Broadcasting ==
=== The concept of broadcasting ===
Chuvash National Company develops in line with a multicultural society. A professional team is ready to program the Chuvash and Russian languages are broadcast programs about the history, traditions, national identity of other peoples living in Chuvash Republic.

=== Chuvash national radio ===
Radio channel broadcasts in Chuvash and Russian languages on the whole country on 105.0 FM and VHF waves 72.41, the third button, as well as real-time online www.ntrk21.ru. Technical ability to take "Chuvash national radio – Chăvash Yen" have 1,250.5 thousand. Man in the Chuvash Republic, as well as residents of neighboring republics and regions. The radio channel is actively replenishes audiarhiv, is recording radio shows and premiere performances. National Radio produces more than 50 programs every month.

=== Chuvash National Television ===
Chuvash National Television – the first TV channel in the country, applied "without film" technologies production. The latest equipment provides video production at a high technical level. The mobile station allows you to broadcast important events in the life of the republic in the record and live.

Now the "Chuvash National Broadcasting" produced 27 original programs. Daily news program goes "Republic" in Russian and Chuvash language. Only for 2013 recorded more than 25 concerts and performances. This entire amount of work performed 29 employees television. A total of 75 people working in TV and Radio.

=== Native Radio ===
Broadcasting of the "Native Radio" (Chuvash: "Tăvan Radio") on the frequency 100,3 FM apply to Cheboksary, Novocheboksarsk and surrounding areas. In the broadcast sound songs in Russian and Chuvash language, the best of the "Chuvash National Radio", live broadcasts and other information and entertainment. In the first place – is an interactive radio, a platform for discussion.
