= Chuvash Wikipedia =

Chuvash-language edition of Wikipedia

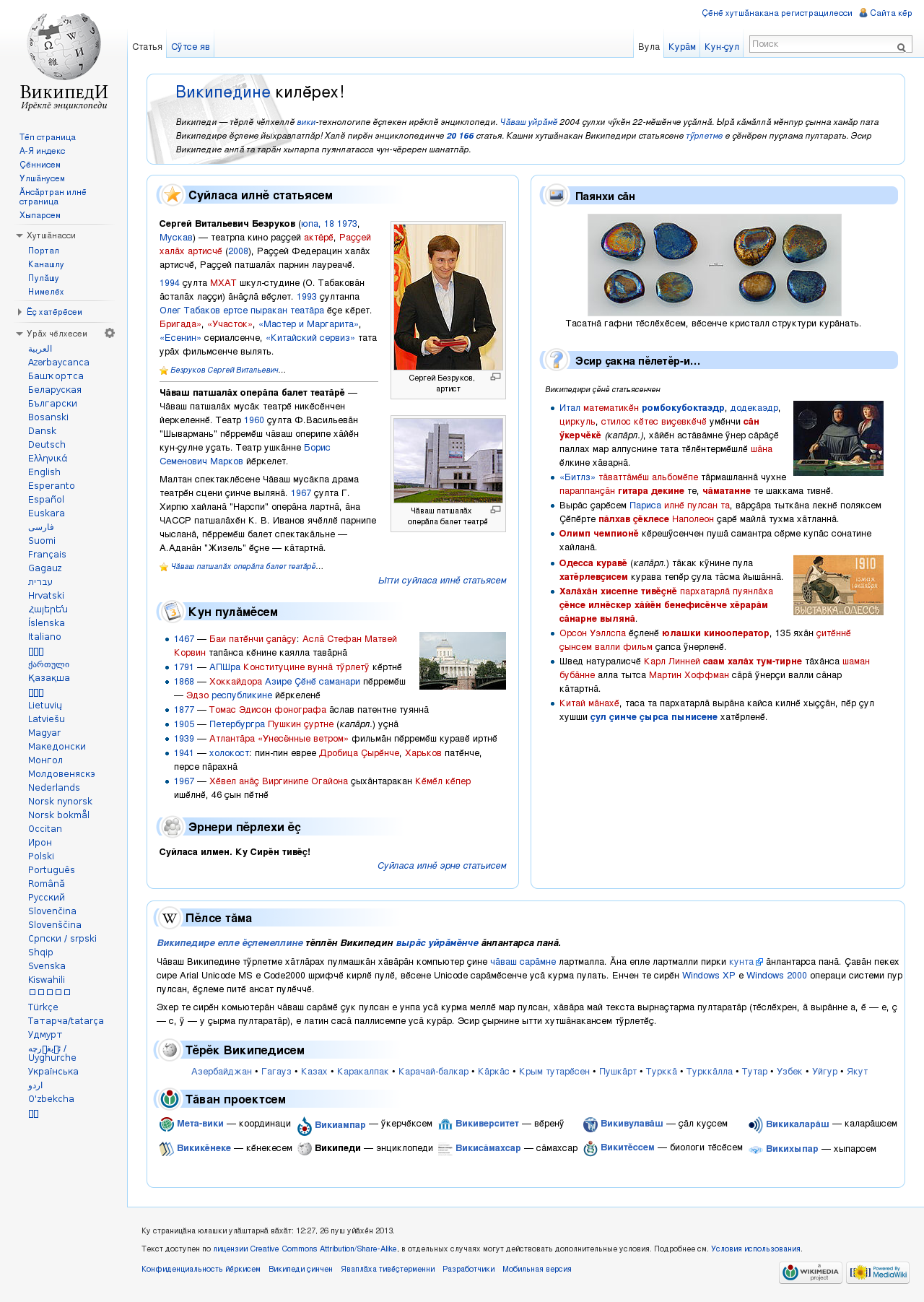
- Screenshot Main page of the Chuvash Wikipedia in December 2013
- Website type: Online encyclopedia
- Available in: Chuvash
- Headquarters: Miami, Florida
- Owner: Wikimedia Foundation
- Website: cv.wikipedia.org
- Commercial: No
- Registration: Optional
- Content license: Creative Commons Attribution/ Share-Alike 4.0 (most text also dual-licensed under GFDL); Media licensing varies

The Chuvash Wikipedia (Chuvash: Чӑваш Википедийӗ, romanized: Čăvaš Vikipedijĕ) is the Chuvash language edition of Wikipedia. It was founded on 22 November 2004. Its 50,000th article was created in October 2022.

== Policies ==
Difficult issues are resolved through the Arbitration Committee, which handles content disputes, blocks users or prohibits certain users from editing articles on certain topics. Administrators (currently 2) are elected through a vote; administrators who have become inactive (i.e. have not used administrative tools, such as "delete" or "block" buttons, at least 25 times in six months) may lose their privileges by an Arbitration Committee decision.

== History ==
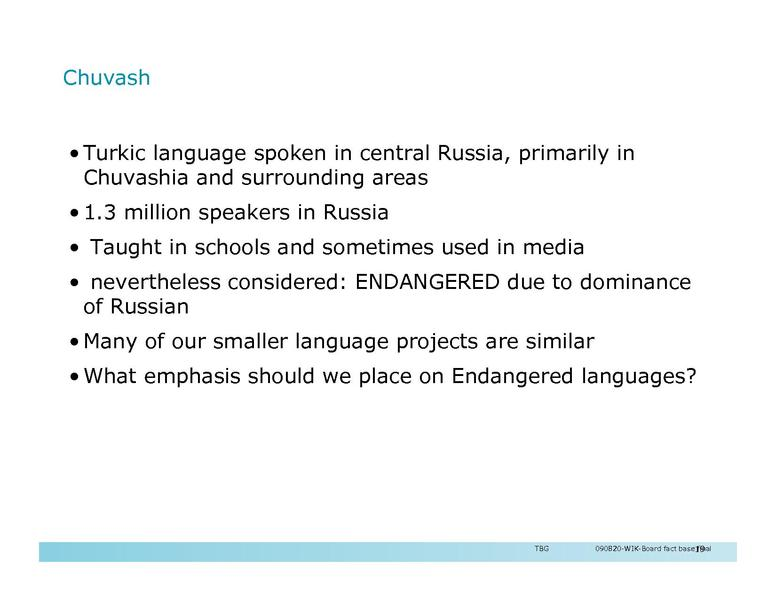
Slide presentation from Jimmy Wales

The Chuvash Wikipedia was created on 22 November 2004. Jimmy Wales used it at Wikimania 2009 as an example of the value of Wikipedia for the languages on the verge of extinction.

=== Timeline ===
- On 16 December 2004, the main page was created.
- On 9 March 2006, the 2,000th article was created.
- On 22 August 2006, the 4,000th article was created.
- On 22 November 2006, the 4,500th article was created.
- In January 2007, the 5,000th article was created.
- In September 2007, the 6,000th article was created.
- On 14 January 2008, the 7,000th article was created.
- On 17 July 2008, the 8,000th article was created.
- On 6 April 2009, the 10,000th article was created.
- On 13 February 2010, the 11,000th article was created.
- On 4 October 2010, the 11,451st article was created.
- On 31 August 2011, the 13,000th article was created.
- On 6 October 2012, the 14,000th article (firm train "Chuvashia") was created.
- On 3 December 2013, the 20,000th article was created.
- On 1 August 2014, the 30,000th article was created.
- On 3 March 2016, the 34,100th article was created.
- On 11 November 2016, the 36,000th article was created.
- On 28 March 2017, the 39,000th article was created.
- On 17 October 2022 the 50,000th article was created.

== Content ==
- Source: Нумай каҫӑллӑ категорисем

== See also ==
- Chuvash National Movement
- ChuvashTet
- Chuvash national radio
- List of Chuvashes
- Chuvash National Congress
