= Shoorcha rebellion =

Uprising in Russian Empire (1842)

Shoorcha rebellion (Akram rebellion, 1842, Chuvash: Шурча вăрçи, Russian: Акрамовское восстание) — uprising against feudal relations Mari, Tatar, Chuvash peasants to protect their property rights in the 19th century.

== History ==
This rebellion was the result of forced administration on social tillage plots of land allotment. This was a clear diminution of the rights of non-Russian peasants. The uprising swept Kozmodemyansk, Sviazhsk, Spassk, Tsivilsk, Cheboksary, Yadrin uyezds of Kazan Governorate and Buinsky Uyezd of Simbirsk Governorate. Attended by 12 thousand people. During the uprising, there were clashes with government troops near the village Mognyal and Akram of Kazan Governorate. It was brutally suppressed.

== Memory ==
Writer Hveder Uyar described Akram uprising in his novel "Teneta"

Painter AM Tagaev-Surban depicted in his work Akram uprising.
