= Chuvash people =

Turkic ethnic group

Chuvash
чӑвашсем çăvaşsem
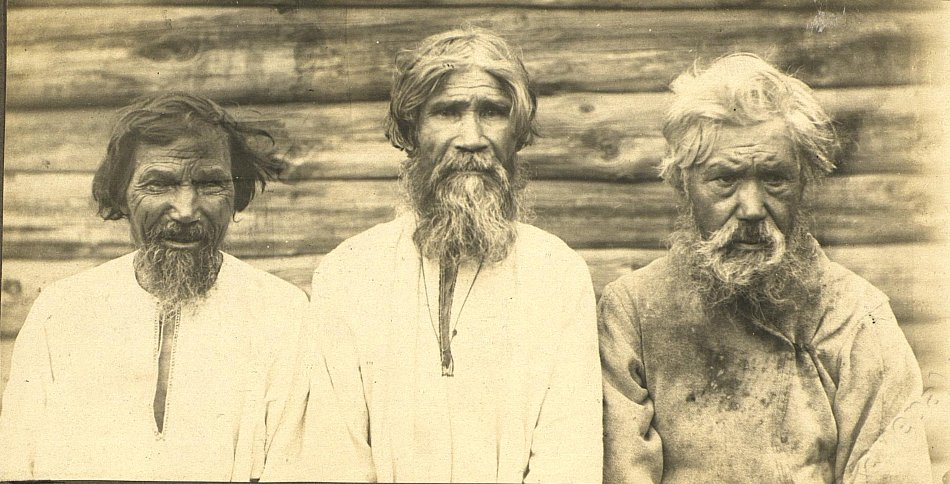
- Old Chuvash men, beginning of the 20th century

Total population
- c. 1.1 million

Regions with significant populations
- Russia (Chuvashia): 1,067,139; 684,930
- Kazakhstan: 22,305
- Ukraine: 10,593
- Uzbekistan: 10,074
- Tajikistan: 3,904
- Turkmenistan: 2,281
- Belarus: 2,242
- Moldova: 1,204

Languages
- Chuvash; Russian

Religion
- Majority: Orthodox Christianity; Minority: Vattisen Yaly (ethnic religion); Sunni Islam

Related ethnic groups
- Volga Tatars, Mari

The Chuvash people (Note: UK: /ˈtʃuːvɑːʃ/ CHOO-vahsh, US: /tʃʊˈvɑːʃ/ chuu-VAHSH; Chuvash: чӑвашсем, romanized: çăvaşsem, pronounced [tɕə̹̆ˈʋaʂsʲɛm]; Russian: чуваши, romanized: čuvaši, pronounced [tɕʊˈvaʂɨ]) are a Turkic ethnic group, a branch of the Oğurs, inhabiting an area stretching from the Idel-Ural region to Siberia.

Most of them live in the Russian republic of Chuvashia and the surrounding area, although Chuvash communities may be found throughout Russia as well as in Central Asia. They speak Chuvash, a Turkic language that diverged from other languages in the family more than a millennium ago. Among the Chuvash believers, the majority are Eastern Orthodox Christians although a minority follow Vattisen Yaly or Sunni Islam.

== Etymology ==
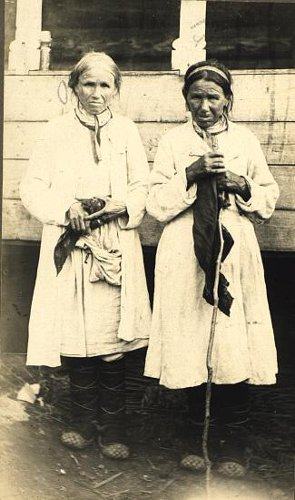
Chuvash women in workaday costumes

There is no universally accepted etymology of the word Chuvash, but there are two theories. One theory suggests that the word Chuvash may be derived from Common Turkic jăvaş ('friendly', 'peaceful'), as opposed to şarmăs ('warlike').

Another theory is that the word is derived from the Tabghach, an early medieval Xianbei clan and founders of the Northern Wei dynasty in China. The Old Turkic name Tabghach (Tuoba in Mandarin) was used by some Inner Asian peoples to refer to China long after this dynasty. Gerard Clauson has shown that through regular sound changes, the clan name Tabghach may have transformed to the ethnonym Chuvash.

== Language ==
Chuvash is a Turkic language spoken in European Russia, primarily in the Chuvash Republic and adjacent areas. It is the only surviving member of the Oghur branch of Turkic languages, one of the two principal branches of the Turkic family.

Although there is no direct evidence, some scholars believe that Chuvash may be descendant from a dialect of Volga Bulgar language while others support the idea that Chuvash is another distinct Oghur Turkic language. Since the surviving literary records for the non-Chuvash members of Oghuric (Bulgar and possibly Khazar) are scant, the exact position of Chuvash within the Oghuric family cannot be determined.

Some scholars suggest Hunnish had strong ties with Bulgar and to modern Chuvash and refer to this extended grouping as separate Hunno-Bulgar languages. However, such speculations are not based on proper linguistic evidence, since the language of the Huns is almost unknown except for a few attested words and personal names. Scholars generally consider Hunnish as unclassifiable.

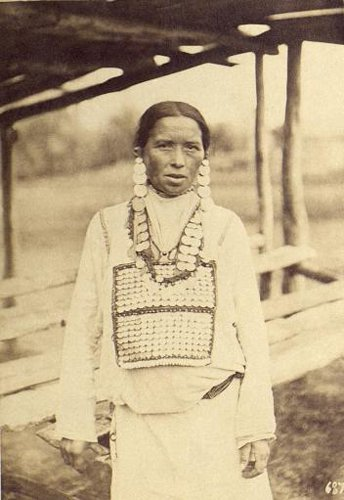
Chuvash woman in traditional attire

Despite grammatical similarity with the rest of Turkic language family, the presence of changes in Chuvash pronunciation (which are hard to reconcile with other members of the Turkic family) has led some scholars to see Chuvash as originating not from Proto-Turkic, but from another proto-language spoken at the time of Proto-Turkic (in which case Chuvash and all the remaining Turkic languages would be part of a larger language family).

The Oghuric branch is distinguished from the rest of the Turkic family (the Common Turkic languages) by two sound changes: r corresponding to Common Turkic z and l corresponding to Common Turkic š. The first scientific fieldwork description of Chuvash, by August Ahlqvist in 1856, allowed researchers to establish its proper affiliation.

Chuvash is so divergent from the main body of Turkic languages that Chuvash was first believed to be a Turkified Finno-Ugric language, or an intermediate branch between Turkic and Mongolic languages. The Russian language and the neighboring Mari and Volga Tatar languages heavily influenced the Chuvash language.

Mongolian, Arabic and Persian also influenced Chuvash. Chuvash language has two to three dialects. Although Chuvash is taught at schools and sometimes used in the media, it is considered endangered by the UNESCO, since Russian dominates in most spheres of life and few children learning the language are likely to become active users.

The subdivision of the Chuvash people are as below:

- Virjal (вирьял, тури, 'upper')
- Anat jenchi (анат енчи, 'mid-lower')
- Anatri (анатри, 'lower')
- Hirti (хирти, 'steppe') (this is a sub-group that is recognized by some researchers)

== History ==
=== Origins ===
There are two rival schools of thought on the origin of the Chuvash people. One is that they originated from a mixing between the Sabir tribes and the Finno-Ugrians. The other is that they are descendant from Volga Bulgars. Throughout history, they have experienced significant infusion and influence, not only from Russian and other Turkic peoples but also from neighboring Uralic tribes with whom they were persistently and mistakenly identified for centuries.

The Sabirs who believed to have come from Siberia, they lived there at least the end of the third millennium BC. They were skilled in warfare, used siege machinery, had a large army (including women) and were boatbuilders. Sabirs led incursions into Transcaucasia in the late-400s/early-500s, but quickly began serving as soldiers and mercenaries during the Byzantine–Sasanian Wars on both sides. Their alliance with the Byzantines laid the basis for the later Khazar-Byzantine alliance.

=== Early history ===
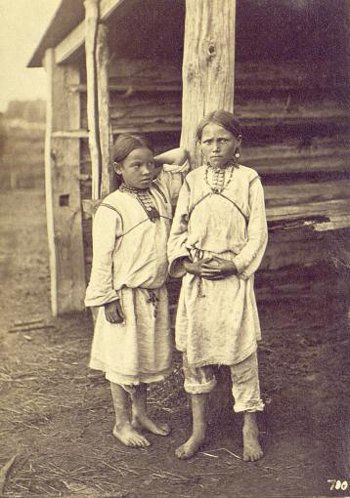
Chuvash girls in traditional costumes

In the early first century AD, the Bulgars (a group possibly related to the Chuvash) started moving west through Zhetysu and the steppes of modern-day Kazakhstan, reaching the North Caucasus in the 2nd to 3rd centuries AD. There they established several states (Old Bulgaria on the Black Sea coast and the Suar Duchy in the area of present-day Dagestan). Old Bulgaria broke up in the second half of the 7th century after a series of successful Khazar invasions. Sabirs, then a tribe within the Khazar Khanate, subsequently undertook a migration to the Volga-Kama region along with other Oghuric tribes, and ultimately founded Volga Bulgaria, which eventually became extremely wealthy: its capital then being the 4th-largest city in the world.

Shortly after that, another state founded by Sabirs in the Caucasus and known as Suar Principality was forced to become a vassal state of Khazaria. About half a century later, the Suars took part in the Arab–Khazar wars of 732–737. The adoption of Islam in the early tenth century in Volga Bulgaria led to most of its people embracing that religion.

After the Mongols destroyed Volga Bulgaria in 1236, the Golden Horde maintained control of the region until its slow dissolution from c. 1438. The Kazan Khanate then became the new authority of the region and of the Chuvash. The modern name "Chuvash" began to appear in records starting from the sixteenth century from Russian and other foreign sources.

In 1552 the Russians conquered the Kazan Khanate and its territories. The Chuvash, required to pay yasak, gradually lost the possession of much of their land. Many Chuvash who had traditionally engaged in agriculture were forced to become bonded laborers in the timber industry or to work in barges due to growing poverty. Subsequent centuries saw the Christianization and Russification of the Chuvash. During this period, most Chuvash converted to Orthodox Christianity, but the Moscow Tsars never achieved their complete Russification.

After the conversion, Russian historian Vasily Nikitich Tatishchev (1686-1750) visited the lands of Volga Bulgaria and wrote that Bulgars also migrated to Bashkortostan and north of Kazan (i.e. modern-day Chuvashia).

Down the Volga River, the Chuvash, the ancient Bulgars, filled the entire county of Kazan and Simbirsk. Now, after receiving baptism, very few of them remain, because many, not wanting to be baptized, moved to the Bashkirs and settled in other counties.

— V. N. Tatishchev. "История Российская. Часть 1

=== Modern history ===
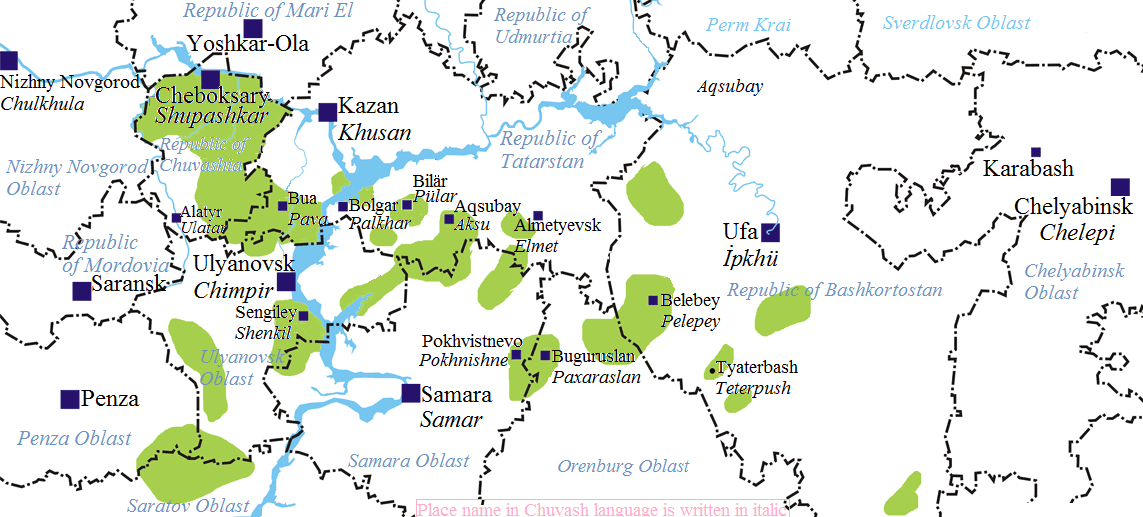
Chuvash diaspora in Volga Federal District

The 18th and 19th centuries saw the revival of Chuvash culture and the publication of many educational, literary, and linguistic works, along with the establishment of schools and other programs. The Chuvash language began to be used in local schools, and a special written script for the Chuvash language was created in 1871.

On 24 June 1920, the Bolshevik government of the RSFSR established the Chuvash Autonomous Region; it became the Chuvash Autonomous Soviet Socialist Republic on 21 April 1925. Around this time Chuvash nationalism grew, but the Soviet authorities attempted to suppress nationalist movements by re-drawing the borders of the republic, leaving many Chuvash living in neighboring republics or in Russian districts. During most of the Soviet period of 1917–1991, the Chuvash were subjected to Russification campaigns.

The Chuvash language vanished from educational and public use. In 1989, another Chuvash cultural revival began - partly in response to these changes. Soon the Chuvash language once again came into use in educational, public, and political life. As of 2005, schools in the Chuvash Republic and in areas outside that have large Chuvash populations teach the Chuvash language and culture. Chuvash people around Russia also have media available to them in their local communities.

== Genetics ==
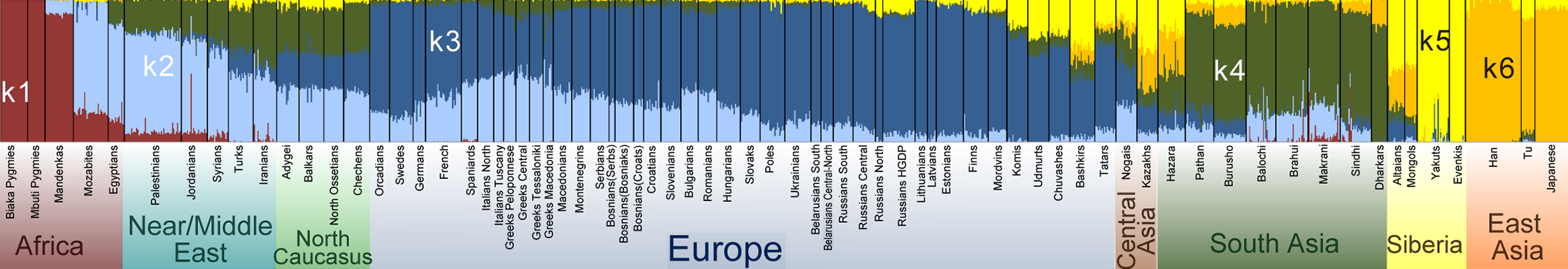
Autosomal ancestry proportions of the Chuvash and several other populations, according to Kushniarevich et al. (2015).

Physical anthropologists using the racial frameworks of the early 20th century saw the Chuvash as a mixed Finno-Ugric and Tatar people. An autosomal analysis (2015) detected an indication of Oghur and possibly Bulgar ancestry in modern Chuvash. These Oghur tribes brought the Chuvash language with them. Another study found some Finno-Ugric components in Chuvash people.

Phenotypically, there is no particular differences among the Chuvash, as more Caucasoid or more Mongoloid phenotypes can be found among all subgroups. In 2017, a full genome study found Chuvash largely show a Finno-Ugric genetic component despite having a common Turkic component with Bashkir and Volga Tatar peoples. This study supported the language shift hypothesis among Chuvash population.

== Culture ==
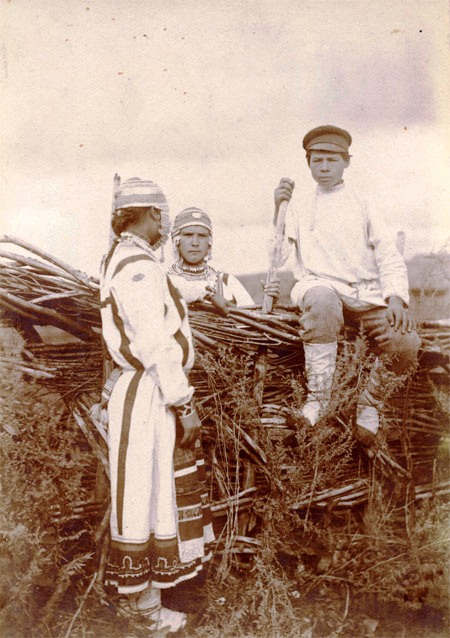
A group of Chuvash children with their traditional dress (Anat jenchi - Middle Low Chuvash)

They speak the Chuvash language and have some pre-Christian traditions. The Chuvash have specific patterns used in embroidery, which is found in their traditional clothing. Many people also use the Russian and Tatar languages, spoken in Chuvashia and nearby regions along the middle course of the Volga River, in the central part of European Russia.

== Religion ==
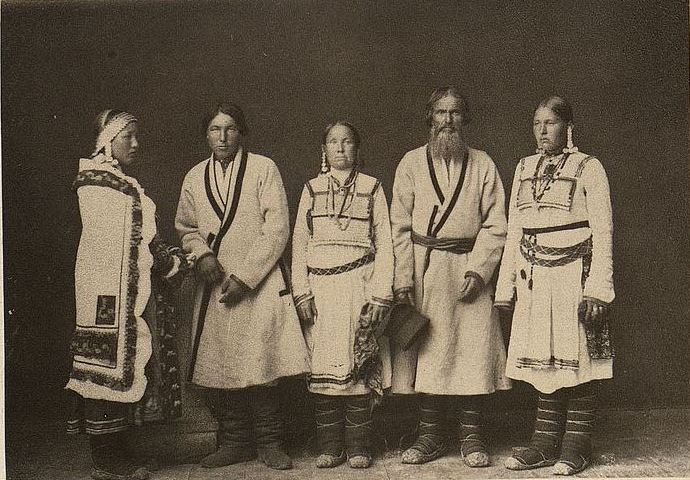
Baptized Chuvash people, 1870

Most Chuvash people are Eastern Orthodox Christians and belong to the Russian Orthodox Church while a minority are Sunni Muslims or practitioners of Vattisen Yaly. After the Russian subjugation of the Chuvash in the 16th century, a campaign of Christianization began. However, most Chuvash were not converted until the mid-19th century. The Chuvash retain some pre-Christian and pre-Islamic shamanism traditions in their cultural activities. Parallel pray in the shrines called keremet and sacrifice geese there. One of the main shrines is located in the town of Bilyarsk. Vattisen Yaly is a contemporary revival of the ethnic religion of the Chuvash people.

A minority of Chuvash may have been exposed to Islam as early as the Volga Bulgaria era but most of those early Chuvash likely converted during the Golden Horde period. An inscription dated at 1307 indicates that some Chuvash were converted to Islam, and religious terms occur in Chuvash in the form of Tatar loanwords. However, sources do not specify the practices of the Chuvash during this period. Some Chuvash who converted to Christianity following the Russian conquest converted to Islam during the 19th and early 20th century. During this period, several Chuvash communities were influenced by Tatars and became Muslim. This caused some Muslim Chuvash to define themselves as Tatars but they retained their language and several Chuvash customs.

== See also ==
- List of Chuvashes
- Turkic Christians
- Chuvash National Congress
- Chuvash National Museum
- Chuvash national symbols
- Chuvash State Academic Song and Dance Ensemble
- Chuvash Wikipedia
- ChuvashTet
- Bulgarism
- Chuvash numerals
