= Chuvash National Congress =

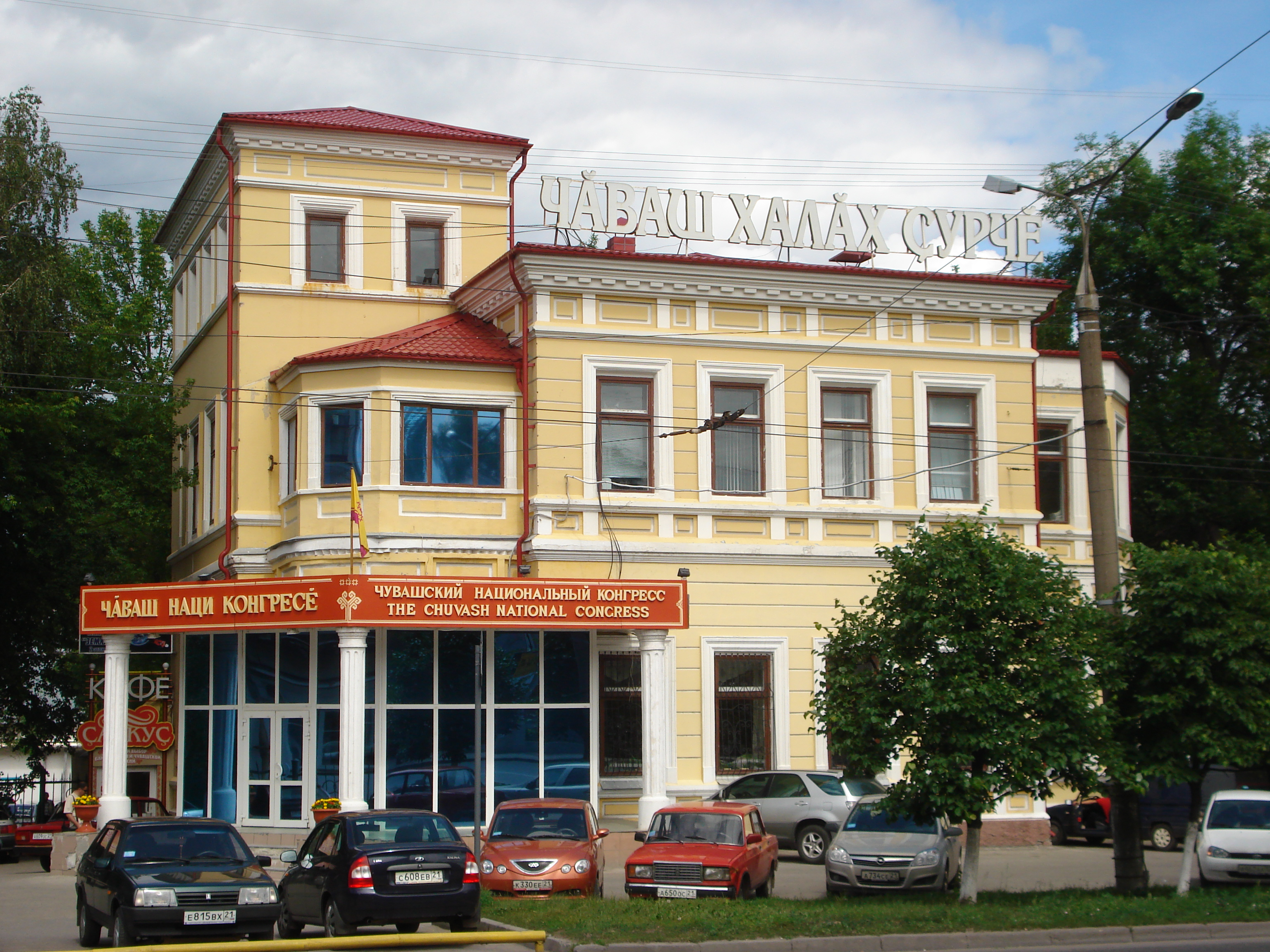
The Chuvash National Congress in Cheboksary, Chuvashia, Russia

The Chuvash National Congress (Chuvash: Чăваш наци конгресĕ, romanized: Čăvaš natsi kongresĕ) is an interregional public organization, which unites creative and national cultural potential of the Chuvash people.

Members of the CNC can be national-cultural autonomies and associations that exist in areas where the Chuvash, Russian regions and foreign countries, public associations, labor collectives of public and private enterprises, academic institutions, and individuals of the Chuvash Republic.

Hymn of the Chuvash National Congress is Chuvash folk song "Alran kaimi aki-sukhi ...". The organ of CNC is the newspaper Chuvash world (Chuvash: Чӑваш тӗнчи, romanized: Čăvaš tĕnči).

== Activities ==
Congress is working hard to strengthen inter-cultural ties between the subjects of the Russian Federation, inter-ethnic harmony and social stability, it is the organizer of many national and interregional activities of the Chuvash people.

Congress is actively cooperating with state authorities, administrations of regions and cities of the Chuvash Republic, is working to implement the concept of the state national policy of the Chuvash Republic. They work is focusing on assisting the Chuvash diaspora in preserving ethnic identity and the development of culture of the Chuvash people, the creation of national-cultural associations.

In October 8–9, 1992 in Cheboksary the 1st Congress of Chuvash National Congress convened by the Resolution of the Presidium of the Supreme Soviet of the Chuvash ASSR.

In 2005, outside of the Chuvash Republic Chuvash operated 67 national-cultural associations, and on 1 January 2009, that was 79. They are formed in 29 regions of the Russian Federation (including 12 regions of the Volga Federal District) and 6 foreign countries.

== Chronology ==
Interregional Public Organization "Chuvash National Congress" was established on October 8–9, 1992 at the founding meeting. Was elected president Atner Khuzangai, chairman of the Committee on Education and International Relations of the State Council of the Chuvash Republic.

In 1992-1993, CNC participated in the development of the law "On the languages of the Chuvash Republic."

In 1992, the Chuvash National Congress joined the Assembly of Turkic peoples (ATP), in 1993 - in the Organization of Non-Aligned Nations and Peoples, in 1994 - Assembly of peoples of the Volga and Ural (APVU), in 1995 - the Assembly of the Peoples of Russia (APR).

Congress in 1994-2000 participated in the preparation of the Constitution of the Chuvash Republic.

In 1994-1995, spent preparing for the establishment of the Day of State (later - Republic Day). This festival is usually celebrated on June 24. To commemorate the 1100th anniversary of the Volga Bulgaria in the Park of the 500th anniversary of Cheboksary established "Unforgettable» Chuvash: Асран кайми post.

21–22 June 1995 CNC passed the II Congress.

In 1992-2002, Chuvash National Congress participated in congresses and conferences on national issues in the United States, the Netherlands, Estonia, Turkey, Kyrgyzstan, Kazakhstan, Crimea, Azerbaijan, Cyprus and other countries.

Since 1996, the PLS was the Grand Council meet on the territory of the Chuvash living outside the country (village Slakbashevo (Bashkortostan), Ulyanovsk, Samara region).

In 1997-2002, in Moscow, Ulyanovsk, Samara, Saratov, Tatarstan, Krasnoyarsk created Chuvash national-cultural autonomies.

In 1997, President of CNC Atner Huzangay elected vice-president of the non-aligned nations and peoples.

24–25 October 1997 Congress passed the III Congress. President of the Congress became Gennady Arkhipov.

In April 1998, Chuvash National Congress held in Berlin Days of Chuvash culture.

In 1999-2002, CNC together with the Ministry of Culture of the Chuvash Republic organized festivals of pop Chuvash songs. Later, he became known as an international festival of Chuvash pop song "Silver Voice".

21–22 July 2000 CNC passed IV Congress.

In April 2001, the Executive Committee of the CNC moved into the building 10 on the Vorob’ev’s composers street in Cheboksary.

In 2002 CNC participated in conferences Chuvash companies in Krasnoyarsk, Perm, Tyumen.

In September 2002, CNC passed the V Congress.

In December 2002, a delegation of CNC in the II Congress of the national-cultural autonomy of Moscow Chuvash.

In April 2003, CNC met with Deputy Chairman of the Executive Committee of the Assembly of Peoples of Russia.

In 2003, the first competition was held Chuvash ethnographers.

March 10, 2004 CNC representatives participated in the III Congress of the Assembly of the Peoples of Russia.

In August 2004, CNC participated in Tallinn (Estonia) in the Congress of Finn-Ugric peoples.

March 19, 2005 CNC passed the VI Congress.

Since 2005 in Morgaushsky District in the holiday camp "Scarlet sails" organized a special change for Chuvash children living in regions of Russia and abroad.

In November 2005, CNC held the first conference of teachers of the Chuvash language and literature.

In 2006, the first congress of the Chuvash of the Krasnoyarsk Territory discussed the concept of the Chuvash national culture.

In March 2006, the country was held for the first time the contest "Chuvash Beauty".

In December 2006, the Supreme Council of CNC in the meeting discussed various issues.

In 2007, the first held in Cheboksary holiday "Chuvash clothes."

In 2007, the delegation of CNC visited the celebration of folk art in Bavaria.

In June 2007, President of CNC attended the congress of Congress of Russian peoples (Yakutsk).

In 24–25 March 2009 Congress passed the XII Congress.

Since 2009, Cheboksary began conducting the most important holiday of the Chuvash people Akatui.

In October 26, 2013 passed the VIII Congress of the Chuvash National Congress. President of the Congress elect mr. Nicholay Ugaslov, deputy of the State Council of the Chuvash Republic.

In 2014, the Chuvash National Congress in order to develop and preserve history, culture and tradition in the Chuvash Republic decided to create in each district, city local offices.

== Chairmen ==
- Atner Khuzangai (October, 1992 — October, 1997)
- Gennady Arkhipov (October, 1997 – October, 2013)
- Nikolay Ugaslov (October, 2013 - October, 2021)
- Valery Klementiev (October 2021 -)

== See also ==
- Chuvash National Movement
- Chuvash National Museum
- List of Chuvashes
- Chuvash Wikipedia
- ChuvashTet
