= ChuvashTet =

Segment of the internet about Chuvash people or Chuvashia

ChuvashTet (/ˈtʃuːvɑːʃtɛt/; Chuvash: Чӑваштет Çăvaştet [tɕɒ̆ʋɐʂˈtʲet], short for Chuvash Internet (Note: Chuvash: Чӑваш Интернечӗ/Тетелӗ, romanized: Çăvaş Interneçĕ/Tetelĕ, IPA: [tɕɒ̆ˈʋaʂ ɪntɨrˈnɛtɕɘ̆/tʲɪˈdʲelɘ̆])) is the name Chuvash-speaking internet users commonly use for the segment of the web about Chuvash people or Chuvashia. It includes websites in various languages. ChuvashTet users employ both Latin and Cyrillic scripts.

Chuvash internet resources can be located in any domain (or do not have a domain), and corresponding servers are physically located anywhere in the world. Chuvash Internet usually refers not only to the World Wide Web sites, but the Internet and other services that are used for communication in the Chuvash language (messengers, IRC, email), storage and multimedia products on the Chuvash language (file-sharing networks, Internet radio, Internet television).

== History ==
=== Chronology ===
- November 1996 – an internet-portal of the Administration of the President of Chuvash Republic CAP.ru;
- 2002 – a table of Unicode characters have been added to version 3.2 computer code Chuvash Cyrillic letters Ӑ ӑ, Ӗ ӗ, Ҫ ҫ, Ӳ ӳ.
- March 2004 – opened "Analytical site about the Chuvash", which acted Forum for Chuvash language. Доменное имя Chuvash.ru было зарегистрировано 29 июня 2006 года на имя Иона Васильева. The domain name was registered Chuvash.ru on 29 June 2006 in the name of Jonah Vassiliev.
- 7 January 2005 – opened a forum „Çăvaş çĕlhi” to communicate to the Chuvash language at "ON-SVYaZI.ru".
- 25 August 2005 – earned an Internet radio station «Ethnicradio.net», which began broadcasting in the first Chuvash language on the Internet.
- 7 September 2005 – A system index under "Chuvash national site".
- 27 January 2006 – published the first article on the Internet at the Chuvash Chuvash language. The newspaper Suvar was published interviews with Ikăruk-th „Çăvaş Interneçĕ: malaşlăha pĕrle Uttar” (Chuvash Internet: Step into the Future).
- 12 March 2009 – at a meeting of the Interagency Commission for Chuvash language for the discussion of reports of NA Plotnikov, V. Yu Andreev and IV Alekseeva, it was recommended in the e-Chuvash written in the Cyrillic alphabet use Unicode characters for code: ă (U +0103), Ă (U +0102), ĕ (U +0115), Ĕ (U +0114), ç (U +00 E7), Ç (U +00 E7), ÿ (U +00 FF), ÿ (U + 0178) [10], i.e. Latin letters Ă ă, Ĕ ĕ, Ç ç, Ÿ ÿ.

== Problems ==
The development of the Chuvash Internet is limited by several factors:

- Reducing the number of speakers of Chuvash language
- Replacement of the Chuvash language of everyday communication
- Weak promotion of the Chuvash language in the new communications environment.

The decline in the social-economic area that occurred in the republic after the collapse of the Soviet Union's disastrous impact on the spiritual level of the population. Support for Chuvash language, literature, theater, part of the state was minimal, but help comes only in the form of grants.

== Criticism ==
The main object of criticism of the Official Portal of the Chuvash Republic «CAP.ru» is a violation of the provisions of paragraph 2 of Article 19, paragraph 2 of Article 26, paragraphs 2 and 3 of Article 68 of the Constitution of the Russian Federation, Article 8 of the Constitution of the Chuvash Republic, the Law Chuvash Republic "On languages in the Chuvash Republic".

The point of criticism is reduced to limit the rights of citizens of the Republic of Chuvashia on access to information about government activities in the Chuvash Republic Chuvash language, as the main language websites of state and municipal authorities, the Russian language. In particular, in accordance with Article 9 of the Law of the Chuvash Republic "On languages in the Chuvash Republic," the laws of the Chuvash Republic have officially published in the Chuvash and Russian, but the government sites are presented only Russian-language texts of the laws.

One reason for the lack of Chuvash-speaking texts is the imperfection of the software (content management system) portal site of the official authorities of the Chuvash Republic and the blast zone «CAP.ru» - lack of support for Unicode. For this reason: on web pages do not display Cyrillic Ӑ ӑ, Ӗ ӗ, Ҫ ҫ, Ӳ ӳ; in the guest book does not display Cyrillic Ӑ ӑ, Ӗ ӗ, Ҫ ҫ, Ӳ ӳ and externally similar to writing letters of Latin Ă ă, Ĕ ĕ, Ç ç, Ÿ ÿ.

In an information system "Portal of the executive power" of the Chuvash Republic is not a choice she laid the user interface language site.

== Chuvash Wikipedia ==
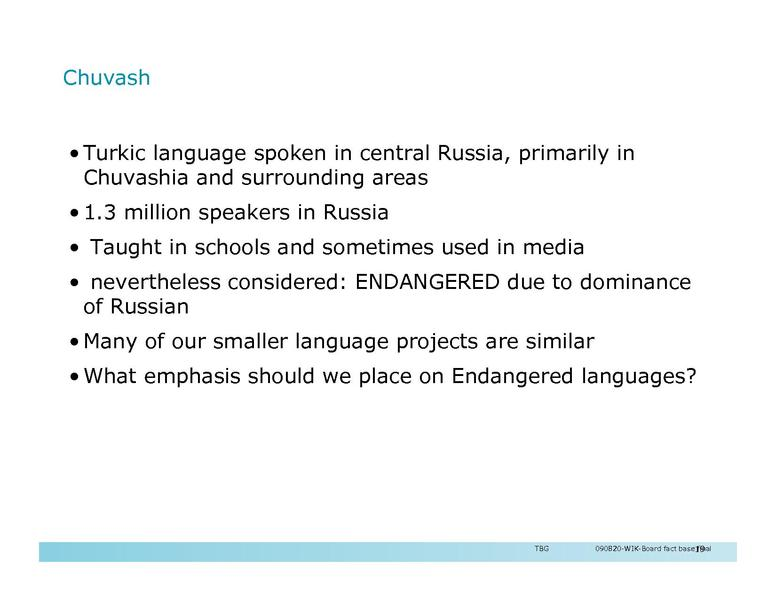
Slide presentation from Jimmy Wales

One of the largest sites of the Chuvash Internet is Wikipedia (Chuvash Wikipedia). Wikipedia co-founder Jimmy Wales discussed the Chuvash Wikipedia at Wikimania 2009, noting that that example has shown the value of Wikipedia for the languages on the verge of extinction.

== Literature ==
- Алексеев И. В. Выбор символов для букв чувашского алфавита при размещении информации на веб-сайтах // Аспекты филологических, педагогических, журналистских исследований: Межвузовский сборник научных трудов. — Cheboksary: Новое время, 2009. — С. 244—250.
- Алексеев И. В., Дегтярёв Г. А. К вопросу о создании компьютерной терминологии на чувашском языке // Чувашский язык из глубины веков в будущее / Науч. ред. и сост. Г. А. Дегтярёв. — Cheboksary: Чуваш. гос. ин-т гуманит. наук, 2007. — С. 100—103.
- Андреев В. Ю. О поисковых системах Интернета // Чувашский язык и современные проблемы алтаистики: Сборник материалов Международной научной конференции «Чувашский язык и современные проблемы алтаистики». В 2-х ч. — Ч. I. — Cheboksary: Чуваш. гос. ин-т гуманит. наук, 2009. — С. 77-80.
- Дегтярёв Г. А. Компьютерти чӑваш чӗлхи: терминологие йӗркелес ыйтусем // Вестник Чебоксарского филиала Московского государственного гуманитарного университета имени М. А. Шолохова. № 6. — Moscow — Cheboksary, 2009. — С. 258—267.
- Дегтярёва И. В. Чӗлхе урокӗсенче Интернет пурлӑхӗпе усӑ курасси // Ашмаринские чтения — 6: Материалы Всероссийской научной конференции. — Cheboksary: Чуваш. гос. ин-т гуманит. наук, 2008. — С. 375—380.

== See also ==
- Chuvash National Movement
