= Chuvash National Museum =

Museum in Chuvashia, Russia

Coordinates: 56.145398°N 47.252661°E

- Чӑваш наци музейӗ
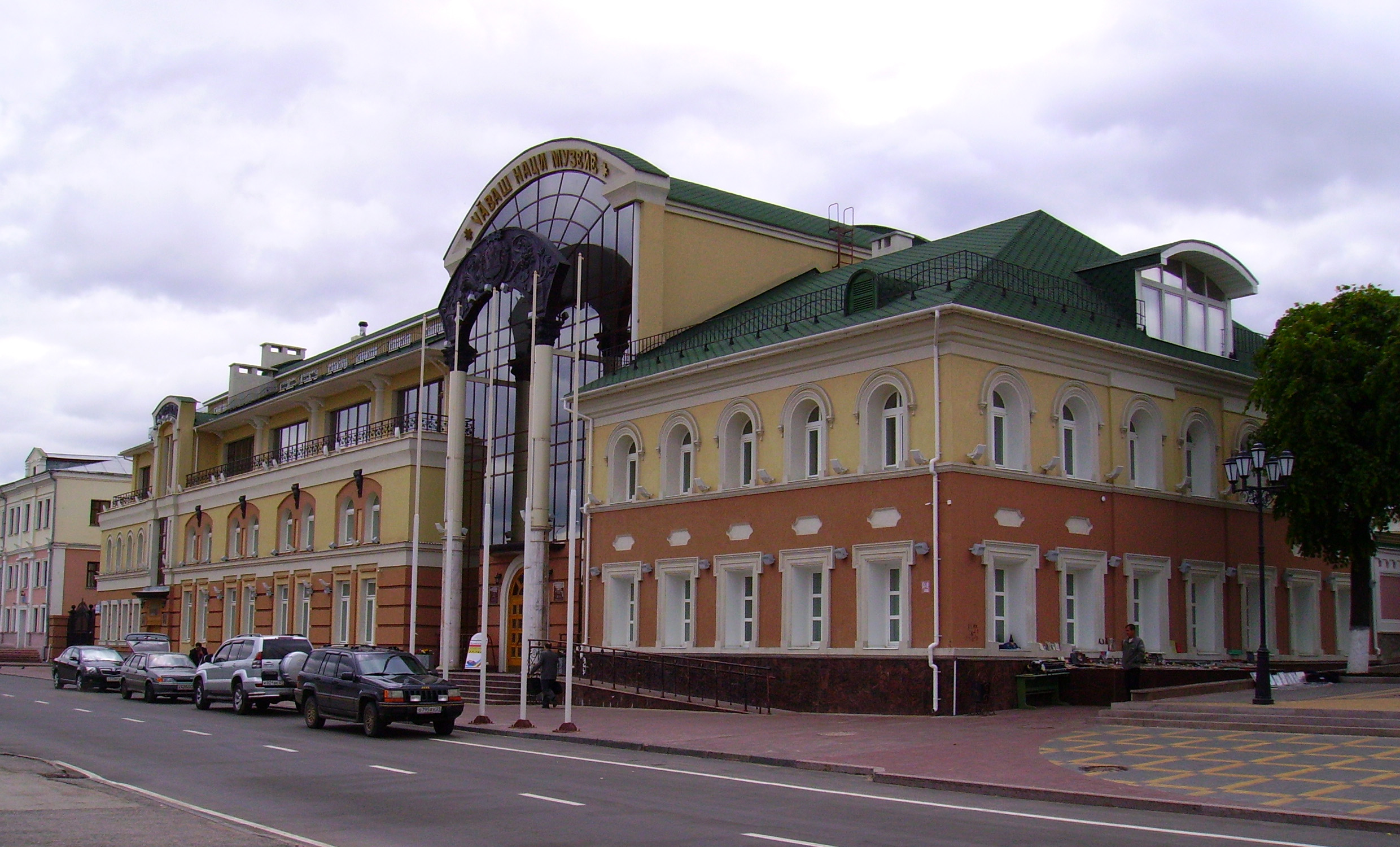
- Established: 1921
- Location: 5 Red Square, Cheboksary, Russia
- Director: Irina P. Menshikov
- Public transit access: trolleybus
- Website: http://www.chnm.ru

The Chuvash National Museum in Cheboksary, Russia, is a cultural, educational and research center of the Chuvash Republic. Founded in 1921, it is the largest repository of natural, historical, cultural and theological artefacts of the Chuvash people and other ethnic groups.

== History ==
The museum was established in 1921 as the Central Chuvash Museum, with N. P. Neverov serving as its first director. From its early years it functioned as a center for scholarly research into the history and culture of the Chuvash people.

In the 1930s the institution, then renamed a local history museum, was housed in the former Church of the Assumption, a Baroque church of the eighteenth century that had been converted for museum use after the closure of the religious complex. In 1981 the museum moved into the former mansion of the merchant M. Efremov in the city center, a nineteenth‑century townhouse combining eclectic forms with elements of provincial Classicism.

The Efremov mansion was substantially rebuilt during its adaptation for museum purposes, and only part of its original façade survives in the eastern wing. In 2005 the building underwent restoration, during which a third mansard floor was added to the structure

== Branches ==
The museum has four branches:

- Chapaev Museum (Cheboksary)
- Ivanov Literature Museum
- Sespel Museum (Cheboksary)
- Sespel Museum (Sespel)

The museum also houses the Society for the Study of the Native Land, an association of ethnographers that introduces the life and culture of the Chuvash people to the population of the Republic.

There are 160,000 pieces in the museum.

== See also ==
- Chuvash National Movement
- Chuvash National Congress
