= Alikovo folk theater =

Coordinates: 55.7°N 46.7°E

- Interactive map of Alikovo folk theater
- Address: Central Square; Alikovo; Chuvash Republic, Russia

Construction
- Years active: 1933-present

Alikovo folk theater folk theater of Alikovsky District of the Chuvash Republic, is located in village Alikovo.

== History ==
The library in Alikovo opened in 1933. Vasily Illarionovich Volkov, the native of village Siner, started to work there. It began cultural education of native land. Because of this, the youth starts to reach for the culture center. In 1934 V. I. Volkov organized the first theatrical workshop.

In 1967 young talents put on a comedy play «Виçĕ туй» («Three weddings») by A. Askhel. Execution of leading roles Veniamin Zolotov, Albina Orehova, Elena Hrabrova, Gennady Mihajlov and others are the present actors images. Arrived on viewing of this statement from Cheboksary the commission recommends to appropriate to drama collective of a name "Folk theater".

The first work of Alikovsky folk theater — a comedy play «Туй икерчи» («Wedding pancakes») by Mari playwright A.Volkov. The premiere has passed on November, 20th, 1968. In this first work of theater have flashed the V. L. Tikhonov's skill (Zolotov's maiden name), L. G.Gerasimov, A. G. Grigoriev, A. A. Janovich, M. M. Mihajlov, D. I. Illarionov, Z. M. Vintsova, A. G. Gurjev. The Director of performance was D. Illarionov, the artist — P.Aleksandrov, music — K. Volkov. Performance has passed 20 displays.

In 1990 folk theater leaves for ten days on tour to Bashkortostan, «Виçĕ туй» in the updated perusal participates in the All-Russia festival with a musical comedy. In 1992 theatrical collective stages the comic play «Юрату — хăпарту мар» (Love not the toy), takes out the same work on court of jury of republican festival of folk theaters. Performance 2 times has been shown on the Chuvash television.

== See also ==
- Valinke - Chuvash National ensemble
- Alikovo middle school
- Alikovo District Literary and Local Lore Museum
- Alikovsky regional palace of culture

== Literature ==
- Leo Efimov, Alikovsky Encyclopedia, Chuvash book publishing house, Cheboksary, 2009.
- L. A. Efimov, «Элӗк Енӗ», «Alikovsky District», Alikovo, 1994.
- «Аликовская энциклопедия», editors: Efimov L. A., Efimov E. L., Ananjev A. A., Terentjev G. K., Cheboksary, 2009, ISBN 978-5-7670-1630-3.
