= On the life's way =

- Type: Two time in week
- Founded: 1932
- Language: Chuvash
- Headquarters: Alikovo, Alikovsky District, Chuvashia,
- Circulation: 3,000
- Website: Аликовская районная газета «Пурнăç çулĕпе» website

On the life's way (Russian: По жизненному пути, Chuvash: Пурнăç çулĕпе) is the social-politic oriented newspaper published in the Chuvashia (Russia).

== History ==
The first issue of the newspaper was published on August 4, 1932, under the name "Collective-farm newspaper" (Chuvash: Колхоз хаçачĕ). In 1963 in connection with administrative-territorial reorganization in the Chuvash ASSR the newspaper stopped work.

In 1965 after a reconstruction of the Alikovsky District of the Chuvash ASSR the edition renewed work, but already under a name "On a Lenin way" (Chuvash: Ленин çулĕпе).

Since September 14, 1996 till this day the newspaper is issued under a name "On the life's way" (Chuvash: Пурнăç çулĕпе)).

== See also ==
- Valinke
- Alikovo middle school

== Literature ==
- L. A. Efimof, "Элӗк Енӗ" (Alikovsky District), Alikovo, 1994.
- "Аликовскому району 75 лет", L. A. Efimof, Cheboksary, 2002.
- "Аликовская энциклопедия", editing: L. A. Efimof., E. L. Efimof, Ananief, Terentief G.K., Cheboksary, 2009, ISBN 978-5-7670-1630-3.
