= Teneyevskoye Rural Settlement =

Coordinates: 46.854791°N 10.469842°E

Teneyevskoye Rural Settlement (Russian: Тенеевское се́льское поселе́ние; Chuvash: Тени ял тăрăхĕ, Teni jal tărăkhĕ) is an administrative and municipal division (a rural settlement) of Alikovsky District of the Chuvash Republic, Russia. It is located in the central part of the district. Its administrative center is the rural locality (a selo) of Teneyevo. Rural settlement's population: 900 (2006 est.).

Teneyevskoye Rural Settlement comprises five rural localities.

The Alikovo–Tautovo highway crosses the territory of the rural settlement.
