= Khirlepposi =

Khirlepposi Хирлеппоси Хирлеппуç Мелĕш
- Village
- Location within Chuvash Republic Location within Russia
- Coordinates: 55°43′55″N 46°39′35″E
- Country: Russia
- Chuvashia: Alikovsky District
- Population (2006): 245
- Time zone: UTC+4 (EET)
  - Summer (DST): UTC+4 (EEST)

Khirlepposi or Khirleppos' Melesh (Russian: Хирлеппоси; Chuvash: Хирлеппуç Мĕлĕш, Hirleppuś Mĕlĕş) is a rural locality (a village) in Tautovskoye Rural Settlement of Alikovsky District of the Chuvash Republic, Russia, located 6 kilometers (3.7 mi) west of Alikovo, the administrative center of the district. Population: 245 (2006 est.), mostly females; 539 (1926); 482 (1907); 141 (1859).

== Etymology ==
The name of the village is derived from the Chuvash words "Хирлеп" (the name of the river flowing through the village) and "пусь" ("beginning"). "Мĕлĕш" was the name of the first settler.

== Geography ==
The Khirlep River flows through the village.

Cheboksary–Alikovo–Krasnye Chetai auto route passes near the village.

== History ==
The village was first mentioned in July 1774, when Yemelyan Pugachev passed near it. First school in Khirlepposi opened in 1895.

As the village grew, some of its residents moved out to found new villages in Alikovsky (Small Melesh (or Pavlooshkan'), Toropkasy, New Selo (now it's Azamat), Khitekooshkan', Khoravary) and Krasnochetaisky (Melesh) Districts.

Until 1927, Khirlepposi was a part of Alikovskaya Volost of Yadrinsky Uyezd. On July 1, 1927, the village was incorporated into Alikovsky District and on December 20, 1962 it was transferred to Vurnarsky District. On March 14, 1965, it was returned to Alikovsky District.

== Infrastructure ==
The facilities in Khirlepposi include a club, a library, a first-aid post, and a store.

There are five streets in the village: Tsentralnaya (Chuvash: Тĕп урам, earlier Chuvash: Хăркăн урамĕ), Komsomolskaya (Комсомол урамĕ), Kooperativnaya (Хăркăн урамĕ), Pereulochnaya (Тăкăрлăк урамĕ, earlier Хирлеп кукăрĕ and Турчка кукăрĕ), and Shkolnaya (Ускам урамĕ).

== Climate ==
The climate is moderately continental, with long cold winters and warm summers. Average January temperature is −12.9 °C (8.8 °F); average July temperature is +18.3 °C (64.9 °F). Record low of −54 °C (−65 °F) was recorded in 1979, and the record high was +37 °C (99 °F). Average annual precipitation is up to 552 millimeters (21.7 in).

== Notable people ==
- Anatoly Ivanovich Platonov (b. 1952), Head of Alikovsky District Administration (as of December 2007)
- Gennady Sapozhnikov (1933–2004), scientist, biologist
- Nikita Larionov, Chuvash, writer and poet (here young writer is creating first novel).
