= Raskildinskoye Rural Settlement =

Coordinates: 46.854791°N 10.469842°E

Raskildinskoye Rural Settlement (Russian: Раскильдинское се́льское поселе́ние; Chuvash: Ураскилт ял тăрăхĕ, Uraskilt jal tărăkhĕ) is an administrative and municipal division (a rural settlement) of Alikovsky District of the Chuvash Republic, Russia. It is located in the western part of the district. Its administrative center is the rural locality (a selo) of Raskildino. Rural settlement's population: 1,366 (2006 est.).

Raskildinskoye Rural Settlement comprises five rural localities.

The Cheboksary–Yadrin and Cheboksary–Krasnye Chetai highways cross the territory of the rural settlement.

== See also ==
- Church of Christmas of the Virgin (Raskildino)
