= Church of the Assumption of the Virgin (Alikovo) =

Church in Chuvash Republic, Russia

Coordinates: 55.7380°N 46.7489°E

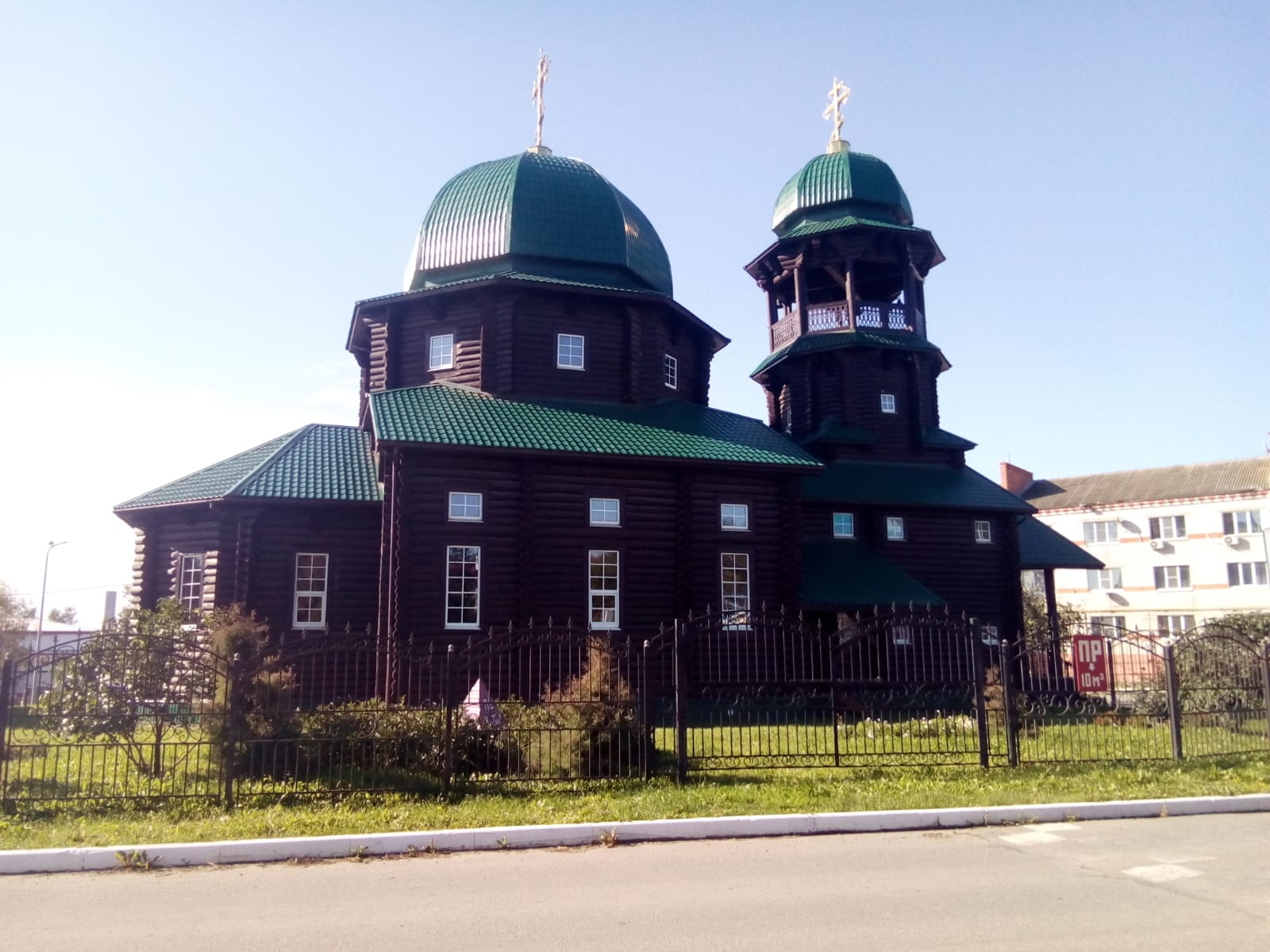
- Interactive map of the Church of the Assumption of the Virgin area

General information
- Location: Alikovsky District of the Chuvash Republic, Russia
- Construction started: 1744

Alikovo’s Church of the Assumption of the Virgin is an orthodox church of the Cheboksary-Chuvash diocese (the Moscow patriarchy), located in village Alikovo of the Alikovsky District of the Chuvash Republic (Russian Federation).

== History ==
There were 34 villages in the Alikovskaya volost of Yadrinsky district. 7900 people lived in these villages: 3917 men and 3983 women. In 1782, with the help of donations from parishioners, the Church of the Assumption of the Virgin was opened. The parish contained 18 settlements: Seener, Togach, Azamat, Yangoras, Videsjuch, Urmaevo, Izvanka, Ilgishovo, Ojkasy, Korakkasy, Tautovo, Hodjakovo, Khirlepposi, Toropkasy, Pavlushkino, Jargunkino, the Attic, and Horavary. Between these villages there were 1047 households in the parish, including 3007 men and 2968 women.

The Church of the Assumption of the Virgin was founded in August, 1744. At this time, it was a wooden building in the center of Alikovo. After the opening of the church, Tsarina Elizabeth Petrovna donated to the temple the book “The Complete Triode and Church Charter,” printed in 1745, with the following entry

“This book was produced by the printing house, and by order of His Grace Bishop Dmitry of Nizhny Novgorod and Alatyr, Kazan, it was given from the spiritual Consistory of His Eminence without money on December 3, 1747, to the Kurmysh newly-baptized village of Uspensky, Alikov, also, to the newly built church at the newly-baptized church.”

In 1755, 2 bells weighing 10 pounds each were brought from Yadrin for the Alikov Church.

From historical documents it is known that priests serving at the church in 1774 were killed by participants in Pugachev's Rebellion.

In 1782, a new wooden church building was built for the parishioners of the Alikovsky parish, and in 1901, a wooden church building was rebuilt at the expense of parishioners.

Beginning in 1930, churches began to be forcibly closed in Russia. In 1936, during a strong hurricane, the entire upper part of the church, along with the bells, fell to the ground.

In 1991, at the insistence of parishioners of the village of Alikovo and surrounding villages, church services resumed in the prayer house in August of this year.

On August 26, 2015, in the presence of parishioners, Metropolitan Varnava of Chuvashia solemnly held a morning service in the new church. Financial assistance was provided by rural settlements, schools, various organizations, parishioners and ordinary residents, and not only in the Alikovsky district.

== Church-parish school ==
The parochial school of the village of Alikovo was opened in 1845. This school used to operate in the village of Norusovo (now the village of Kalinino, Vurnarsky District of the Chechen Republic). In 1854, this school was relocated to the village of Alikovo and renamed the Church and Parish School of the village of Alikovo, Yadrinsky District, Kazan Province .

== See also ==
- Church of Christmas of the Virgin (Raskildino)
