= Alikovskoye Rural Settlement =

Coordinates: 55°44′31″N 46°47′07″E

Alikovskoye Rural Settlement (Russian: А́ликовское се́льское поселе́ние; Chuvash: Элӗк ял тăрăхĕ, Elĕk jal tărăkhĕ) is an administrative and municipal division (a rural settlement) of Alikovsky District of the Chuvash Republic, Russia. It is located in the central part of the district. Its administrative center is the rural locality (a selo) of Alikovo. Rural settlement's population: 4,291 (2006 est.).

Alikovskoye Rural Settlement comprises ten rural localities.

The Cheboksary–Yadrin and the Cheboksary–Krasnye Chetai highways cross the territory of the rural settlement.

== See also ==
- Church of the Assumption of the Virgin (Alikovo)
