= Yandobinskoye Rural Settlement =

Coordinates: 46.854791°N 10.469842°E

Yandobinskoye Rural Settlement (Russian: Яндобинское се́льское поселе́ние; Chuvash: Юнтапа ял тăрăхĕ, Yountapa jal tărăkhĕ) is an administrative and municipal division (a rural settlement) of Alikovsky District of the Chuvash Republic, Russia. It is located in the central part of the district. Its administrative center is the rural locality (a selo) of Yandoba. Rural settlement's population: 1,081 (2006 est.).

Yandobinskoye Rural Settlement comprises twelve rural localities.

The Cheboksary–Alikovo highway crosses the territory of the rural settlement.
