= Bolshiye Toktashi =

Village in Chuvash Republic, Russia

Bolshiye Toktashi Mon Tooktash Большие Токташи Мăн Тукташ
- Village
- Location within Chuvash Republic Location within Russia
- Coordinates: 55°40′17″N 46°37′03″E
- Country: Russia
- Chuvashia: Alikovsky District
- Population (2015): 200
- Time zone: UTC+4 (EET)
  - Summer (DST): UTC+4 (EEST)

Bolshiye Toktashi (Russian: Большие Токташи; Chuvash: Мăн Тукташ; English: Great Toktash) is a rural locality (a village) in Alikovsky District of the Chuvash Republic, Russia, located 11 kilometers (6.8 mi) southwest of the district's administrative center of Alikovo.

The majority of the village population is Chuvash. Village facilities include a club, a library, a first-aid post, a shop, and Ilya Toktash Literature Museum.

The Khirlep River flows in the vicinity of the village.

The climate in the village is moderately continental, with long cold winters and warm summers. Average January temperature is −12.9 °C (8.8 °F); average July temperature—18.3 °C (64.9 °F). The absolute minimum recorded in the village is −44 °C (−47 °F), and the absolute maximum—37 °C (99 °F). Annual precipitation is up to 552 millimeters (21.7 in).

== Etymology ==
The Chuvash word măn means 'big', while Toktash is a proper name.

== Notable people ==
- Anatoly Serep, Chuvash writer
- Arkady Malov, Chuvash writer, translator
- Ille Toktash, Chuvash writer, poet, translator, folklorist
- Gerasim Pileš, Chuvash writer, grafic artist, playwright, sculptor
- Nikolai Ivanov, Chuvash artist
