= Bolshevylskoye Rural Settlement =

Bolshevylskoye Rural Settlement (Russian: Большевыльское се́льское поселе́ние; Chuvash: Мăн Вылă ял тăрăхĕ, Măn Vylă jal tărăkhĕ) is an administrative and municipal division (a rural settlement) of Alikovsky District of the Chuvash Republic, Russia. It is located in the central part of the district. Its administrative center is the rural locality (a village) of Bolshaya Vyla. Rural settlement's population: 1,279 (2006 est.).

Bolshevylskoye Rural Settlement comprises three rural localities.

The Cheboksary–Yadrin highway crosses the territory of the rural settlement.
