= Krymzaraykinskoye Rural Settlement =

Rural settlement in Alikovsky District, Chuvash Republic, Russia

Coordinates: 46.854791°N 10.469842°E

Krymzaraykinskoye Rural Settlement (Russian: Крымзарайкинское се́льское поселе́ние; Chuvash: Крымсарайкă ял тăрăхĕ, Krymzaraykă jal tărăkhĕ) is an administrative and municipal division (a rural settlement) of Alikovsky District of the Chuvash Republic, Russia. It is located in the central part of the district. Its administrative center is the rural locality (a selo) of Krymzaraykino. Rural settlement's population: 1,081 (2006 est.).

Krymzaraykinskoye Rural Settlement comprises nine rural localities.

The Cheboksary–Yadrin highway crosses the territory of the rural settlement.
