= Shumshevashskoye Rural Settlement =

Coordinates: 55.78718°N 46.56478°E

Shumshevashskoye Rural Settlement (Russian: Шумшевашское се́льское поселе́ние; Chuvash: Шĕмшеш ял тăрăхĕ, Shĕmshesh jal tărăkhĕ) is an administrative and municipal division (a rural settlement) of Alikovsky District of the Chuvash Republic, Russia. It is located in the central part of the district. Its administrative center is the rural locality (a selo) of Shumshevashi. The rural settlement's population in 2006 was approximately 2,289.

Shumshevashskoye Rural Settlement comprises nineteen rural localities.

The Alikovo–Shumshevashi highway crosses the territory of the rural settlement.
