= Ilgyshevskoye Rural Settlement =

Ilgyshevskoye Rural Settlement Russian: Илгышевское се́льское поселе́ние Chuvash: Йăлкăш ял тăрăхĕ
- Village
- Location within Chuvash Republic Location within Russia
- Coordinates: 55°46′N 46°46′E
- Country: Russia
- Chuvashia: Alikovsky District
- Population (2006): 1,026
- Time zone: UTC+4 (EET)
  - Summer (DST): UTC+4 (EEST)

Ilgyshevskoye Rural Settlement (Russian: Илгышевское се́льское поселе́ние; Chuvash: Йăлкăш ял тăрăхĕ, Yălkăsh jal tărăkhĕ) is an administrative and municipal division (a rural settlement) of Alikovsky District of the Chuvash Republic, Russia. It is located in the central part of the district. Its administrative center is the rural locality (a village) of Ilgyshevo. Rural settlement's population: 1,026 (2006 est.).

Ilgyshevskoye Rural Settlement comprises six rural localities.

The Cheboksary–Alikovo highway crosses the territory of the rural settlement.

== Sources ==
- Государственный Совет Чувашской Республики. Закон №28 от 19 декабря 1997 г. «Об административно-территориальном устройстве Чувашской Республики», в ред. Закона №37 от 30 июля 2013 г. «О внесении изменений в отдельные законодательные акты Чувашской Республики и признании утратившим силу Закона Чувашской Республики "О едином балансе активов и пассивов Чувашской Республики"». Вступил в силу со дня официального опубликования. Опубликован: "Ведомости Государственного Совета ЧР", №23, 1998. (State Council of the Chuvash Republic. Law #28 of December 19, 1997 On the Administrative-Territorial Structure of the Chuvash Republic, as amended by the Law #37 of July 30, 2013 On Amending Several Legislative Acts of the Chuvash Republic and on Abrogating the Law of the Chuvash Republic "On Consolidated Balance of Assets and Liabilities of the Chuvash Republic". Effective as of the official publication date.).
- Государственный Совет Чувашской Республики. Закон №37 от 24 ноября 2004 г. «Об установлении границ муниципальных образований Чувашской Республики и наделении их статусом городского, сельского поселения, муниципального района и городского округа», в ред. Закона №54 от 9 октября 2015 г. «О внесении изменений в Закон Чувашской Республики "Об установлении границ муниципальных образований Чувашской Республики и наделении их статусом городского, сельского поселения, муниципального района и городского округа"». Вступил в силу через 10 дней со дня официального опубликования. Опубликован: "Республика", №49-50, 30 ноября 2004 г. (State Council of the Chuvash Republic. Law #37 of November 24, 2004 On Establishing the Borders of the Municipal Formations of the Chuvash Republic and on Granting Them Status of Urban, Rural Settlement, Municipal District, and Urban Okrug, as amended by the Law #54 of October 9, 2015 On Amending the Law of the Chuvash Republic "On Establishing the Borders of the Municipal Formations of the Chuvash Republic and on Granting Them Status of Urban, Rural Settlement, Municipal District, and Urban Okrug". Effective as of the day which is 10 days after the official publication date.).
