= Chuvashsko-Sorminskoye Rural Settlement =

Rural settlement in Chuvashia

Coordinates: 46.854791°N 10.469842°E

Chuvashsko-Sorminskoye Rural Settlement (Russian: Чувашско-Сорминское се́льское поселе́ние; Chuvash: Чӑваш Сурӑм ял тӑрӑхӗ, Chăvash Surăm yal tărăkhĕ) is an administrative and municipal division (a rural settlement) of Alikovsky District of the Chuvash Republic, Russia. It is located in the eastern part of the district. Its administrative center is the rural locality (a selo) of Chuvashskaya Sorma. Rural settlement's population: 1,758 (2006 est.).

Chuvashsko-Sorminskoye Rural Settlement comprises sixteen rural localities.

The Cheboksary–Yadrin highway crosses the territory of the rural settlement.
