= Pitishevskoye Rural Settlement =

Coordinates: 46.854791°N 10.469842°E

Pitishevskoye Rural Settlement (Russian: Питишевское се́льское поселе́ние; Chuvash: Питĕшкасси ял тăрăхĕ, Yountapa jal tărăkhĕ) is an administrative and municipal division (a rural settlement) of Alikovsky District of the Chuvash Republic, Russia. It is located in the central part of the district. Its administrative center is the rural locality (a village) of Pitishevo. Rural settlement's population: 1,095 (2006 est.).

Pitishevskoye Rural Settlement comprises six rural localities.

The Cheboksary–Yadrin highway crosses the territory of the rural settlement.
