= Alikovsky =

Alikovsky (masculine), Alikovskaya (feminine), or Alikovskoye (neuter) may refer to:

- Alikovsky District, a district of the Chuvash Republic, Russia
- Alikovskoye Rural Settlement, an administrative and municipal division of Alikovsky District of the Chuvash Republic, Russia
