= Tautovo =

Name of several Russian rural localities

Tautovo (Russian: Таутово) is the name of several rural localities in Russia:

- Tautovo, Chuvash Republic, a village in Tautovskoye Rural Settlement of Alikovsky District of the Chuvash Republic
- Tautovo, Kirov Oblast, a village in Vikharevsky Rural Okrug of Kilmezsky District of Kirov Oblast
