= Nikita Larionov =

- Born: Nikita Larionovič Larionov; 7 February 1932 village Karmaly, Alikovsky District, Chuvash Republic, USSR
- Died: 22 September 2014 (aged 82) village Alikovo, Alikovsky District, Chuvash Republic, Russia
- Occupations: writer and poet
- Writing career
- Language: Chuvash, Russian
- Period: 1975–2014
- Notable works: Red ribbon Olimpic strip (1986)

Nikita Larionovič Larionov (Chuvash and Russian: Никита Ларионов; 7 February 1932 – 22 September 2014) was a writer and poet. Larionov was a member of the Chuvashia Writers Union (1991), member of the Russia Writers Union, and was a USSR sports master. He lived in Alikovo, Alikovsky District, Chuvash Republic.

== Biography ==
Larionov was born 7 February 1932 in the village of Karmaly in the Alikovsky District (Chuvash Republic). He was educated in the Chuvash State Pedagogic University.

In 1953, he became the cross-country skiing champion of Chuvashia among students.

In 1969 he achieved the USSR master grade for sports walking.

After completing his education, Larionov worked in the Khirlepposi School and Alikovo middle school as Chuvash-language literature teacher and physical trainer, while creating his first novel.

Nikita Larionovich lived and worked in the village of Alikovo, where he was an active community leader. Although he experienced the severe hardships of the war years, his poetry, short stories, and novels remained full of optimism, vitality, and faith in humanity. He demonstrated equal skill in both prose and poetry.

Being a devotee of a healthy lifestyle, Nikita Larionov always participated in international sporting events among veterans, won prizes. In 1990, in Budapest at European Race Walking Championships in the age group 55–59 years at distances 5 km and 20 km took 3rd place.

On 22 September 2014 he died of heart failure. He was buried in a country churchyard, near the grave of his wife.

== Literary creativity ==
Lariomov grew up during World War II, but his verses and novels are very optimistic. His works were published in the magazines Тӑван Атӑл (Own Atăl) and Ялав (Banner), and the newspaper Пурнӑҫ ҫулӗпе (On Life's Way).

He has written 16 books, among them:

- Йӗпкӗн хӗрлӗ хӑю, ("Red Ribbon"), Cheboksary.
- Олимпийский балл, ("Olimpic Strip"), novel, Moscow, 1986.
- Хӗр тупри (Girl's wealth), Alikovo-Cheboksary, 2001.
- Ват ӑшши (Indian Summer), Cheboksary, 2010.
- Асамлӑ маҫ (Magical solution), Cheboksary, 2012.

== Literature ==
- Аликовская энциклопедия, редколлегия: Ефимов Л.А., Ефимов Е.Л., Ананьев А. А., Терентьев Г. К., Cheboksary, 2009, ISBN 978-5-7670-1630-3.
