= Ivan Yakovlev =

Chuvash enlightener, educator, and writer

- Иван Яковлевич Яковлев Яккӑвлӗв Йӑван Яккӑлчӗ
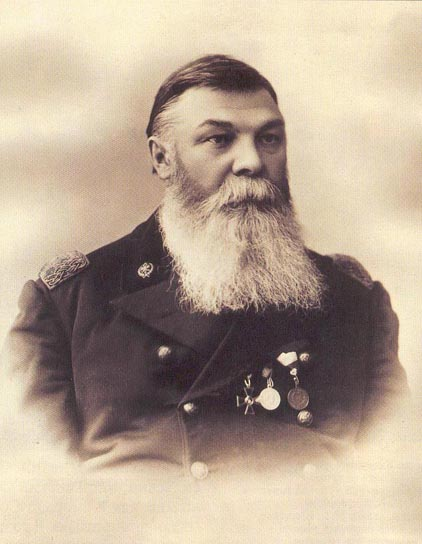
- Born: Koshki-Novotimbaeyvo, Buinsky Uyezd, Simbirsk Governorate, Russian Empire
- Citizenship: Russian Empire, USSR
- Occupation: Educator
- Writing career
- Language: Chuvash, Russian
- Subjects: Education, pedagogy, writer, translator

Ivan Yakovlevich Yakovlev (Russian: Иван Яковлевич Яковлев, Chuvash: Яккӑвлӗв Йӑван Яккӑлчӗ, romanized: Yakkăvlĕv Yăvan Yakkălçĕ) (25 April [O.S. 13 April] 1848, Koshki-Novotimbaeyvo, today's Tatarstan - October 23, 1930, Moscow) was a Chuvash enlightener, educator, and writer.

In 1875, Ivan Yakovlev was graduated from the Kazan University. While he was still a gymnasium student, he invested his own capital and private donations into the establishment of Simbirsk Chuvash School in 1868. Thanks to the efforts of Ilya Ulyanov (Vladimir Lenin's father), this school would be funded by the government starting 1871. In 1877, the school was transformed into Simbirsk Central Chuvash School. After his graduation from the university, Ivan Yakovlev worked as an inspector of Chuvash schools in the Kazan School District (until 1903) and headed the Chuvash School for Teachers (until October 1919). Ivan Yakovlev contributed to the establishing of Chuvash and other national schools in the Volga region. He was the one to create special instruction methods based on Konstantin Ushinsky’s pedagogical legacy. In the early 1870s, Ivan Yakovlev put together a new Chuvash alphabet, wrote several primers and textbooks based on the Russian alphabet. He is also known for having translated some of the Russian writers into the Chuvash language (Alexander Pushkin, Ivan Krylov, Leo Tolstoy, Nikolai Nekrasov and others).

The Chuvash State Pedagogical Institute bears Ivan Yakovlev’s name. There is also a monument and a museum of Ivan Yakovlev in Cheboksary.

Alikovo middle school bears Ivan Yakovlev’s name.

== See also ==
- Gennady Volkov (educator)

== Literature ==
- Дело его жизни. Сборник научных статей. Издатель — фонд им. Яковлева. Редактор Кириллов И. П. Cheboksary, 2008.
- Итоги юбилейной научной сессии, посвященной столетию со дня рождения И. Я. Яковлева, «Записки Чувашского н.-и. института языка, литературы и истории», 1949. в. 3;
- Краснов Н. Г. Иван Яковлевич Яковлев. Жизнь. Деятельность. Педагогические идеи. Очерки. Cheboksary, 1976.
- Этнопедагогический манифест И. Я. Яковлева. Cheboksary, 2003. ISBN 5-86765-253-X
- Волков Г. Н. Жизнь, смерть и бессмертие патриарха. Cheboksary, 2004. ISBN 5-86765-268-8
- Симбирская чувашская школа. Квартира И. Я. Яковлева. Путеводитель. — Ul'yanovsk: Издательство «Корпорация технологий продвижения», 2003. — 24 с.
