= Virjal =

Turkic people of Eastern Europe and Central Asia

Upper Chuvash Virjal, Turi
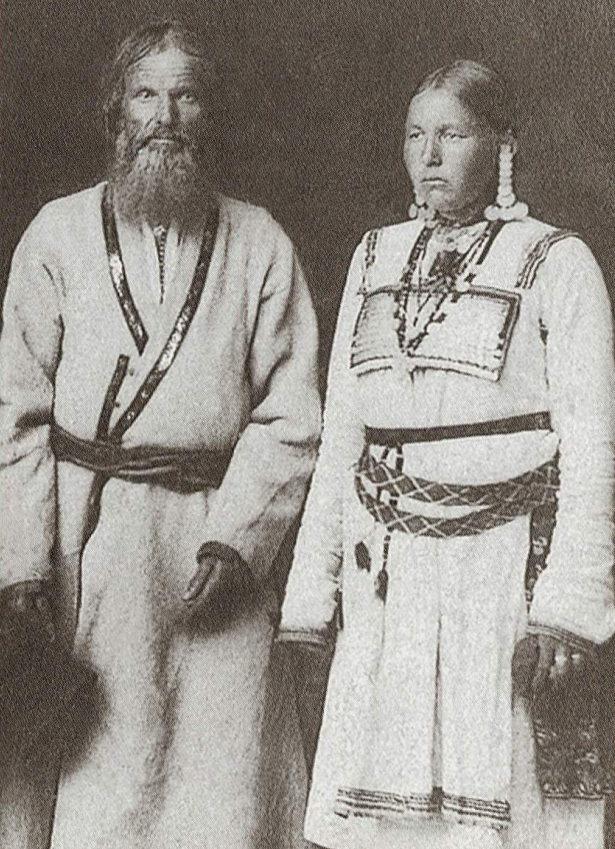

Total population
- approx. 170000

Regions with significant populations
- Russia, Chuvashia, Mari El

Languages
- Upper Chuvash, Chuvash

Religion
- Russian Orthodox, Chuvash Paganism

Related ethnic groups
- Chuvash people, Anatri, Anat jenchi

Virjal or Viryal (Chuvash: вир [vir] — upper, west and Chuvash: ял [yal] — village, community) is a subgroup of Chuvash people. Denomination "Virjal", i. e. upper, living upstream of Volga River, is opposed to Anatri (Chuvash: анат [anat] — lower, east), i. e. Lower Chuvash, living downstream of Volga River.

== Origin ==
Some scientists suggest Upper Chuvash descend from Hill Maris, assimilated by Chuvashs. Anthropological analysis via mathematical simulation suggests Hill Maris and Upper Chuvashs are represented by the same anthropological type.

== Historical evidence ==
Russian chronicles refer to Upper Chuvashs and Hill Maris as "cheremisa gorniaya" ("черемиса горняя", literally Hill Cheremis).

== Traditional dress ==
Virjal women's dress cut is virtually the same as Hill Mari women's dress as Nina Gagen-Torn and others refer.

Virjal and Hill Mari had similar technology of making bast shoes which was different from the one used by Anatri. Upper Chuvashs wore long footwraps and puttees. Feet wrapping was thick, similar to that of Finno Ugric neighbours. Virjal had black broadcloth footwraps, Anat Jenchi (Middle Lower Chuvashs) had black and white ones, and Anatri had just white.

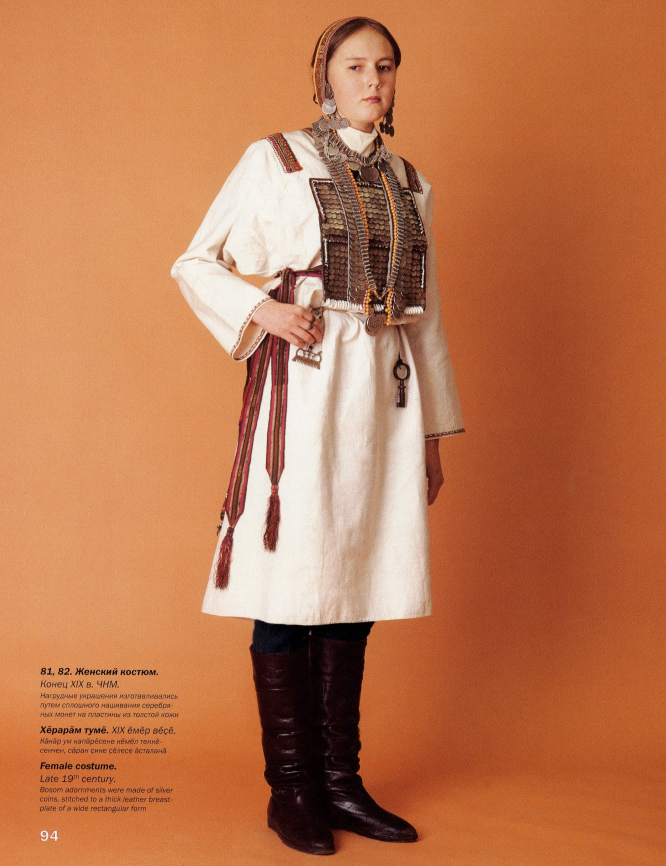
Viryal Chuvash traditional dress. Late 19th century.

== Dialect ==
In Virjal dialect vowel о [o] is often used instead of literary у [u] and sometimes others: окçа [okśa] instead of укçа [ukśa] (money), орпа [orpa] instead of урпа [urpa] (barley). Plural affix -сам [-sam] is often used instead of literary -сем [-sem]: лашасам [laşasam] instead of лашасем [lașasem] (horses).

As opposed to subgroups of some adjacent ethnicities like Maris and Mordvins which have distinctive differences between dialects, Chuvash dialects and specific ethnic subgroup cultural features developed relatively late. It is evidence of Chuvash ancestors in pre-Mongol era were basically united Bulgarian nation which was in process of ethnic consolidation. At the same time all the basic features of common Bulgarian language were formed on basis of different tribal dialects consolidation. Bulgarian language later became a foundation of Chuvash language.

== Toponymy ==
In some areas of Virjal settlement Mari toponymy is still used.

== Turi ==
Upper Chuvashs are sometimes called Turi [turi] (Chuvash: ту — mountain, hill). In pre-Mongol era there were two primary territories where Chuvashs lived and at the time they were distinguished not by the Volga river flow but instead by settlement on the left (hill, тури) and the right (steppe - хирти [hirti], or Kama area) banks of the river. During academical expedition of the 18th century Peter Simon Pallas described exactly two groups of Chuvashs - upstream of Volga and Kama steppe.

== See also ==
- Valinke - national folklore ensemble
- Alikovo District Literary and Local Lore Museum
- Volga Finns
- Virjal shevlisem
