= Narspi =

Narspi may refer to:

- Narspi (poem), a celebrated poem by Chuvash poet Konstantin Vasilyevich Ivanov
- Narspi (opera), an opera by Gregory Hirbyu performed in 1967 at the Chuvash State Opera and Ballet Theater
