= Boris Markov =

Soviet/Chuvash actor and theater director

- Борис Марков

Deputy of the Supreme Council of the USSR
- In office 1962–1966

Director of the Chuvash State Ballet&Opera Theatre

Docent of the GITIS

Personal details
- Born: March 7, 1924 village Khetakoshkan, Alikovsky District, Chuvash ASSR, Russian SFSR, Soviet Union
- Died: March 25, 1977 (aged 53) Moscow
- Party: CPSU
- Other political affiliations: Awards: Honored Artist of the RSFSR (1967), People's Artist of the RSFSR (1974), Honored Artist of the Chuvash ASSR (1953), People Artist of the Chuvash ASSR (1961), The State Prize of the Chuvash ASSR named after K. V. Ivanov (1969)

Boris Markov (March 7, 1924, village Khitekushkan' (now Tautovskoye Rural Settlement, Alikovsky District, Chuvash Republic) Chuvash AO, USSR - March 25, 1977, Moscow, USSR) was a Soviet, Chuvash actor and theater director, People's Artist of the RSFSR, People Artist of the Chuvash ASSR, the founder and first director of the Chuvash State Ballet&Opera Theatre.

== Biography ==
Boris Markov born on March 7, 1924, in the village of the Alikovsky District in the Chuvash AO (USSR).

Boris Markov was born and spent children's and youthful years in Khitekushkan' village ((Tautovskoye Rural Settlement)) of the Alikovsky District of the Chuvash ASSR. Having graduated from Tavutovsky school arrives in Cheboksary pedagogical college. Having finished training Boris Semyonovich teaches children at native school.

From the Great Patriotic War beginning Boris Semenovich leaves to be at war on the front against Nazi armies, serves in artillery.

After completion of war Boris Markov arrived to study in GITIS. Study passed in the Chuvash studio under hands. M. M. Tarkhanov. 1947 he returned to Cheboksary as the certified specialist. Seven years played leading roles in performances on a scene of the Chuvash academic theater of a name K.V. Ivanov. For a contribution to art Boris Semyonovich is awarded ranks of the national actor of the Chuvash ASSR.

In 1959 B. Markov having finished training in GITIS receives the diploma of the musical director. Him invite to create the Chuvash musical theater, he becomes the main director of theater. Boris Semenovich opens vocal and ballet studios.

In May, 1960 on a scene of the Chuvash state musical drama theater the first Chuvash opera — "Шывармань" (Water-mill) of Feodor Vasilyev is born. After a while B. Markov puts (for the first time in Russia!) B. Mokrousov's opera of "Chapay". Being the main director of the Chuvash musical theater, B. S. Markov in 1968—1972 works as the opera director in the Bolshoi Theatre of the USSR, gives lectures in GITIS, deserves a rank of the assistant professor.

In 1966 Boris Semenovich invite to work in the Ministry of culture of RSFSR. It works as the head of department of opera theaters of Russia.

Boris Semenovich Markov's died on March 25, 1977, in Moscow (USSR).

== Legacy of the Master ==
B. Markov is the author of articles on musical theater and book "The Birth of the musical theater of the Chuvashia", "My House", more than 40 articles on the art.

== Memory ==
- Tautovo school bears his name (Alikovsky district, 2010).
- Boris Markov's street (Cheboksary)

== Relatives ==
- Anatoly Markov (statesman) — brother.

== See also ==
- Nadezhda Pavlova - Soviet Chuvash ballet dancer.

== Literature ==
- О награждении Маркова Б. С. Почётной грамотой Верховного Совета Чувашской АССР : указ Президиума Верховного Совета Чувашской АССР от 06.03.1974 // Советская Чувашия. — 1974. — 07 марта (№ 56), с. 1.
- О присвоении Маркову Б. С. Почетного звания народного артиста РСФСР : указ Президиума Верховного Совета РСФСР от 09.10.1974 // Советская Чувашия. — 1974. — 10 окт. (№ 238), с. 1.
- О присвоении почетного звания заслуженного артиста Чувашской АССР : указ Президиума Верховного Совета Чувашской АССР от 19 марта 1953 г. // Советская Чувашия. — 1953. — 21 марта (№ 59), с. 1.
- Борис Семенович Марков : [буклет] / ред.-сост. И. Евсеева. — Чебоксары, 1994. — 1 л. : ил., портр.
- Канюкова, А. С. Жизнь, отданная театру / А. С. Канюкова, А. С. Марков. — Чебоксары : Изд-во ЧГУ, 1999, 134 с. : ил.
- Марков, А. С. Борис Семенович Марков — артист, режиссер, педагог / А. С. Марков, А. С. Маркова (Канюкова). — Чебоксары : [ЧГИГН], 2014. — 234 с. : ил., портр.
- Алексеев, О. Оперӑпа балет театрне — Борис Марков ятне / О. Алексеев // Хыпар. — 2001. — 16 ҫу. (in Chuvash)
- Канюкова, А. Чӗре ун театршӑн тапнӑ / А. Канюкова // Тӑван Атӑл. — 1986. — № 8, с. 64-66.
- Кондратьев, В. Борис Марков пурнӑҫӗпе паллаштарать / В. Кондратьев // Хыпар. — 2001. — 21 нарӑс (in Chuvash)
- Константинова, Л. Марковсен ывӑл-хӗрӗ — кашниншӗн ырӑ тӗслӗх / Л. Константинова // Пурнӑç çулěпе (Элӗк районӗ). — 2022. — 21 юпа/октябрь (№ 41), с. 7.. (in Chuvash)
- Романская, М. Унӑн спектаклӗпе театр пуҫланнӑ / М. Романская // Чӑваш хӗрарӑмӗ. — 2021. — 27 ҫу/май (№ 20), с. 7.. (in Chuvash)
- «Хамӑр ӗҫе фанатик пек юратсан ҫеҫ…» : статьясем // Хыпар. — 1994. — 26 ҫу.. (in Chuvash)
- Шинграев, В. Унӑн чӗри театршӑн ҫуннӑ / В. Шингарев // Хыпар. — 2014. — 13 пуш. — С. 4 : сӑн ӳкерчӗк.. (in Chuvash)
- Алексин, В. Жизнь дал чувашской опере / В. Алексин // Советская Чувашия. — 1994. — 28 мая.
- Бушуева, Л. И. Марков Борис Семенович: 1924-1977. «Я вложил в этот театр всю свою жизнь» / Л. И. Бушуева // Мастера театрального искусства. — Чебоксары, 2012, с. 217-226.
- Дмитриева, В. Борис Марков и его театр / В. Дмитриева // Чебоксарские новости. — 1994. — 26 мая.
- Ефимов, Л. А. Видный организатор театрального искусства Чувашии и России : (к 95-летию со дня рождения Бориса Семеновича Маркова) / Л. А. Ефимов // Чӑваш наци ӑс-хакӑлӗпе ӳнер академийӗн хыпарӗсем = = Вестник Чувашской национальной академии наук и искусств. — 2019. — № 1, с. 13-22.
- Заломнов, П. Д. Марков Борис Семенович / П. Д. Заломнов // Чувашский государственный театр оперы и балета и ведущие мастера его сцены / П. Д. Заломнов. — Чебоксары, 2002, с. 25-26.
- Кондратьев, М. Послесловие редактора / М. Кондратьев // Марков, Б. С. Мой театр / Б. С. Марков. — Чебоксары, 1995, с. 93-94.
- Макарова, С. Режиссер от Бога / С. Макарова // Советская Чувашия. — 2009. — 7 марта, с. 3.
- Марков, А. С. Б. С. Марков — основатель чувашского музыкального театра / А. С. Марков // Политические преследования и репрессии 1920 — начала 1950-х годов в судьбах интеллигенции Чувашии. — Чебоксары, 2014, с. 144-151.
- Марков, А. С. На театральных подмостках трагедии разыгрываются по-настоящему / А. С. Марков // СЧ-Столица. — 2000. — 26 янв. — 1 февр. (№ 3), с. 15.
- Романов, П. В. Марков Борис Семенович / П. В. Романов // Краткая чувашская энциклопедия. — Чебоксары, 2001, с. 263.
- Романов, П. В. Марков Борис Семенович / П. В. Романов, М. Г. Кондратьев // Чувашская энциклопедия. — Чебоксары, 2009. — Т. 3 : М-Се, с. 47.
- Талантливый сын своего народа. Борис Марков // Чувашия театральная. — 2022. — Апр. (№ 3), с. 6.
