= Yadrinsky =

Yadrinsky (masculine), Yadrinskaya (feminine), or Yadrinskoye (neuter) may refer to:

- Yadrinsky District, a district of the Chuvash Republic, Russia
- Yadrinskoye Urban Settlement, an administrative division and a municipal formation which the town of Yadrin in Yadrinsky District of the Chuvash Republic, Russia is incorporated as
