= Chuvash State Youth Theater =

Theater in Cheboksary, Chuvash Republic, Russia

- Interactive map of Chuvash State Youth Theater
- Address: 33/9 bldg, Moscow's prospect Cheboksary; Chuvash Republic, Russia

Construction
- Years active: 1933-present

Chuvash State Youth Theater of Sespel Mishshi is a theater located in Cheboksary, Chuvash Republic, Russia.

== History ==
The Chuvash state theater of the young spectator of Michael Sespel has been based in Cheboksary. The first performance «Young layer» ("Stamp") under L. Bochin's play took place on April, 3rd, 1933 — a date considered to be the theater's "birthday". Its founders are Edvin Davydovich Fejertag and Margarita Nikolaevna Figner — the Leningrad directors, teachers and tutors of the future theatrical collective.

The special actor's set at the Chuvash is a musical-theatrical technical school that became the basis of theater for children and republic youth. Performances were played in the Chuvash and Russian languages.

== Theater today ==
Chuvash state awards of Friendship of the people the youth theater of M.Sespel carries out statements on products of the Chuvash, Russian and foreign playwrights in the Chuvash and Russian languages. Now in current repertoire of theater 23 performances, from them in 1 half-year 2007 are put — 4 performances: «Test of the magician» by V.Gin, "Native" by A.Zajtsev, «the Gold chicken» by V.Orlov, «the Kid and Carlson» by Astrid Lindgren.

Because the theater has possibility to work on a constant scene only 15 days in a month, the great attention is given to tour and exit activity. Following the results of first half-year 2007 by theater it is shown in areas of republic of 55 performances, 19 — outside of republic. In April, 2004 the theater has successfully spent small tours in Moscow within the limits of the international festival «Moscow — a world city», in August, 2004 — Istanbul — Open space — Theatre », passing in Istanbul (Turkey) with performance «77 wife of Don Zhuan with Cemeterial an avenue» by B.Chindykov, N.Kazakov has taken part in the International theatrical festival.

== See also ==
- Chuvash State Academic Drama Theatre
- Chuvash State Opera and Ballet Theater
- Chuvash State Puppet Theater
- Chuvash State Symphony Capella

== Literature ==
- Вдовцева Людмила Пахомовна, "Понимать своего зрителя": очерк о главном режиссере А.Г. Васильеве/ Лауреаты премии комсомола Чувашии имени М. Сеспеля. — Cheboksary:Чуваш. книж. изд-во, 1979 — 192 С. с илл. — С109.- С.120 (Russian)
