= Virjal shevlisem =

Viryal shevlisem
- Genre: Chuvash music
- Dates: May 2012
- Locations: Alikovo village, Alikovsky District, Chuvash Republic
- Years active: 1997-current
- Founders: The culture, nationalities, information policy and archival business ministry of the Chuvash Republic, administration of the Alikovsky District

Viryal shevlisem (Chuvash: шевлесем (patches of light, glare; Chuvash: вирьял (Virjal) - riding Chuvashs) is an interregional festival of performers of the Chuvash variety song, carried out annually at the beginning of summer in Alikovo's village (the Alikovsky District of the Chuvash republic).

Founders: The culture, nationalities, information policy and archival business ministry of the Chuvash Republic, administration of the Alikovsky District.

== History ==
The festival has arisen in 1997 as regional review-competition of the Chuvash variety song. Winning in the course of time more and more admirers it has taken a place appropriate to in cultural space of area and being recognized far outside of republic, became more and more appreciable event in musical life of Chuvash Republic.

The holiday of variety creativity on the scene collects every year the increasing number of contestants, expanding popularity. During the existence the festival has accepted more than 2500 participants at the age from 5 till 40 years.

The festival Virjal шевлисем is not only a competitive program, but also an atmosphere of enthusiasm.

== See also ==
- Valinke - Chuvash National ensemble
- Alikovo middle school
- Alikovo District Literary and Local Lore Museum
- Alikovsky regional palace of culture
- Alikovo folk theater
