= Chuvash State Puppet Theater =

Puppet theater in Cheboksary, Chuvashia, Russia

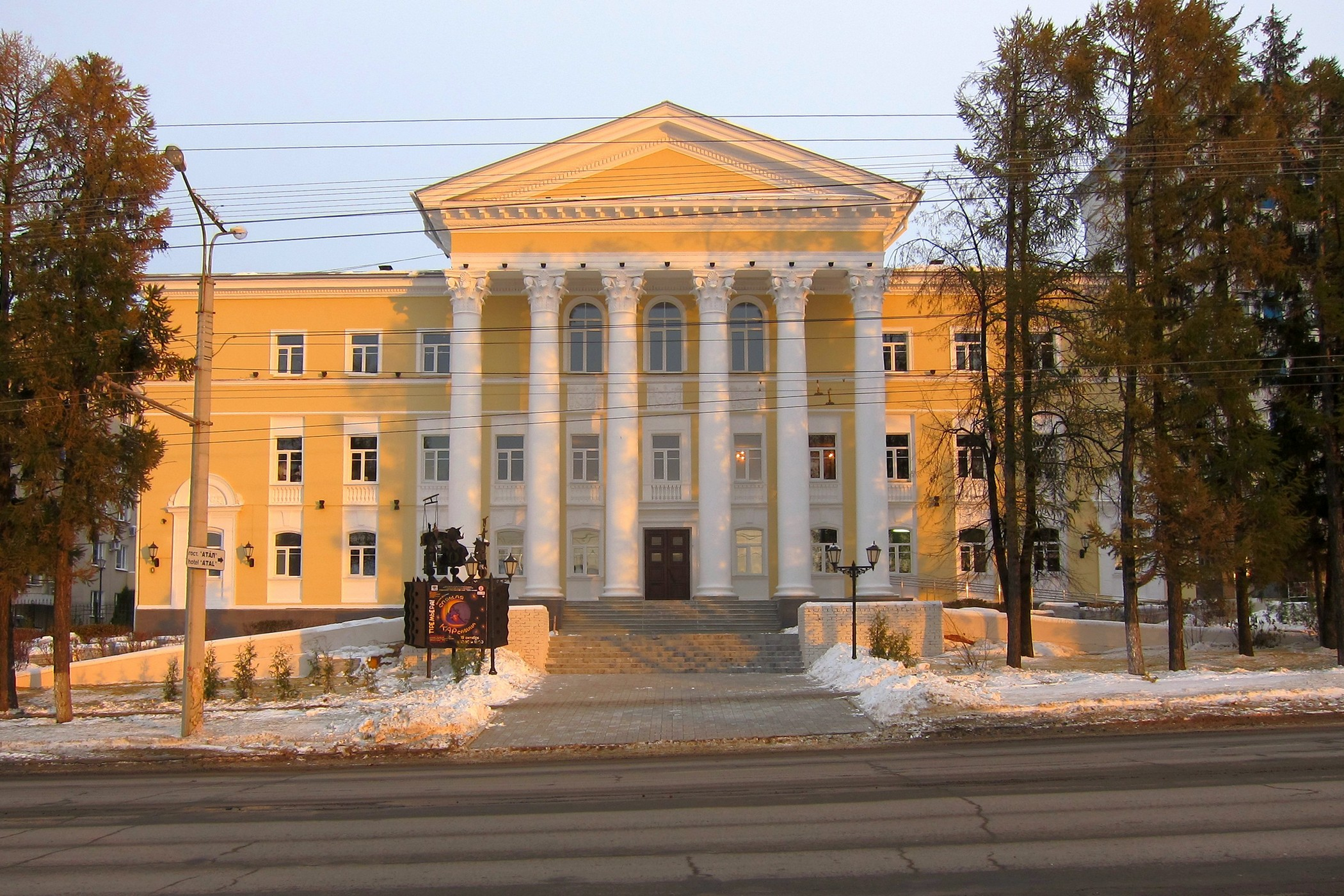
- Interactive map of Chuvash State Puppet Theater
- Address: President's Boulevard; Cheboksary; Chuvashia, Russia
- Coordinates: 56.1408°N 47.2450°E

Construction
- Opened: April 15, 1945
- Years active: 1945-present

Website
- http://www.puppet.culture21.ru/

The Chuvash State Puppet Theater (Russian: Чувашский государственный театр кукол, Chuvash: Чӑваш патшалӑхӗн пукане театрӗ) is a puppet theater, located in Cheboksary, Chuvash Republic, Russia. The group combines traditional European and national styles.

Theater is a member of the International Association of Puppet Theaters (UNIMA) and the Russian Association Puppet Theater-21.

== Actors and actresses ==
1. Alferova Nadezhda
2. Antonova Larisa
3. Vasil'eva Iraida
4. Gomza Alexandra
5. Zharova Julia
6. Zorina Zoya
7. Kalikova Alina
8. Kurillov Gennady
9. Klement'ev Piter
10. Kokshina Svetlana
11. Kouzmin Ivan
12. Mel'nik Julia
13. Mozhaeva Iren
14. Tarasova Ol'ga
15. Timofeeva Alevtina
16. Khor'kova Elena

== History ==
The Chuvash State Puppet Theater was founded on April 15, 1945 by theater director S. M. Merzlyakov.

On April 15, 1945 the troupe was shown a premiere ("Three girlfriends", author — S. M. Merzlyakov).

In 1951, the theater was eliminated, but a puppet team continued to work in the Chuvash State Philharmonic.

In 1958, M. Antonov (S. V Obraztsov's student) reactivated the theatre.

In 1996, the team wins the M. Sespel's Youth Prize of Chuvashia for its service to the arts.

== Awards ==
- 2024 – Grand Prix of the XXIV Republican contest "Patterned Curtain"
- from 2003 – member of the Russian Association "Puppet Theatre - 21".
- 1996 – Laureate of the M.Sespel Youth Prize of Chuvashia (for services to the field of theatrical art)
- from 2001 – member of the International Association of Puppet (UNIMA)

== See also ==
- Chuvash State Opera and Ballet Theater
- Chuvash State Academic Drama Theater
- Chuvash state youth theater of Michael Sespel
- Chuvash State Symphony Capella
