= Stanislav Voronov =

Russian artist (born 1957)

Stanislav Voronov (Russian: Станислав Кириллович Воронов, born 20 August 1957) — Lt. Gen. FSB, is a Russian artist and member of the Creative Union of Artists of Russia and member of the Union of Artists of Moscow.

== Early life and education ==
Stanislav Voronov was born on 20 August 1957, in the village of Toury Khorazan of Alikovsky District, Chuvash Republic (RSFSR, USSR).

In 1979, he graduated from Kazan Federal University, located in Kazan.

== Career ==
He went to work in the prosecutor's office of the Chuvash Republic, Acting Assistant Attorney District Attorney Investigation Department of the Prosecutor's Office of the Republic.

Since 1982, the State Security. Within two years of military service in Afghanistan.

From 1994 to 1999, he was the Minister of Defense of the Chuvash Republic.

From 1999 to 2001, he served in the Investigation Department of the FSB of Russia First Deputy Head of the Department.

In 2001, Voronov was a listener of higher courses in leadership training at the Academy of the Federal Security Service.

From 2002 to 2005, Voronov was first secretary at the Russian Embassy in Belarus.

From 2005 to 2007, he moved to the JSC "Sukhoi Company", the Deputy Director General for Security.

== Political activity ==
Votonov ran for direct nationwide election in 2001 as President of the Chuvash Republic. In the voting results, he took third place, followed by N. Fedorov (first place) and Shurchanov (second place).

== Artistic activity ==
- The representative of Impressionism. Member of the Creative Union of Artists of Russia, member of the Moscow Union of Artists.
- The main directions of work: genre scenes and landscapes.

Member of the Russian and international exhibitions.

== Awards ==
- Order "For Service in the Armed Forces of the USSR" third degree
- Gold Medal of the Artists Union of Russia "For contribution to the national culture."
- Grand Prix winner of the International Assembly of Art «Russian ArtWeek 2010.".

== Personal life ==
Married, with two children, Volonov lives and works in Moscow.

== Literature ==
- "Аликовская энциклопедия" (Alikovsky District's Encyclopedia), authors: Yefimov L.A., Yefimov E.L., Ananyev A.A., Terentyev G.K., Cheboksary, 2009, ISBN 978-5-7670-1630-3.
- "Это ярмарки краски!" Журнал "Русская галерея XXI век", No. 4, 2010
