= Chuvash State Symphony Capella =

Choir in Chuvash Republic, Russia

The Chuvash State Symphony Capella (Chuvash: Чӑваш патшалӑхӗн академи симфони капелли) — the musical group of the Chuvash Republic, established in 1967.

== History ==
In September 1967 in Cheboksary was established choir Chuvash Autonomous Republic State Committee for Television and Radio. The first concert band held 7 November this year. Organizer of the choir and its first conductor was People's Artist of the Chuvash Autonomous Republic, Honored Artist of the Russian Federation composer A. G. Orlov - Shouzm. The team promoted the Chuvash national professional music.

Aristarch Gavrilovic laid the traditions of the 1974 continued to associate the Chuvash Pedagogical Institute, member of the Association of Composers of Chuvashia, Honored Artist ChASSR P. G. Fedorov. When Peter G. Radio and Television Choir under his direction has performed in concert halls in Moscow, Minsk, Ufa, Izhevsk, Kazan, Gorky and other cultural centers of the Soviet Union, promoting the Chuvash choral art.

In 1986, conductor Maurice Yaklashkin headed choir. In 1988, in the magazine "Soviet Music" was noted:

You have now probably the best team of its kind in the Volga region and, perhaps, in the USSR, led truly dedicated M.N.Yaklashkin

At the invitation of the Secretariat of the Union of Composers of the Russian Federation the Choir performed at the congresses and plenums composers of the Chuvashia and the Russian Federation in the Rakhmaninov's Hall of the Moscow Conservatory, at the Column's Hall, at the House of composers & writers, concert hall "Russia" in Nizhny Novgorod, in Kazan, Tyumen, Ufa, Ulyanovsk and Saransk.

== Repertoire ==
The repertoire of the Chuvash State Academic Capella classics Chuvash composers (Fyodor Pavlov, Maximov Stepan, Anisimov Aslamas, Vladimir Ivanishin, Gregory Hirbyu, Phillip Lukin, Fyodor Vasilyev, Timothy Fandeev).

In 23–24 June 2013 in the Chuvashia was a big holiday - Republic Day. Chuvash State Symphony Capella, under the artistic director and principal conductor, People's Artist of the Russian Federation Maurice Yaklashkin, had been working to promote the best examples of the Chuvash musical culture.

== See also ==
- Chuvash State Drama Theater
- Chuvash State Opera and Ballet Theater
- Chuvash State Puppet Theater
- Chuvash state youth theater of Michael Sespel
