= Chuvash State Academic Drama Theatre =

Theater in Cheboksary, Chuvashia, Russia

Chuvash State Drama Theater
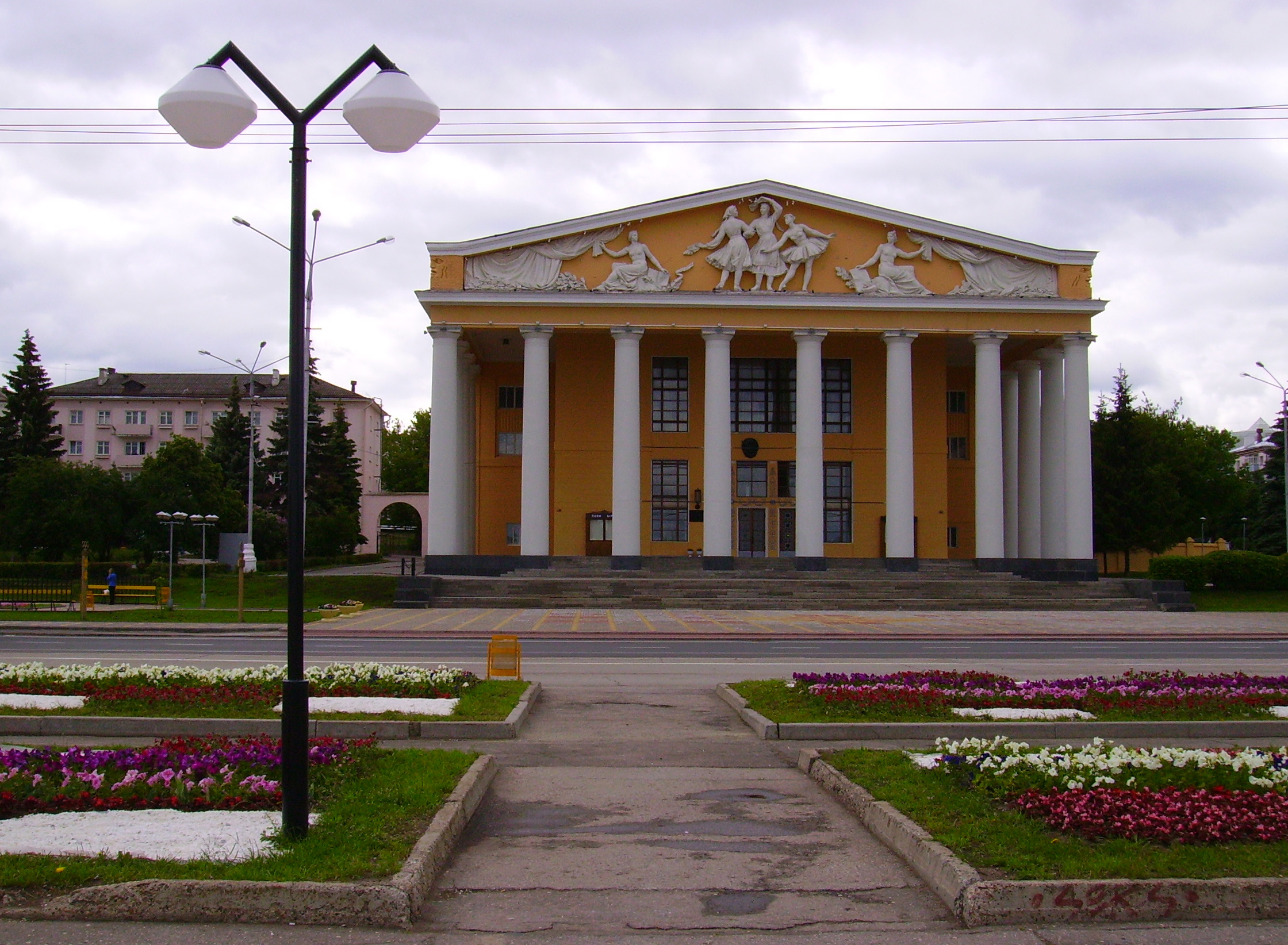
- Drama Theatre
- Interactive map of Chuvash State Drama Theater
- Address: Red Square; Cheboksary; Chuvash Republic, Russia

Construction
- Rebuilt: 2001—2002
- Years active: 1918-present
- Architect: A. Maximov

Website
- www.teatr.culture21.ru

Chuvash State Drama K. Ivanov's Theatre (Russian: Чувашский государственный драматический театр, Chuvash: Чӑваш патшалӑх драма театрӗ) is a theatre located in Cheboksary, Chuvash Republic, Russia. The group combines traditional European and national styles.

== History ==
The Chuvash State Drama Theatre was founded in Kazan in 1918 by theatre director Ioakim Stepanovič Maksimov-Koškinskij.

In 1920, the theatre company moved to Cheboksary and began showing plays of Chuvash playwrights and translations of Russian classics. Performances played in the Chuvash language.

PN Osipov served as theatre director from 1927 to 1939. Original art by theatre artists grew stronger from year to year. During this period, the theater collaborated with the best Chuvash playwrights, among them F. Pavlov, I. Maximov-Koshkinsky, N. Iseman, M. Trubina, Agachi L., A. Eskhel A. Colgan, J. Ukhsay, V. Alager, L. Rodionov, V. Ukhli, N. Terentiev.

In 1933, the theatre was awarded the title of Academic, and in 1959 it received the name of classic poetry Chuvash Ivanov.

In 1947, the theatre came GITIS's graduates (Chuvash studio, Tarkhanov's course).

The theatre won the State Prize of the Russian Federation in 2003.

== Theatre today ==
Now the theatre performs works by foreign playwrights: D.Marotta and B.Randone, Zh.Anuya; Russian - Ostrovsky, Alexander Pushkin, Roshchina, V.Rozova, S. Prokopieva and Tokmakova A. Larevo; Chuvash - N.Sidorova, N. Ugarina A. Chebanova, G.Medvedeva.

== Actors and actresses ==
- Kuz’mina, Vera Kuz’minična
- Jakovleva, Nina Mihajlovna
- Kirillova, Nadežda Mefod’evna
- Andreev, Arkadij Alekseevič
- Jakovlev, Valerij Nikolaevič
- Ver’jalova, Irina Vasil’evna
- Demidov, Aleksandr Oskarovič
- Dimitriev, Arsentij Valerianovič
- Grigor’eva, Nina Il’inična
- Zubkova, Nadežda Alekseevna

== Awards ==
- February 21, 2008 – Gratitude of the President of the Russian Federation
- December 29, 1977 – Order of the Red Banner of Labour

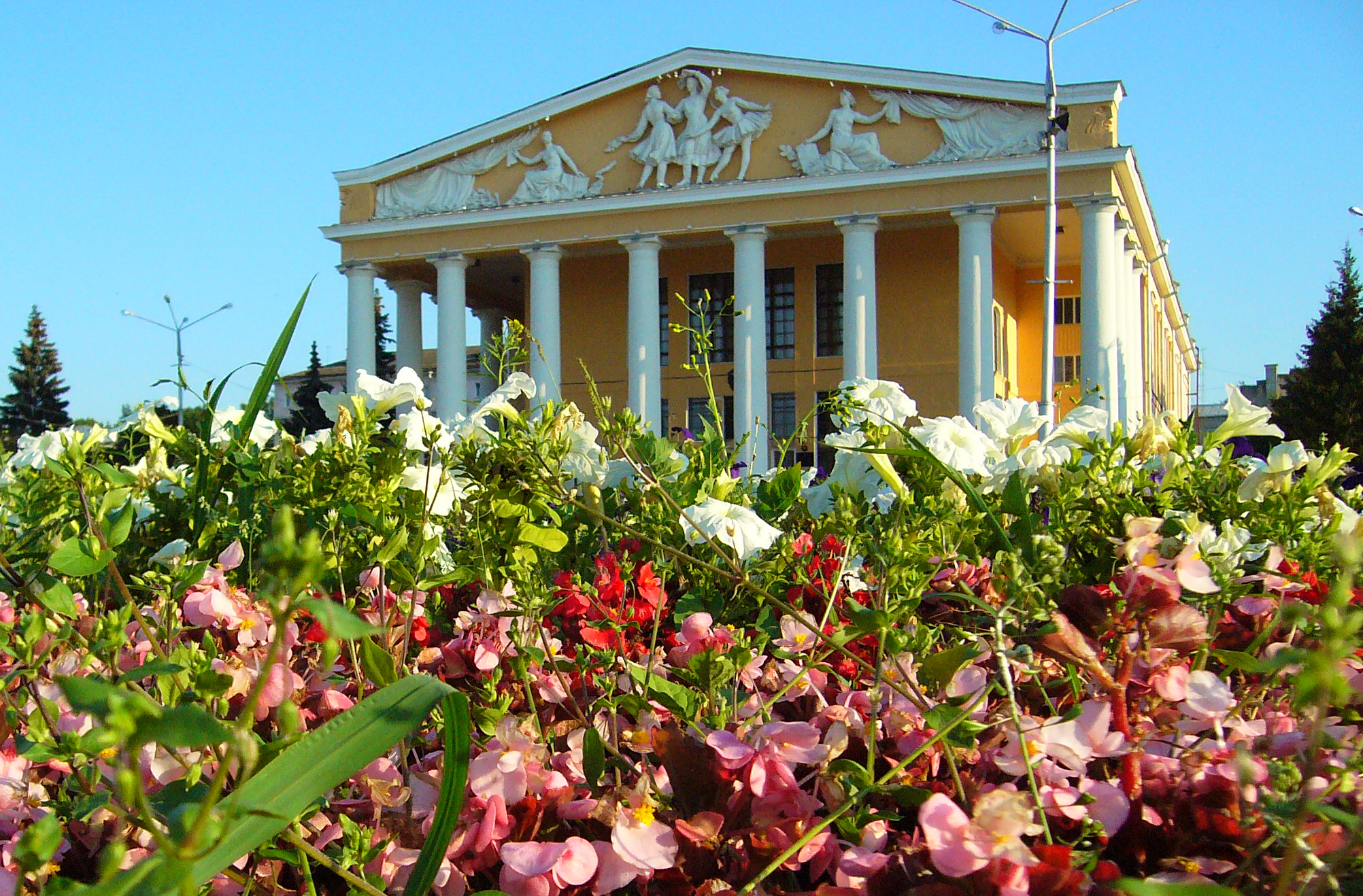
Thetare in 2008

== Literature ==
- Романова Фаина Александровна. Театр, любимый народом : Очерки истории Чуваш. гос. акад. драм. театра им. К. В. Иванова (1918–1988) / Ф. Романова; НИИ яз., лит., истории и экономики при Совете Министров Чуваш. АССР. — 261 С., [16] л. ил. 22 см. — 2-е изд., перераб. и доп. — Чебоксары: Чуваш. кн. изд-во, 1988.
- Вдовцева Людмила Пахомовна. Талант - всегда загадка : [очерки о А. А. Дуняке, В. И. Родионове и В. Н. Яковлеве] / Л. П. Вдовцева. - Чебоксары : Чувашское книжное издательство, 1984. - 94 с. : портр. - Библиогр. в примеч.

== See also ==
- Chuvash State Opera and Ballet Theater
- Chuvash State Puppet Theater
- Chuvash State Symphony Capella
- Chuvash state youth theater of Michael Sespel
