= Anatoly Serep =

Chuvash writer and poet

Anatoly Trofimovich Serep
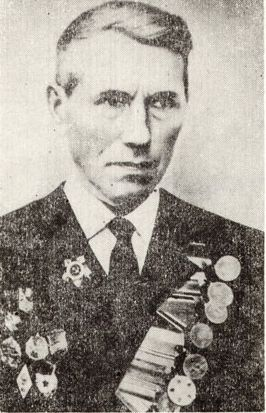
- Born: Афанасьев Анатолий Трофимович; 1920; Man Toktash village, Russia
- Died: 2003 (aged 82–83); Cheboksary
- Occupations: writer and poet
- Writing career
- Pen name: Anatoly Serep
- Language: Chuvash
- Notable works: Asamat; Moon song When Fathers Leave

Anatoly Trofimovich Serep (Chuvash & Russian: Сереп Анатолий Трофимович; 1920–2003), was a Chuvash writer and poet.

== Biography ==
Serep was born 1920 in the village of Man Toktashin the Alikovsky Districtof the Chuvash Republic, Russia.

He was educated in Kalinino (modern day Tashir), and studied pedagogy. He worked as a school teacher in the village Varmankassy of the Shumerlinsky District.

In 1990, Serap became a member of the Union of the Writers of the Chuvash Republic.

He died in 2003 at Cheboksary.

== Famous works ==
- "Уйӑх юрри" (Moon song)
- "Асамат" (Asamat)
- "Аттесем ҫук чухне" (When Fathers Leave)

== Literature ==
- Efimov L. I., "Элӗк Енӗ" (Alikovo District), Alikovo, 1994.
- "Аликовская энциклопедия", editing: Efimov L. I., Efimov E. L., Anan'ev A. A., Terernt'ev G. K., Cheboksary, 2009, ISBN 978-5-7670-1630-3.
- "Чӑваш литературин антологийӗ", editing: Gordeev D. V., Silem J. A. Cheboksary, 2003. ISBN 5-7670-1279-2 .
- Гордеев, Д. Пултарулӑх асапне кӑна турӑ панӑ / Д. Гордеев // Хыпар. – 1998. – 28 юпа.
- Гордеев, Д. Фронтри тата ҫыру сӗтелӗ хушшинчи паттӑрлӑх / Д. Гордеев // Хыпар. – 2000. – 27 раштав.
- Тимофеев-Ыхра, А. Мӑн Тукташ Корчагинӗ / А. Тимофеев-Ыхра // Пурнӑҫ ҫулӗпе (Элӗк р-нӗ). – 2000. – 9 раштав.
- Чул хушшинчи чун // Пурнӑҫ ҫулӗпе (Элӗк р-нӗ). – 2000. – 31 çу.
- Ялгир, П. Афанасьев (Сереп) Анатолий Трофимович // Ялгир, П. Литературный мир Чувашии / П.

Ялгир. – Чебоксары, 2005. – С. 16.
