= Tautovo, Chuvash Republic =

Tautovo Таутово Тавăт (Chuvash: Tavăt)
- village
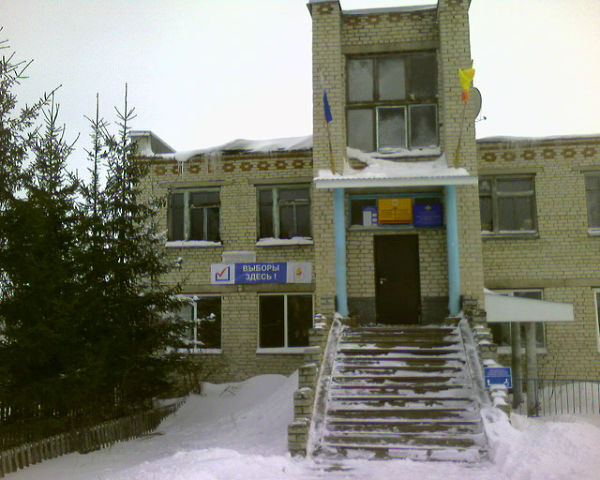
- Tautovo
- Interactive map of Tautovo
- Coordinates: 55°42′31″N 46°37′44″E
- Country: Russia
- Federal subject: Chuvash Republic
- District: Alikovsky District
- Rural settlement: Tautovskoye Rural Settlement

Government
  - Head of the municipal formation: Svetlana Y. Zheleznova

Tautovo (Russian: Таутово; Chuvash: Тавăт, Tavăt) is a rural locality (a village) in Alikovsky District of the Chuvash Republic, (Russia), located 10 kilometers (6.2 mi) from the district's administrative center of Alikovo. The village is the administrative center of Tautovskoye Rural Settlement, one of the municipal formations of Alikovsky District. The chief of the municipal formation is Svetlana Y. Zheleznova.
