= Gerasim Pileš =

Soviet Chuvash writer, playwright, sculptor and painter

Gerasim Kharlampyev
- Born: Герасим Дмитриевич Харлампьев; 2 February 1913; Man Toktash village, Russia
- Died: 2 November 2003 (aged 90); Cheboksary, Chuvashia, USSR
- Occupations: Writer, playwright, sculptor, painter
- Writing career
- Pen name: Gerasim Pilesh
- Language: Chuvash
- Notable works: Beautiful Morning; Love Doesn't Die; Little Tales

Gerasim Dmitriyevich Kharlampyev (Russian: Герасим Дмитриевич Харлампьев; 2 February 1913 – 2 November 2003), better known by his pen name Gerasim Pilesh, was a Soviet Chuvash writer, playwright, sculptor, and painter.

== Biography ==
Gerasim Pilesh was born on 2 February 1913 in the village of Man Toktash in the Alikovsky District of the Chuvash Republic.

He studied at Bolshetoktashsky Initial School, Hodorsky Eight-Year School, and later attended Rabfak in Nizhny Novgorod and the Moscow Art Technical School. Pilesh was conscripted for military service and participated in the Great Patriotic War. He worked at the Chuvash Book Publishing House and served as the director of an art gallery.

Pilesh died on 2 November 2003 in Cheboksary.

== Literary career ==
Pileš emerged in Chuvash literature as a master of short plays and children's stories. Later, Gerasim Dmitriyevich wrote stories and novels. His plays, such as "Кӑмӑл уҫӑлсан" ("Desire Birth"), "Ҫурхи кӗвӗсем" ("Spring Motives"), and "Юрату вилӗмсӗр" ("Love Is Immortal"), continue to be performed with pleasure in Chuvash theaters. The drama "Love Is Immortal" was staged at the Ukrainian State Drama Theater in Kiev.

Gerasim Dmitriyevich also participated in art exhibitions and wrote sketches about Chuvash artists M. Spiridonov and N. Sverchkov.

He was actively involved with Kapkan magazine.

== Notable works ==
- «Илемлӗ ир» ("Beautiful Morning")
- «Юрату вилӗмсӗр» ("Love Doesn't Die")
- «Йӑлтӑр ҫӑлкуҫ» ("Brilliant Spring")
- «Тӑрнасен ташши» ("Dance of the Crane")
- «Пӗчӗк ҫеҫ юмахсем» ("Little Tales")
- «Иртнӗ ҫулсенче» ("In the Past Years")
- «Ытарайми ҫӗршывра» ("In the Native Country")
- «Вӑрман юрри» ("Forest Song")

== Literature ==
- "Аликовская энциклопедия" (Alikovo District), editing: Efimov L.A., Efimov E.L., Anan'ev A. A., Terent'ev G. K., Cheboksary, 2009, ISBN 978-5-7670-1630-3.
- "Чӑваш литературин антологийӗ", editing: D. V. Gordeev, J. A. Silem, Cheboksary, 2003. ISBN 5-7670-1279-2 .
- П. Афанасьев, "Писатели Чувашии", Cheboksary, 2006
