= Anat jenchi =

Middle-low Chuvash ( Anat Jenchi ) - are a sub-ethnos of the Chuvash. Their native area of settlement is in the northeast of Chuvashia. As a result of migrations, representatives of the middle-lower Chuvash have also settled in many other parts of the Southern Urals and Volga regions.

== Culture ==
Middle Chuvash Anat Jenchi
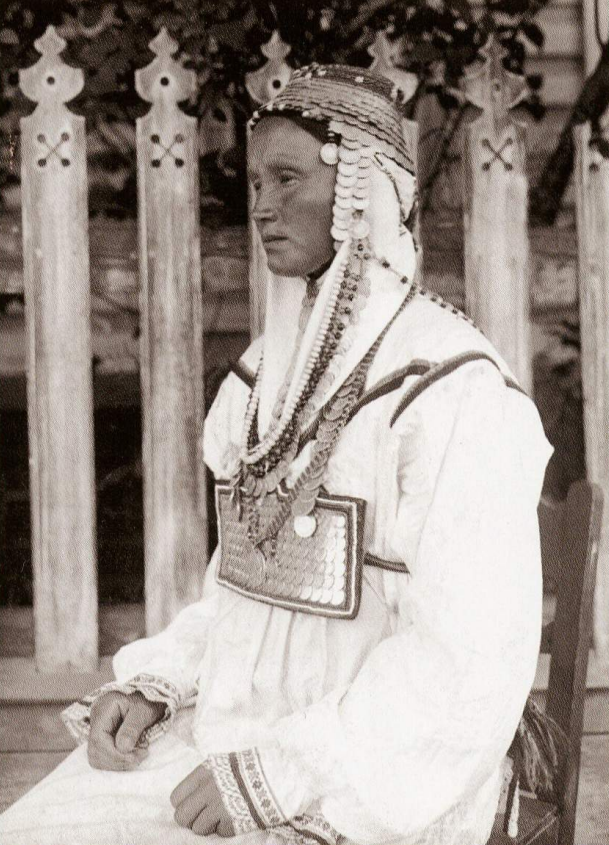

Regions with significant populations
- Russia, Chuvashia

Languages
- Chuvash

Religion
- Russian Orthodox, Chuvash Paganism

Related ethnic groups
- Anatri, Virjal, Volga Tatars

=== Traditional dress ===
It is believed that the traditional clothing of the middle-lower Chuvash has preserved the most ancient look, in contrast to the other Chuvash Sub groups who were influenced by other peoples (Viryal- Finno-Ugric, Anatri- the influence of the Tatars ).
