= Maurice Yaklashkin =

- Born: August 4, 1947 (age 77) vil. Chuteevo, Yantikovsky District, Chuvash ASSR, USSR
- Origin: Soviet Union, Russia
- Occupation(s): music teacher, conductor

Maurice Nikolaevich Yaklashkin (Russian: Мори́с Никола́евич Якла́шкин; born on August 4, 1947,. village Chuteevo of the Yantikovsky District of the Chuvash ASSR) is a choral, opera and symphony conductor, music teacher, People's Artist of Russia, Honored Art Worker of the Chuvash ASSR, professor. Now he is the artistic director and chief conductor of the Chuvash State Symphony Capella.

== Biography ==
Maurice Yaklashkin born on August 4, 1947, in the village Chuteevo of the Yantikovsky District of the Chuvash ASSR (RSFSR/USSR). In 1966 he graduated from the music department Kanash pedagogic college school. In 1982 he graduated from the Gorky State Conservatory.
