= Arkady Malov =

Arkady Vasilyevich Malov (Chuvash and Russian: Аркадий Васильевич Малов; 28 April 1928 in Bolshiye Toktashi village, Alikovsky District, Chuvash Republic – 25 April 1995 in Cheboksary) was a Chuvash poet and translator.

== Biography ==
Arkady Malov was born on 28 April 1928 in Bolshiye Toktashi village, Alikovsky District of the Chuvashia.

Arkady Malov studied in Hodar middle school in the Shumerlinsky District, and in pedagogic department of the Chuvash State University.

Malov worked as an editor of Chuvash State book publishing house, as secretary of Chuvash magazine «Ялав» (Flag), and as chief-editor of the Chuvash literature magazine «Тӑван Атӑл» (Native Atal).

Poet died on 25 April 1995 in Cheboksary.

== Well-known works ==
=== Translation ===
- S. Antonov, «Юманай такмакӗсем» (Yumany short songs);
- S. Shlyakhoo, «Ваня юлташ»; (Vanya-friend)
- M. Sholohov, «Лӑпкӑ Тан (Дон)» (Quiet Don);
- I. Kazakevich, «Кӑвак тетрадь» (Blue notebook).
- L. Tolstoy, «Вӑрҫӑпа лӑпкӑлӑх» (War and peace).
