= State Anthem of Chuvashia =

Чӑваш Республикин патшалӑх гимнӗ
English: State Anthem of the Chuvash Republic
- Emblem of the Republic of Chuvashia
- Regional anthem of Chuvashia (Russia)
- Lyrics: Ille Tuktash
- Music: German Lebedev
- Adopted: 14 July 1997

Audio sample
- Instrumental recording: file; help

The State Anthem of the Chuvash Republic, (Note: Chuvash: Чӑваш Республикин патшалӑх гимнӗ, romanized: Çăvaş Respublikin patşalăh gimnĕ; Russian: Государственный гимн Чувашской Республики) also referred to as "O Motherland", (Note: Chuvash: Тӑван ҫӗршыв, romanized: Tăvan cĕrşıv; Russian: О Родина, romanized: O Rodina) is the regional anthem of Chuvashia, a republic of Russia. Officially adopted in 1997, the lyrics were written by Ille Tuktash, and the music was composed by German Lebedev.

== History ==
=== Earlier version ===
An idea aroused in 1905 about creating a new universal anthem. At the time, poet Yakov Turkhan wrote poems to the melody of the Russian imperial anthem, and he published them in the first issue of the newspaper Hypar in January 1906.

In 1917, priest Taras Kirillov wrote and composed the poem "Chuvash Folk Song". (Note: Chuvash: Чӑваш халӑх юрри, romanized: Çăvaş halăh yurri; Russian: Чувашская народная песня) Unsuccessful at first, leader of Chuvash choir in Kazan Tikhon Alekseyev created the anthem in 1918 which garnered support by the entire Chuvash intelligencia. A version had a melody based on the "Anthem of Free Russia" composed by Aleksandr Grechaninov, and a subscript translation was preserved.

It was performed in January 1918 (after the end of the Russian Republic) by the Chuvash choir in Kazan after the premiere of the first national play by Maximovich-Koshkinsky, which was based on the play "Live Not as You Would Like To" by Alexander Ostrovsky.

Its popularity increased and it was performed on all significant events. However, it did not acquire an official status at the time.

=== Modern version ===
The modern version was based on the song "O Motherland", written in the mid-20th century by Chuvash poet Ille Tuktash and composed by Honored Artist of the RSFSR German Lebedev.

The composer German Lebedev created it for Pyotr Osipov's play "In His Motherland", which was staged at the Chuvash Academic Theater between 1944 and 1945. After the first performance, the audience was impressed. For the first time, the song acquired its status of an unofficial anthem of Chuvashia on 30 October 1950. Then, in the Hall of Columns of the House of Unions in Moscow, the 30th anniversary of the Chuvash Autonomous Soviet Socialist Republic was celebrated. At this solemn evening, the Chuvash State Song and Dance Ensemble performed a song accompanied by a symphony orchestra.

The song became an official anthem after the adoption on 1 July 1997 by the State Council of the Chuvash Republic of the Law "On State Symbols of the Chuvash Republic", approved and signed by the Head, Nikolay Fyodorov, on 14 July 1997.

April 29 is a holiday in the Chuvash Republic, which celebrates the day of state symbols of the republic (anthem, emblem and flag – all of which have been celebrated since 2004). It was introduced by the Decree of the President of the Chuvash Republic on 8 April 2004, No. 24 "On the Day of State Symbols of the Chuvash Republic", and the Law of the Chuvash Republic on 19 April 2004, No. 1 "On the Day of State Symbols of the Chuvash Republic".

== Lyrics ==
=== Chuvash version ===
Cyrillic script

Ҫурхи тӗнче вӑраннӑ чух,
Хаваслӑ кун шӑраннӑ чух,
Чун савӑнать: чӗре сикет,
Ҫӗршывӑм ҫинчен юрлас килет.

Хушса юрламалли:
𝄆 Тӑван ҫӗршыв, 𝄇
Асран кайми юратнӑ ҫӗршыв.
𝄆 Тӑван ҫӗршыв, 𝄇
Мухтав сана, ҫуралнӑ ҫӗршыв!

Яшсем–херсем вылянӑ чух,
Атте–анне ӑс панӑ чух,
Чун савӑнать, чӗре сикет,
Татах та нумай пурнас килет.

Хушса юрламалли

Тӑвансемпе пӗрлешнӗ чух,
Чӑваш тӗнчи ҫӗкленнӗ чух,
Чун савӑнать: чӗре сикет,
Татах та хастар пулас килет.

Хушса юрламалли

Latin script

Curhi tĕnçe vărannă çuh,
Havaslă kun şărannă çuh,
Çun savănaty: çĕre siket,
Cĕrşıvăm cinçen yurlas kilet.

Huşsa yurlamalli:
𝄆 Tăvan cĕrşıv, 𝄇
Asran kaymi yuratnă cĕrşıv.
𝄆 Tăvan cĕrşıv, 𝄇
Muhtav sana, curalnă cĕrşıv!

Yaşsem–hersem vılyană çuh,
Atte–anne ăs pană çuh,
Çun savănaty, çĕre siket,
Tatah ta numay purnas kilet.

Huşsa yurlamalli

Tăvansempe pĕrleşnĕ çuh,
Çăvaş tĕnçi cĕklennĕ çuh,
Çun savănaty: çĕre siket,
Tatah ta hastar pulas kilet.

Huşsa jurlamalli

IPA transcription (Note: See Help:IPA and Chuvash phonology.)

[ɕʊrʲˈɣʲi tʲɘ̹nʲˈdʑʲɛ ʋə̹.rɐnˈnə̹ tɕux |]
[xɐˈʋas.ɫə̹ kun ʂə̹ˈran.nə̹ tɕux ‖]
[tɕun sɐ.ʋə̹ˈnatʲ | tɕʲɘ̹ˈrʲɛ sʲɪˈɡʲɛtʲ |]
[ɕʲɘ̹rʲˈʂɨ.ʋə̹m ɕʲɪnʲˈdʑʲɛnʲ jʊrˈɫas kʲɪˈlʲɛtʲ ‖]

[xʊʂˈsa jʊr.ɫɐ.mɐlʲˈlʲi]
𝄆 [tə̹ˈʋan ɕʲɘ̹rʲˈʐɨʋ |] 𝄇
[ɐsˈran kɐjˈmʲi | jʊˈrat.nə̹ ɕʲɘ̹rʲˈʐɨʋ ‖]
𝄆 [tə̹ˈʋan ɕʲɘ̹rʲˈʐɨʋ |] 𝄇
[mʊxˈtaʋ sɐˈna | ɕʊˈraɫ.nə̹ ɕʲɘ̹rʲˈʐɨʋ ‖]

[jɐʂˈsʲɛmʲ xʲɪrʲˈzʲɛmʲ | ʋɨlʲˈja.nə̹ tɕux |]
[ɐtʲˈtʲɛ ɐnʲˈnʲɛ | ə̹s ˈpa.nə̹ tɕux ‖]
[tɕun sɐ.ʋə̹ˈnatʲ | tɕʲɘ̹ˈrʲɛ sʲɪˈgʲɛtʲ |]
[tɐˈdax ta nʊˈmaj pʊrˈnas kʲɪˈlʲɛtʲ ‖]

[xʊʂˈsa jʊr.ɫɐ.mɐlʲˈlʲi]

[tə̹.ʋɐnʲ.zʲɪmʲˈpʲɛ | pʲɘ̹rʲˈlʲɛʂʲ.nʲɘ̹ tɕux |]
[tɕə̹ˈʋaʂ tʲɘ̹nʲˈdʑʲi | ɕʲɘ̹kʲˈlʲɛnʲ.nʲɘ̹ tɕux ‖]
[tɕun sɐ.ʋə̹ˈnatʲ | tɕʲɘ̹ˈrʲɛ sʲɪˈgʲɛtʲ |]
[tɐˈdax ta xɐsˈtar pʊˈɫas kʲɪˈlʲɛtʲ ‖]

[xʊʂˈsa jʊr.ɫɐ.mɐlʲˈlʲi]

=== Russian version ===
Cyrillic script

Когда весны высокий свод,
Лучи живые щедро льёт, —
На добрый лад судьбу верша,
О крае родном поёт душа.

Припев:
𝄆 Поклон тебе, о Родина, 𝄇
Красавица на все времена.
𝄆 Поклон тебе, о Родина, 𝄇
Да славится родная страна!

Отцам на смену выйдя в путь,
Ты, юность, им опорой будь.
На добрый лад судьбу верша,
О жизни большой поёт душа.

Припев

Народ народу — друг и брат,
Отныне и чуваш крылат,
На добрый лад судьбу верша,
О силе людской поёт душа.

Припев

Latin script

Kogda vesny vysokij svod,
Luči živyje ščedro liot, —
Na dobryj lad sudjbu verša,
O kraje rodnom pojot duša.

Pripev:
𝄆 Poklon tebe, o Rodina, 𝄇
Krasavica na vse vremena.
𝄆 Poklon tebe, o Rodina, 𝄇
Da slavitsja rodnaja strana!

Otcam na smenu vyjdja v putj,
Ty, junostj, im oporoj budj.
Na dobryj lad sudjbu verša,
O žizni boljšoj pojot duša.

Pripev

Narod narodu — drug i brat,
Otnyne i čuvaš krylat,
Na dobryj lad sudjbu verša,
O sile ljudskoj pojot duša.

Pripev

IPA transcription (Note: See Help:IPA/Russian and Russian phonology.)

[kɐˈgda vʲɪˈsnɨ vɨˈso.kʲɪj svot |]
[ɫʊˈtɕi ʐɨˈvɨ.jɛ ˈɕːɛ.drɐ lʲjɵt ‖]
[na ˈdo.brɨj ɫat sʊdʲˈbu ˈvʲɛr.ʂɐ |]
[o ˈkra.jɛ rɐˈdnom pɐˈjɵd‿dʊˈʂa ‖]

[prʲɪˈpʲɛf]
𝄆 [pɐˈkɫon tʲɪˈbʲɛ | o ˈro.dʲɪ.nɐ |] 𝄇
[krɐˈsa.vʲɪ.tsɐ | na fsʲɛ vrʲɪ.mʲɪˈna ‖]
𝄆 [pɐˈkɫon tʲɪˈbʲɛ | o ˈro.dʲɪ.nɐ |] 𝄇
[da ˈsɫa.vʲɪ.tsɐ | rɐˈdna.jɐ strɐˈna ‖]

[ɐtˈtsam na ˈsmʲɛ.nʊ ˈvɨj.dʲɐ f‿putʲ |]
[tɨ ˈju.nɐsʲtʲ‿im ɐˈpo.rɐj butʲ ‖]
[na ˈdo.brɨj ɫat sʊdʲˈbu ˈvʲɛr.ʂɐ |]
[o ˈʐɨ.zʲnʲɪ bɐlʲˈʂoj pɐˈjɵd‿dʊˈʂa ‖]

[prʲɪˈpʲɛf]

[nɐˈrot nɐˈro.dʊ drug‿i brat |]
[ɐˈtnɨ.nʲɛ i tɕʊˈvaʂ krɨˈɫat ‖]
[na ˈdo.brɨj ɫat sʊdʲˈbu ˈvʲɛr.ʂɐ |]
[o ˈsʲi.lʲɛ lʲʊtˈskoj pɐˈjɵd‿dʊˈʂa ‖]

[prʲɪˈpʲɛf]

=== English translation ===
I
When springtime world awakens
When trills of jolly day are heard
My soul rejoices, my heart beats
I want to sing about my country.

Chorus:
𝄆 Oh motherland, 𝄇
The unforgettable beloved motherland.
𝄆 Oh motherland, 𝄇
Praise be to you, my native land!

II
When the young have fun,
When parents admonish.
My soul rejoices, my heart beats,
I want to sing about my country.

Chorus

III
When relatives come together,
And when the Chuvash world rises,
My soul rejoices, my heart beats,
I want to sing about my country.

Chorus
