= Anatri =

Lower Chuvash Anatri
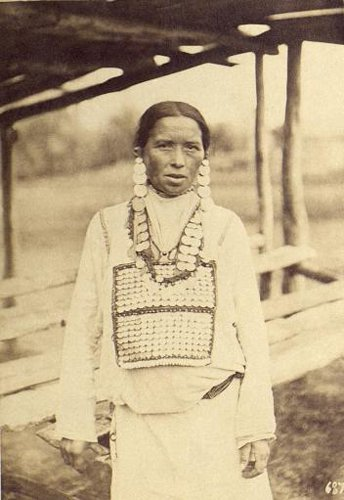

Total population
- approx. 750000

Regions with significant populations
- Russia, Chuvashia, Tatarstan, Ulyanovsk Oblast

Languages
- Lower Chuvash, Chuvash

Religion
- Russian Orthodox, Chuvash Paganism

Related ethnic groups
- Chuvash people, Anat jenchi, Virjal

Anatri (Chuvash: анат [anat] — lower, east) — a part of Chuvash people. Denomination "Anatri", i. e. lower, living downstream of Volga River, is opposed to Virjal or Viryal (Chuvash: вир [vir] — upper, west and Chuvash: ял [yal] — village, community), i. e. Upper Chuvash, living upstream of Volga River.

Ethnographers distinguish 3 subgroups: northern (between the Anish and Uryum rivers); underwood (подлесная in Russian) or western (between the rivers of Bolshaya Bula and Karla); southern or steppe (khirti in Chuvash) (interfluve of Kubnya and Karla)

== Traditional dress ==
The girl's costume is based on the chemise, with the addition of an apron, ornaments hanging from the sash, neck and shoulder, and a helmet shaped headdress covered in beads and coins, which is called a tukhya. This is a very ancient Turkic custom. Similar headdresses can be found amongst a variety of other Turkic peoples in central Asia. This headdress may be connected with the very old Turkic legend of the Princess Gulaim and her forty maiden warriors, known as the Kirk Kiz. The chemise was often decorated with a chest ornamentation known as keske. The ornamentation on chuvash traditional dress is always asymmetrical.

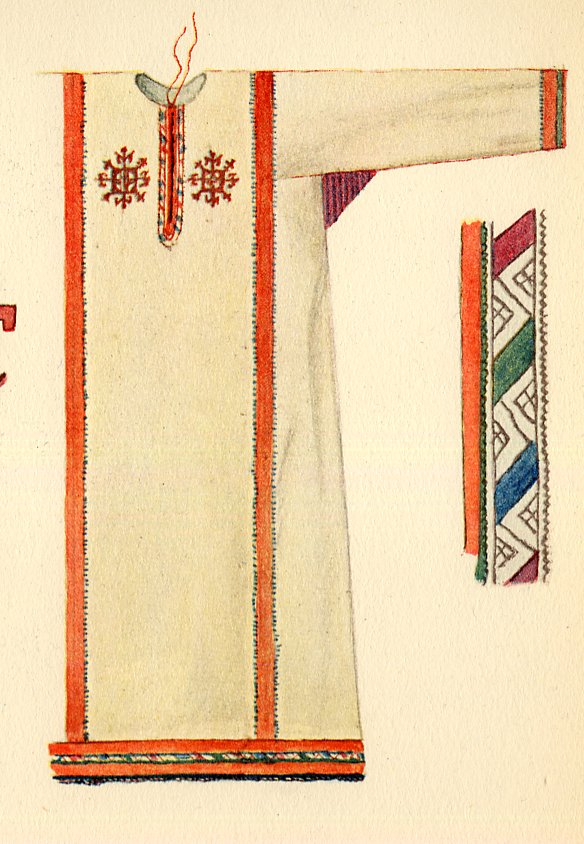
An illustration of a Chuvash chemise by Max Tilke showing the Keske.

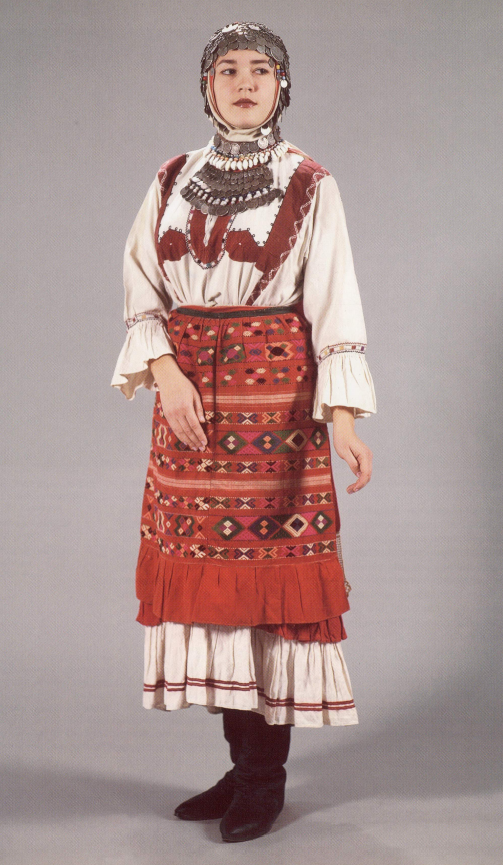
Costume of a married woman. Underwood subgroup. Late 19th century.

The men's costume is much more simple. It consists of a shirt, a woven belt, linen or wool trousers, and footwear. The men's shirt opens on the right side as opposed to the Russian men's shirt which opens on the left.
