= Church of the Nativity of the Virgin (Raskildino) =

Church in Chuvash Republic, Russia

Coordinates: 55°41′24″N 46°33′46″E

- Interactive map of the Church of the Nativity of the Virgin area

General information
- Location: Raskildino, Alikovsky District, Chuvashia, Russia
- Construction started: 1700

Raskildin's Church of Birth of the Virgin Mary is a Russian Orthodox church of the Cheboksary-Chuvash diocese. It is located in the village of Raskildino in the Alikovsky District, Chuvashia.

== History ==
According to a record made in 1875 by a priest of the church N. Rusanovsky in the church's history archive (f. 455, 1,29 № 2316), Raskildino parish had existed from the first half of the 18th century. This is based on the Decree of Empress Anna Ioannovna dated 13 October 1734 that announced soldiers recruitment and contained a requirement for it to be read by all parishioners. Also, signatures on the church books transferred to the Roskildino Church by the order of the bishop of Nizhny Novgorod testify to the existence of Raskildino church in those years.

Sergey Dmitrievich Kopropokov, an inhabitant of Raskildino village and the deacon of the Raskildin's church in 1945–1956, writes:

"In the beginning of 18th century under the decree of the Nizhniy Novgorod diocese and in honor of Birth of the Virgin Mary there came superintendents from a Nizhny Novgorod diocese and Yadrinsky District to the village of Bol'shaya Vyla with a purpose of constructing a church. But inhabitants of the village were not welcoming towards the visitors. There was a big skirmish between the inhabitants and visitors from a diocese and the district. Inhabitants of the village had refused construction of an orthodox church in the village:«We will live by old customs. We do not need an orthodox church. We will not allow building of an orthodox church in our village», — so firmly the inhabitants of the village held the ground. After such quarrel visitors from the Nizhny Novgorod diocese and Yadrinsky District have arrived to Uraskildino. Inhabitants of village have without doubting agreed to the building of an orthodox church. Inhabitants of Raskildino, Ohverkino, Big Toktash, Shandrash, Turi-Vyla villages and also inhabitants of Big Vyla, Sherashevo and Sirikkasy had helped the church building."

According to the legends of Sergey Alitsev, Raskildin's church parish came into existence around 300 years ago. In 1778, instead of the burned-down church, parishioners constructed a new church of wood with a stone base. Construction on a new, completely stone temple began in 1895, and in 1902 it was completed. In 1909, a stone chapel was added to the church.

On August 8, 1941, it was officially decided that the church was to be closed. Nearly four years later, in April 1945, the church was re-opened, and the regular services were restored.

== See also ==
- Church of the Assumption of the Virgin (Alikovo)
