= Ille Toktash =

Soviet Chuvash writer and poet

Ille Tuktash
- Born: Ilya Semyonov; 29 July 1907; Bolshiye Toktashi village, Russian Empire
- Died: 20 January 1957 (aged 49); Cheboksary, Chuvashia, USSR
- Occupations: Writer; poet; folklorist
- Writing career
- Language: Chuvash, Russian
- Period: 1932–1957
- Notable works: Verses (1930); First victory (1932)

Ilya Semyonovich Tuktash (Russian: Илья Семёнович Тукташ), known in his native language as İlle Tuktaş (Chuvash: Илле Тукташ), was a Soviet Chuvash writer and poet. He was a member of the USSR Union of Writers.

== Early life ==
Ille Tuktash was born in 1907 in the village of Bolshiye Toktashi, in the Alikovsky District of the Chuvash Republic. He graduated from Alikovo Middle School.

== Career ==
He was a reporter between 1942 and 1944.

He was the author of the collections Verses (1930) and The Wind of the October (1932), as well as short stories and essays. His novella Bull Ravine (1932) dealt with the collectivization of Chuvash villages. Tuktash translated into Chuvash The Tale of Igor's Campaign (with I. Ivnik), M. A. Sholokhov's The Quiet Don (book 1), and the short stories of M. Gorky. He is known as a compiler of Chuvash folklore.

Ille died on 20 January 1957 in Cheboksary.

Tuktash created a genre of lyrical poetry including "Grow, Motherland, Strengthen" (Ӳс, ҫӗршыв, хӑватлан, Us, sjörskyv, håvatlan), "White Pigeon" (Шурӑ кӑвакарчӑн, Skorå kåvakartjån), and "O Motherland" (Тӑван ҫӗршыв, Tåvan sjörskyv).

== Works ==
- «Сӑвӑсем» – Verses (1930)
- «Пӗрремӗш ҫӗнтерӳ» – First victory (1932)
- «Октябрь» – October
- «Вӑкӑр ҫырми» – Bull's ravine (1933)
- «Чечек ҫыххи» – Bunch of flowers (1939)
- «Павел Лаптев» – Pavel Laptev (1944)
- «Ҫӗр хуҫисем» – Terra owners (1954)
- «Сӑвӑсемпе юрӑсем» – Verses and Songs (1958).

== Literature ==
- Iur’ev, M. Pisateli sovetskoi Chuvashii. Cheboksary, 1975.
- Efimov L. I., "Элӗк Енӗ" (Alikovo District), Alikovo, 1994.
- "Аликовская энциклопедия", editing: Efimov L. I., Efimov E. L., Anan'ev A. A., Terernt'ev G. K., Cheboksary, 2009, ISBN 978-5-7670-1630-3.
- "Чӑваш литературин антологийӗ", editing: Gordeev D. V., Silem J. A. Cheboksary, 2003. ISBN 5-7670-1279-2 .
