= Alikovo District Literary and Local Lore Museum =

Museum in the Chuvash, Russia

Alikovo Regional Literary and Local Lore Museum
- Аликовский районный литературно-краеведческий музей
- Established: 1995
- Location: Chuvashia, Russia
- Coordinates: 55°44′09″N 46°44′08″E
- Type: literary&local lore
- Director: Alekseeva O. E.
- Website: (in Russian) http://gov.cap.ru/?gov_id=865

The Alikovo Regional Literary and Local Lore Museum is a historical and literary Museum of The Alikovsky District of the Chuvash Republic.

== History ==
The museum was opened in 1995 in honor of the 300th anniversary of the village of Alikovo. Many work in the opening of the Museum was invested by Guriy Konstantinovich Terentev, Valerian Stepanov and others.

== Structure ==
The Museum presents monuments of material and spiritual culture of riding Chuvash. The exhibitions of books and exhibits devoted to the life and work of I. Yakovlev, the legendary hero of the civil war V. I. Chapaev, the heroes of the great Patriotic war, as well as exhibitions of ancient national costumes are especially popular here.

== See also ==
- Valinke - national folklore ensemble
- Virjal shevlisem
- Alikovo Middle School

== Literature ==
- Л. И. Ефимов, «Элĕк Енĕ» (Аликовский край), Аликово, 1994.
- «Аликовская энциклопедия», редколлегия: Ефимов Л. А., Ефимов Е. Л., Ананьев А. А., Терентьев Г. К., Чебоксары, 2009, ISBN 978-5-7670-1630-3.
- «Аликовскому району 75 лет», под ред. Ефимова Л. А., Чебоксары, 2002.
