= Tautovo Rural Settlement =

Coordinates: 55.7052°N 46.6446°E

Tautovo Rural Settlement (Russian: Таутовское се́льское поселе́ние; Chuvash: Тавăт ял тăрăхĕ, Tavăt jal tărăkhĕ) is an administrative and municipal division (a rural settlement) of Alikovsky District of the Chuvash Republic, Russia. It is located in the central part of the district. Its administrative center is the rural locality (a village) of Tautovo. Rural settlement's population: 2,532 (2006 est.).

Tautovo Rural Settlement comprises eleven rural localities.

The Cheboksary–Krasnye Chetai highway crosses the territory of the rural settlement.
