= Alexander Artemiev =

Chuvash poet, prose writer, translator and critic

- Born: Alexander Spiridonovich Artemiev; 14 September 1924; Toore Vyla village, USSR
- Died: 5 August 1998 (aged 73); Cheboksary, Chuvashia, USSR
- Occupations: writer, poet and translator
- Writing career
- Language: Chuvash, Russian
- Notable works: «Юлашки юрӑ» (Final song) (1981) «Салампи» - Salampee(1956, 1960, 1966, 1983)

Alexander Artemiev (Chuvash and Russian: Артемьев Александр Спиридонович; 14 Sept 1924 – 5 August 1998.), was a Chuvash poet, prose writer, translator and critic.

== Biography ==
Artemiev attended secondary school in the Shtanashi village of Chuvashia. He enlisted in the Red Army as a private, and then became a junior commander during the Eastern Front of World War II, as well as for the later Soviet-Japanese War. He was wounded three times during his service, and was awarded many medals.

After demobilization, he worked managing a log hut-reading room in his native village, becoming responsible secretary of magazines "Yalav"(Ялав) and "Tavan Atal". He also participated in distance learning from the Maxim Gorky Literature Institute, studying and publishing poetry. Among his most popular works are: «Ах, пӗлесчӗ» (Ah to know), «Ҫуралнӑ ҫӗршыв» (the Darling party), and «Салампи юрри» (Salampi's song). Alexander Artemyev also translated some of Alexander Pushkin's, Mikhail Lermontov's and Ivan Turgenev's works into the Chuvash language.

== Well-known works ==
- «Суйласа илнисем», икӗ томлӑ, (Selected works, in 2 volumes) 1986);
- «Юлашки юрӑ» (Final song) (1981);
- «Салампи» - Salampee(1956, 1960, 1966, 1983);

== Literature ==
- Efimov L. I., "Элӗк Енӗ" (Alikovo District), Alikovo, 1994.
- "Аликовская энциклопедия", editing: Efimov L. I., Efimov E. L., Anan'ev A. A., Terernt'ev G. K., Cheboksary, 2009, ISBN 978-5-7670-1630-3.
- «Чӑваш литературин антологийӗ», editing: Gordeev D. V., Silem J. A. Cheboksary, 2003. ISBN 5-7670-1279-2 .
- «Литературы народов России: XX в.» Н. С. Надъярных, Moscow Наука, 2005

== Links ==
- Культурное наследие Чувашии
- Александр Артемьева асăнса
