= Alikovo =

Alikovo may refer to:

- Alikovo, Alikovsky District, Chuvash Republic, a village (selo) in Alikovsky District of the Chuvash Republic, Russia
- Alikovo, Krasnochetaysky District, Chuvash Republic, a village in Krasnochetaysky District of the Chuvash Republic, Russia
