= Valinke =

Valinke (Russian: Валинке) is a national folklore ensemble of Virjal Chuvashs of Alikovsky District of the Chuvash Republic. It conists of about 50 masters of national art creativity.

The leader is Lydia Vasilevna Filippova, the director of Alikovsky palace of culture.

The creative collective of the Chuvash song and dance includes three age groups: seniors, adult and children. The encemble includes teachers, schoolboys, doctors, retired people and art workers.

Performers use traditional costumes and musical instruments, such aspalnai, nai, khupkhu, tutut, caval and parappan.

Their repertoire includes "Snowdrops" (Çеçпĕлсем) lullabies, game songs, dances, chastooshkas and fairy tales. They also participate in ceremonies and on holidays. The children's group has received awards at festivals «Черчен чечексем» («Beauty flowers») and «Пĕчĕк çеç путене» ("Perepelochka").

== History ==
From 1995 to 2001, Alina Afanaseva, graduate of folklore branch of Cheboksary musical school, supervised. The same year "Valinke" participated in "Between Volga and Don" festival.

In 2000 Valinke showed their skills at the Festival of Chuvash culture in the Orenburg region.

In 2006–2008 the group performed in Moscow, Volgograd, Saratov, Kirov, Bogorodsk (Nizhniy Novgorod region), Bashkortostan and Tatarstan.

On June 25–27, 2010 Valinke went to the village Lyuk of the Zavyalovsky District of the Udmurt Republic (native land of ethnographologist and folklorist D.K. Zelenin) for participation in the 5th Interregional folklore festival «A window in the sky».

In 2011 the group visited a holiday of "Чӳклеме" (Immolation) at the invitation of the Chuvash national-cultural autonomy of Krasnoyarsk Region. They also gave concerts in Tyumen and Ekaterinburg.

== Achievements ==
- Received diploma of the 2nd degree, 5th All-Russia festival of folklore collectives: "Crystal key", August 2008, Bogorodsk (Nizhny Novgorod Region).
- Took part in many festivals — «Springs of Russia», «Between Sura and Tsivil», «Ancient patterns», also in republican "Akatuy"
- Receives guests of annually conducted Interregional festival of the Chuvash variety music Virjyal the shevlisy.
- The children's group earned festival awards at «Черчен чечексем» («Flowers of Chuvashiya») and ««Пĕчĕк çеç путене»» ("Perepelochka").

== See also ==
- Virjal shevlisem
- On the life’s way
- Alikovo Middle School

== Literature ==
- "Аликовская энциклопедия", educated: Ефимов Л.А., Ефимов Е.Л., Ананьев А. А., Терентьев Г. К., Cheboksary, 2009, ISBN 978-5-7670-1630-3.
