= Gennady Volkov (educator) =

Chuvash educator, writer and publicist

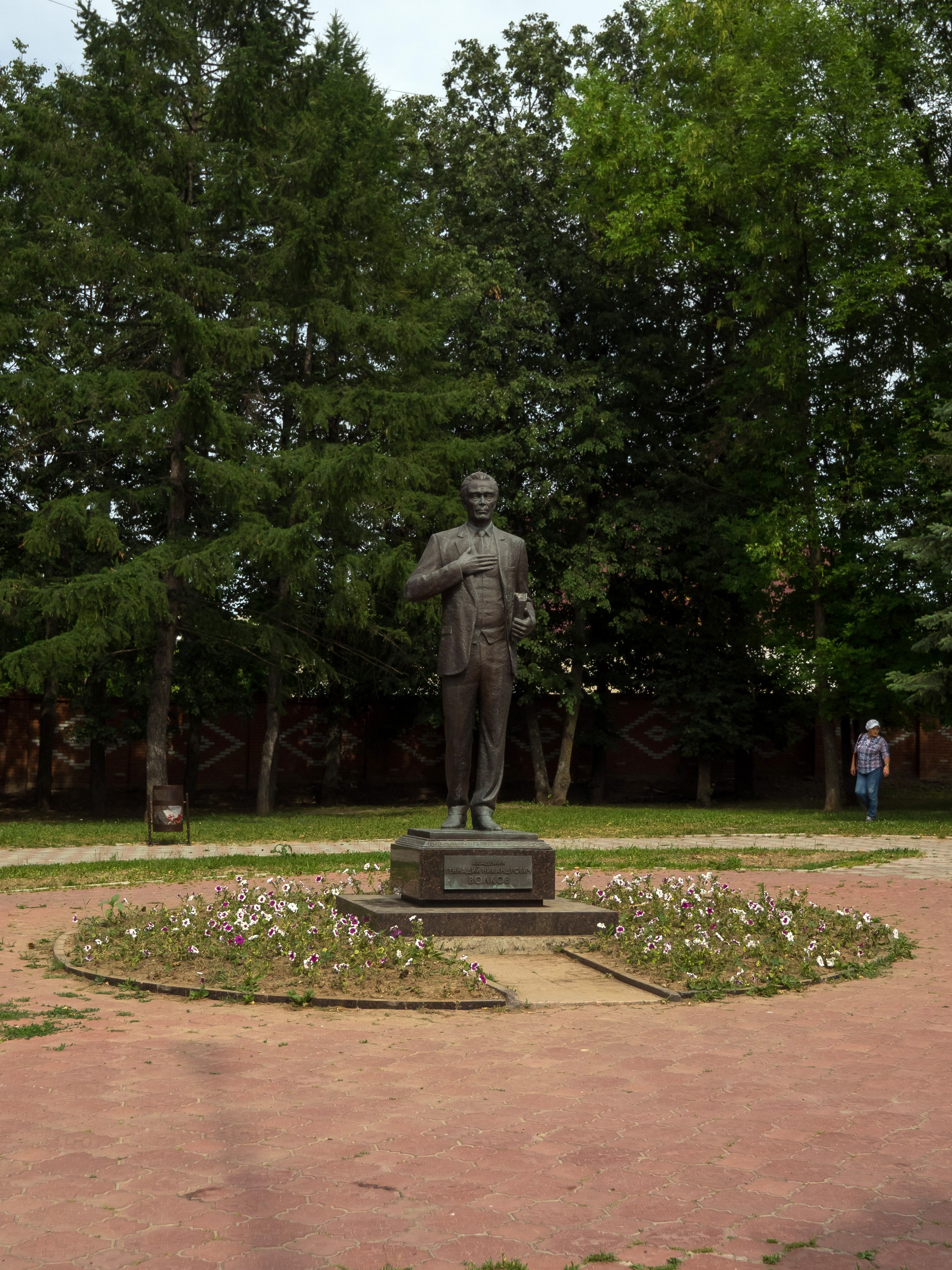
- Born: 31 October 1927 Large Yalchik vil., Yalchiksky District, Chuvash ASSR, RSFSR, USSR
- Died: 27 December 2010 (aged 83) Cheboksary, Chuvash Republic, Russian Federation
- Occupation: Educator
- Language: Chuvash, Russian
- Citizenship: USSR
- Subject: Education, pedagogy, writer, translator

Gennady Nikandrovich Volkov (31 October 1927 – 27 December 2010) was a Chuvash educator, writer and publicist. He was a professor, doctor of pedagogical sciences, and was an academic of the Russian Academy of Education. He founded ethnopedagogics.

== Early life ==
Volkov was born in the Big Yalchik village of the Yalchiksky District in the Chuvash Autonomous Soviet Socialist Republic. His father worked as a schoolteacher.

He graduated in Physics and Mathematics at Chuvash State Pedagogical Institute and the graduate school of the Kazan State Pedagogical Institute.

== Career ==
From 1952 to 1972, he worked as a senior lecturer and associate professor. He started the Department of Pedagogy and Psychology as a senior fellow and vice-rector for scientific work at the Chuvash State Pedagogical Institute.

From 1971 on, he worked in Moscow. He created the Ethnopedagogics Laboratory of the Institute of Family and Education of the Russian Academy of Education, and worked there for many years. From 1979 to 1982, he worked as a professor at Erfurt Higher Pedagogical School (Erfurt, GDR).

== Personal life ==
He died on 27 December 2010, in Cheboksary (Chuvashia). A monument to him was raised at 35 Lenin Prospect, Cheboksary, Chuvash Republic.

== Publications ==
- Волков Г. Н., Егоров В.Н. Чувашская народная педагогика: Очерки. – Cheboksary: Чувашгосиздат, 1958. – 244 с.
- Volkov G. N., Нравственное воспитание учащихся IV-VIII классов сельской национальной школы : Пособие для учителя. – М.: НИИ нац. шк., 1986. – 102 с.
- Volkov G. N., Педагогика жизни. – Cheboksary: Чуваш. кн. изд-во, 1989. – 334 с. – ISBN 5-7670-0217-7.
- Volkov G. N., Судьба патриарха : Роман-эссе. – Cheboksary: Чуваш. кн. изд-во, 1998. – 349 с. – ISBN 5-7670-1054-4.
- Volkov G. N., Этнопедагогика : Учеб. для студентов сред. и высш. пед. учеб. зав.. – Moscow: Academia, 2000. – 168 с. – ISBN 5-7695-0413-7.
- Volkov G. N., Педагогика любви : Избр. этнопед. соч. : [В 2 т.] / Сост. М. Н. Егоров. – Moscow: Магистр-Пресс, 2002. – Т. 2. – 460 с. – ISBN 5-89317-182-9.
- Volkov G. N., Педагогика любви : Избр. этнопед. соч. : [В 2 т.] / Сост. М. Н. Егоров. – Moscow: Magistr-Press, 2002. – Т. 1. – 456 с. – ISBN 5-89317-181-0.
