= Chuvash State Opera and Ballet Theater =

Opera house in Cheboksary, Chuvashia, Russia

Coordinates: 56°08′40.2″N 47°14′13.9″E

Chuvash State Opera and Ballet Theatre
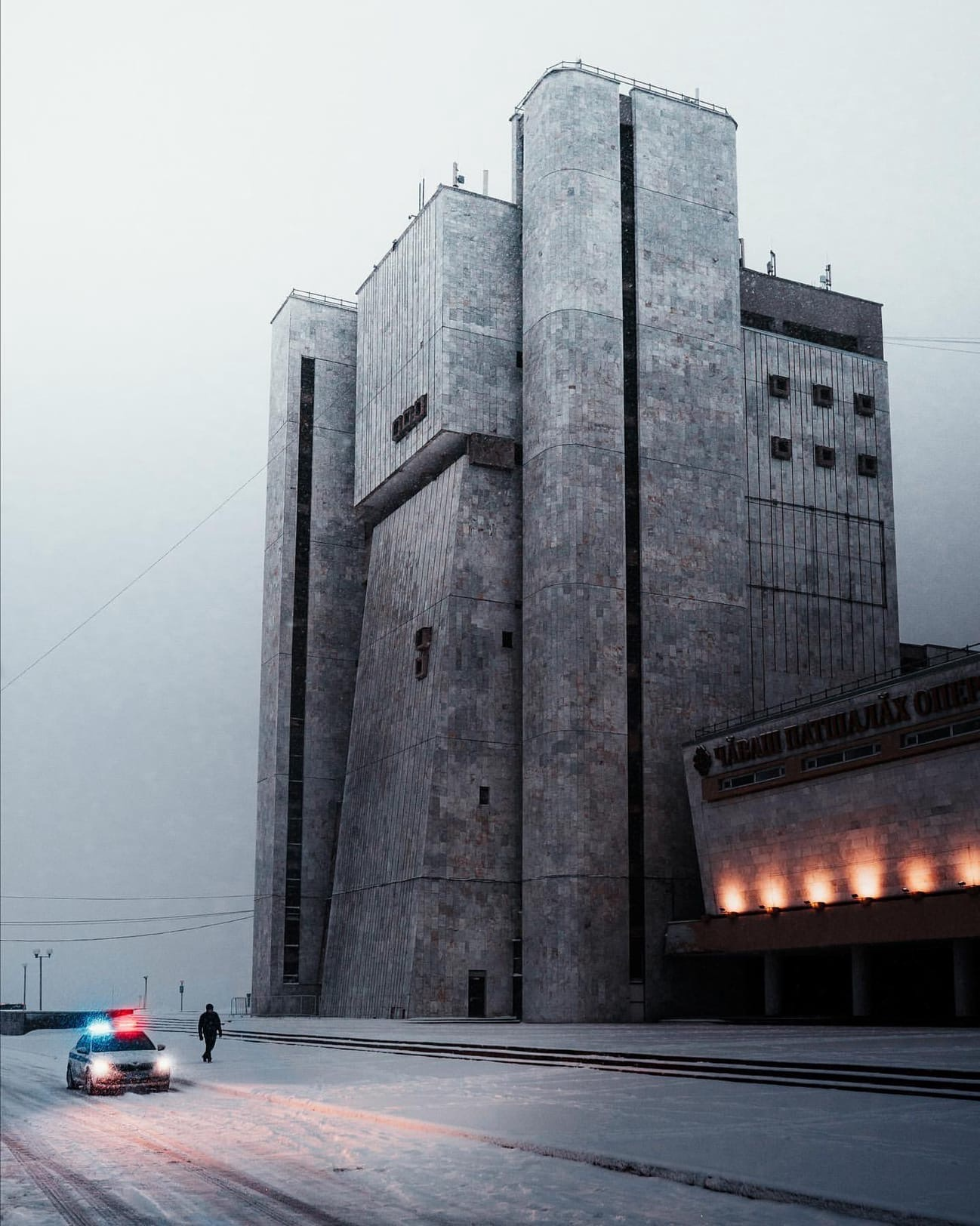
- Interactive map of Chuvash State Opera and Ballet Theatre
- Address: 1, Moscow prospect Cheboksary; Chuvash Republic, Russia

Construction
- Opened: May 22, 1960
- Years active: 1960-present

Website
- volgaopera.ru

The Chuvash State Opera and Ballet Theater or 'Volga Opera (Russian: Чувашский государственный театр оперы и балета, Chuvash: Чӑваш патшалӑх оперӑпа балет театрӗ) is an opera and ballet theater in Cheboksary, Chuvashia (Russia). Initially, it was known as the Chuvash Musical Theater, but was given its present name in 1993.

The yearly International Opera Festival named after Maxim Mikhailov held in the theater since 1991, the International Ballet Festival organized in 1997, the International Competition of Young Opera Singers named after Maxim Mikhailov held for the first time in 2010, and the Festival of Operetta organized in 2010 have become part of the cultural heritage of Chuvashia.

== History ==
The theater was opened in May 22, 1960 in the Soviet Union with the first opera being Water Mill (Chuvash: Шывармань, romanized: Shyvarman) by F. Vasilev. The founder and first director of the theater was Boris Markov.

The current theater building was built in 1985 in brutalism style. It was designed by architects R. Begunts and V. Teneta.

== Administration ==
=== Ballet ===
The company has artists from Yoshkar-Ola, St. Petersburg and other cities.

== See also ==
- Chuvash State Drama Theater
- Chuvash State Puppet Theater
- Chuvash State Symphony Capella
