= Alikovo Middle School =

Coordinates: 55.73945°N 46.74819°E

Alikovo Middle School

Name

Alikovo Middle School

Address

Alikovo, Alikovsky District, (Chuvashia) Chuvash Republic, (Russia) Russian Federation

Established

1853

Community

Suburban

Type

Public

Students

723

Grades

5 to 9

Director

Vladislav K. Volkov

Website

Alikovo Middle School

Alikovo Middle School (also known as "Yakovlev's school") is a state middle school that was opened in 1853 in the Alikovsky District of the Chuvash Republic of Russia, where it still stands today. As the alternate name of the education center suggests, Alikovo was founded by Ivan Yakovlev, a celebrated Chuvash educator and author, who is noted for having facilitated experiences of enlightenment.

== History ==
=== In Tsarist period ===
Based on documented evidence, Alikovsky High School was established in 1854. According to the present document archive, the school opened in 1853, in a parish comprising 34 villages, with a population of 3,917 males and 3,983 females, and was built as the School of the Ministry of State Property. In the period from 1854 till 1872, the school had no proper accommodation and was located inside the parish preacher's bath house and later on in the watch building of the village church. Classes taught by the preacher were held 2- 3 times a week at that time.

In 1872, the School of the Ministry of State Property was reorganized as a two-year college of the Ministry of Education. Only after this reorganization, a small, two-storey school building was erected consisting of merely four classrooms. This building burned down after the revolution.

As of September 1, 1888, the school had 34 boys and 7 girls in the first grade and 29 boys in the second grade, total of 70 children (14 Russian boys and 2 Russian girls; and 49 Chuvash boys and 5 Chuvash girls). The students represented the following districts of Yadrinsky county: Alikovsky, Ustinsky, Asakasinsky, Tinsarinsky, Shumatovsky, Norusovsky, Hochashevsky, Baysubakovsky, and Little Yaushsky. Thus, the two-year college served a radius of 30–40 km.

According to the document archive, 29 boys and 4 girls from 11 villages of Alikovsky district attended school in 1886; in other words, only 1 girl for every 529 women and 1 boy for every 27 men attended school. Ivan Yakovlev who was appointed inspector of Chuvash schools for Kazan school district in 1875, while inspecting subordinate schools, found them in an extremely poor condition. Of eight schools, the Ministry of Education awarded only a third of the students (34 of 104) a certificate of graduation of the total issued in 1876; 70 students who had studied for four or five years were considered unworthy of receiving the certificate due to lack of knowledge. Ivan Yakovlev wrote in his report:

These 'students' who were not able to graduate are often somewhat listless, dull. Their answers are insensible. In Churachikskom college there are 10 of such students. The priest and the teacher spoke of them as fools, idiots incapable of comprehensible answers. There is no doubt that these dull students—'fools,' as they were referred to, are the result of a failed teaching. Lest there are teachers who are properly trained to fulfill their professional duties and who know the native language of their students, this phenomenon will be ever present in Chuvash schools

In Alikovsky district, Ivan Yakovlev found the district school in a pitiful condition: the school building was very small, the school garden was insignificant. Due to this reason he sought an erection of a new school building. At the district meeting the farmers received permission to use 0.5 hectares of land for a new school building and garden. It was helped to be built with farmers' donations. For the period of building of a new school, Ivan Yakovlev appointed V.N. Orlov as a new school principal who was characterized as an energetic and capable organizer. A new two-storey school building with a teachers' annex was completed in 1898; it had 6 classrooms (this building remains in good condition and nowadays contains a local lore museum).

As the district inspector of Chuvash schools, Ivan Yakovlevich Yakovlev often visited the Alikovsky school, sat at the final exams and held counsels. An elderly teacher wrote in his memoirs: "His advice and guidance was wise and just." According to the old-time residents of Alikovo, Ivan Yakovlev was sometimes accompanied by Vladimir Lenin's father, I. Ulyanov.

=== During the Soviet period ===
After Great October Socialist Revolution the two-grade Alikovsky college was converted into several different types of schools: primary school, second-level [secondary] school (1918–1921). In the collectivization years the Alikovsky eight-year school was transformed into a school for the kolkhoz [collective farming] youth. It taught young people the principles of socialism; the head of the school was I.I.IVANOV (resident of the village of Urmaevo Alikovsky area). A great contribution to school operation at that time was made, among others, by the teachers A.I. Zolotov, A.T. Trofimov, F.K. Kuzmin, A.I. Osipova and A.F. Semenova.

In 1934 the school was converted into a high school. From that day on, the school has had 76 graduation ceremonies. The school graduates work all over Russia. Hundreds of graduates have been awarded with Russian national orders and medals. Among the students there are scientists, poets, writers, and pilots. Dozens of high school graduates serve as officers of the Armed Forces of the Russian Federation.

In 2006-2007, the School became the winner of the republican and federal contests among Russian educational institutions that implement innovative educational programs. In 2006 the school was first in Chuvashia to start utilizing the school digitization software system called Netschool, introducing digital journals and magazines. In 2008 Alikovsky School won the national contest "Educational Initiative" in the nomination "Managing a modern school".

The Alikovsky High School is now named after Ivan Yakovlevich Yakovlev.

== Notable teachers ==
- Larionov, Nikita L. – Chuvash author

== Notable students ==
- Larionov, Nikita L., Chuvash writer and poet.
- Ille Toktash, Chuvash writer, poet

== See also ==
- Alikovo District Literary and Local Lore Museum
- Valinke - national folklore ensemble
- Virjal shevlisem
