= Alikovo, Alikovsky District, Chuvash Republic =

Alikovo Аликово Элĕк
- Village
- Location within Chuvash Republic Location within Russia
- Coordinates: 55°44′14″N 46°45′02″E
- Country: Russia
- Chuvashia: Alikovsky District
- Population (2010): 2,653
- Time zone: UTC+4 (EET)
  - Summer (DST): UTC+4 (EEST)

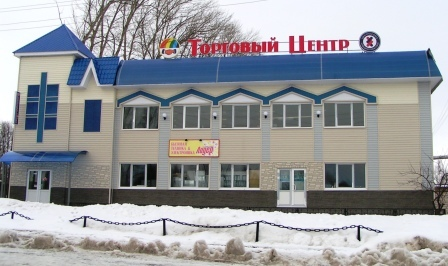
Univermag Alikovo

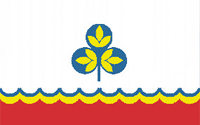
Flag of Alikovo

Coat of Arms of Alikovo

Alikovo (Russian: А́ликово; Chuvash: Элӗк, Elĕk) is a rural locality (a selo) and the administrative center of Alikovsky District of the Chuvash Republic, Russia, located 67 kilometers (42 mi) south of Cheboksary, on the Cheboksary—Krasnye Chetai and Cheboksary—Yadrin auto routes. Population: 2,653 (2010 census); 2,914 (2002 census); 2,689 (1989 Soviet census). The majority of the population is Chuvash.

== Geography ==
The Abashyrma River flows near Alikovo. The closest village is Siner.

== History ==
It was first mentioned in 1486.

== Climate ==
The climate is moderately continental, with long cold winters and warm summers. Average January temperature is −12.9 °C (8.8 °F); average July temperature is +18.3 °C (64.9 °F). The absolute recorded low was −44 °C (−47 °F) and the record high was +37 °C (99 °F). Annual precipitation is up to 552 millimeters (21.7 in).

== Economy ==
Industry in Alikovo is represented by a construction plant, branches of banks and insurance companies, telecommunication offices, and building companies.

== Infrastructure ==
The facilities include a cultural center, a theatre, a library, a health clinic, and stores. There is also a postal office, a stadium, a restaurant and cafés, and several gas stations. A market is open on Thursdays. There is a park and a public garden named after Andriyan Nikolayev.

== Education ==
Educational facilities include a middle school and a music school.

== Culture ==
Cultural facilities include a museum, a people's theater, a people's ensemble, a veteran's orchestra, a school's brass band, and a chorus. International Chuvash music festival "Virjal shevlisem" (lit. Viryal's pancakes) is held each May.

A newspaper is published in Alikovo.

== Religion ==
- Church of the Assumption of the Virgin (Alikovo)
