= Yadrin =

Town in the Chuvash Republic, Russia

Yadrin Ядрин
- Town

Other transcription(s)
  - Chuvash: Етĕрне
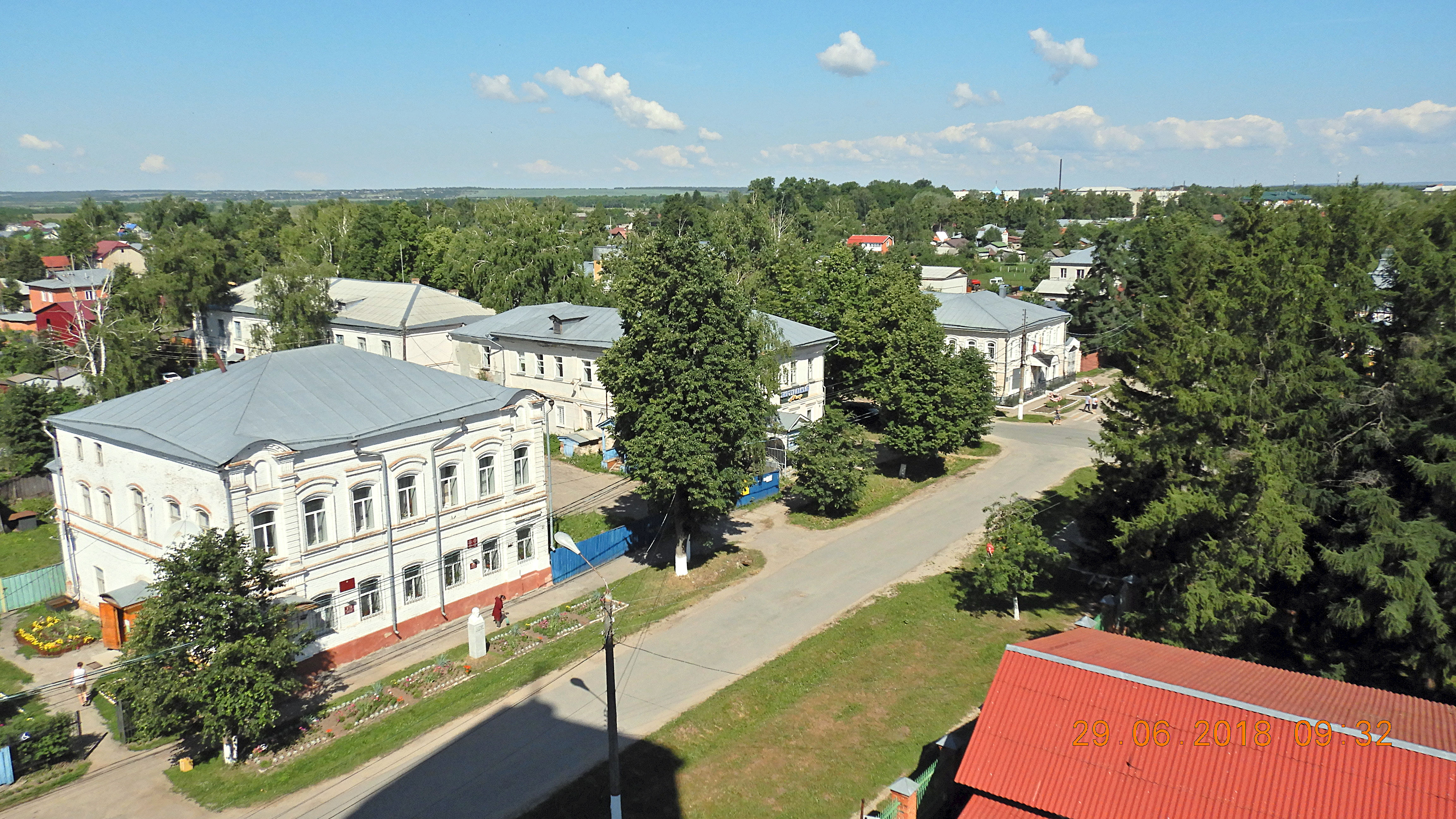
- Yadrin in 2018

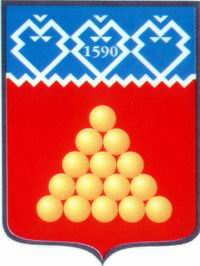
- Coat of arms
- Interactive map of Yadrin
- Location of Yadrin Yadrin (Chuvash Republic)
- Coordinates: 55°56′N 46°12′E
- Country: Russia
- Federal subject: Chuvashia
- Administrative district: Yadrinsky District
- Urban settlementSelsoviet: Yadrinskoye
- Founded: 1590
- Town status since: 1781
- Elevation: 70 m (230 ft)

Population (2010 Census)
  - Total: 9,614
  - Estimate (2021): 7,918 (−17.6%)

Administrative status
  - Capital of: Yadrinsky District, Yadrinskoye Urban Settlement

Municipal status
  - Municipal district: Yadrinsky Municipal District
  - Urban settlement: Yadrinskoye Urban Settlement
  - Capital of: Yadrinsky Municipal District, Yadrinskoye Urban Settlement
- Time zone: UTC+3 (MSK)
- Postal code: 429060
- OKTMO ID: 97653101001

Yadrin (Russian: Я́дрин; Chuvash: Етӗрне, Yetĕrne) is a town and the administrative center of Yadrinsky District of the Chuvash Republic, Russia. Yadrin is located on the left bank of the Sura River, 86 kilometers (53 mi) southwest of Cheboksary, the capital of the republic. Population: 9,614 (2010 census); 10,573 (2002 census); 10,149 (1989 Soviet census).

== History ==
Yadrin was founded in 1590 as a fortified settlement. It was granted town status in 1781. Yadrin is included in the list of historic settled places of the Russian Federation.

== Administrative and municipal status ==
Within the framework of administrative divisions, Yadrin serves as the administrative center of Yadrinsky District. As an administrative division, it is incorporated within Yadrinsky District as Yadrinskoye Urban Settlement. As a municipal division, this administrative unit has urban settlement status and is a part of Yadrinsky Municipal District.

== Demography ==
The Russian Federation Census 2010 reported a resident population for Yadrin of 9,614, a 5% decline from the 1989 census. The population of Yadrin peaked in 1996 at 11,000, and has since declined steadily.

=== Ethnic composition ===
The population of Yadrin consists mainly of the two following ethnic groups; the Chuvash (67%), and ethnic Russians (31%).

== Economy ==
Yadrin has several factories and development bases of the companies of heavy and food industry (e.g., Yadrin machinery plant, Yadrin factory of metal products, YMZ-Energy, Yadrin garment factory, Yadrin meat-packing plant). The town has branches of the following banks: Sberbank of Russia, Rosselkhozbank, Rosgosstrakh Bank.

== Education ==
In Yadrin are 3 schools, a sport school and the Palace children's creativity.

== Culture ==
=== Museums ===
- Yadrin regional arts and local lore Museum;
- The House-museum of artist of the USSR N.D.Mordvinov.

=== Main sights ===
- Holy Trinity Cathedral;
- The Building of The Provincial Assembly;
- The house of the merchant Zheleznov.

=== Notable residents ===
Notable people born in Yadrin include:

- Nikolay Ashmarin, Russian and Soviet linguist, Turkologist;
