= Alikovsky District =

Alikovsky District Аликовский район (Russian)
- District

Other transcription(s)
  - Chuvash: Элӗк районӗ
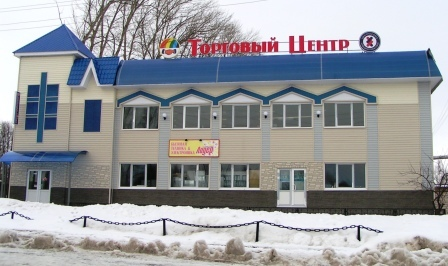
- Shopping center in Alikovo, Alikovsky District

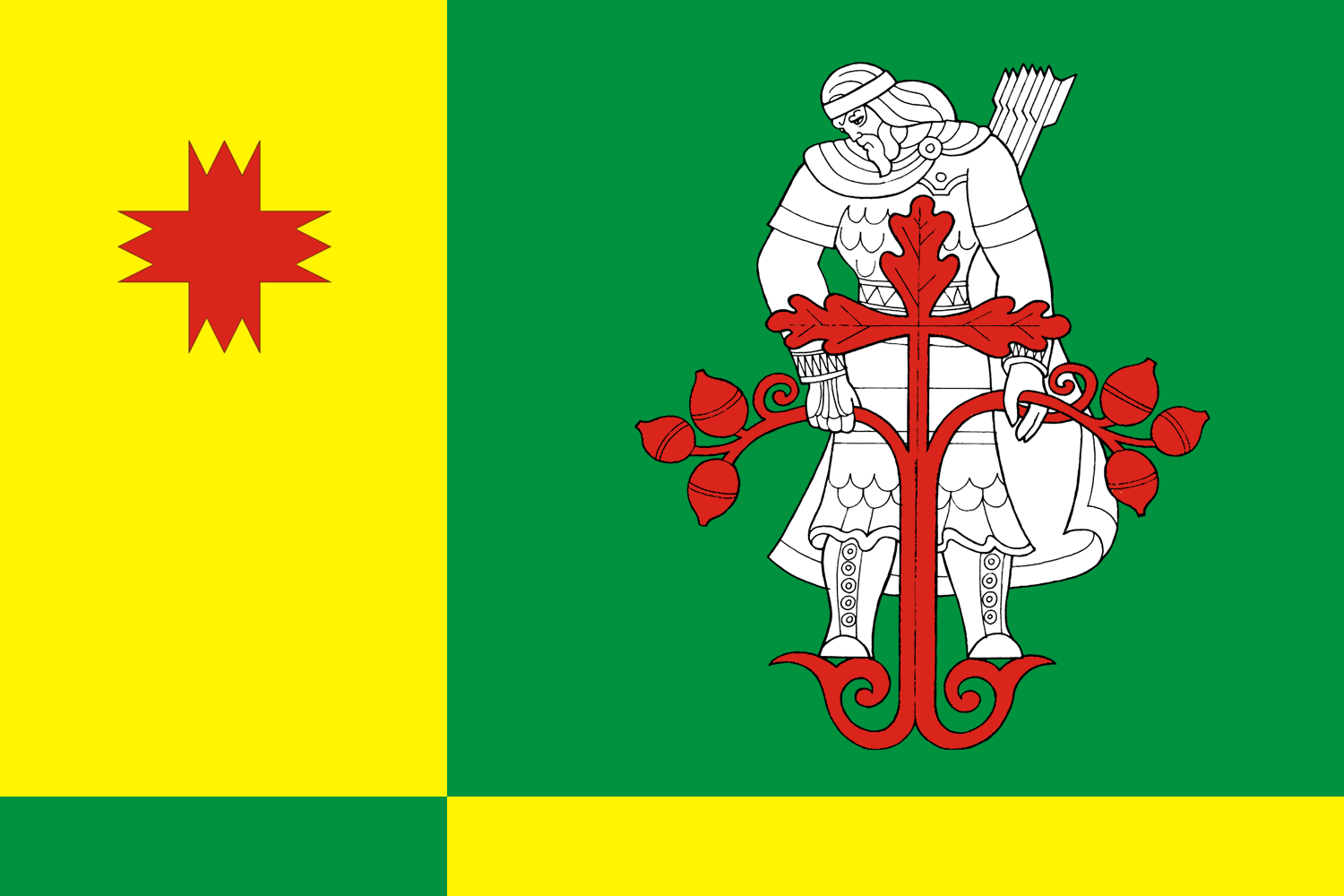
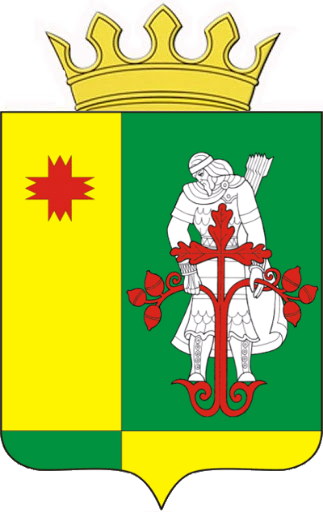
- Flag Coat of arms
- Location of Alikovsky District in the Chuvash Republic
- Coordinates: 55°44′09″N 46°44′08″E
- Country: Russia
- Federal subject: Chuvash Republic
- Established: October 1, 1927
- Administrative center: Alikovo

Area
  - Total: 554.1 km^{2} (213.9 sq mi)

Population (2010 Census)
  - Total: 18,282
  - Density: 32.99/km^{2} (85.45/sq mi)
  - Urban: 0%
  - Rural: 100%

Administrative structure
  - Administrative divisions: 12 rural settlement
  - Inhabited localities: 115 rural localities

Municipal structure
  - Municipally incorporated as: Alikovsky Municipal District
  - Municipal divisions: 0 urban settlements, 12 rural settlements
- Time zone: UTC+3 (MSK)
- OKTMO ID: 97605000
- Website: http://gov.cap.ru/main.asp?govid=57

Alikovsky District (Russian: А́ликовский райо́н; Chuvash: Элӗк районӗ, Elĕk rayonĕ) is an administrative and municipal district (raion), one of the twenty-one in the Chuvash Republic, Russia. It is located in the northwestern central part of the republic and borders with Morgaushsky and Yadrinsky Districts in the north, Krasnoarmeysky District in the east, Vurnarsky and Shumerlinsky Districts in the south, and with Krasnochetaysky District in the west. The area of the district is 554.1 square kilometers (213.9 sq mi). Its administrative center is the rural locality (a selo) of Alikovo. Population: 18,282 (2010 census); 21,745 (2002 census); 23,575 (1989 Soviet census). The population of Alikovo accounts for 14.5% of the district's total population.

== History ==
The district was formed on October 1, 1927.

== Economy ==
There is a construction plant in Alikovo.

=== Transportation ===
The Cheboksary–Yadrin and the Cheboksary–Krasnye Chetay autoroute cross the territory of the district.

== Demographics ==
As of the 2010 Census, 97.55% of the raion's population was ethnically Chuvash, 1.76% of the population was ethnically Russian, and the remaining 0.69% of the population was from other ethnic groups.

== Education ==
There is a middle school in Alikovo.

== Culture ==
There is the Alikovo District Literary and Local Lore Museum, a people's theater, a folk band, a veteran's orchestra, a school's brass band, and a chorus. Regional Chuvash music festival "Vir'yal shevlisem" (lit. Viryal's pancakes) takes place in May of each year.

== Notable people ==
- Alexander Artemiev, writer and poet
- Anatoly Serep, writer and poet
- Arcady Aris, writer
- Arkady Malov, poet and translator
- Boris Markov, actor, director
- Gerasim Pileš, writer and playwright
- Ille Toktash, writer and poet
- Nikita Larionov, writer and poet
- Nikolai Yut, writer, folklorist, and literature critic
- Stanislav Voronov, artist
