= Anatoly Danilov =

Russian painter

- Born: October 7, 1954 (age 71); Toganash, Chuvash ASSR, Soviet Union
- Education: Chuvash State Pedagogical University
- Occupation: Painter

Anatoly Vassilievich Danilov (Chuvash: Данилов Анатолий Васильевич; born October 7, 1954) is a Chuvash painter and Merited Artist of the Chuvash Republic.

== Life and career ==
Danilov was born in the village of Toganash in the Krasnochetaysky District of Chuvashia.

From 1980 to 1985, he studied in the Painting and Graphic Department of Chuvash State Pedagogical University. In 1990, he became a member of the USSR Painters Union,

== Exhibitions ==
Danilov has participated in regional exhibitions in Cheboksary, Novocheboksarsk, Yoshkar-Ola, Almetyevsk,and Smolensk. He has hosted personal exhibitions in Cheboksary and Yoshkar-Ola.

== Creative works ==
- Summer. August (1985)
- Poet Piter Yajgeer (1997)
- Mother (1998)
- Cheboksary. Old city in winter (1998)

== Sources ==
- Данилов Анатолий Васильевич [Anatoly Vasilyevich Danilov]. Chuvash Encyclopedia (in Russian).
