= 2026 Chuvash legislative election =

Regional legislative election in Russia

- 18–20 September 2026

All 44 seats in the State Council 23 seats needed for a majority
- Turnout: 60.31% ▲4.23 pp
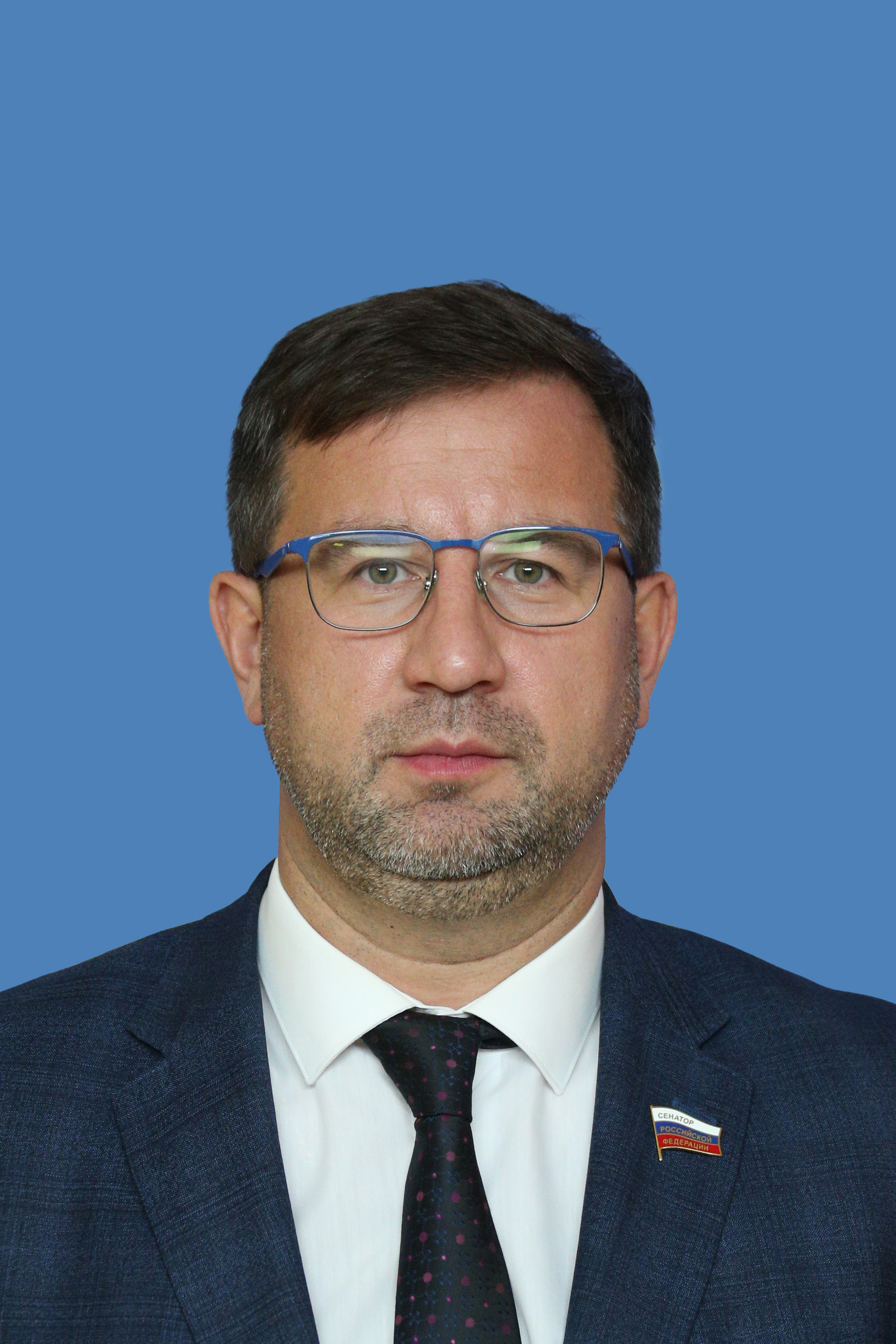

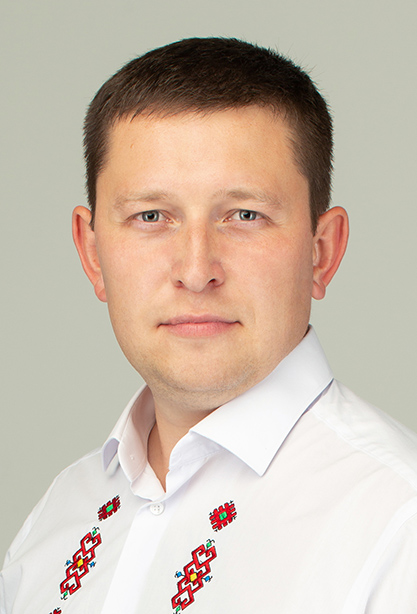
	Majority party	Minority party	Third party
		CPRF	NL
Candidate	Nikolay Vladimirov	Aleksandr Andreyev	Maksim Morozov
Party	United Russia	CPRF	New People
Last election	34.96%, 30 seats	21.35%, 7 seats	5.93%, 1 seat
Seats won	34	4	2
Seat change	▲4	▼3	▲1
Popular vote	269,267	103,765	55,062
Percentage	49.13%	18.93%	10.05%
Swing	▲14.17 pp	▼2.42 pp	▲4.12 pp
	Fourth party	Fifth party	Sixth party
		SR	RPPSS
Candidate	Konstantin Stepanov	Sergey Semyonov	Vladimir Ilyin
Party	LDPR	A Just Russia	Party of Pensioners
Last election	7.06%, 1 seat	15.13%, 4 seats	6.94%, 1 seat
Seats won	1	2	1
Seat change	Steady	▼2	Steady
Popular vote	46,428	34,698	28,168
Percentage	8.47%	6.33%	5.14%
Swing	▲1.41 pp	▼8.80 pp	▼1.80 pp
Chairman before election
Leonid Cherkesov
United Russia
Elected Chairman
Leonid Cherkesov
United Russia
Senator before election
Nikolay Vladimirov
United Russia
Senator after election
Nikolay Vladimirov
United Russia

The 2026 State Council of the Chuvash Republic election took place on 18–20 September 2026, on common election day, coinciding with the 2026 Russian legislative election. All 44 seats in the State Council were up for re-election.

United Russia retained its majority in the State Council, winning 49.1% of the vote and 21 single-mandate constituencies. Communist Party of the Russian Federation lost three out of its seven seats, while support for A Just Russia cratered. A Just Russia more than lost half of its vote share and two seats. New People placed third, winning two party-list seats.

== Electoral system ==
Under current election laws, the State Council is elected for a term of five years, with parallel voting. 22 seats are elected by party-list proportional representation with a 5% electoral threshold, with the other half elected in 22 single-member constituencies by first-past-the-post voting. Seats in the proportional part are allocated using the Imperiali quota, modified to ensure that every party list, which passes the threshold, receives at least one mandate.

== Candidates ==
=== Party lists ===
To register regional lists of candidates, parties need to collect 0.5% of signatures of all registered voters in Chuvashia.

The following parties were relieved from the necessity to collect signatures:

- United Russia
- Communist Party of the Russian Federation
- Liberal Democratic Party of Russia
- A Just Russia
- New People
- Russian Party of Pensioners for Social Justice

№	Party	Territorial groups leaders	Candidates	Territorial groups	Status
1	United Russia	Leonid Cherkesov • Svetlana Kalikova • Nikolay Malov • Nikolay Vladimirov • Stanislav Trofimov • Andrey Makushev • Vladimir Stepanov • Aleksey Ladykov • Alevtina Fyodorova • Larisa Tarasova • Marat Yakushev	44	11	Registered
2	New People	Olga Anoshkina • Yevgeny Ivanov • Elza Kuzmina • Dmitry Kuznetsov • Dimitry Maksimov • Arkady Pavlov • Maksim Morozov • Dmitry Yefimov • Nikolay Kirgizov • Grigory Danilov • Sergey Sakharov	43	11	Registered
3	Party of Pensioners	Natalya Voronkova • Pyotr Vashurin • Aleksandr Abramov • Vladislav Pastukhov • Vladislav Pushkin • Valery Belov • Stanislav Pesin • Vladimir Ilyin • Ilya Talayev • Dmitry Popov • Lilya Romanova	26	11	Registered
4	Communist Party	Andrey Nikitin • Igor Romanov • Svetlana Andreyeva • Nikolay Selivanov • Aleksey Fyodorov • Vladislav Tsapin • Aleksandr Andreyev • Sergey Veryaskin • Aleksandr Filippov	26	9	Registered
5	Liberal Democratic Party	Konstantin Stepanov • Eduard Petrov • Aleksey Sapozhnikov • Nina Sovina • Olga Khristoforova • Yekaterina Bychkova • Daniil Kuzmin	21	7	Registered
6	A Just Russia	Vladimir Ofarinov • Irek Vakhitov • Sergey Semyonov • Yelena Vinogradova • Aleksey Semyonov • Pavel Vyazov • Fyodor Stepanov	28	7	Registered

Communists of Russia, Russian Ecological Party "The Greens" and Rodina, which participated in the last election, did not file, while Civic Platform has been suspended by the court order since April 2026.

=== Single-mandate constituencies ===
22 single-mandate constituencies were formed in Chuvashia. To register candidates in single-mandate constituencies need to collect 3% of signatures of registered voters in the constituency.

Number of candidates in single-mandate constituencies
Party	Candidates	
Party	Nominated	Registered
United Russia	22	22
Communist Party	21	20
A Just Russia	21	20
Liberal Democratic Party	21	21
Party of Pensioners	21	20
New People	22	22
Independent	1	0
Total	129	125

== Results ==
=== Results by party lists ===
Summary of the 18–20 September 2026 State Council of the Chuvash Republic election results
Party	Party list					Constituency		Total	
Party	Votes	%	±pp	Seats	+/–	Seats	+/–	Seats	+/–
United Russia	269,267	49.13	▲14.17	13	▲3	21	▲1	34	▲4
Communist Party	103,765	18.93	▼2.42	4	▼2	0	▼1	4	▼3
New People	55,062	10.05	▲4.12	2	▲1	0	New	2	▲1
Liberal Democratic Party	46,428	8.47	▲1.41	1	Steady	0	Steady	1	Steady
A Just Russia	34,698	6.33	▼8.80	1	▼2	1	Steady	2	▼2
Party of Pensioners	28,168	5.14	▼1.80	1	Steady	0	Steady	1	Steady
Invalid ballots	10,694	1.95	▼1.44	—	—	—	—	—	—
Total	548,082	100.00	—	22	Steady	22	Steady	44	Steady
Turnout	548,082	60.31	▲4.23	—	—	—	—	—	—
Registered voters	908,792	100.00	—	—	—	—	—	—	—

Leonid Cherkesov (United Russia) was re-elected as Chairman of the State Council, while incumbent Senator Nikolay Vladimirov (United Russia) was re-appointed to the Federation Council.

=== Results in single-member constituencies ===
==== District 1 ====
Summary of the 18–20 September 2026 State Council of the Chuvash Republic election in District 1
Candidate	Party	Votes	%
Andrey Marushin	United Russia	11,989	55.55%
Sergey Veryaskin	Communist Party	4,220	19.55%
Olga Anoshkina	New People	1,765	8.18%
Olga Funtikova	A Just Russia	1,461	6.77%
Kirill Antipov	Liberal Democratic Party	986	4.57%
Nikolay Karpov	Party of Pensioners	654	3.03%
Total		21,584	100%

==== District 2 ====
Summary of the 18–20 September 2026 State Council of the Chuvash Republic election in District 2
Candidate	Party	Votes	%
Oleg Meshkov (incumbent)	United Russia	23,917	71.62%
Aleksandr Alyakin	Communist Party	4,090	12.25%
Irek Vakhitov	A Just Russia	2,456	7.35%
Yevgeny Ivanov	New People	1,171	3.51%
Dmitry Korotkov	Liberal Democratic Party	654	1.96%
Pyotr Vashurin	Party of Pensioners	622	1.86%
Total		33,394	100%

==== District 3 ====
Summary of the 18–20 September 2026 State Council of the Chuvash Republic election in District 3
Candidate	Party	Votes	%
Viktor Gorbunov	United Russia	15,200	58.78%
Vladimir Yanvarev	Communist Party	3,155	12.20%
Denis Popkov	A Just Russia	2,682	10.37%
Natalya Voronkova	Party of Pensioners	1,854	7.17%
Nikolay Nemov	New People	1,325	5.12%
Vyacheslav Solovyov	Liberal Democratic Party	1,050	4.06%
Total		25,858	100%

==== District 4 ====
Summary of the 18–20 September 2026 State Council of the Chuvash Republic election in District 4
Candidate	Party	Votes	%
Roman Alekseyev	United Russia	15,941	53.65%
Vyacheslav Alekseyev	Communist Party	6,091	20.50%
Igor Yekhlakov	A Just Russia	2,367	7.97%
Vladimir Chichkanov	New People	1,856	6.25%
Yekaterina Bychkova	Liberal Democratic Party	1,640	5.52%
Olesya Karpova	Party of Pensioners	1,129	3.80%
Total		29,714	100%

==== District 5 ====
Summary of the 18–20 September 2026 State Council of the Chuvash Republic election in District 5
Candidate	Party	Votes	%
Yury Popov (incumbent)	United Russia	25,553	72.09%
Sergey Koptashkin	Communist Party	3,261	9.20%
Aleksandr Abramov	Party of Pensioners	2,387	6.73%
Gennady Dlinov	A Just Russia	1,923	5.42%
Aleksandr Troitsky	New People	1,896	5.35%
Total		35,448	100%

==== District 6 ====
Summary of the 18–20 September 2026 State Council of the Chuvash Republic election in District 6
Candidate	Party	Votes	%
Andrey Vasilyev	United Russia	12,797	46.57%
Ivan Katanayev	Communist Party	4,529	16.48%
Margarita Vanifantyeva	A Just Russia	3,153	11.47%
Elza Kuzmina	New People	2,696	9.81%
Olga Khristoforova	Liberal Democratic Party	1,804	6.56%
Yevgeny Pavlov	Party of Pensioners	1,771	6.44%
Total		27,480	100%

==== District 7 ====
Summary of the 18–20 September 2026 State Council of the Chuvash Republic election in District 7
Candidate	Party	Votes	%
Aleksandr Kuznetsov	United Russia	16,354	54.63%
Ivan Mikhaylov	Communist Party	4,091	13.67%
Yelena Guseva	A Just Russia	3,213	10.73%
Olga Popova	Liberal Democratic Party	1,938	6.47%
Vladimir Lebedev	New People	1,910	6.38%
Vladislav Pastukhov	Party of Pensioners	1,695	5.66%
Total		29,934	100%

==== District 8 ====
Summary of the 18–20 September 2026 State Council of the Chuvash Republic election in District 8
Candidate	Party	Votes	%
Vladimir Sveshnikov (incumbent)	United Russia	15,971	52.00%
Aleksey Zakharov	A Just Russia	4,906	15.97%
Nadezhda Petrova	Liberal Democratic Party	3,219	10.48%
Vladimir Makarov	New People	3,076	10.02%
Grigory Timofeyev	Party of Pensioners	2,593	8.44%
Total		30,713	100%

==== District 9 ====
Summary of the 18–20 September 2026 State Council of the Chuvash Republic election in District 9
Candidate	Party	Votes	%
Nikolay Ugaslov (incumbent)	United Russia	12,253	44.43%
Aleksandr Filippov	Communist Party	6,099	22.12%
Dimitry Maksimov	New People	3,638	13.19%
Vladislav Pushkin	Party of Pensioners	1,993	7.23%
Vladimir Yamangeyev	Liberal Democratic Party	1,579	5.73%
Pyotr Nikiforov	A Just Russia	1,308	4.74%
Total		27,577	100%

==== District 10 ====
Summary of the 18–20 September 2026 State Council of the Chuvash Republic election in District 10
Candidate	Party	Votes	%
Vladimir Viktorov (incumbent)	United Russia	13,754	45.85%
Aleksandr Andreyev	Communist Party	7,617	25.39%
Arkady Pavlov	New People	2,723	9.08%
Luiza Shogulina	A Just Russia	2,034	6.78%
Maksim Glukhov	Liberal Democratic Party	1,673	5.58%
Valery Belov	Party of Pensioners	1,442	4.81%
Total		29,997	100%

==== District 11 ====
Summary of the 18–20 September 2026 State Council of the Chuvash Republic election in District 11
Candidate	Party	Votes	%
Irina Menshikova	United Russia	11,447	43.53%
Aleksey Fyodorov	Communist Party	5,269	20.04%
Dmitry Andreyev	Liberal Democratic Party	3,214	12.22%
Dmitry Kuznetsov	New People	3,132	11.91%
Yelena Vinogradova	A Just Russia	2,426	9.23%
Total		26,297	100%

==== District 12 ====
Summary of the 18–20 September 2026 State Council of the Chuvash Republic election in District 12
Candidate	Party	Votes	%
Sergey Melnikov (incumbent)	United Russia	7,828	35.05%
Svetlana Andreyeva	Communist Party	4,378	19.60%
Konstantin Stepanov	Liberal Democratic Party	3,419	15.31%
Maksim Morozov	New People	3,170	14.19%
Vladimir Medvedev	Party of Pensioners	1,779	7.96%
Pavel Vyazov	A Just Russia	1,262	5.65%
Total		22,336	100%

==== District 13 ====
Summary of the 18–20 September 2026 State Council of the Chuvash Republic election in District 13
Candidate	Party	Votes	%
Dmitry Kudryashov	United Russia	8,291	39.20%
Natalia Vasilyeva	Communist Party	4,715	22.29%
Yekaterina Mulyukova	New People	2,713	12.83%
Kirill Spiridonov	Liberal Democratic Party	2,175	10.28%
Nadezhda Ivanova	A Just Russia	1,826	8.63%
Artyom Drugovskoy	Party of Pensioners	1,012	4.78%
Total		21,153	100%

==== District 14 ====
Summary of the 18–20 September 2026 State Council of the Chuvash Republic election in District 14
Candidate	Party	Votes	%
Sergey Seregin	United Russia	8,097	37.54%
Igor Romanov	Communist Party	5,243	24.31%
Lyubov Samukova	New People	2,945	13.66%
Vladimir Ilyin	Party of Pensioners	2,293	10.63%
Maria Pavlova	Liberal Democratic Party	2,274	10.54%
Total		21,567	100%

==== District 15 ====
Summary of the 18–20 September 2026 State Council of the Chuvash Republic election in District 15
Candidate	Party	Votes	%
Artyom Vladimirov	United Russia	7,844	36.96%
Aleksey Serzhantov	Communist Party	4,198	19.78%
Olga Andreyeva	Liberal Democratic Party	2,739	12.91%
Sergey Vladimirov	New People	2,506	11.81%
Anatoly Alekseyev	Party of Pensioners	1,783	8.40%
Nikolay Kuzmin	A Just Russia	1,506	7.10%
Total		21,224	100%

==== District 16 ====
Summary of the 18–20 September 2026 State Council of the Chuvash Republic election in District 16
Candidate	Party	Votes	%
Yury Zorin	United Russia	6,796	36.56%
Andrey Kazakov	Communist Party	3,925	21.12%
Nikolay Kirgizov	New People	2,143	11.53%
Dmitry Zheltukhin	Liberal Democratic Party	2,057	11.07%
Marina Arnautova	A Just Russia	1,935	10.41%
Stanislav Pesin	Party of Pensioners	1,203	6.47%
Total		18,588	100%

==== District 17 ====
Summary of the 18–20 September 2026 State Council of the Chuvash Republic election in District 17
Candidate	Party	Votes	%
Aleksey Murygin (incumbent)	United Russia	9,149	45.98%
Georgy Stepanov	New People	3,664	18.42%
Valeria Nikolayeva	Liberal Democratic Party	3,276	16.47%
Artyom Zakharov	A Just Russia	3,172	15.94%
Total		19,896	100%

==== District 18 ====
Summary of the 18–20 September 2026 State Council of the Chuvash Republic election in District 18
Candidate	Party	Votes	%
Andrey Aleksandrov (incumbent)	United Russia	9,257	42.74%
Aleksey Yefimov	Communist Party	3,828	17.67%
Vladimir Tkachev	New People	2,513	11.60%
Eduard Petrov	Liberal Democratic Party	2,472	11.41%
Maria Ivanova	A Just Russia	1,657	7.65%
Aleksey Ivantayev	Party of Pensioners	1,373	6.34%
Total		21,661	100%

==== District 19 ====
Summary of the 18–20 September 2026 State Council of the Chuvash Republic election in District 19
Candidate	Party	Votes	%
Andrey Shestakov	United Russia	7,735	40.00%
Dmitry Ivanov	Communist Party	3,327	17.21%
Grigory Danilov	New People	2,521	13.04%
Fyodor Stepanov	A Just Russia	2,489	12.87%
Aleksey Sapozhnikov	Liberal Democratic Party	1,593	8.24%
Dmitry Popov	Party of Pensioners	1,179	6.10%
Total		19,337	100%

==== District 20 ====
Summary of the 18–20 September 2026 State Council of the Chuvash Republic election in District 20
Candidate	Party	Votes	%
Nikolay Nikolayev (incumbent)	United Russia	9,191	47.36%
Boris Maslov	Communist Party	3,844	19.81%
Yevgeny Malyasov	New People	2,897	14.93%
Larisa Gavrilova	Liberal Democratic Party	1,781	9.18%
Olga Grigoryeva	Party of Pensioners	1,203	6.20%
Total		19,405	100%

==== District 21 ====
Summary of the 18–20 September 2026 State Council of the Chuvash Republic election in District 21
Candidate	Party	Votes	%
Sergey Semyonov (incumbent)	A Just Russia	4,931	25.56%
Vladislav Tsapin	Communist Party	4,110	21.30%
Ruslan Nikolayev	United Russia	3,896	20.19%
Aleksey Milovanov	New People	2,249	11.66%
Daniil Kuzmin	Liberal Democratic Party	1,734	8.99%
Lilya Romanova	Party of Pensioners	1,733	8.98%
Total		19,293	100%

==== District 22 ====
Summary of the 18–20 September 2026 State Council of the Chuvash Republic election in District 22
Candidate	Party	Votes	%
Olga Petrova (incumbent)	United Russia	8,717	39.27%
Irina Demidova	Communist Party	4,602	20.73%
Eduard Andreyev	New People	3,464	15.61%
Aleksey Petukhov	A Just Russia	2,142	9.65%
Aleksandr Osipov	Liberal Democratic Party	1,608	7.24%
Sergey Artyushkin	Party of Pensioners	1,061	4.78%
Total		22,197	100%

=== Members ===
Incumbent deputies are highlighted with bold, elected members who declined to take a seat are marked with ~~strikethrough~~.

Constituency
No.	Member	Party
1	Andrey Marushin	United Russia
2	Oleg Meshkov	United Russia
3	Viktor Gorbunov	United Russia
4	Roman Alekseyev	United Russia
5	Yury Popov	United Russia
6	Andrey Vasilyev	United Russia
7	Aleksandr Kuznetsov	United Russia
8	Vladimir Sveshnikov	United Russia
9	Nikolay Ugaslov	United Russia
10	Vladimir Viktorov	United Russia
11	Irina Menshikova	United Russia
12	Sergey Melnikov	United Russia
13	Dmitry Kudryashov	United Russia
14	Sergey Seregin	United Russia
15	Artyom Vladimirov	United Russia
16	Yury Zorin	United Russia
17	Aleksey Murygin	United Russia
18	Andrey Aleksandrov	United Russia
19	Andrey Shestakov	United Russia
20	Nikolay Nikolayev	United Russia
21	Sergey Semyonov	A Just Russia
22	Olga Petrova	United Russia

Party lists
Member	Party
Leonid Cherkesov	United Russia
~~Tatyana Borisova~~	United Russia
~~Albina Varzhina~~	United Russia
~~Ivan Kudyavnin~~	United Russia
~~Tatyana Borisova~~	United Russia
~~Svetlana Kalikova~~	United Russia
Radimir Yegorov	United Russia
Nikolay Malov	United Russia
Nikolay Vladimirov	United Russia
~~Stanislav Trofimov~~	United Russia
Yury Bogdanov	United Russia
~~Andrey Makushev~~	United Russia
Stanislav Shaleyev	United Russia
~~Vladimir Stepanov~~	United Russia
Andrey Karpunin	United Russia
~~Aleksey Ladykov~~	United Russia
~~Dmitry Zakharov~~	United Russia
Aleksey Maklygin	United Russia
~~Alevtina Fyodorova~~	United Russia
Dmitry Arsyutov	United Russia
~~Larisa Tarasova~~	United Russia
Vladislav Krieger	United Russia
~~Marat Yakushev~~	United Russia
Nikolay Urukov	United Russia
Leonid Kuznetsov	United Russia
Pavel Gavrilov	United Russia
Andrey Nikitin	Communist Party
Svetlana Andreyeva	Communist Party
~~Vladislav Tsapin~~	Communist Party
~~Yevgeny Vasilyev~~	Communist Party
Igor Romanov	Communist Party
Aleksandr Andreyev	Communist Party
Maksim Morozov	New People
Grigory Danilov	New People
Konstantin Stepanov	Liberal Democratic Party
Fyodor Stepanov	A Just Russia
~~Lilya Romanova~~	Party of Pensioners
~~Sergey Artyushkin~~	Party of Pensioners
~~Marina Semyonova~~	Party of Pensioners
Vladimir Ilyin	Party of Pensioners

== See also ==
- 2026 Russian regional elections
