= Vasily Dimitriev =

Russian archeologist

- Василий Димитриевич Димитриев
- Born: 11 January 1924; Novoye Syurbeevo v., Tsivilsky district, Chuvash Autonomous Okrug, USSR
- Died: 8 January 2013 (aged 88); Cheboksary, Chuvash Republic, Russian Federation
- Education: Moscow State University
- Alma mater: Chuvash State Pedagogical Institute,
- Scientific career
- Fields: archaeology, history
- Workplaces: Chuvash State University

Vasily Dimitrievich Dimitriev (11 January 1924, Novoye Syurbeevo, Tsivilsky District, Chuvash Autonomous Okrug, USSR - 8 January 2013, Cheboksary, Russia) was a Soviet-Russian archaeologist.

== Biography ==
Born into a peasant family, Dimitriev graduated from Churachik Secondary School and he entered the history and philology department of the Chuvash State Pedagogical Institute (CSPI).

Dmitriev fought on the Eastern Front of World War II: from 1942, he served as an artillery school cadet, junior lieutenant, lieutenant platoon commander in anti-tank brigades on the 2nd Ukrainian, 1st Baltic, and 3rd Belorussian Fronts.

In 1948, Dmitriev graduated with honors from the CSPI. From 1946, he worked as a senior laboratory assistant in the history department of the CSPI, and from 1948, as a junior research fellow at the Chuvash Research Institute of Language, Literature and History (CRILLH; today the Chuvash State Institute of Humanities). In 1955, he completed his postgraduate studies at the Department of Soviet History of the Feudal Period at the Lomonosov Moscow State University.

For 20 years, Dimitriev was the director of the CRILLH and was also a professor at the I.N. Ulyanov Chuvash State University.

As noted by the Chuvash Encyclopedia, Dimitriev was one of the leading experts on the medieval history of the Volga region and the Volga peoples. His doctoral dissertation, defended in 1968, was titled "History of Chuvashia in the Feudal Era." Dimitriev addressed such issues as the ethnogenesis of the Chuvash people, the history of Volga Bulgaria, the position of the Bulgaro-Chuvash within the Golden Horde and the Kazan Khanate, and the Russian state's colonial policy toward the Chuvash.

Dimitriev is the author of approximately 300 scholarly works, including 19 monographs ("History of Chuvashia in the 18th Century," "Chuvash Historical Legends," "The Chuvash: Ethnic History and Traditional Culture," and others). He introduced numerous historical sources into scholarly circulation and published works on Chuvash figures such as Hyacinth (Bichurin), Spiridon Mikhailov, and Nikolay Nikolsky. He participated in the training of more than 10 doctors and 40 candidates of historical sciences.

== Scientific affairs ==
- Димитриев В. Д. История Чувашии XVIII века (до крестьянской войны 1773-1775 годов). — Чебоксары: Чуваш. гос. изд-во, 1959. — 532 с.
- Димитриев В. Д. Чебоксары: Очерки истории города конца 13–17 вв. — Чебоксары: Чувашское книжное издательство, 2003. — 184 с.
- Димитриев В. Д. Чувашские материнские селения Свияжского, Кокшайского, Чебоксарского, Козьмодемьянского, Цивильского, Ядринского, Курмышского и Симбирского уездов первой половины XVIII века: Справочник. — Чебоксары: Чувашское книжное издательство, 2006.
- Димитриев В. Д., Селиванова С. А. Чебоксары: Очерки истории города XVIII века. — Чебоксары: Чуваш. кн. изд-во, 2011. — 446 с. (в пер.)
- Димитриев В. Д. Чувашский народ в составе Казанского ханства: Предыстория и история / Сост. Д. В. Басманцев; Чувашский государственный институт гуманитарных наук. — Чебоксары: Чуваш. кн. изд-во, 2014. — 192 с. — 1000 экз. — ISBN 978-5-7670-2154-3. (в пер.)

=== Articles ===
- Димитриев В. Д. Откуда мы родом // газета «Чăваш Ен», 1991.
- Димитриев В. Д. Об обосновании Н. И. Ашмариным теории болгаро-чувашской языковой и этнической преемственности // Известия Национальной академии наук и искусств Чувашской Республики. — 1996. — No. 1. — С. 183–200.

== Awards and titles ==
=== Awards of the USSR ===
- Order of the Red Star (1945)
- Order of the Red Banner of Labor (1976)
- Order of the Patriotic War, 1st degree (1985)
- Honored Scientist of the RSFSR (1980)
- Honored Scientist of the RSFSR (1980)
- Honored Worker of Higher Education of the Russian Federation (1997)
- Medal "In Commemoration of the 100th Anniversary of the Birth of Vladimir Ilyich Lenin"
- Medal "For the Victory over Germany in the Great Patriotic War of 1941-1945"
- Medal "For the Capture of Koenigsberg"
- Medal "Veteran of Labor"

=== Awards of the Russian Federation ===
- Order of Friendship (Russia)
- Zhukov Medal
- Awards of the Chuvash Republic
- Honored Scientist of the Chuvash ASSR (1974)
- Order of Merit for the Chuvash Republic (2008)
- State Prize of the Chuvash Republic in Science and Technology (1994 and 2001)

=== Public awards ===
- Laureate of the Republican Journalism Prize named after S. V. Elger (2002)
- Metropolitan Makariy Medal (Makarievskaya Prize).
- Laureate of the Republican Journalism Prize named after Nikolai Nikolsky

=== Municipal awards ===
- Honorary citizen of Cheboksary (2012)
- Honorary citizen of Tsivilsky district (2004)
- Honorary citizen of the city of Tsivilsk (1989)

== Literature ==
- Служение истории : сб. науч. ст / Чуваш. гос. ун-т им. И. Н. Ульянова. — Чебоксары : Изд-во ЧГУ. — Вып. 1. — 2005. — 311 с. ; Вып. 2 :. — 2008. — 315 с.
- Фроянов И. Я., Смирнов Ю. П. Историк, исследователь, учёный В. Д. Димитриев. — Чебоксары : Изд-во Чуваш. гос. ун-та, 1994. — 68 с.
- Багадерова, В. «Ҫутӑ сӑнарӗ асӑмӑртах…» // Хыпар. — 2013. — 13 нарӑс. — С. 4.
- Тенюшев, И. Çĕнĕ кăларăм пуян та капăр // Тăван Атăл. — 2005. — No. 2. — С. 65–67.
- Халӑхран тухнӑ ӑсчах // Хыпар. — 2013. — 28 нарӑс. — Прил.: с. 1–16. — («Хыпар» кӗнеки ; No. 1).
- Айплатов Г. Н. Археографическая деятельность профессора В. Д. Димитриева // Марийский археогр. вестн. — 2009. — No. 9. — С. 203–207.
- Бойко, И. И., Каштанов С. М. Димитриев Василий Димитриевич : (к 85-летию со дня рождения) // Чуваш. гуманит. вестн. : археология, искусствоведение, история, правоведение, социол., филология, экономика, этнология. — 2009. — No. 4. — С. 194–201.
- Димитриев Василий Димитриевич : [некролог] // Советская Чувашия. — 2013. — 10 янв. — С. 15 : портр.
- Иванова, В. Виват, Чебоксары, виват! : страницы 60-летней масштабной «Чебоксариады» историка В. Димитриева / В. Иванова; фот. М. Дмитриева // Совет. Чувашия. — 2012. — 21 марта. — С. 2.
- Каховский В. Ф., Смирнов Ю. П. Академик В. Д. Димитриев — историк, организатор науки и педагог // Исследователи чувашской культуры и истории. — Уфа, 1998. — С. 5-20.
- Смирнов, А. Вся жизнь — служение науке // Чувашия сегодня. — 2004. — 30 янв. — С. 4.
- Смирнов, Ю. П. Видный историк-медиевист // Халăх шкулĕ = Нар. шк. — 2000. — No. 4. — С. 133–137.
- Смирнов, Ю. П. Выдающаяся фигура среди историков Среднего Поволжья // Учёные. — Чебоксары, 2006. — С. 130–144. — (Б-ка Президента Чуваш. Респ. ; т. 4).
- Тенюшев, И. Я. Мина упала в нескольких метрах... // Ульяновец. — 2005. — 5 мая. — С. 4–5.
