= Shumshevashi =

Shumshevashi (Russian: Шумшеваши) is the name of several rural localities (selos and villages) in the Chuvash Republic, Russia:

- Shumshevashi, Alikovsky District, Chuvash Republic, a selo in Shumshevashskoye Rural Settlement of Alikovsky District
- Shumshevashi, Krasnochetaysky District, Chuvash Republic, a village in Bolsheatmenskoye Rural Settlement of Krasnochetaysky District
