= Pitishevo =

Name of several Russian rural localities

Pitishevo (Russian: Питишево) is the name of several rural localities in the Chuvash Republic, Russia:

- Pitishevo, Alikovsky District, Chuvash Republic, a village in Pitishevskoye Rural Settlement of Alikovsky District
- Pitishevo, Krasnochetaysky District, Chuvash Republic, a village in Pandikovskoye Rural Settlement of Krasnochetaysky District
