= Chuvash State Agrarian University =

Agricultural university in Cheboksary, Russia

Chuvash State Agrarian University (CSAU)
- Чăваш патшалăх ялхуçалăх университечĕ (ЧПЯХУ); Чувашский государственный аграрный университет (ЧГУ)
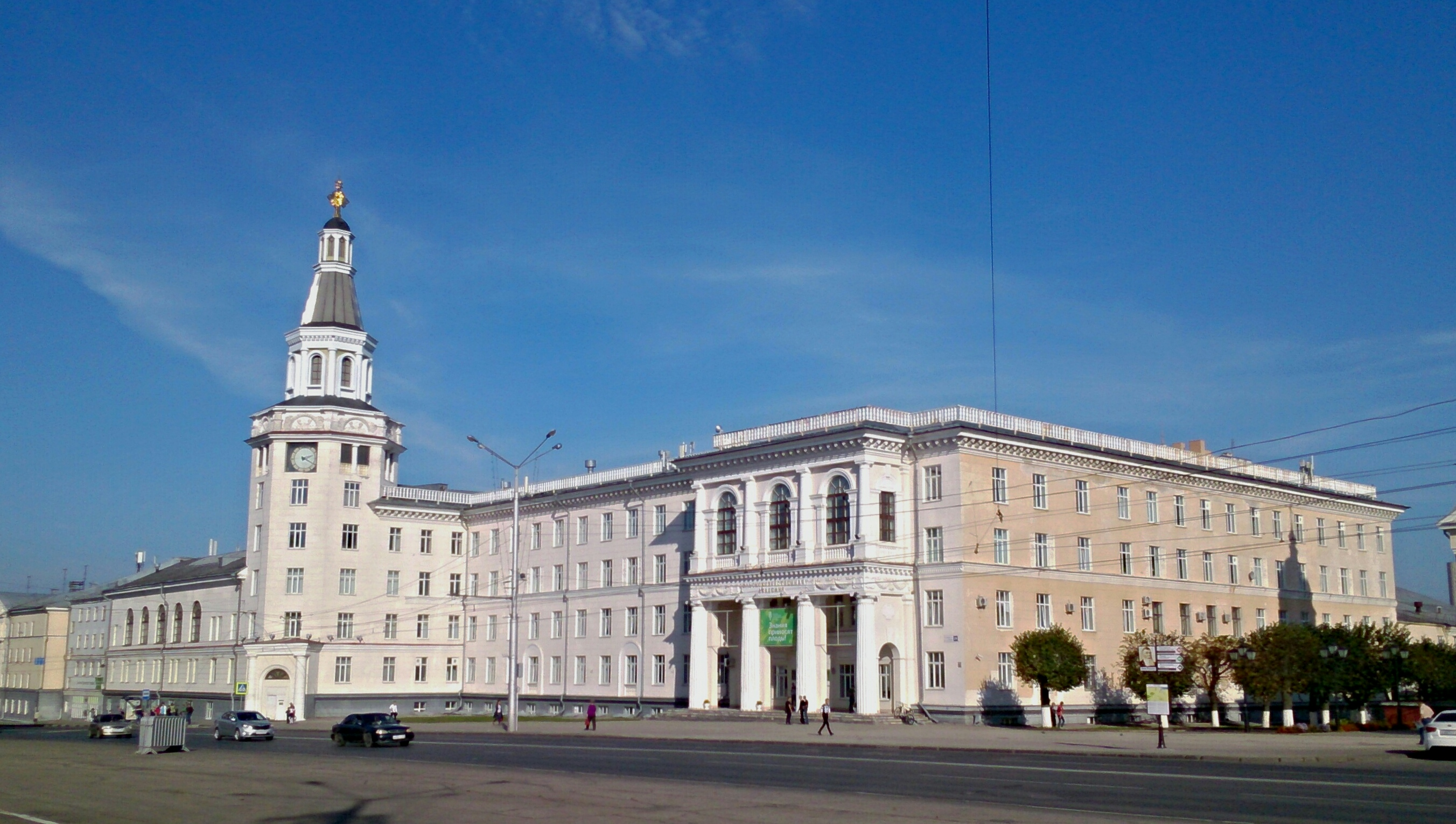
- Academic building of the University
- Established: 1 September 1931
- Rector: Andrey Makushev
- Students: 10,000
- Location: Cheboksary, Chuvash Republic, Russia; 56°8′24″N 47°15′02″E
- Campus: Urban

Chuvash State Agrarian University is a higher educational institution located in the central part of the city of Cheboksary (Chuvash Republic). The full name of the university since April 2020 is the Federal State Budgetary Educational Institution of Higher Education "Chuvash State Agrarian University" (in 1995-2020-CSAU, formerly CSAI).

== Faculties ==
- biotechnology and agronomy;
- veterinary medicine and animal science;
- engineering;
- economic.

In April 2014, the Center for Additional Professional Education was established on the basis of the Faculty of Advanced Training and Retraining of Personnel.

== History ==
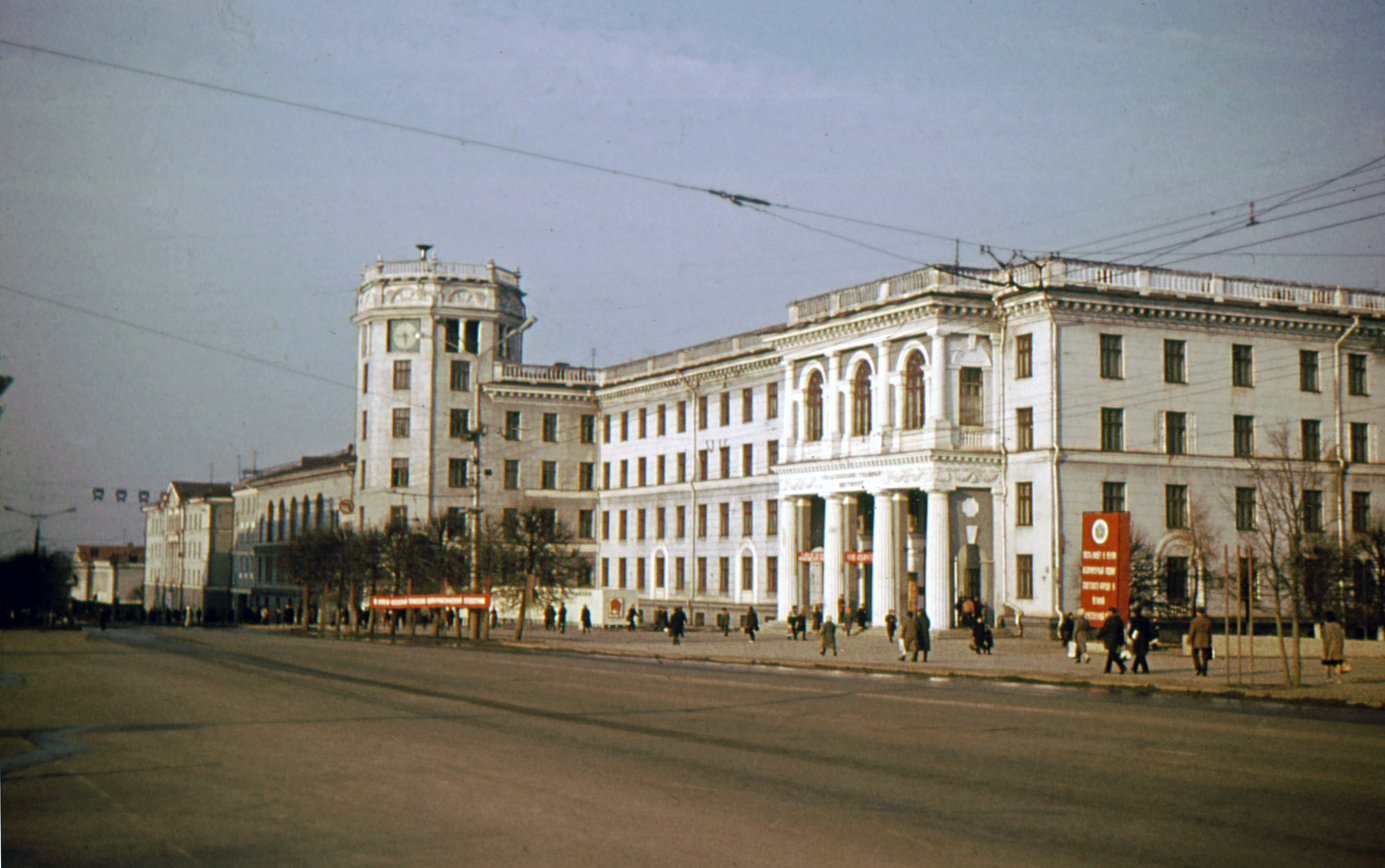
Chuvash Agricultural Institute on Lenin Square (now Republic Square). Photo from 1987.

The Agricultural Academy opened on September 1, 1931. Students were trained in difficult conditions. There were not enough textbooks, exhibits, medicines, classrooms, and qualified teachers. In 1941, it was called the Chuvash Agricultural Institute, was a university of the People's Commissariat of Agriculture of the USSR. The Great Patriotic War required a radical restructuring of the entire work of the institute. The school building and dormitories were transferred to the evacuated weaving factory. Classes were held in unsuitable premises, in schools in the second and third shifts. Many teachers and staff of the Institute went to the front.

In 1970, the preparatory department was opene. So, in September 1994, the specialty "Technology of agricultural production"was opened. The agriculture of the republic was in dire need of specialists in veterinary medicine. Based on this need, in September 1997, the specialty "Veterinary Medicine"was opened.

At the end of the 90s, new departments were opened at the university for the training of veterinary doctors and the corresponding laboratories were equipped (Academic Building No. 3 on per. Berry).

The university received the status of an academy in 1995, and the status of a university - in 2020.

== See also ==
- Chuvash State Pedagogical University
- Chuvash State University
- Chuvash State Academic Song and Dance Ensemble
- Chuvash State Symphony Capella
