= Vadim Nikolaev =

Russian politician (born 1959)

- Вадим Николаев
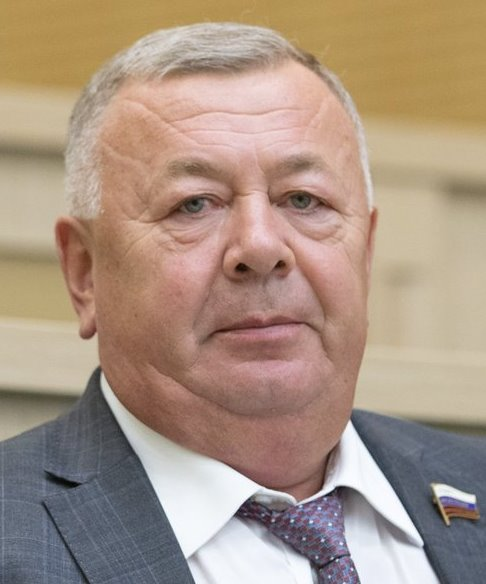

Senator from Chuvashia
- In office 11 June 2015 – 29 September 2021
- Preceded by: Leonid Lebedev
- Succeeded by: Nikolay Vladimirov

Personal details
- Born: Vadim Nikolaev; 30 August 1959 (age 67) Krasnoarmeysky District, Chuvash Republic, Chuvash Autonomous Soviet Socialist Republic, Soviet Union
- Education: Chuvash State Agrarian University

Vadim Ivanovich Nikolaev (Russian: Вадим Иванович Николаев; born 30 August 1959) is a Russian politician who served as a senator from Chuvashia from 2015 to 2021.

== Career ==
Vadim Nikolaev was born on 30 August 1959 in Krasnoarmeysky District, Chuvash Republic. In 1981, he graduated from the Chuvash State Agrarian University. After graduation, he served in the Soviet Armed Forces. From 1986 to 1990, he worked as the senior agronomist of the State Agroprom of the Chuvash ASSR. From 2002 to 2015, he was continuously re-elected as deputy of the State Council of the Chuvash Republic of the 3rd, 4th, and 5th convocations. On 11 June 2015 Nikolaev was appointed a senator from Chuvashia.
