= Nikolay Vladimirov =

Russian politician (born 1979)

- Николай Владимиров
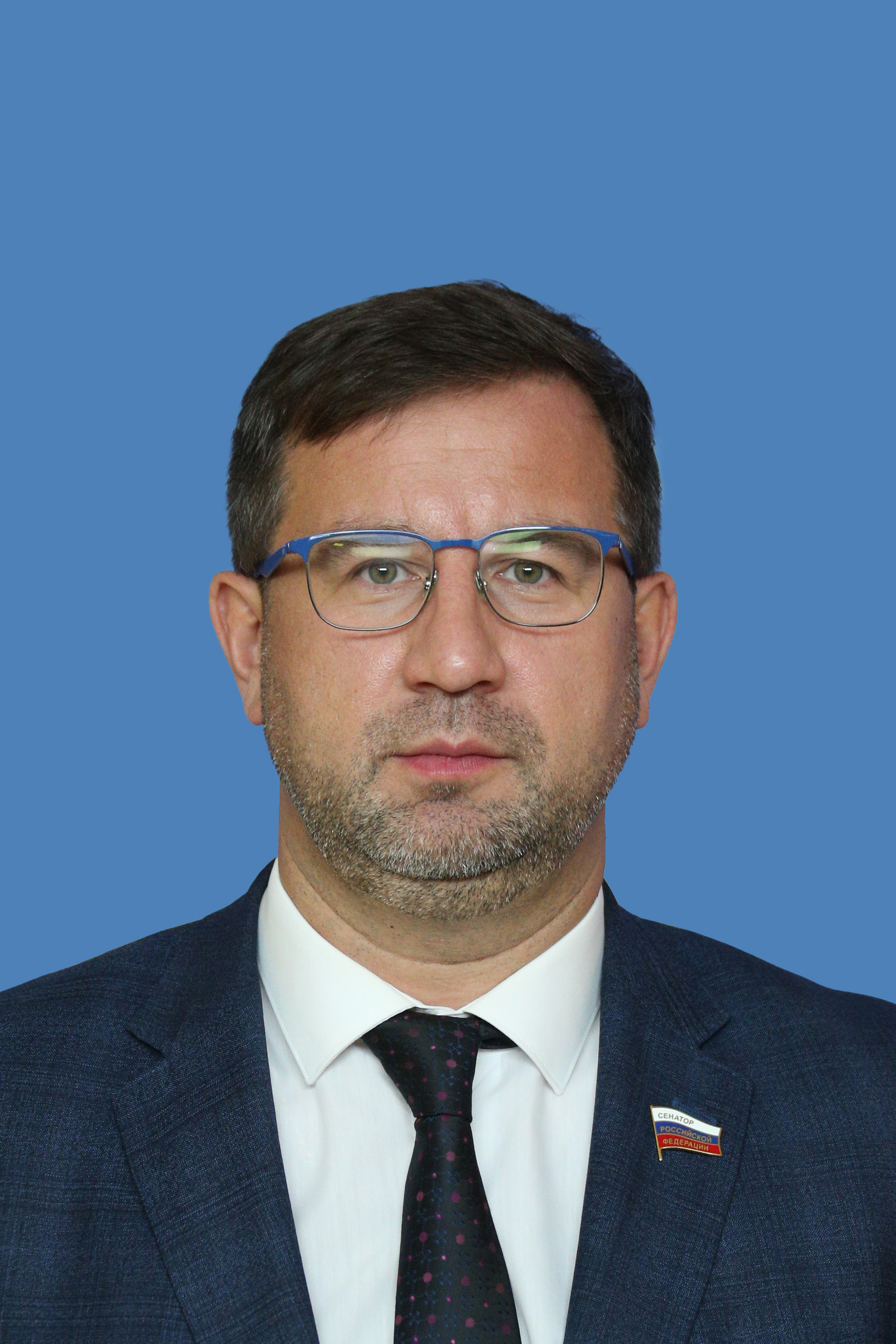

Senator from the State Council of the Chuvash Republic
- Incumbent
- Assumed office 4 October 2021
- Preceded by: Vadim Nikolaev

Personal details
- Born: Nikolay Vladimirov; 18 November 1979 (age 46) Cheboksary, Chuvash Autonomous Soviet Socialist Republic, Russian Soviet Federative Socialist Republic, Soviet Union
- Party: United Russia
- Education: Chuvash State University

Nikolay Nikolaevich Vladimirov (Russian: Николай Николаевич Владимиров; born 18 November 1979) is a Russian politician serving as a senator from the State Council of the Chuvash Republic since 4 October 2021.

Nikolay Vladimirov is under personal sanctions introduced by the European Union, the United Kingdom, the USA, Canada, Switzerland, Australia, Ukraine, New Zealand, for ratifying the decisions of the "Treaty of Friendship, Cooperation and Mutual Assistance between the Russian Federation and the Donetsk People's Republic and between the Russian Federation and the Luhansk People's Republic" and providing political and economic support for Russia's annexation of Ukrainian territories.

== Biography ==
Nikolay Vladimirov was born on 18 November 1979 in Cheboksary. In 2002, he graduated from the Chuvash State University. Afterward, he started working as a lawyer in Cheboksary. At the beginning of the 2000s, he was a member of the Yabloko party, but later left the party and joined the United Russia. From 2011 to 2021, he was the deputy of the Cheboksary State Council. From 2017 to 2021, he was the Deputy Head of Cheboksary. In 2020, he was appointed head of the United Russia party in the Cheboksary State Council. In September 2021, he was elected deputy of the State Council of the Chuvash Republic. On 29 September 2021, Vladimirov was appointed senator from the State Council of the Chuvash Republic.
