= Krasnye Chetai =

Rural locality in Chuvashia, Russia

Coordinates: 55°41′42″N 46°10′04″E

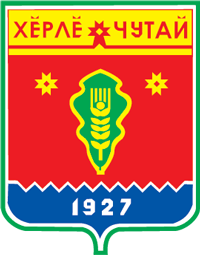
Coat of arms of Krasnye Chetai

Krasnye Chetai (Russian: Кра́сные Чета́и, Chuvash: Хĕрлĕ Чутай, Hĕrlĕ Çutay) is a rural locality (a selo) and the administrative center of Krasnochetaysky District of the Chuvash Republic, Russia. Population: 2,623 (2010 census); 2,982 (2002 census); 2,975 (1989 Soviet census).
