= Qashan Principality =

Former duchy in modern Tatarstan

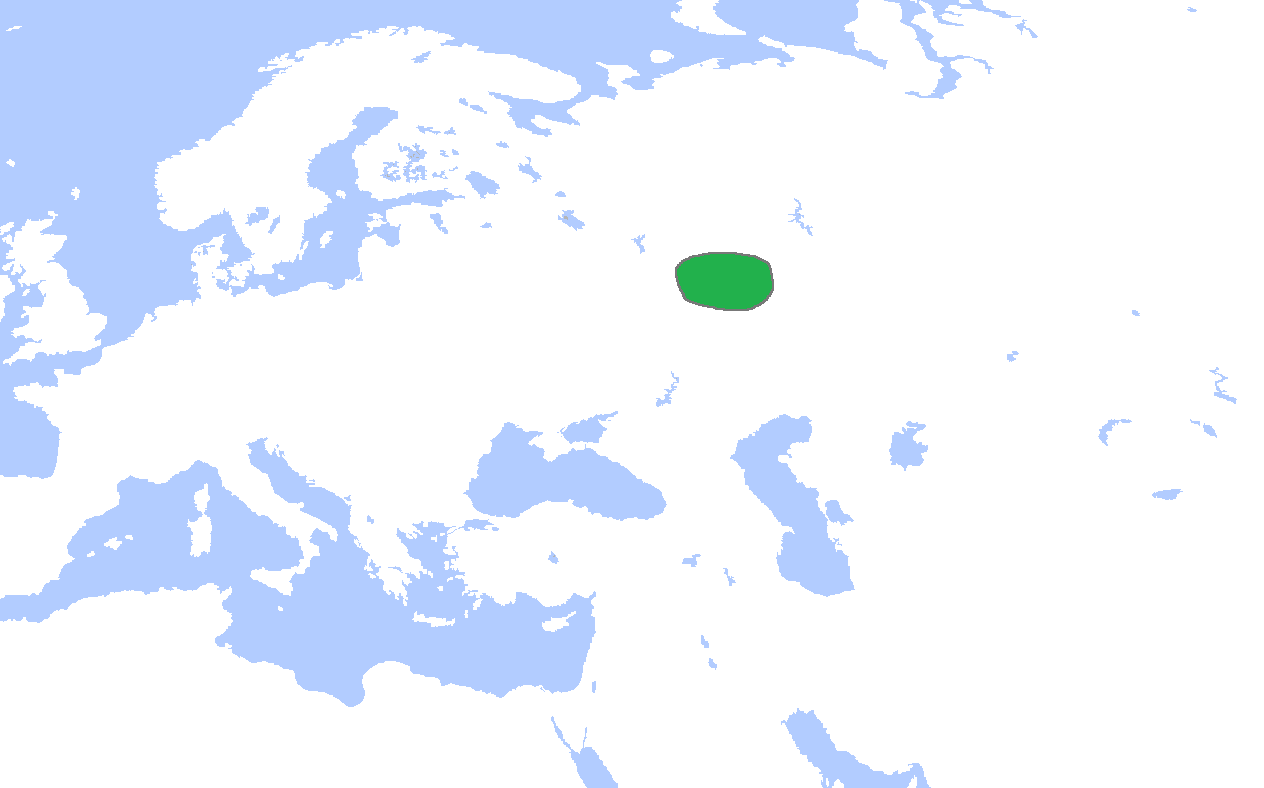
The territory of the Bulgar Ulus of the Golden Horde on the map

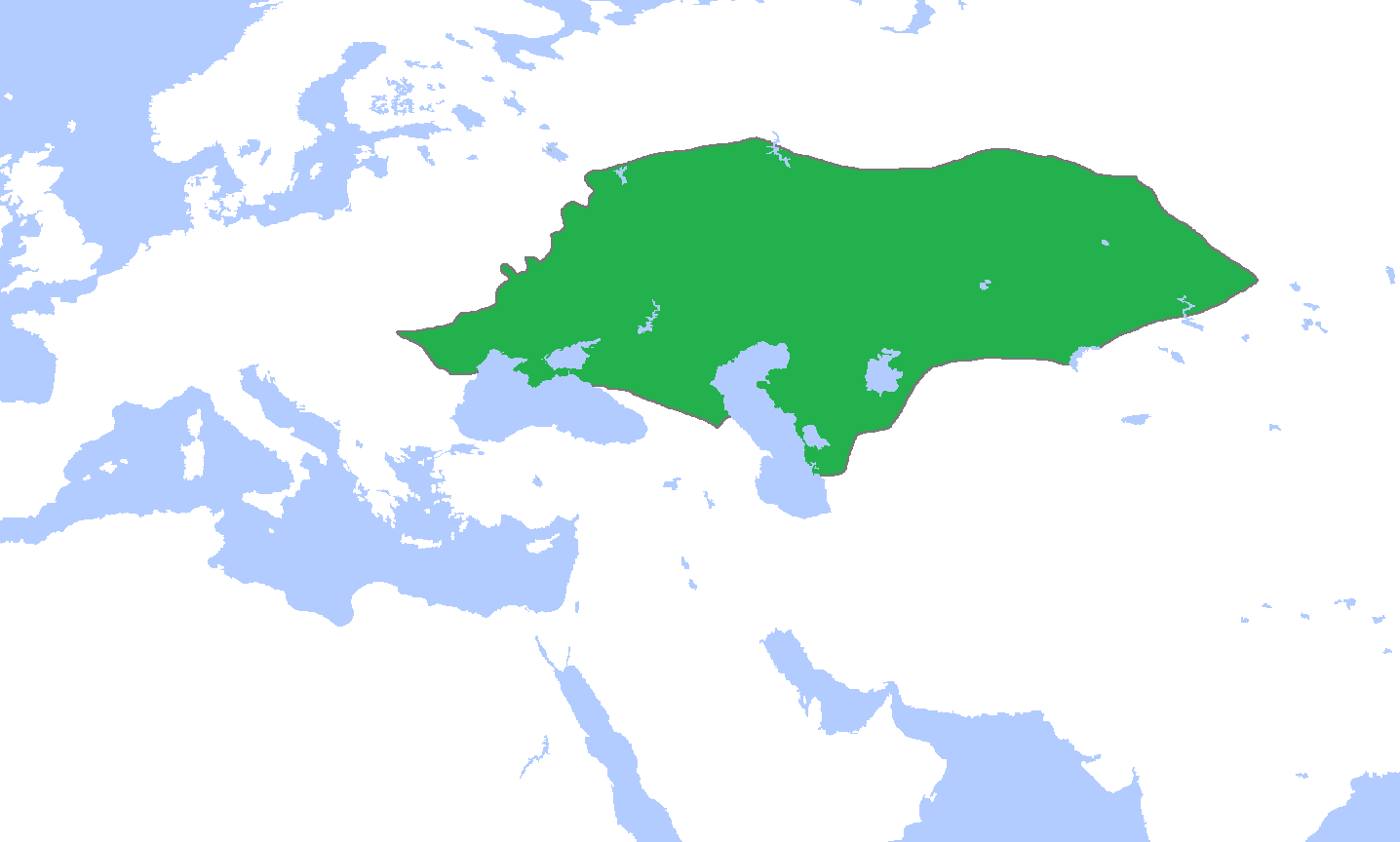
Territory of the Golden Horde on the map

The Bulgar Ulus (also the Bulgar Land, the Bulgar Region, the Bulgar Oblast, the Bulgar Vilayat) was an administrative unit (ulus) of the Golden Horde on the territory of the former Volga Bulgaria with its center in the city of Bolgar, which existed in the first half of the 13th – early 15th centuries.

The Bulgarian land was subjected to the ushkuiniks' raids several times, and also had conflicts with the Russian principalities. In 1376-1377, the united Moscow-Novgorod troops made a military campaign against the territory of the Bulgar ulus: the Bulgar army was driven inside Bolgar. The Novgorod raids ceased after the failure of the ushkuiniks' campaign to the Volga and Kama in 1409, when they were defeated and their leader was captured and taken to the Horde. By 1431, the Bulgarian land had finally turned into a "wild field" after the constant devastating raids of the troops of the temnik of the Golden Horde, Edigey

== See also ==
- Bulgarian epigraphic monuments

== Specialized literature ==
- Губайдуллин А. М., О градостроительстве в Булгарском улусе Золотой Орды// Археология евразийских степей : журнал. — 2022. — 14 мая. — С. 149―156. — doi:10.24852/2587-6112.2022.3.149.156.
- Измайлов И. Л., Волжская Булгария XIII в.: автономия или ханский улус // Золотоордынское наследие : сборник. — 2009. — № 1. — С. 31―41.
- Илюшин Б. А., Русско-булгарские военные конфликты и военный потенциал Булгарского улуса (1360—1431 гг) // Novogardia : журнал. — 2020. — № 1. — С. 138—162. — doi:10.25797/NG.2020.5.1.005.
- Исхаков Д. М., Тычинских З. А., О шибанидском «следе» в Булгарском вилайяте Улуса Джучи // Золотоордынское обозрение : журнал. — 2013. — № 2. — С. 128―145.
- Мухаметшин Д. Г., Денежное обращение Булгарского улуса во второй половине XIV в. // Золотоордынское обозрение : журнал. — 2021. — Сентябрь (т. 9, № 2). — С. 296―313. — doi:10.22378/2313-6197.2021-9-2.296-313.
- Руденко К. А., Золотые украшения Волжской Булгарии и Булгарского улуса Золотой Орды: опыт сравнительного анализа // Поволжская археология : журнал. — 2018. — № 2. — С. 111―124.
- Руденко К. А., Материальная культура кочевников Булгарской области Золотой Орды // Археология евразийских степей : журнал. — 2018. — № 4. — С. 172―175.
- Руденко К. А., О связях Волжской Булгарии и Булгарского улуса Золотой Орды с Ираном в X―XIV вв. (по археологическим материалам) // Золотоордынское обозрение : журнал. — 2018. — Т. 6, № 3. — С. 472―488.
