= Nikolai Ashmarin =

Russian linguist

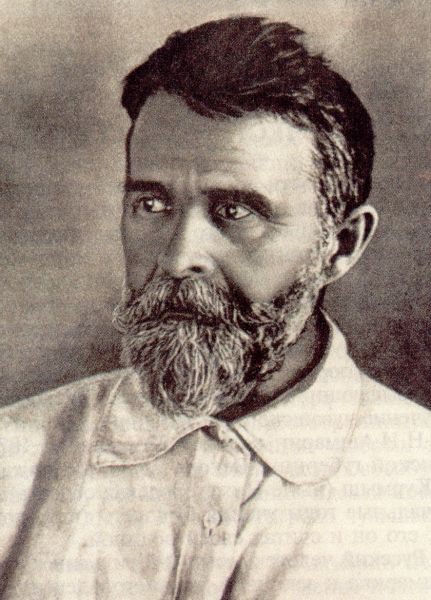

Nikolai Ivanovich Ashmarin (Russian: Никола́й Ива́нович Ашма́рин) (September 22 [O.S. October 4] 1870, Yadrin, Kazan Governorate – August 26, 1933, Kazan) was a Russian scholar who specialized in the study of Chuvash language, culture, and history. His magnum opus is "The Dictionary of Chuvash Language", published in 17 parts between 1928 and 1958. He was also a Doctor of Turkology (1925).

After graduating from the Lazarev Institute in 1896, Ashmarin taught at the schools and universities of Kazan (with short spells in Simbirsk and Baku). He published a valuable collection of Chuvash songs in 1900. He was elected a corresponding member of the Academy of Sciences of the USSR in 1929.

== Bibliography ==
=== Russian ===
- Алексин В. Совершивший научный подвиг. // Советская Чувашия. — 2000. — 24 окт.
- Алексин В. Учёный шагает по «своей» улице. // Советская Чувашия. — 2000. — 7 дек.
- Андреев И. А. Н. И. Ашмарин и современное чувашское языкознание. // Вестн. Чуваш. ун-та. — 1996. — No. 2. — С. 26–32.
- Егоров В. Г., Н. И. Ашмарин как исследователь чувашского языка. К 75-летию со дня рождения. — Чебоксары: Чувашгосиздат, 1948. — 43 с.
- Иванская Т. Юные творят с оглядкой на Ашмарина. // Советская Чувашия. — 2000. — 25 нояб.
- Малов С. Е., Памяти Н. И. Ашмарина. // Записки чувашского Научно-исследовательского института языка, литературы и истории. — 1941. — Вып. 1.
- Марфин Ю. Создатель уникального словаря. // Чебоксарские новости. — 2000. — 15 нояб.
- Сорокин В. Перед Ашмариным в долгу. // Советская Чувашия. — 2000. — 22 нояб.
- Федотов М. Р. Познавший душу языка. // Советская Чувашия. — 1990. — 4 окт.
- Федотов М. Р. В юношеском труде сказался весь Ашмарин. // Советская Чувашия. — 1998. — 20 мая.
- Федотов М. Р. Великий тюрколог. // Советская Чувашия. — 1995. — 7 окт.
- Федотов М. Р. Краткий очерк о жизни и деятельности Н. И. Ашмарина. // Лик Чувашии. — 1995. — No. 1. — С. 147–164.
- Федотов М. Р. Н. И. Ашмарин: Краткий очерк жизни и деятельности. — Чебоксары: Б.и., 1995. — 51 с.
- Федотов М. Р. Тернистый путь Ашмарина к многотомному словарю чувашского языка. // Советская Чувашия. — 1995. — 24, 25, 26 мая.
- Хузангай А. П. Столп и утверждение чувашской филологии // Советская Чувашия. — 2000. — 14 апр.
- Хузангай А. П. Ашмарин как поэт... // Республика. — 2000. — 7 окт.
- Хузангай А. П. Столп и утверждение чувашской филологии // Ашмарин Н. И. Болгары и чуваши. — Чебоксары: ЧГИГН, 2000. — С. 5–8.
- Хузангай А. П. Ашмарин/Айги: диалог через столетия // Новый Лик. — 2001. — Вып. 1.

Хузангай А. П. Плод честного усердья

- Чернов М. Ф. «Словарь чувашского языка» Н. И. Ашмарина — выдающийся памятник чувашской письменности. // Изв. Инженерно—технолог. акад. Чуваш. Респ. — 1996. — No. 1 (2). — С. 245–249.

=== Chuvash ===
- Адюкова И. Чăваш ăслăлăхĕн ашшĕ. // Eлчĕк ен. — 2000. — 30 авăн.
- Алексеев А. «Хам вырăс пулин те, чăваш халăхĕн шăпи манăн чĕреме тăван вырăс халăхĕн шăпи пек çывăх». // Тантăш. — 1995. — 20 юпа. — С. 9.
- Алексеев А. Чăваш филологийĕн классикĕ. // Сувар. — 1995. — 3 чÿк.
- Андреев И. А. Аслă тĕпчевçĕ. // Тăван Атăл. — 1970. — No. 9. — С. 67–70.
- Андреев И. А. Чăваш ăслăлăхĕн аслашшĕ. // Хыпар. — 1995. — 4 юпа.
- Васильева E. Н. И. Ашмарин тата халăха вĕрентес ĕç / E. Васильева, А. Горшков // Хыпар. — 1996. — 26 пуш.
- Виноградов Ю. Чĕлхе хăватне ĕненсе. // Ялав. — 1980. — No. 10. — С. 32.
- Димитриев В. Д. Н. И. Ашмарин пăлхарсемпе чăвашсен чĕлхе тата этнос пĕрлĕхĕ çинчен вĕрентни. // Хыпар. — 1996. — 24 авăн.
- Илле Элли Ашмарин профессор хăш халăх çынни? // Хыпар. — 2000. — 2 çурла.
- Ильин Г. Н. И. Ашмарин — чăваш чĕлхин наукине пуçараканĕ. // Ял ĕçченĕ (Тăвай р-нĕ). — 2000. — 27 юпа.
- Ларионов Н. Ашмарин — чăваш халăхĕ пулса кайни çинчен. // Канаш (Ульяновск обл.).— 2003.— 4 авăн (No. 36).— С. 5.
- Ларионов Н. Ашмарин — чăваш чĕлхе пĕлĕвне хываканни. // Канаш (Ульяновск обл.).— 2004.— 1 ака (No. 14). — С. 4.
- Николай Ашмарин: Чаплă чăваш тĕпчевçи Николай Иванович Ашмарин çуралнăранпа 125 çул çитнĕ ятпа / М. И. Скворцов пухса хатĕрленĕ // Хыпар. — 1995. — 27 юпа. — («Хыпар» кĕнеки, No. 17).
- Николай Иванович Ашмарин: Хыпарçăсем // Хыпар. — 1996. — 8 нарăс.
- Сергеев В. Унăн ячĕ ĕмĕр хисепре. // Тăван Атăл. — 1980. — No. 10. — С. 76–78.
- Скворцов М. И. Чăваш чĕлхин пуянлăхĕ Н. И. Ашмарин словарĕнче. // Халăх шкулĕ — Народная школа. — 1995. — No. 5. — С. 66–70.
- Скворцова Р. «Ашмарин çĕкленĕ ялав вĕлкĕшсех тăрĕ…» // Хыпар. — 1995. — 28 юпа.
- Смолин А. Чăваш-и вăл е чăваш мар-и...: Сăвă. // Тăван Атăл. — 1988. — No. 11. — С. 54.
- Федотов М. Р. Паллă тĕпчевçĕ çыравĕ. // Ялав. — 1982. — No. 8. — С. 30.
- Хусанкай А. П. Чăвашлăхĕпе тĕнчере палăрнă. // Хыпар. — 2000. — 19 юпа.
