= Chuvash State Pedagogical University =

Public university in Cheboksary, Chuvashia, Russia

Chuvash State Pedagogical University (CSPU)
- Чувашский государственный педагогический университет имени И. Я. Яковлева (ЧГПУ); Чӑваш патшалӑх И. Я.Яковлев ячӗллӗ педагогика университечӗ
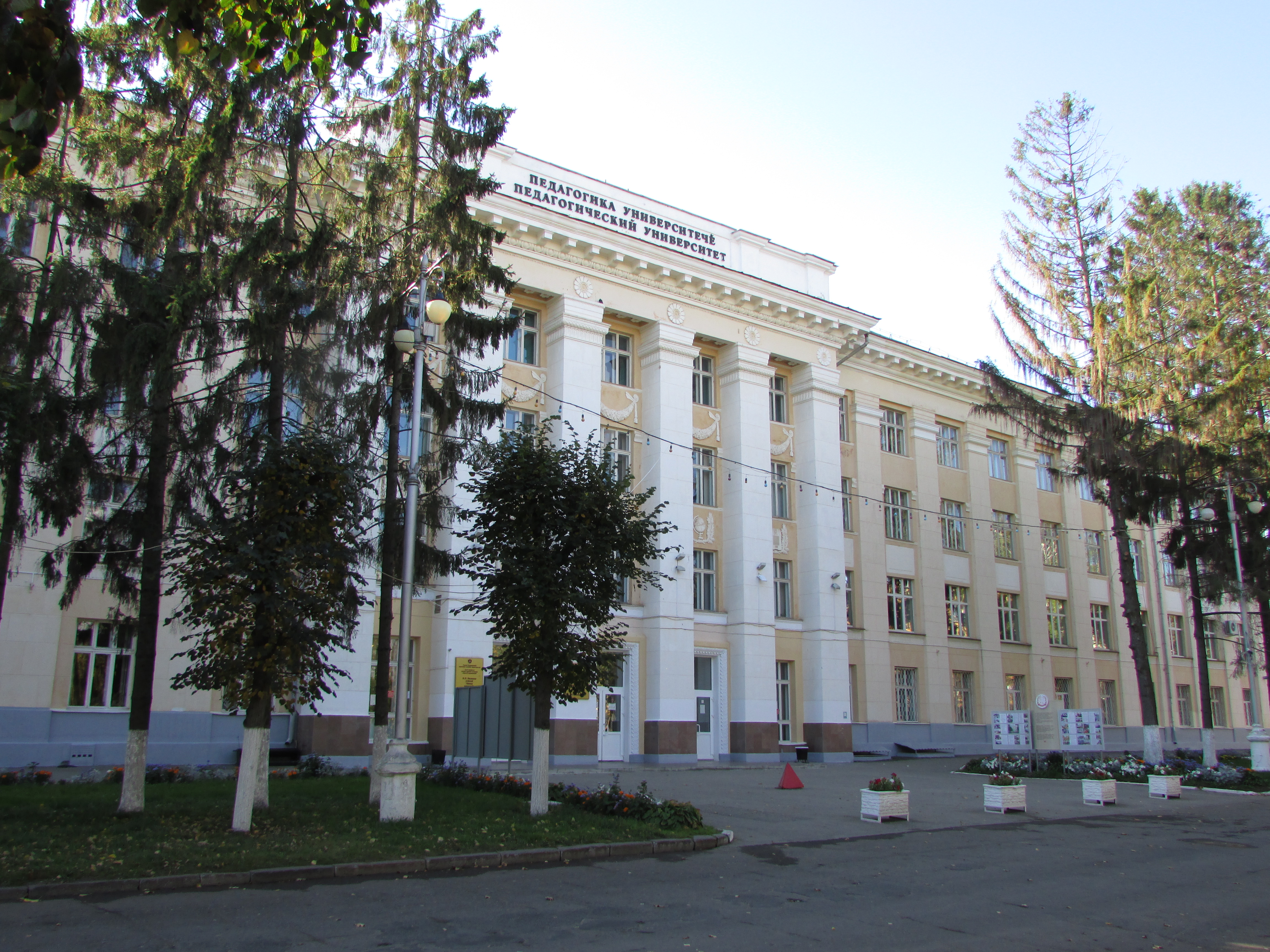
- Academic building of the University
- Established: 10 June 1930
- Rector: Vladimir Ivanov
- Students: 5,500
- Location: Cheboksary, Chuvash Republic, Russia; 56°8′20″N 47°14′59″E
- Campus: Urban
- Website: 1.chgpu.edu.ru/

Chuvash State Pedagogical University (I. Ya. Yakovlev Chuvash State Pedagogical University, Chuvash: И. Я. Яковлев ячĕллĕ Чӑваш патшалӑх педагогика университечӗ) is the first national higher educational institution of the Chuvash Republic, located in Cheboksary.

== History ==
The university was founded in 1930, opened by the decree of the Central Executive Committee and the Council of People's Commissars of the RSFSR in October 1930 as the Chuvash State Pedagogical Institute. In 1934, the departments were reorganized into the faculties of History, Language and Literature, Natural Science, and Physics and Mathematics. In the same year, the teachers ' Institute was organized at the institute, which functioned until 1952.

By the decree of the Council of Ministers of the RSFSR in 1958, the university was named after the Chuvash teacher-educator Ivan Yakovlevich Yakovlev.

== University today ==
The number of students is more than 5.5 thousand people. The newspapers "Pedvuzovets", scientific journals of the Higher Attestation Commission "Bulletin of the I. Ya. Yakovlev ChSPU", "Bulletin of the I. Ya. Yakovlev CHSPU: The series" Mechanics of the limit state»

== Rectors ==
- 1963-1983 – Markov Anatoly Semyonovich
- 1983-1984 – Akhmeev Gury Nikolaevich
- 1984-1999 – Sidorov Georgy Sidorovich
- 2000-2011 – Grigoriev Georgy Nikolaevich
- 2011-2016 – Mirnov Boris Guryevich
- 2017-2023 – Ivanov Vladimir Nikolaevich
- from 2023 – Kozhanov Igor Vladimirivich

== See also ==
- Chuvash State University
- Chuvash State Agrarian University
- Chuvash State Academic Song and Dance Ensemble
- Chuvash State Symphony Capella
