= Krasnochetaysky District =

Krasnochetaysky District Красночетайский район (Russian)
- District

Other transcription(s)
  - Chuvash: Хĕрлĕ Чутай районӗ
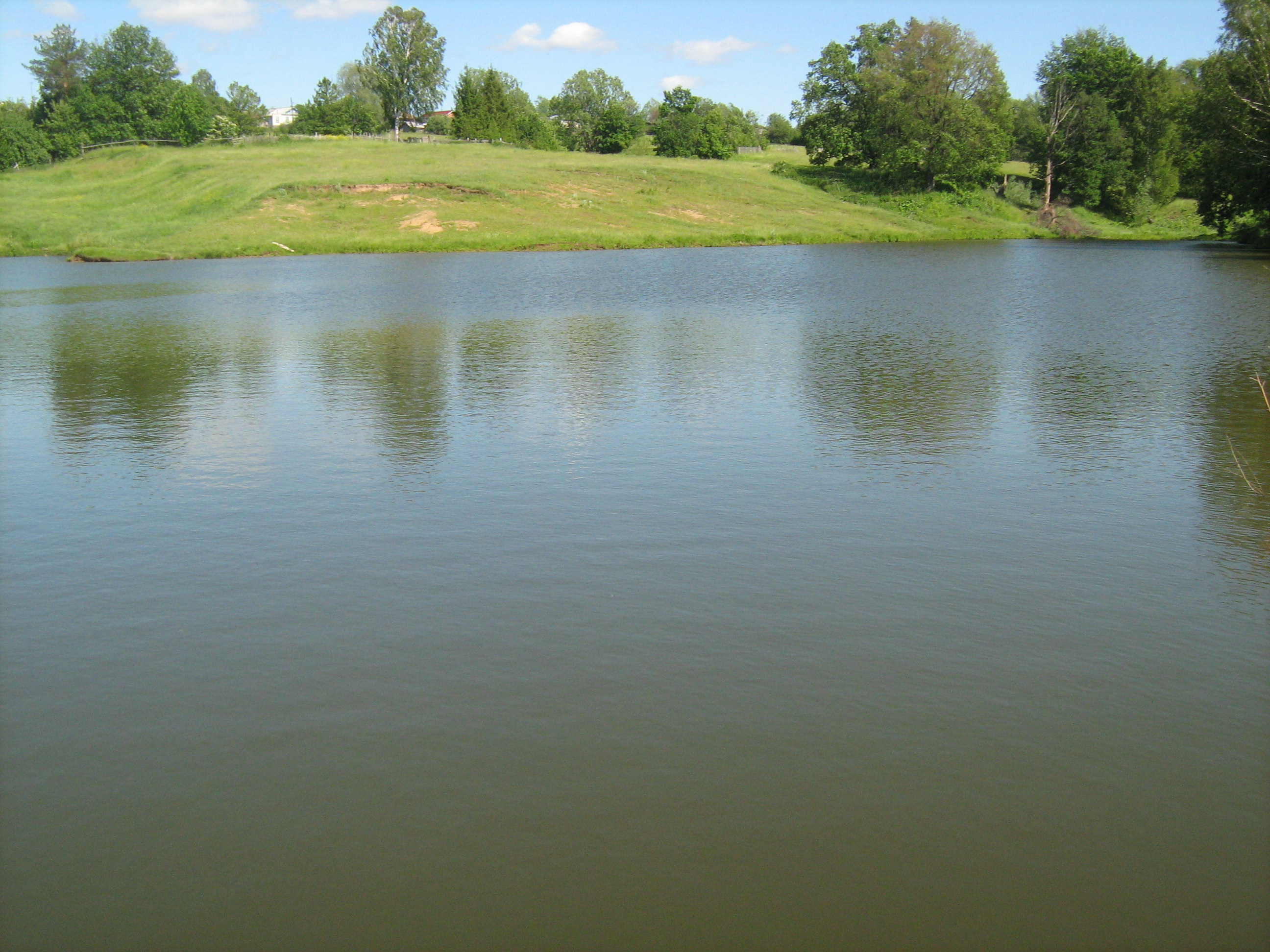
- Pond in Krasnochetaysky District

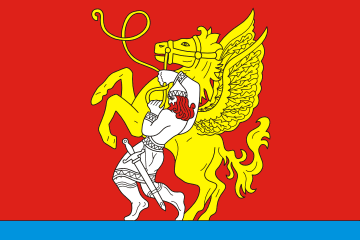
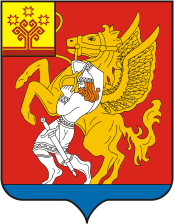
- Flag Coat of arms
- Location of Krasnochetaysky District in the Chuvash Republic
- Coordinates: 55°40′00″N 46°15′00″E
- Country: Russia
- Federal subject: Chuvash Republic
- Established: September 27, 1944
- Administrative center: Krasnye Chetai

Area
  - Total: 691.6 km^{2} (267.0 sq mi)

Population (2010 Census)
  - Total: 16,941
  - Density: 24.50/km^{2} (63.44/sq mi)
  - Urban: 0%
  - Rural: 100%

Administrative structure
  - Administrative divisions: 10 rural settlement
  - Inhabited localities: 70 rural localities

Municipal structure
  - Municipally incorporated as: Krasnochetaysky Municipal District
  - Municipal divisions: 0 urban settlements, 10 rural settlements
- Time zone: UTC+3 (MSK)
- OKTMO ID: 97626000
- Website: http://gov.cap.ru/main.asp?govid=69

Krasnochetaysky District (Russian: Красночета́йский райо́н; Chuvash: Хĕрлĕ Чутай районӗ, Hĕrlĕ Çutay rayonĕ) is an administrative and municipal district (raion), one of the twenty-one in the Chuvash Republic, Russia. It is located in the west of the republic and borders with Yadrinsky District in the north, Morgaushsky District in the east, Alikovsky and Shumerlinsky Districts in the south, and with Nizhny Novgorod Oblast in the west. The area of the district is 691.6 square kilometers (267.0 sq mi). Its administrative center is the rural locality (a selo) of Krasnye Chetai. Population: 16,941 (2010 census); 21,117 (2002 census); 24,589 (1989 Soviet census). The population of Krasnye Chetai accounts for 15.5% of the district's total population.

== History ==
The district was formed on September 27, 1944.

== Notable people ==
- Anatoly Danilov (born 1954), painter
- Oleg Nikolayev (born 1969 in Cherbay), politician
