= Chuvash State University =

University in Russia

Chuvash State University (ChuvSU)
- Чувашский государственный университет имени И. Н. Ульянова (ЧувГУ им. И. Н. Ульянова); Чӑваш патшалӑх И. Н. Ульянов ячӗллӗ университечӗ
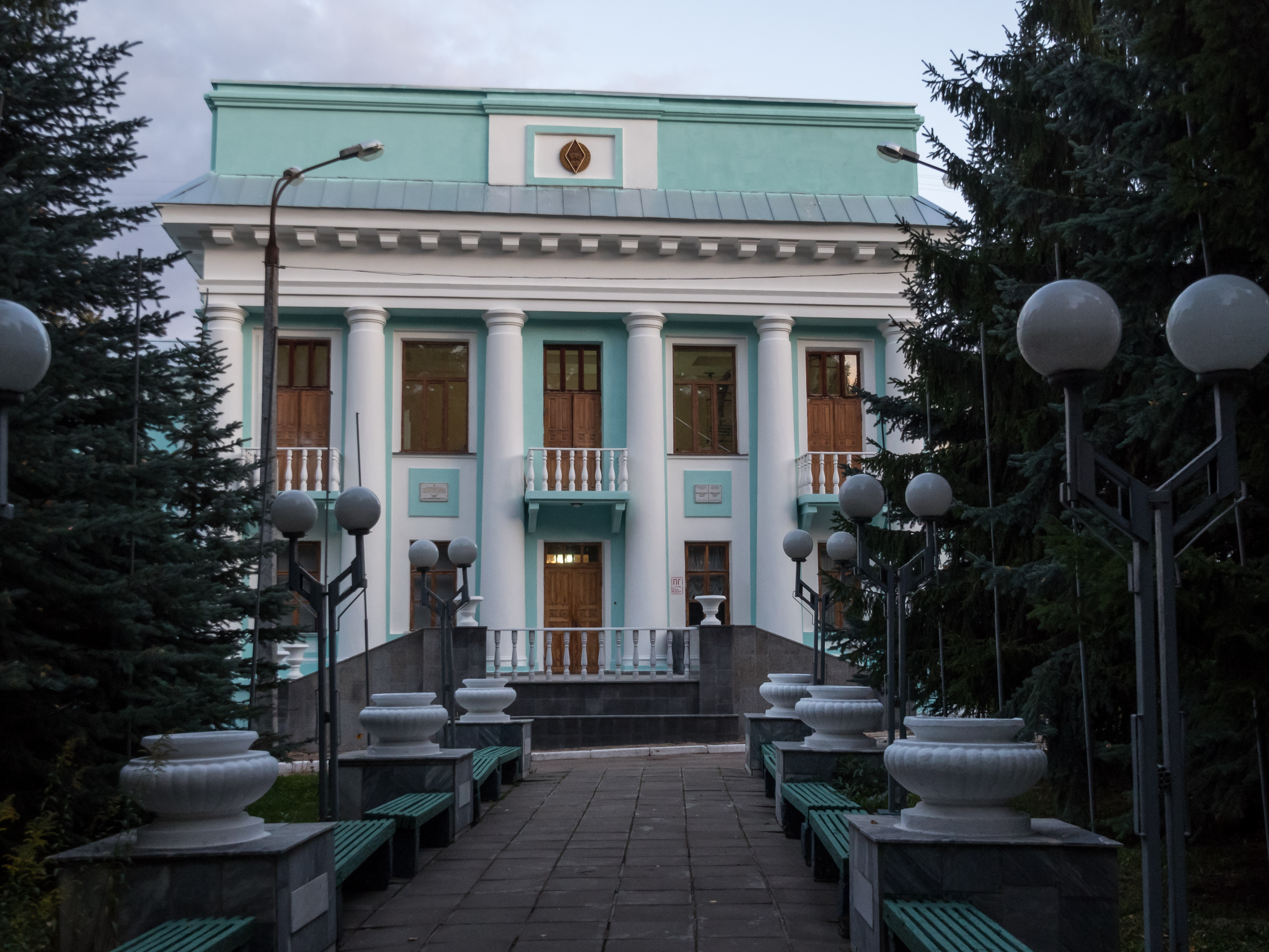
- Main campus building
- Established: 17 August 1967
- Rector: Andrey Aleksandrov
- Students: 17,500
- Undergraduates: 825 (Bacc. / В.Sc., B.A.)
- Postgraduates: 9218 (Mag./ M.Sc., M.A.); 7000 (Dr. / M.D., J.D.)
- Doctoral students: 446 (Ph.D.); 11 (Dr. Habil.)
- Location: Cheboksary, Chuvash Republic, Russia; 56°8′44″N 47°13′28″E
- Campus: Urban
- Website: www.chuvsu.ru

I. N. Ulianov Chuvash State University is a public university located in Cheboksary, the capital of the Chuvash Republic, Russia. The university is one of the leading institutions of higher learning in Russia and is the scientific, educational and cultural center of the Privolzhsky Federal Region of the Russian Federation.

Chuvash State University has over 10,000 students and 3,865 faculty, including 150 Professors (Dr. Habil.) and 600 Docents (Ph.D.). The rector is Andrey Aleksandrov.

== History ==
In 1920 the revolutionary committee and decided to create a university Cheboksary. The question about the creation of the Chuvash State University was raised again in 1958–19, but even then it could not be done because of many problems connected with the absence of the material base and lack of scientific staff in the republic.

The university was formed on 17 August 1967 through a merger of the Volga Branch of the Order of Lenin Moscow Energy Institute and the Historical-Philological Department of the I. Ya. Yakovlev Chuvash State Pedagogical Institute. It was named after Ilya Nikolaevich Ulianov, an educator. Opened already in 1930 the part of historically philological faculty of the Chuvash Pedagogical Institute joined the university.

== Faculties ==
The university has 15 faculties:

- Faculty of Informatics and Computer Engineering
- Faculty of Applied Mathematics, Physics and Information Technology
- Faculty of Radio Electronics and Automation
- Faculty of Civil Engineering
- Faculty of Mechanical Engineering
- Faculty of Energy and Electrical Engineering
- Faculty of Management and Social Technologies
- Faculty of History and Geography
- Faculty of Medicine
- Faculty of Chemistry and Pharmacy
- Faculty of Foreign Languages
- Faculty of Russian and Chuvash Philology and Journalism
- Faculty of Economics
- Faculty of Law
- Faculty of Arts

These are further subdivided into 88 departments.

== Notable alumni ==
- Nikolay Fyodorov – politician and former President of the Chuvash Republic
- Yulia Polyachikhina – model and Miss Russia 2018

== See also ==
- Chuvash State Pedagogical University
- Chuvash State Academic Song and Dance Ensemble
- Chuvash State Symphony Capella
