= Chuvash State Academic Song and Dance Ensemble =

Russian art collective

- Origin: Cheboksary, Chuvashia, Russia
- Genres: Folk; classical
- Years active: 1924–present

Chuvash State Academic Song and Dance Ensemble is a Russian art collective, originally named the Chuvash National Choir.

== History ==
The team was founded in 1924 by Chuvash professional music composers and choral conductors F.P. Pavlov (1892–1931) and V.P. Vorobyov (1887–1954) as the Chuvash National Choir. Its leaders began to gather and process Chuvash folk songs, performing them for the public in Chuvashia and throughout Russia. In the 1920s the choir toured in Moscow, Leningrad and Gorky.

=== Ensemble ===
In 1939 the Chuvash National Choir was renamed the Chuvash State Song and Dance Ensemble. The first artistic director was a young composer and conductor A.G. Orlov-Shuzm (1914–1996). Under his leadership the ensemble performed in Moscow, music and dance of the RSFSR peoples. Later the ensemble was led by conductor Kazatchkov S.A. (1909–2005).

=== World War II ===
The activity continued during World War II. The Ensemble stayed three-months at the Bryansk and Kalinin Fronts in the winter of 1943.

== Recognition ==
- Winner of All-Union and All-Russian review,
- Laureate of the State K. Ivanov's Prize of the Chuvash Republic
- Team was awarded the title "academic" ensemble (1994).
- Honorary diploma of the Chuvash Republic (2009).

== See also ==
- Chuvash State Symphony Capella

== Literature ==
- Кондратьев М. Г. Государственный ансамбль песни и танца Чувашской АССР: История возникновения. Этапы развития. Творческие искания. – Cheboksary, 1989.
- Кондратьев М. Г. Государственный ансамбль песни и танца Чувашской Республики. Справочник (1924–1991). – Cheboksary, 1992.
- Кондратьев М. Г. Чувашская музыка : От мифологических времён до становления современного профессионализма. – М., 2007.
- Кондратьев М. Г. Чувашский государственный академический ансамбль песни и танца. Альбом-буклет. – Cheboksary, 2014.
