= Yuri Yevlampyev =

Russian footballer

Personal information
- Full name: Yuri Nilovich Yevlampyev
- Date of birth: 19 June 1966 (age 60)
- Place of birth: Cheboksary, Chuvash ASSR
- Height: 1.74 m (5 ft 8 1/2 in)
- Position: Midfielder

Senior career*
Years	Team	Apps	(Gls)
1991–1992	FC Azamat Cheboksary	41	(13)
1992–1993	FC Fakel Voronezh	56	(7)
1994	FC Krylia Sovetov Samara	20	(1)
1995	FC Lada Dimitrovgrad	16	(2)
1995	FC SKD Samara	9	(0)
1996	FC Industriya Borovsk	37	(4)
1997–1998	FC Kristall Smolensk	47	(3)
2000–2001	FC Luch Vladivostok	50	(0)
2002	FC Dynamo Bryansk	2	(0)
2003–2006	FC Alnas Almetyevsk	119	(4)
2007–2009	FC Chelyabinsk	83	(1)
- * Club domestic league appearances and goals

Yuri Nilovich Yevlampyev (Russian: Юрий Нилович Евлампьев; born 19 June 1966) is a former Russian professional footballer.

== Club career ==
He made his debut in the Russian Premier League in 1992 for FC Fakel Voronezh.
