= Public Order (Badge of Honor) Russian Drama Theater =

Drama theatre in Cheboksary, Russia

- Государственный ордена «Знак почета» Русский драматический театр
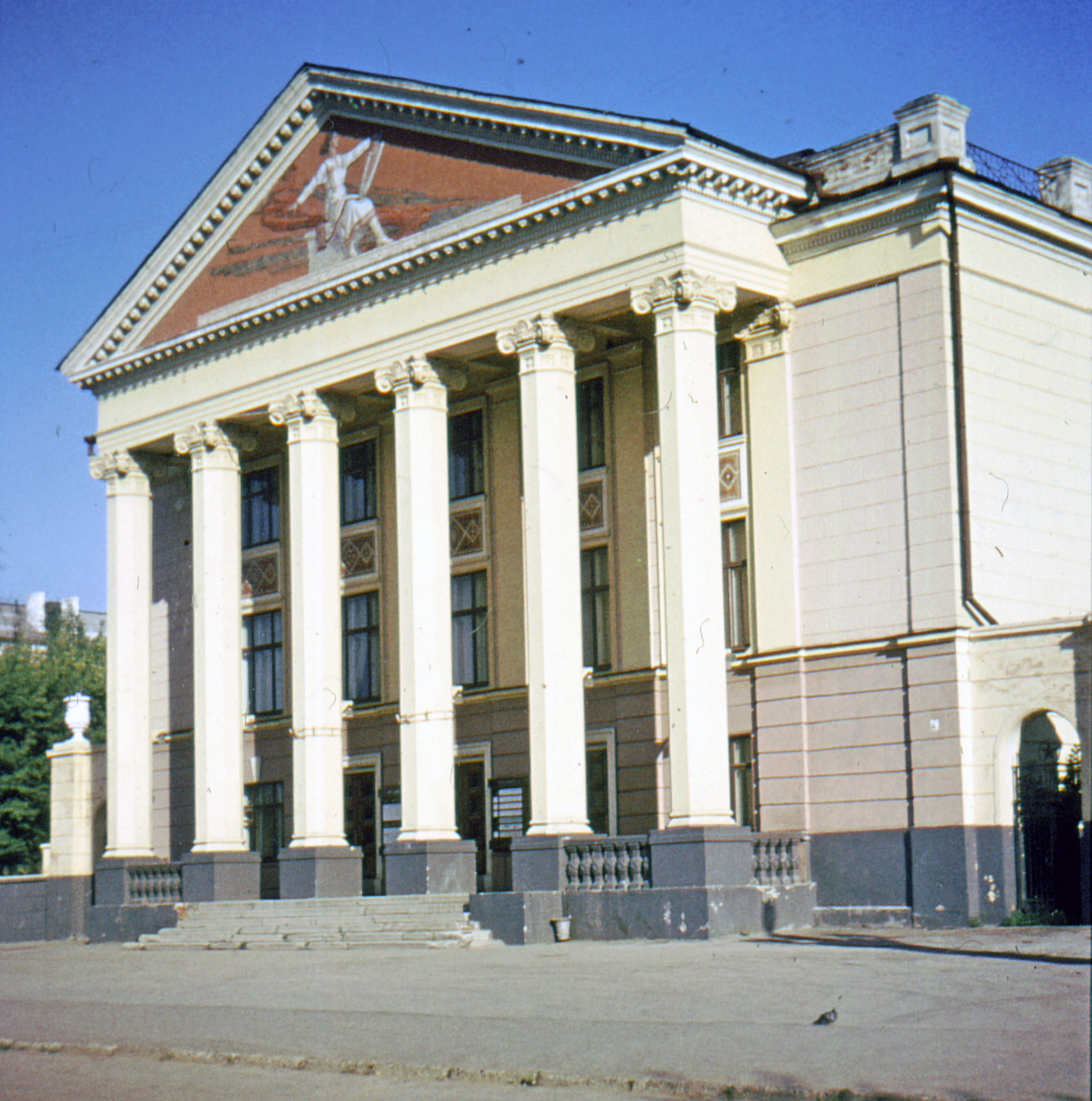
- Cheboksary Russian Drama Theatre in 1980s

- Russian Drama Theater
- Address: Ulitsa Gagarina; Cheboksary; Chuvashia, Russia
- Coordinates: 56.126356°N 47.26435°E

Construction
- Opened: 14 December 1922

Website
- link (in Russian)

Public Order (Badge of Honor) Russian Drama Theater is a theatre located in Cheboksary, Chuvashia, Russia. It was founded on 14 December 1922.

== History ==
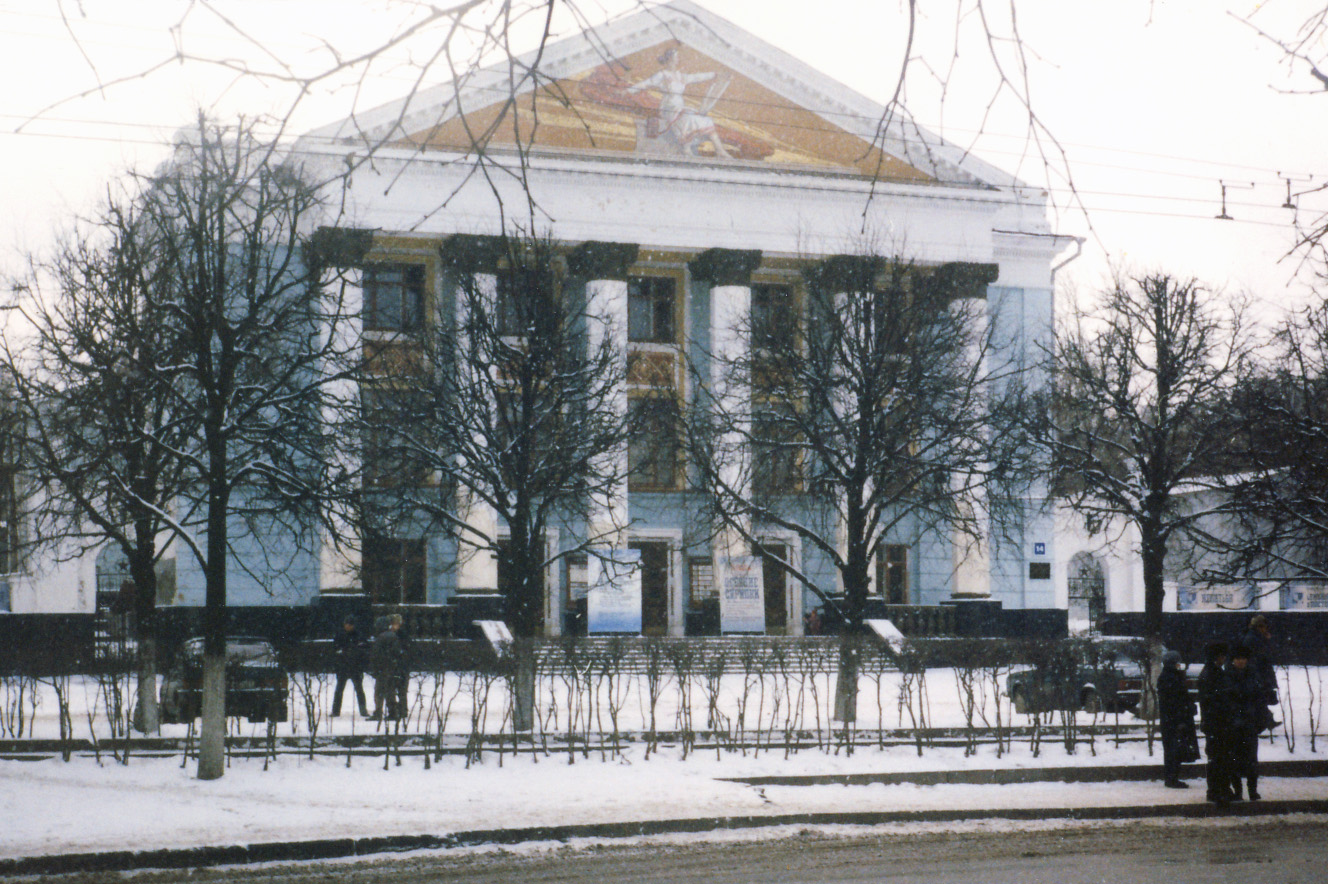
Russian Drama Theater in 2001

In the summer of 1918 in the house of a merchant of Cheboksary, was organized a Russian drama group. This group formed the basis of the troupe that opened the theatre in 1922. On 14 December 1922 started the first theatrical season of the Russian Drama Theater with the representation of Vasilisa Melentyeva based on the play by Alexander Ostrovsky. The first director of the theatre was I. A. Sloboda (Kukarnikov). In 1935, the theatre was directed by E. A. Tokmakov. From 1979 to 1989, as chief director worked M. Zilberman, then B. I. Nosovskiy, and now is Ashot Vaskonyan.

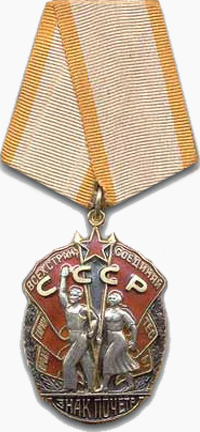
Order of the Badge of Honour

In 1952, for its 30th anniversary, and in 1972 for its 50th anniversary, the theatre was awarded by the Presidium of the Supreme Soviet of the Russian SFSR. On 9 December 1982 the Presidium of the Supreme Soviet awarded the Order of the Badge of Honour to the Russian Drama Theatre for its services in developing the theatrical art.

== Awards ==
- 1952, 1972 – Certificates of Honor by the Presidium of the Supreme Soviet of the Russian Soviet Federative Socialist Republic.
- December 9, 1982 – the Order of the Badge of Honour by decree of the Presidium of the Supreme Soviet (for services to the development of theatrical art).
- February 27, 2023 – the theater staff received the Gratitude of the President of the Russian Federation (for services to the development of national culture and art, many years of productive work).
