= Language festival (Esperanto) =

A language festival (Esperanto: Lingva Festivalo) is a cultural and educational event held by Esperanto and other organizations in different countries around the world. The purpose of language festivals is to teach and provide information about the world's languages to people interested in languages and cultures, and to show the wealth and diversity of language. Language festivals also aim at demonstrating that all languages in the world are equally important and valuable, and that there should be no "major" and "minor" languages, which are ideas broadly promoted by Esperanto-speakers.

During the first Language Festival in France in 1995, 32 languages were presented. In the second festival in 1996 there were already 65 languages. In the third, 85. The biggest festivals up till now took place in China and England with more than 100 languages in both events.

== History ==
The first language festival was held in 1995 by an American Esperantist, Dennis Keefe, in Tours, France. The following year, a festival organized in a similar way was held in Cheboksary, Russia. The Cheboksary Language Festival has since been the largest-scale language festival in Russia.

Since then, language festivals have been held in various countries of the world, such as Australia, Belgium, Finland, France, Russia, Slovakia, Sweden, Ukraine, United States and Venezuela. In 2008, Dennis Keefe organized a language festival at Nanjing University, China. In 2014, Ghil'ad Zuckermann founded the Adelaide Language Festival, Australia. In 2018, the first ever language festival in Indonesia was organized in Surabaya.

== Language presentations and other events ==
Languages are presented at 20 to 60-minute introductory lessons. The presenter therein provides general information about the language, and often teaches the visitors to say a few simple phrases and sometimes to read and write in the language. There are usually several language lessons given at the same time (so-called "language parallels"), so that each visitor has to choose which presentation s/he would like to attend at each slot. Apart from language lessons, language festivals usually include introductory lectures on subjects related to languages and linguistics, as well as so-called "language clubs", which are places where visitors can speak to one another in a certain language, listen to music and see films in this language. Also, language festivals often include language concerts where songs in different languages are performed.

The presenters of the festival are by and large volunteers: language enthusiasts who agree to present one or more languages that they know without receiving any remuneration. However, in order to cover the expenses of holding the festival, some festivals introduce an entrance fee or ask visitors to donate if they like.
