= Daniil Orain =

Russian journalist (born 2000)

- Даниил Игоревич Ораин
- Born: 1 August 2000 (age 25); Cheboksary, Chuvashia, Russia
- Website: Daniil Orain on YouTube

Daniil Orain (Note: Russian: Даниил Игоревич Ораин (Note: In this name that follows East Slavic naming customs, the patronymic is Igorevich and the family name is Orain.)) (born 1 August 2000) is a Russian journalist known for his YouTube channel "1420 by Daniil Orain" in which he interviewed Russians in the street who agreed to comment on various political topics, including the Russian invasion of Ukraine. In typical interview sessions, he asked the same question to a variety of pedestrians in a busy public area to create a vox populi report. In May and July 2024, Orain said that the channel would be "archived", and on his personal channel, he explained that he felt burned out from his work and wants to focus on other projects in the future. By late 2022, Orain said that his colleague Artyom conducted most of the street interviews, while Orain led a seven-person team, devised questions and edited the footage.

== Career ==
The name "1420" comes from Moscow Public School No. 1420, which is where Orain went to high school.

In an interview with The Jerusalem Post, Orain shared that after asking many individuals the same question, the answers tend to repeat themselves. A common pattern regarding Russian politics is that some people support government decisions, some people oppose, and some people directly say that they do not wish to respond, often saying they are "apolitical".

In an interview with Der Standard, Orain shared that his approach to interviews is to ask simple open questions and to let people answer. "We [the pollers] do not insult anyone, including the government", Orain said.

In 2022, Orain was credited as an author on an episode of Arte's Eastern European magazine programme Tracks East.

In early 2023, the 1420 YouTube channel had about 300,000 viewers. Of those, 40% were from North America, and about 5% were from Russia. Orain established the channel in 2019 at which time he was asking people about LGBT rights in Russia and political opposition leader Alexei Navalny. The channel became much more popular when he started interviewing people after the Russian invasion of Ukraine.

One discovery in media conflict that Orain made is a difference in Russian and international views on the Bucha massacre. Several Moscow interviewees shown in one 2022 video questioned or denied the reports, calling it a hoax and propaganda.

A video was then posted in March 2024, and the channel was renamed to "Archives of 1420 by Daniil Orain".

Between May 2024 and August 2024, the channel was renamed back to "1420 by Daniil Orain", and was taken over by Orain's friend, Artyom. In a video meant as his last one, released on July 27, 2024, titled Where I've been, Orain states, "it's not interesting to me anymore [...] and [the] opinions of Russian people do not matter. [...] They will be sent to the front lines regardless.".

On September 21, 2024, Orain started a livestream titled "how is the channel back on track?", where he answered questions from viewers regarding the channel and his own life. In it, it is revealed that Orain attempted to go to Moldova, but was denied entry because of his Russian passport. In the September 2024 livestream, Orain said that he and Artyom are still in Russia. Artyom notes that he has a contingency plan ready for them both in case their lives are threatened.
