= Cheboksary =

Capital city of Chuvashia, Russia

Cheboksary Чебоксары
- City

Other transcription(s)
  - Chuvash: Шупашкар
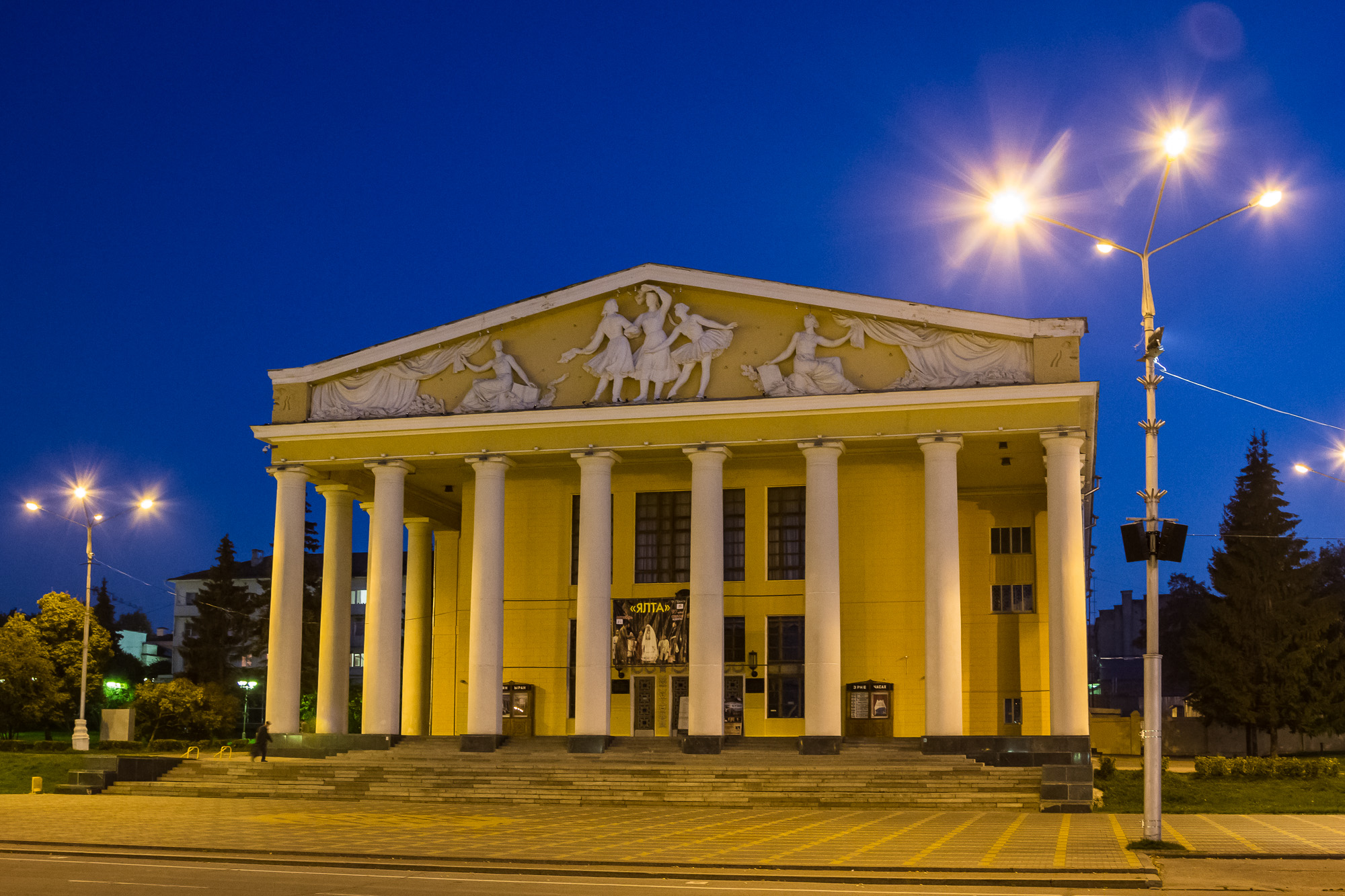
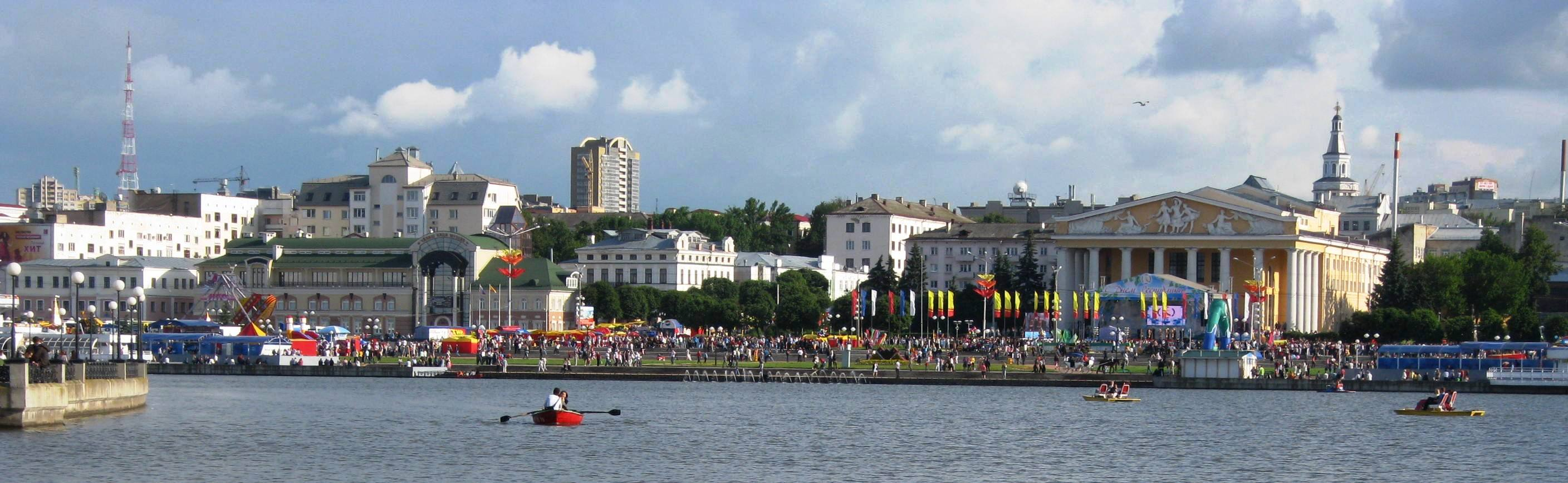
- Cheboksary Bay Monument of Military Glory Chuvash State Drama Theatre Rodina Cinema House of Soviets View of Cheboksary Bay

- Flag Coat of arms
- Anthem: Anthem of Cheboksary
- Interactive map of Cheboksary
- Location of Cheboksary Cheboksary (European Russia) Cheboksary (Europe)
- Coordinates: 56°09′N 47°14′E
- Country: Russia
- Federal subject: Chuvashia
- First mentioned: 1469
- City status since: 1781

Government
  - Body: City Assembly of Deputies
  - Head: Stanislav Trofimov

Area
  - Total: 250.9 km^{2} (96.9 sq mi)
- Elevation: 178 m (584 ft)

Population (2010 Census)
  - Total: 453,721
  - Estimate (2025): 497,061 (+9.6%)
  - Rank: 39th in 2010
  - Density: 1,808/km^{2} (4,684/sq mi)

Administrative status
  - Subordinated to: city of republic significance of Cheboksary
  - Capital of: Chuvash Republic
  - Capital of: city of republic significance of Cheboksary

Municipal status
  - Urban okrug: Cheboksary Urban Okrug
  - Capital of: Cheboksary Urban Okrug
- Time zone: UTC+3 (MSK)
- Postal codes: 428000–428006, 428008–428015, 428017–428025, 428027–428029,428031, 428032, 428034–428038, 428899, 428999, 996200
- Dialing code: +7 8352
- OKTMO ID: 97701000001
- City Day: Third Sunday of August
- Website: gov.cap.ru/main.asp?govid=81

Cheboksary (Note: /ˌtʃɛbɒkˈsɛəri/; Russian: Чебоксары [tɕɪbɐkˈsarɨ]; Chuvash: Шупашкар, romanized: Şupaşkar [ʂup̬aʂˈkar]) is the capital and largest city of Chuvashia, Russia. It is a port on the Volga River.

== Geography ==
The city is located in the Volga Upland region and stands on the shore of the Cheboksary Reservoir. Its area is 250.9 square kilometers (96.9 sq mi). The satellite city of Novocheboksarsk is located about 6 kilometers (3 1/2 mi) east of Cheboksary.

== History ==
Cheboksary was first mentioned in written sources in 1469, but according to archaeological excavations, the area had been populated much earlier. The site hosted a Bulgarian city of Veda Suvar, which appeared after Mongols defeated major Volga Bulgarian cities in the 13th century. During the Khanate period the town is believed by some to have had a Turkic (probably, Tatar) name Çabaqsar and that the current Russian and English names originate from it. However, in maps by European travelers it was marked as Cibocar (Pizzigano, 1367), Veda-Suar (Fra Mauro, 1459). Shupashkar, the Chuvash name, literally means the "fortress of the Chuvash".

In 1555, the Russians built a fortress and established a settlement here. In 1625, there were 458 soldiers quartered in Cheboksary, and in 1646 there were 661 males living in the settlement. At the end of the 17th century, Cheboksary was regarded as a major commercial city of the Volga region, and in 1781 it was granted town status within Kazan Governorate. In the beginning of the 19th century the population was about 5500, the town had a sawmill and several small manufactures.

In the 16th and the first half of the 17th century the Vvedensky cathedral, four monasteries and eight churches had been built, in the 18th century the stone buildings of treasury and archive, magistracy, court, and ten churches. In 1880, here were counted 783 houses (33 of them from stone), 91 stores, three schools, two hospitals, and one bank.

In the beginning of the 20th century, 5,100 people lived in Cheboksary. In 1965, the population grew to 163,000.

== Administrative and municipal status ==
Cheboksary is the capital of the republic. Within the framework of administrative divisions, it is, together with two urban-type settlements (Novye Lapsary and Sosnovka) and two rural localities, incorporated as the city of republic significance of Cheboksary—an administrative unit with the status equal to that of the districts. As a municipal division, the city of republic significance of Cheboksary is incorporated as Cheboksary Urban Okrug.

=== City divisions ===
For administrative purposes, Cheboksary is divided into three city districts: Kalininskiy, Leninskiy, and Moskovskiy.

== Demographics ==
Historical population
Year	Pop.	±%
1897	5,000	—
1926	9,000	+80.0%
1939	30,996	+244.4%
1959	104,374	+236.7%
1970	216,139	+107.1%
1979	307,599	+42.3%
1989	419,592	+36.4%
2002	440,621	+5.0%
2010	453,721	+3.0%
2021	497,807	+9.7%
Source: Census data

Population: 497,807 (2021 census); 453,721 (2010 census); 440,621 (2002 census); 419,592 (1989 Soviet census).

The city of Cheboksary together with the satellite city Novocheboksarsk forms a polycentric agglomeration with a population of more than 680 thousand people.

=== Ethnic composition ===
The population of Cheboksary consists mainly of the two following ethnic groups; the Chuvash (62%), and ethnic Russians (34%). Mixed marriages are quite common.

== Culture ==
Cheboksary possesses many cultural opportunities. These include the Public Order (Badge of Honor) Russian Drama Theater, a philharmonic orchestra, the Chuvash State Puppet Theater and numerous theaters (showing productions in both Russian and Chuvash languages). However, a very popular gathering place for the locals is the recently completed zaliv (bay), situated in the middle of the city. Cheboksary also has boardwalks and beaches along the Volga River, where people swim in the summer. There are also a number of heated pools, health clubs, and museums (including the Chuvash National Museum and Russia's only beer museum).

Cheboksary hosted a language festival in 1996.

=== Sport ===
Cheboksary regularly hosts athletics meetings and racewalking events, including the 2008 IAAF World Race Walking Cup, the 2015 European Team Championships Super League, and the 2016 Russian athletics and masters athletics championships. The 2016 IAAF World Race Walking Team Championships were moved from Cheboksary to Rome as part of IAAF sanctions against doping in Russia.

== Education ==
Educational institutions include the Chuvash State University, Chuvash State Agriculture Academy, the Chuvash State Pedagogical University, and the Cheboksary Cooperative Technical School.

- Cheboksary Physics and Mathematics School
- Cheboksary Cooperative Institute

== Economy ==
Cheboksary is located near the Cheboksary Dam generating up to 1,404 MW, with a reservoir of 2,274 square kilometers (878 sq mi). Cheboksary is the location of the headquarters of the Concern Tractor Plants, Russia's leading machine building company and one of the largest heavy mechanical engineering companies in the world.

== Transportation ==
=== Local public transportation ===
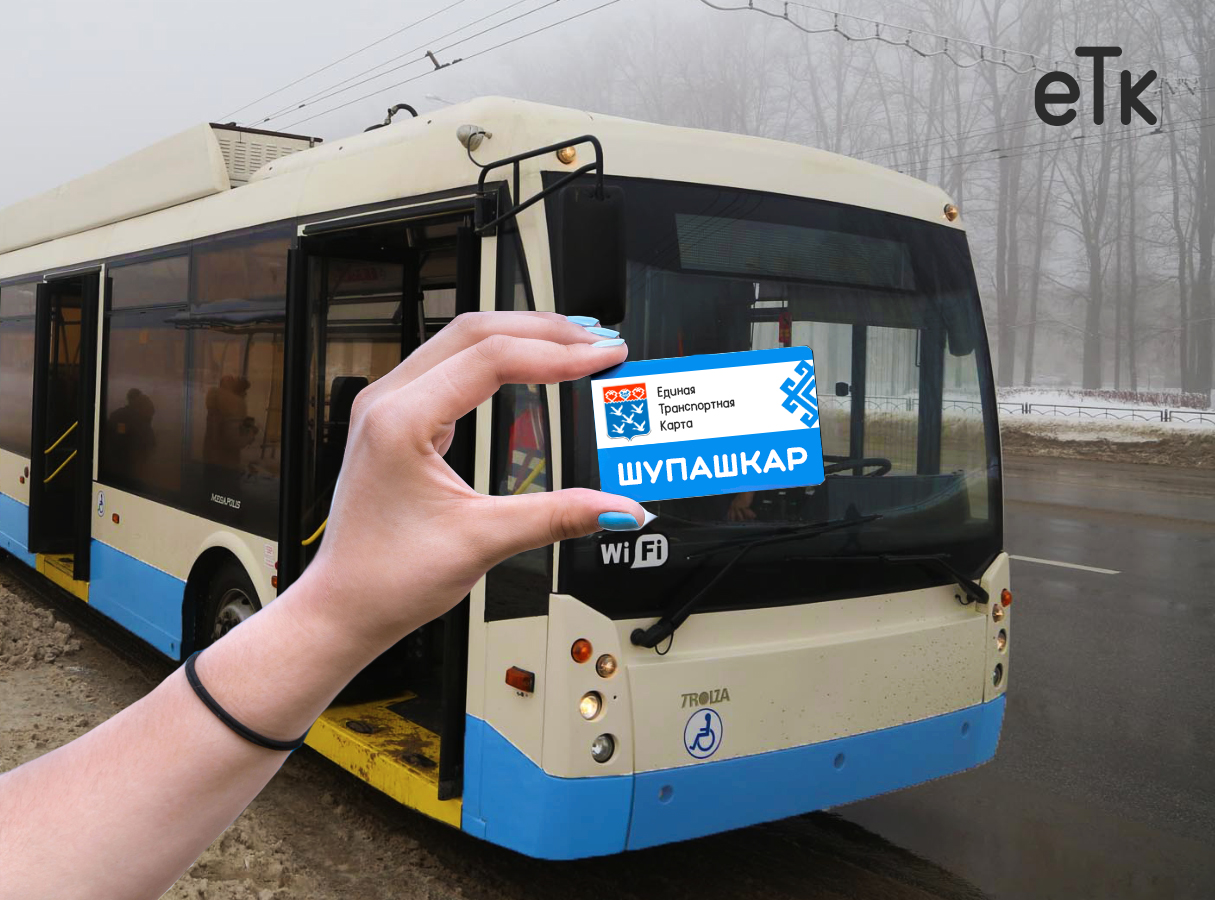
Cheboksary trolleybus, the blue stripe at the bottom symbolizes the Volga River

An extensive system of trolleybuses, autobuses, and minibuses covers the city, providing quick, convenient access to all parts of the city. For those who prefer taxis, there are several taxi agencies available, but the favorite means of transportation among locals are so-called "Gypsy" cabs. In Russia, anybody who owns a car is potentially a taxi. This can be a convenient way to get around but it is also potentially dangerous. Official taxis cost less than 6 dollars for travel between most points within the city.

=== River ===
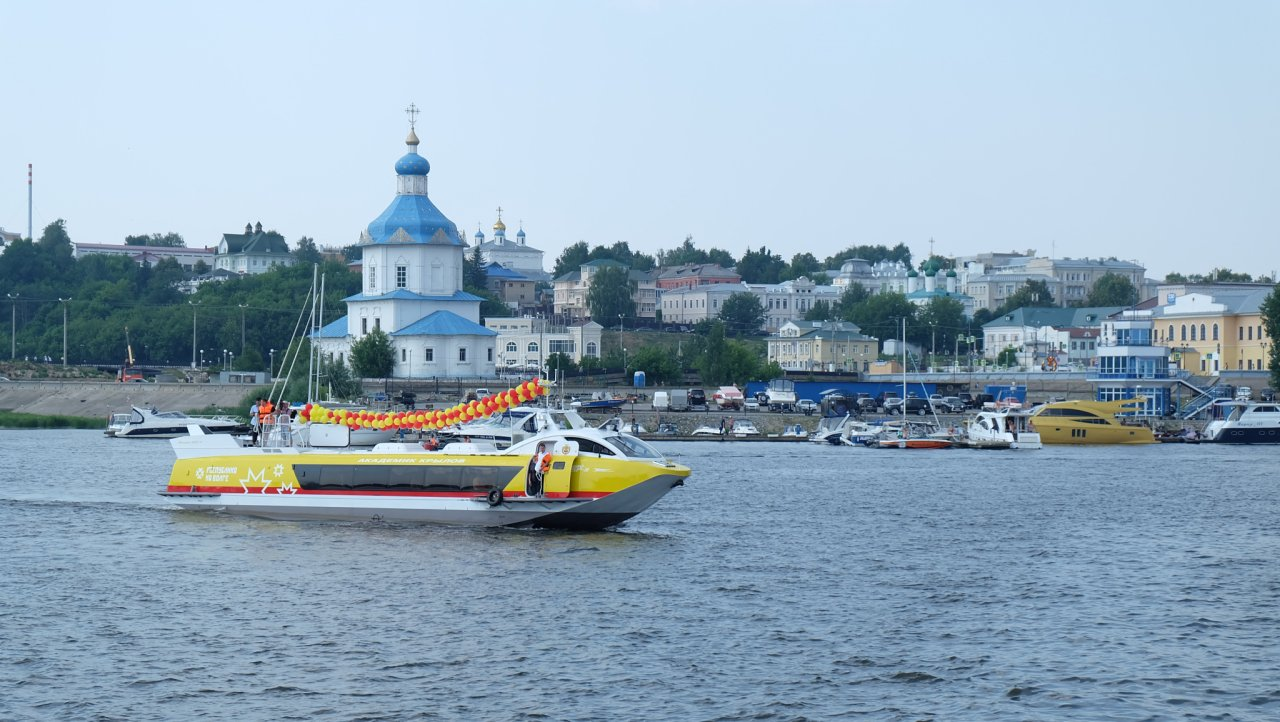
Intercity hydrofoil river tram in Chuvash colors

Because the Volga River runs through Chuvashia, Cheboksary is a frequent stop on the many boat tours that travel along the major cities up and down the Volga. To the south, Volgograd, Rostov-on-Don, Astrakhan, the Caspian Sea, and Black Sea are directly reachable. To the west, the Volga River connects Cheboksary with Nizhny Novgorod, Yaroslavl, Moscow, and the northern regions of Russia. By using river-sea vessels, it is possible to take cargo from Chuvash riverports all the way to Saint Petersburg, Novorossiysk (on the Black Sea), Astrakhan, and ports situated on the Danube river. However, the river is frozen from December to April.

=== Air ===
The Cheboksary Airport (IATA CSY, ICAO UWKS, international airport since 1995) receives both cargo and passenger aircraft of practically all types and sizes. There are regularly scheduled flights to Moscow and other destinations. Chuvashia Airlines was based at this airport until operations ceased in 2009. Cheboksary is located about a four-hour drive from Strigino International Airport near Nizhny Novgorod, which offers more flight connections.

== Climate ==
The climate in the region is continental (Köppen: Dfb), and it is similar to the climate in Moscow, although colder in winter, which lasts from late November until late March with a permanent snow cover.

Climate data for Cheboksary (1991–2020 normals, extremes 1929–present)
Month	Jan	Feb	Mar	Apr	May	Jun	Jul	Aug	Sep	Oct	Nov	Dec	Year
Record high °C (°F)	4.7 (40.5)	5.0 (41.0)	13.5 (56.3)	28.6 (83.5)	32.6 (90.7)	36.4 (97.5)	38.6 (101.5)	39.9 (103.8)	29.7 (85.5)	25.0 (77.0)	13.4 (56.1)	7.0 (44.6)	39.9 (103.8)
Mean daily maximum °C (°F)	−7.3 (18.9)	−6.6 (20.1)	−0.3 (31.5)	9.9 (49.8)	18.9 (66.0)	22.5 (72.5)	24.9 (76.8)	22.5 (72.5)	16.2 (61.2)	7.9 (46.2)	−0.6 (30.9)	−5.6 (21.9)	8.5 (47.3)
Daily mean °C (°F)	−10.0 (14.0)	−9.6 (14.7)	−3.6 (25.5)	5.3 (41.5)	13.4 (56.1)	17.5 (63.5)	19.7 (67.5)	17.4 (63.3)	11.7 (53.1)	4.7 (40.5)	−2.8 (27.0)	−8.0 (17.6)	4.6 (40.3)
Mean daily minimum °C (°F)	−12.7 (9.1)	−12.4 (9.7)	−6.6 (20.1)	1.3 (34.3)	8.3 (46.9)	12.7 (54.9)	14.9 (58.8)	13.0 (55.4)	8.0 (46.4)	2.1 (35.8)	−4.8 (23.4)	−10.4 (13.3)	1.1 (34.0)
Record low °C (°F)	−42.3 (−44.1)	−42.2 (−44.0)	−32.5 (−26.5)	−21.4 (−6.5)	−5.1 (22.8)	−4.8 (23.4)	1.7 (35.1)	−1.5 (29.3)	−7.5 (18.5)	−15.3 (4.5)	−29.9 (−21.8)	−44.3 (−47.7)	−44.3 (−47.7)
Average precipitation mm (inches)	32 (1.3)	24 (0.9)	29 (1.1)	33 (1.3)	41 (1.6)	64 (2.5)	70 (2.8)	59 (2.3)	51 (2.0)	58 (2.3)	43 (1.7)	36 (1.4)	540 (21.3)
Average rainy days	2	0	3	10	16	15	13	12	20	15	11	10	127
Average snowy days	25	16	16	4	0	0	0	0	0	7	14	23	105
Average relative humidity (%)	85	80	79	58	56	59	52	62	74	79	87	86	71
Source: Погода и Климат

== Media ==
- «To health via culture» — Journal of the World Health Culture Organization.

== Gallery ==
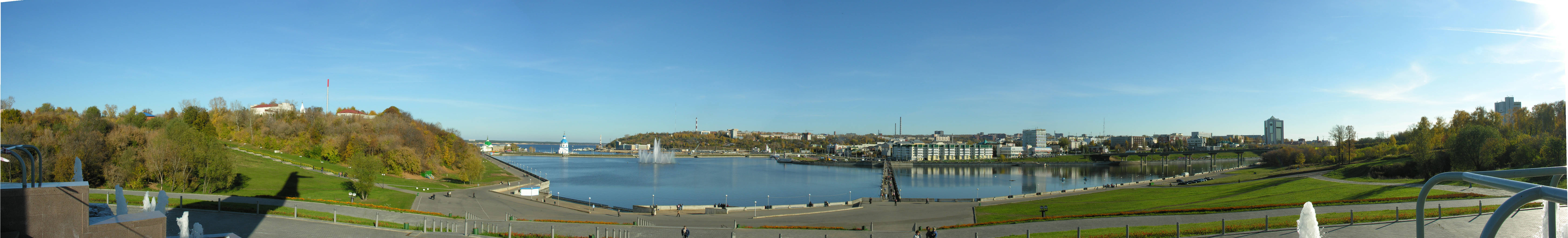
Cheboksary Bay 2003
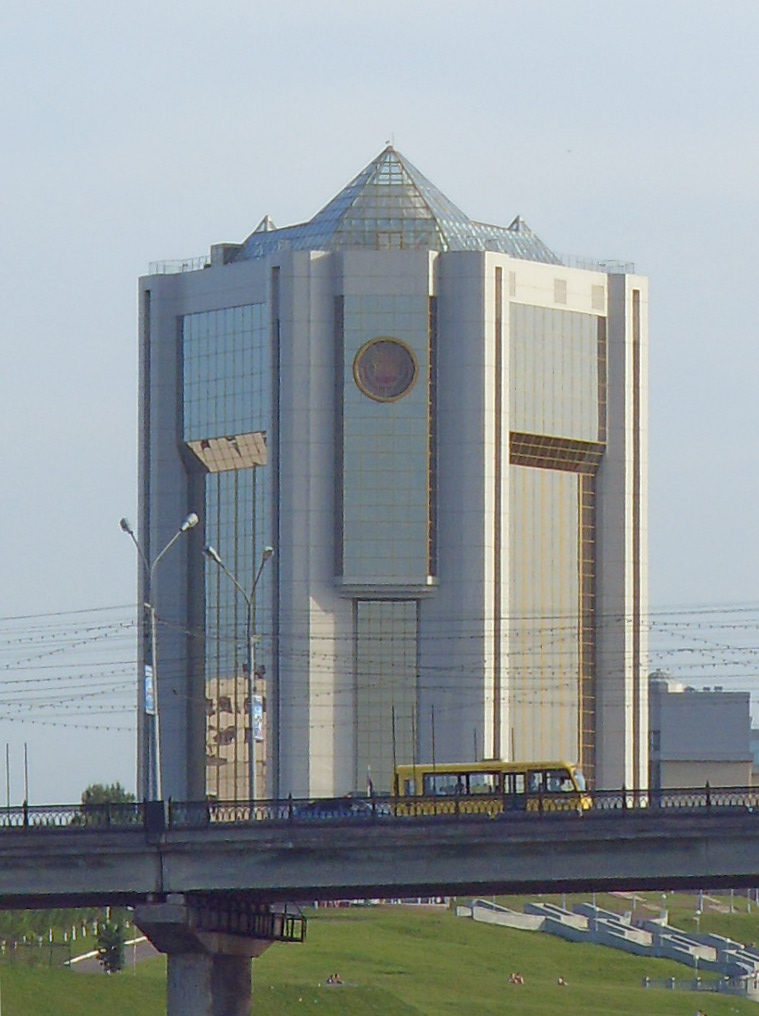
The new Government House of the Chuvash Republic

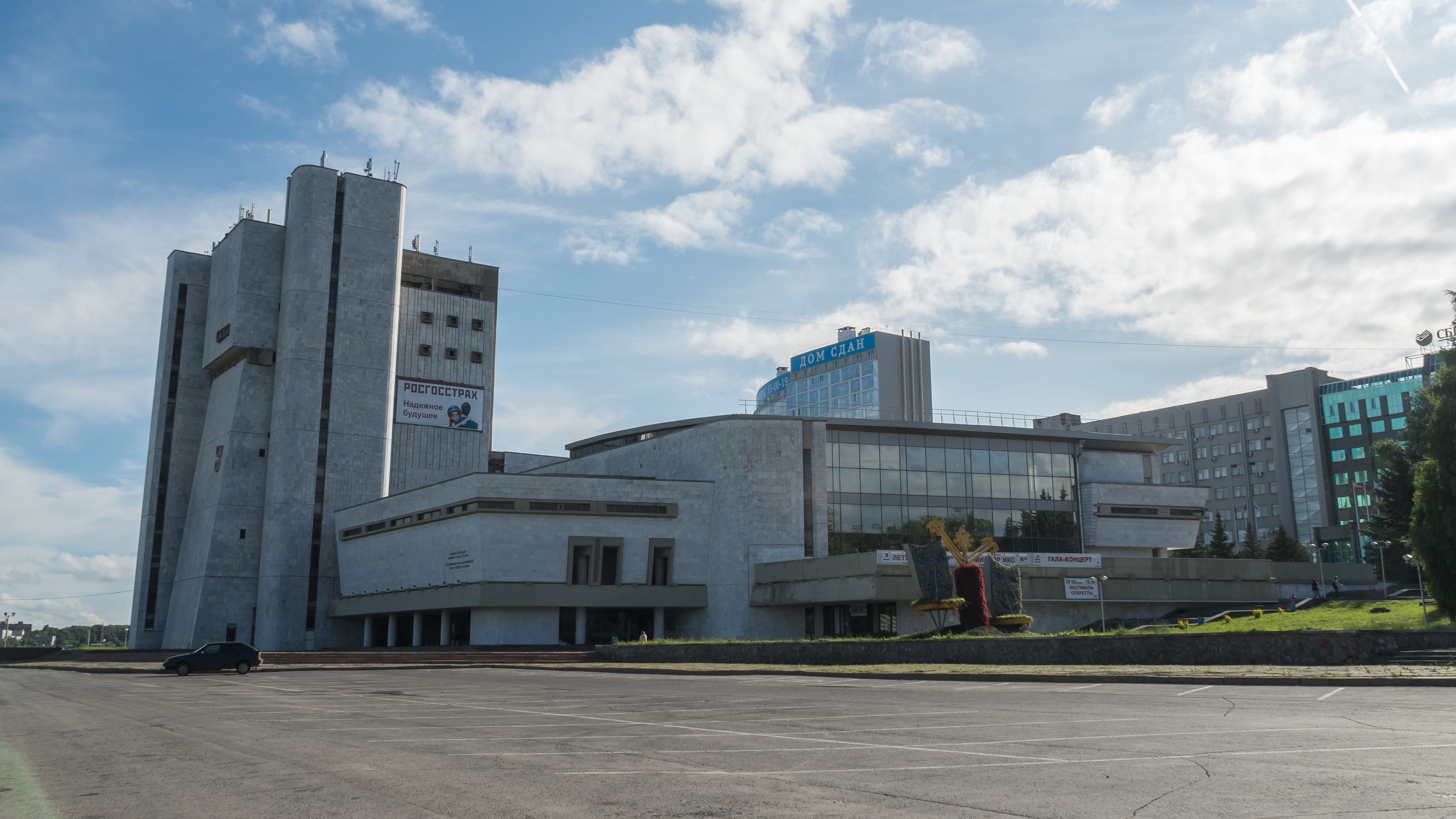
The Chuvash State Opera and Ballet Theater

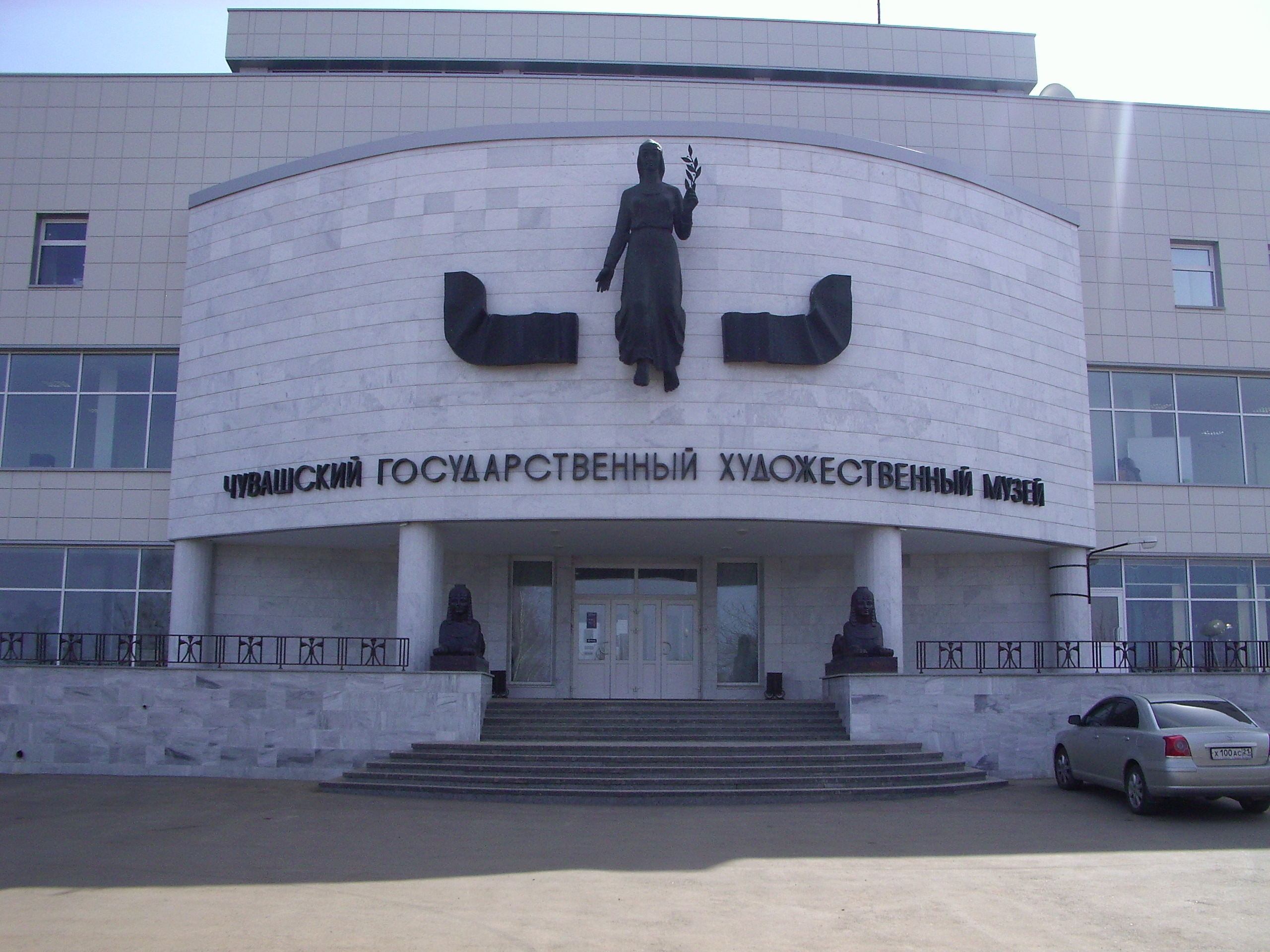
Chuvash State Art Museum

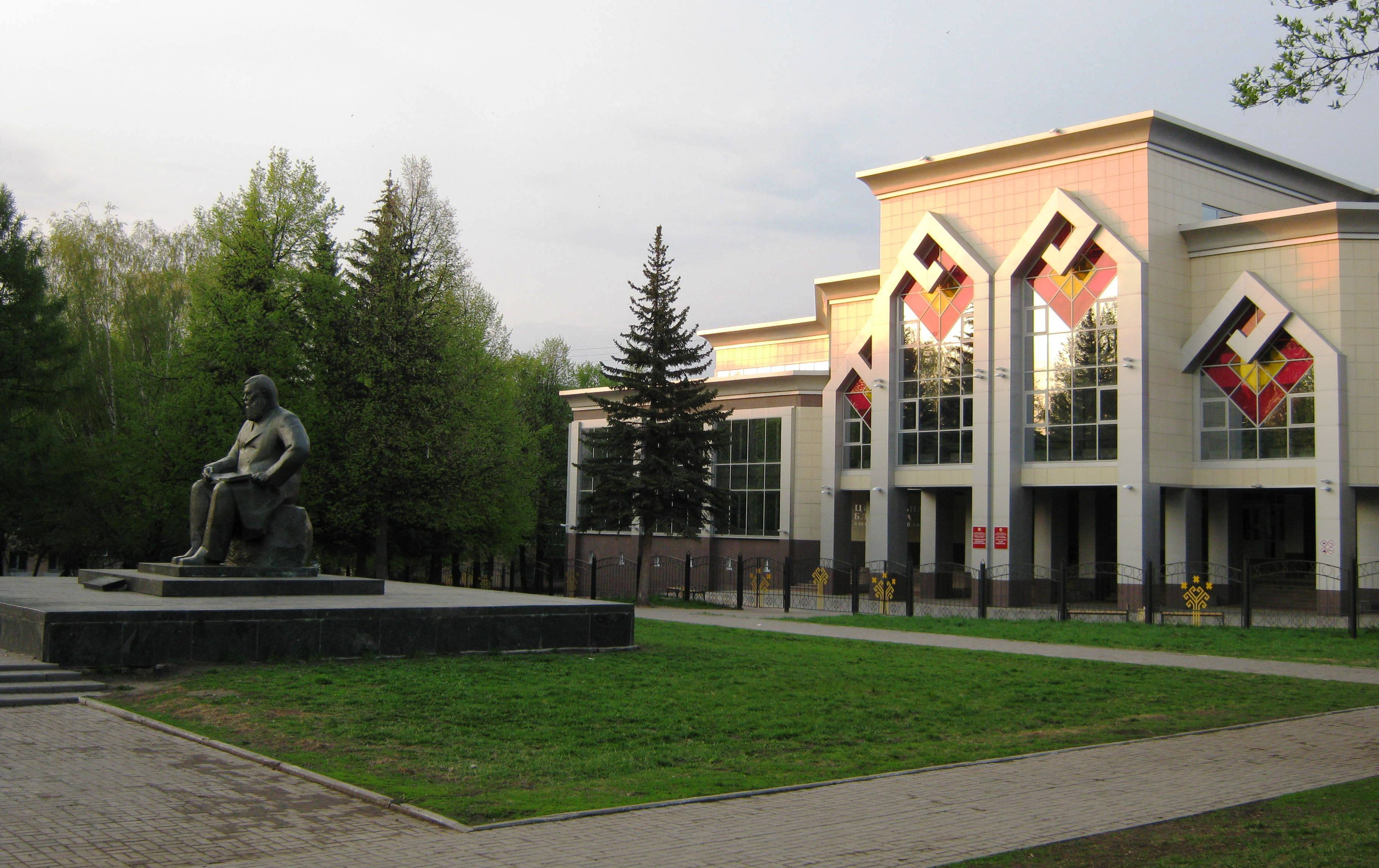
Chuvash National Library

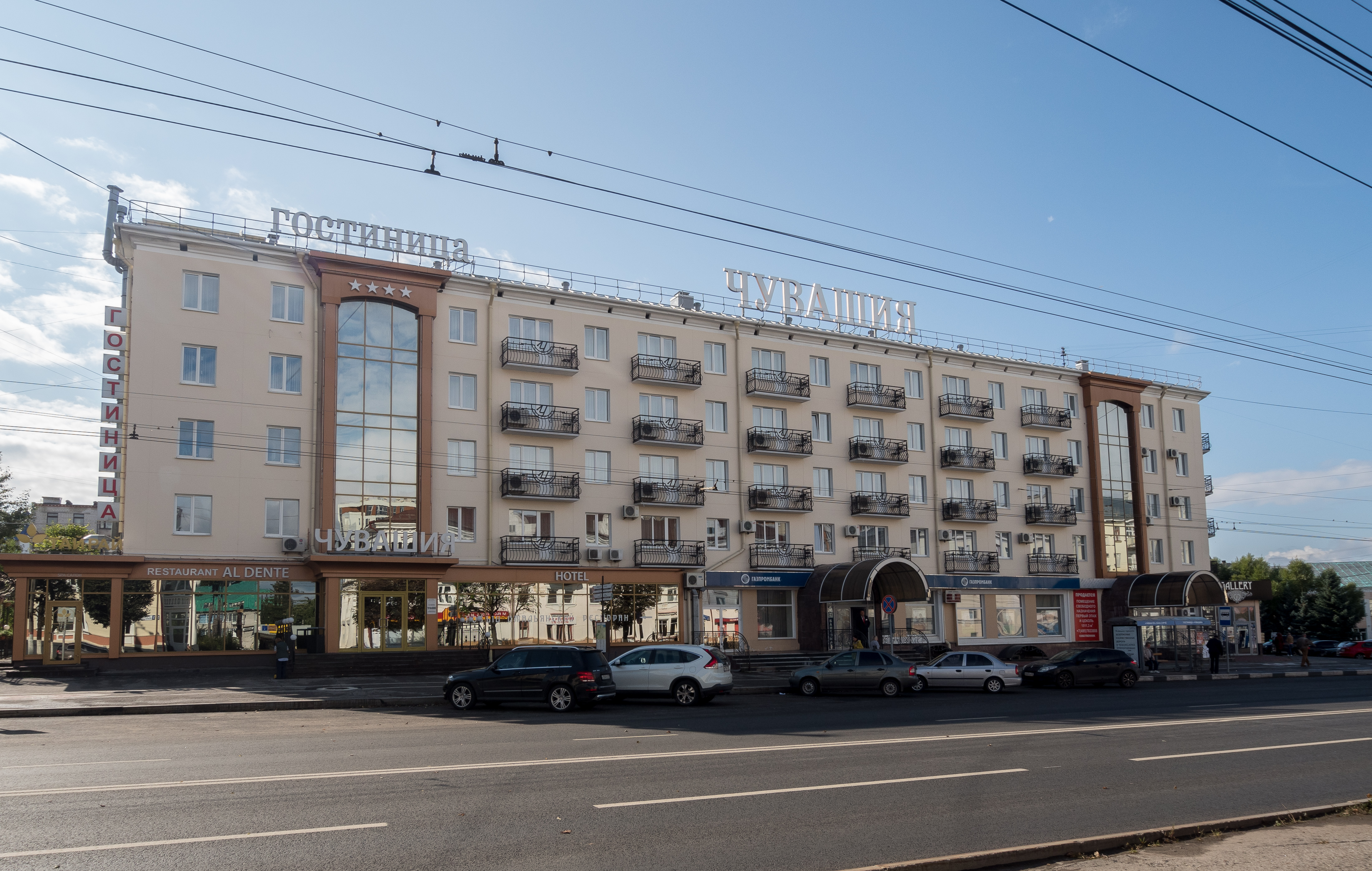
Chuvashia Hotel

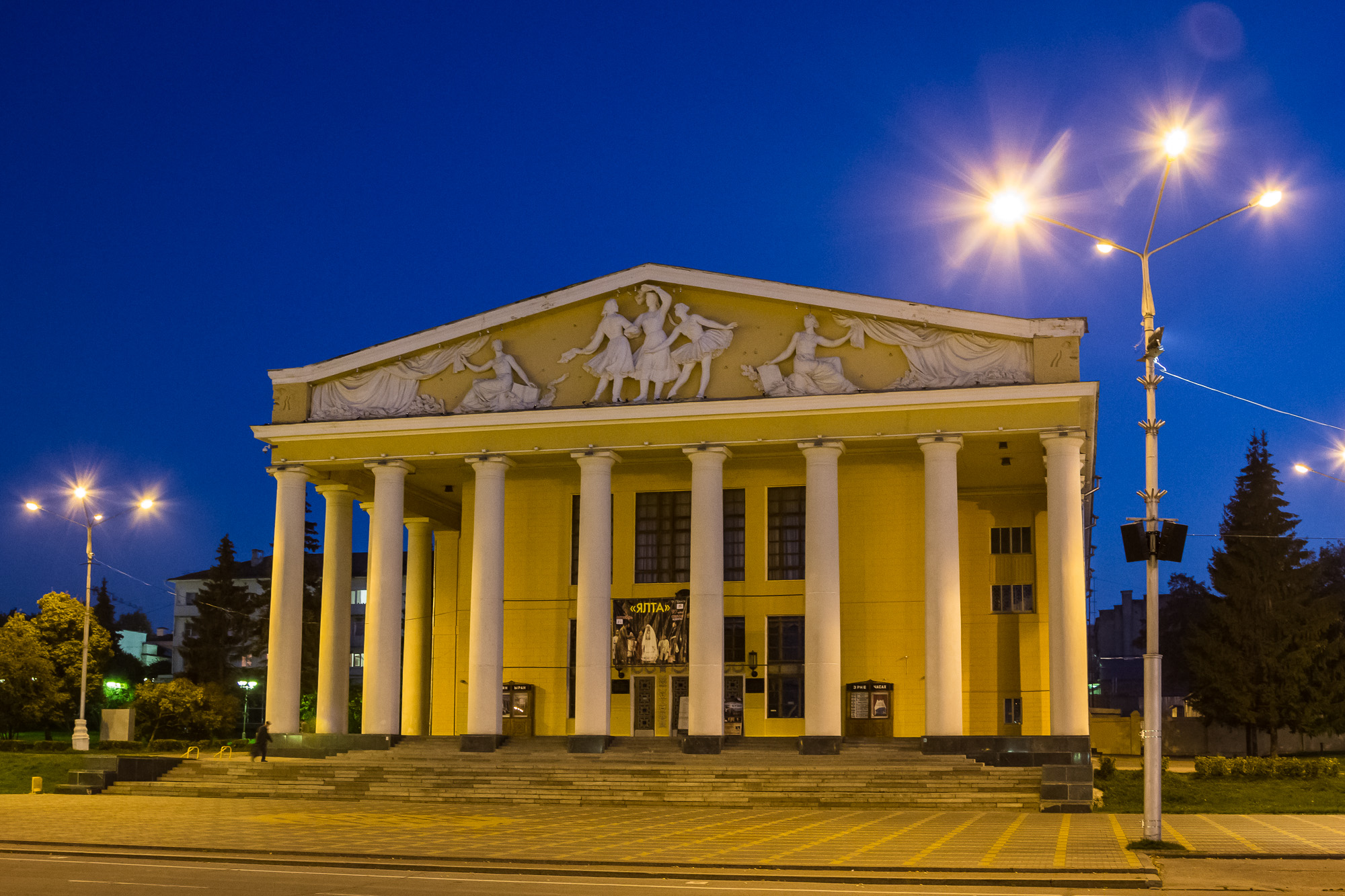
Chuvash Drama Theater

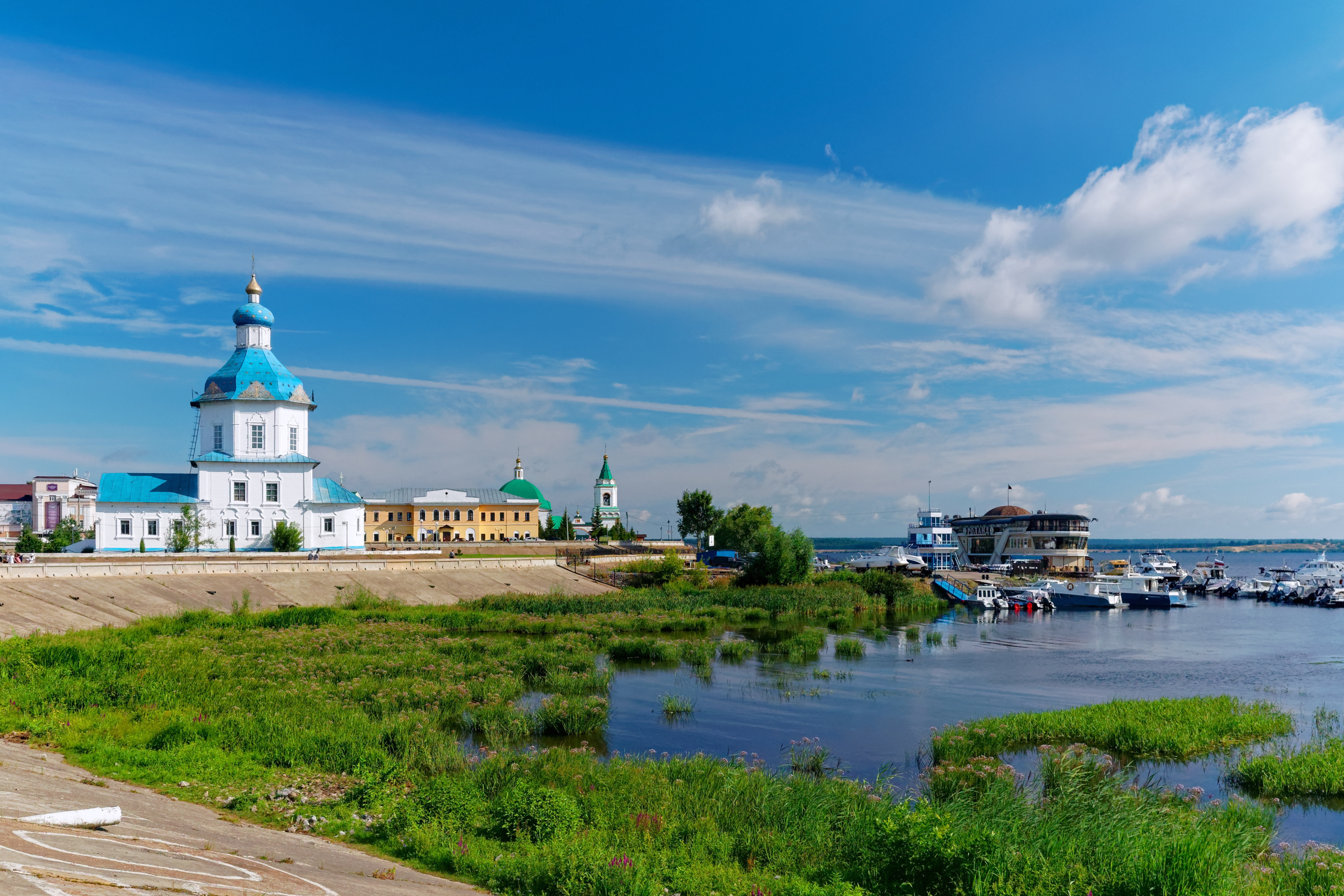
Assumption Church

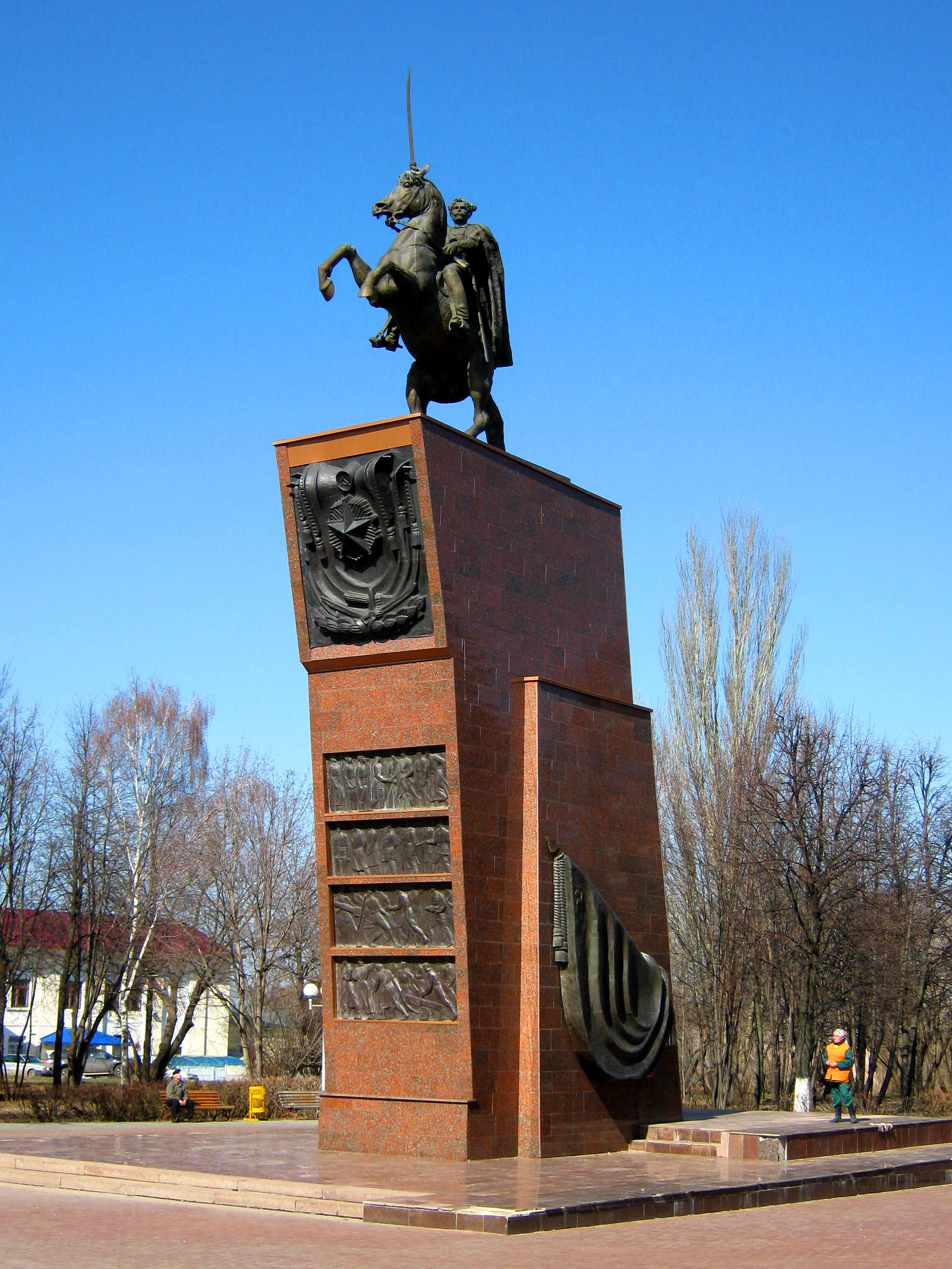
Monument of Vasily Chapaev

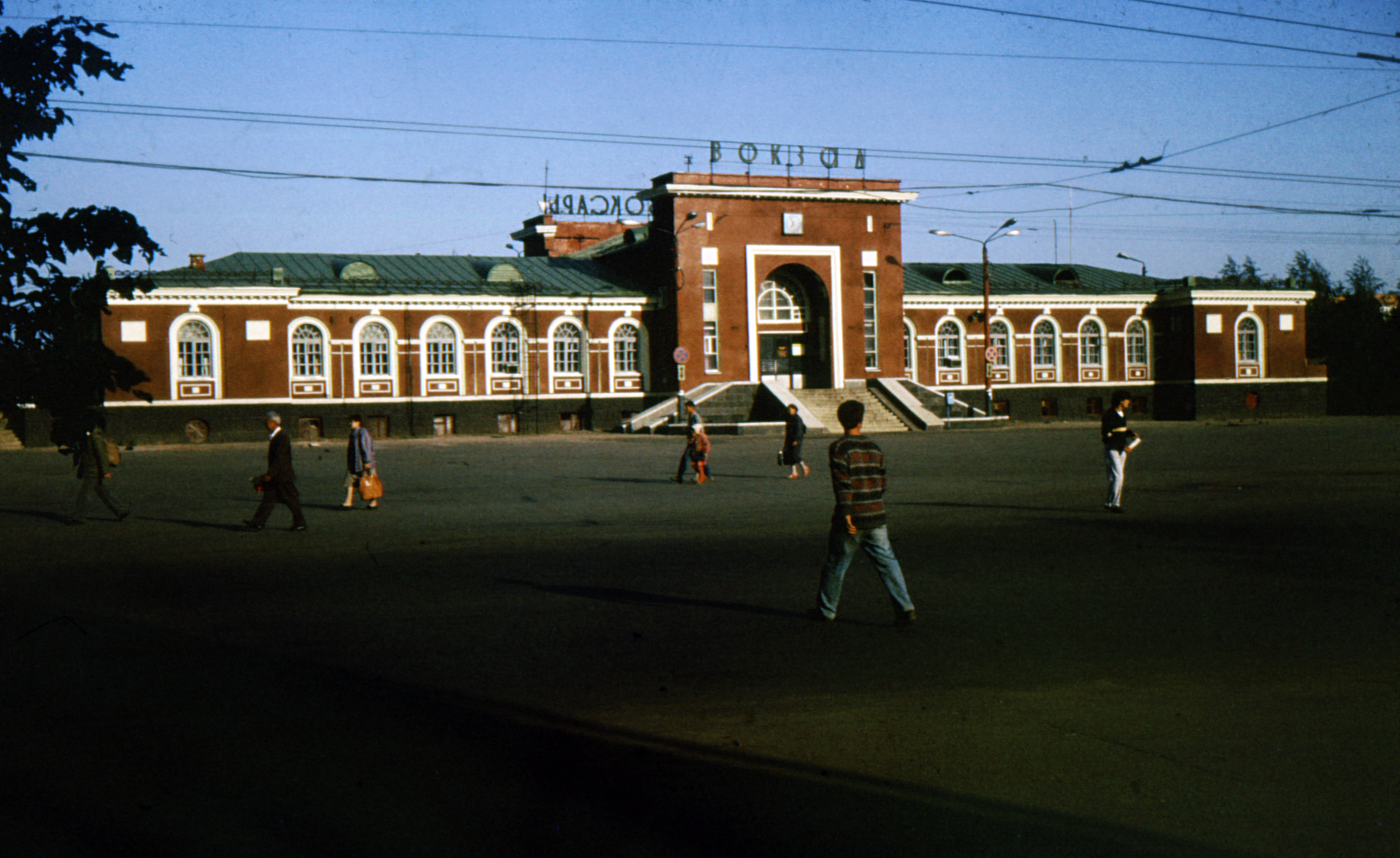
Cheboksary railway station before reconstruction

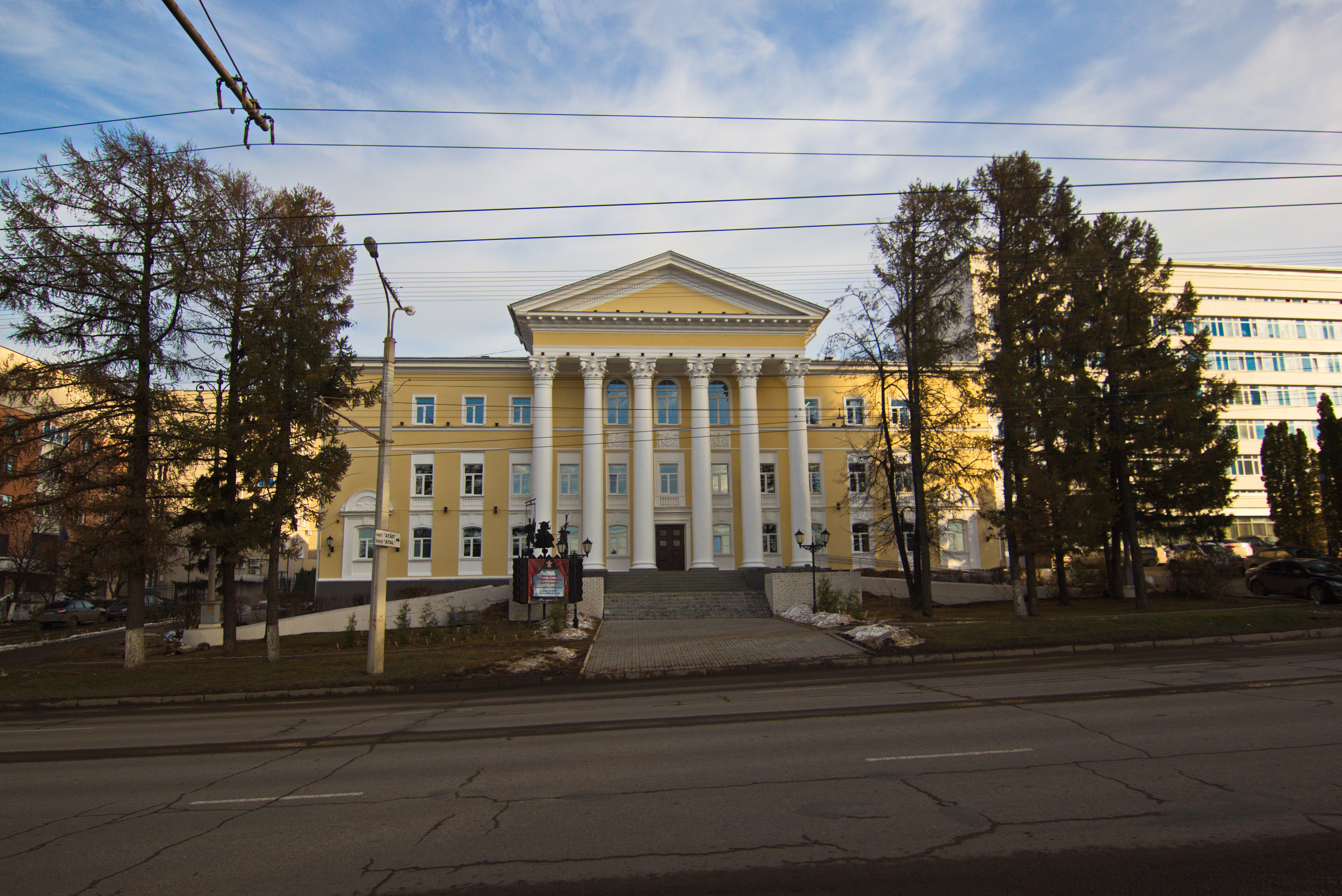
Chuvash State Puppet Theater

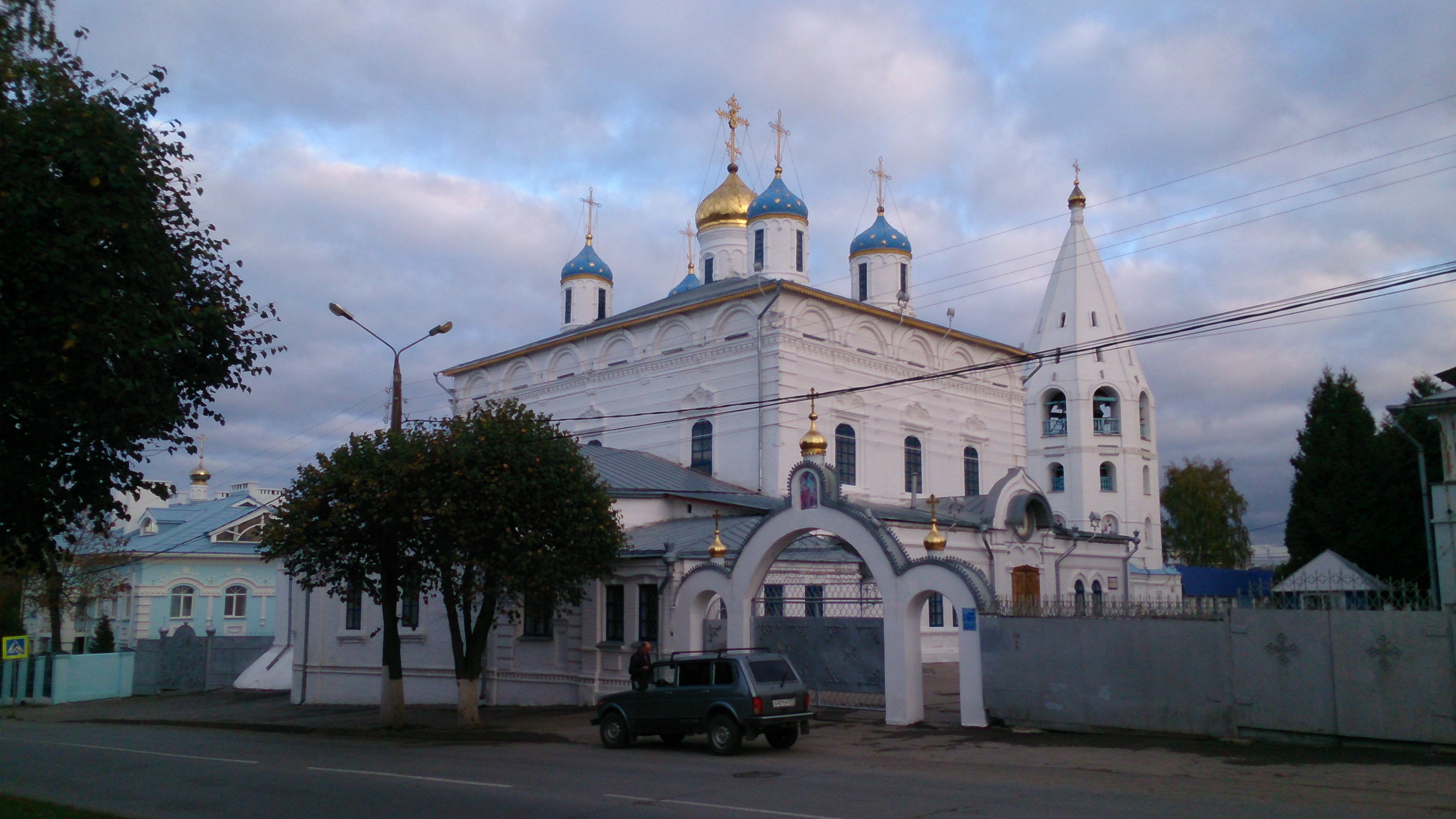
Vvedensky Cathedral

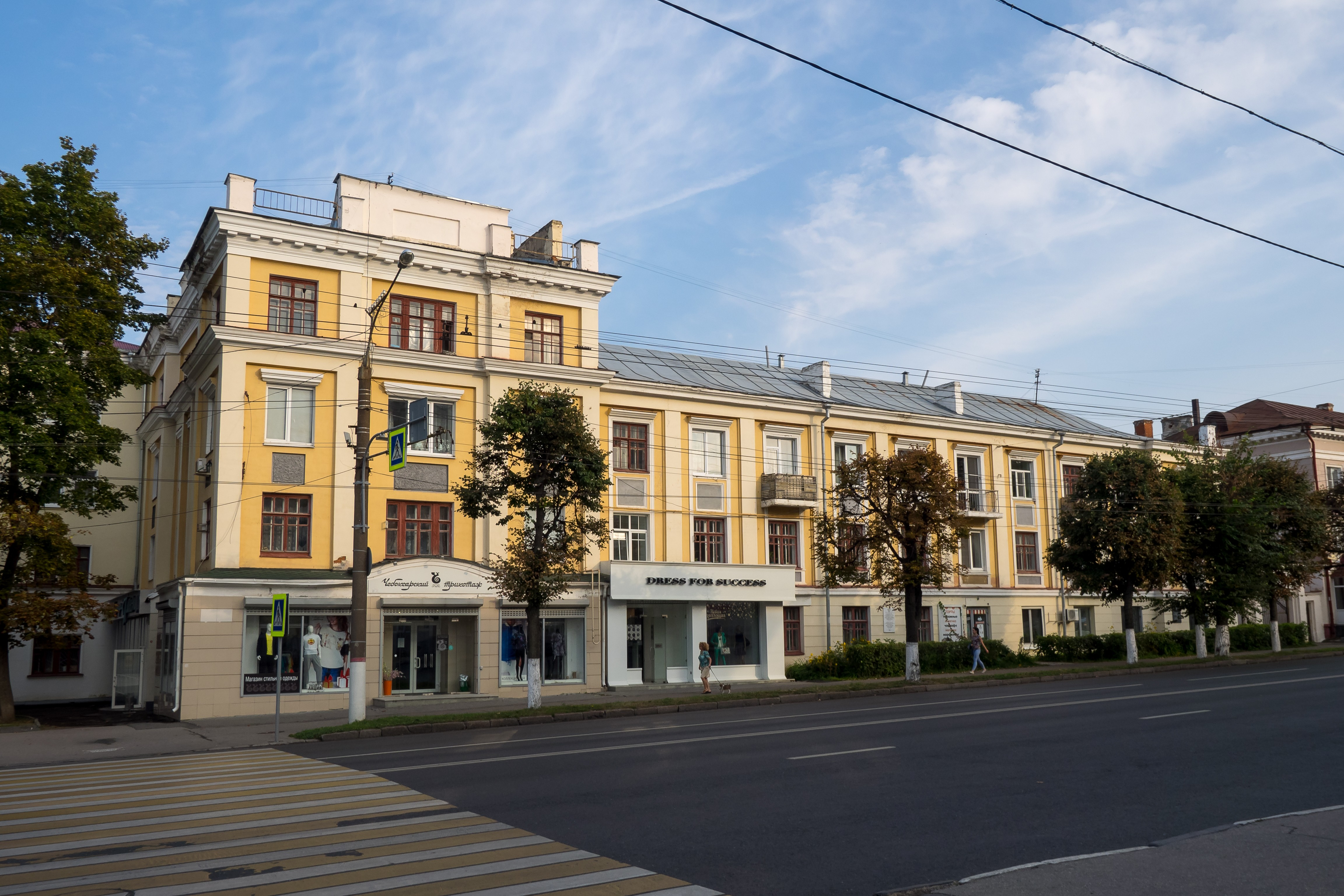
Old house, architectural monument

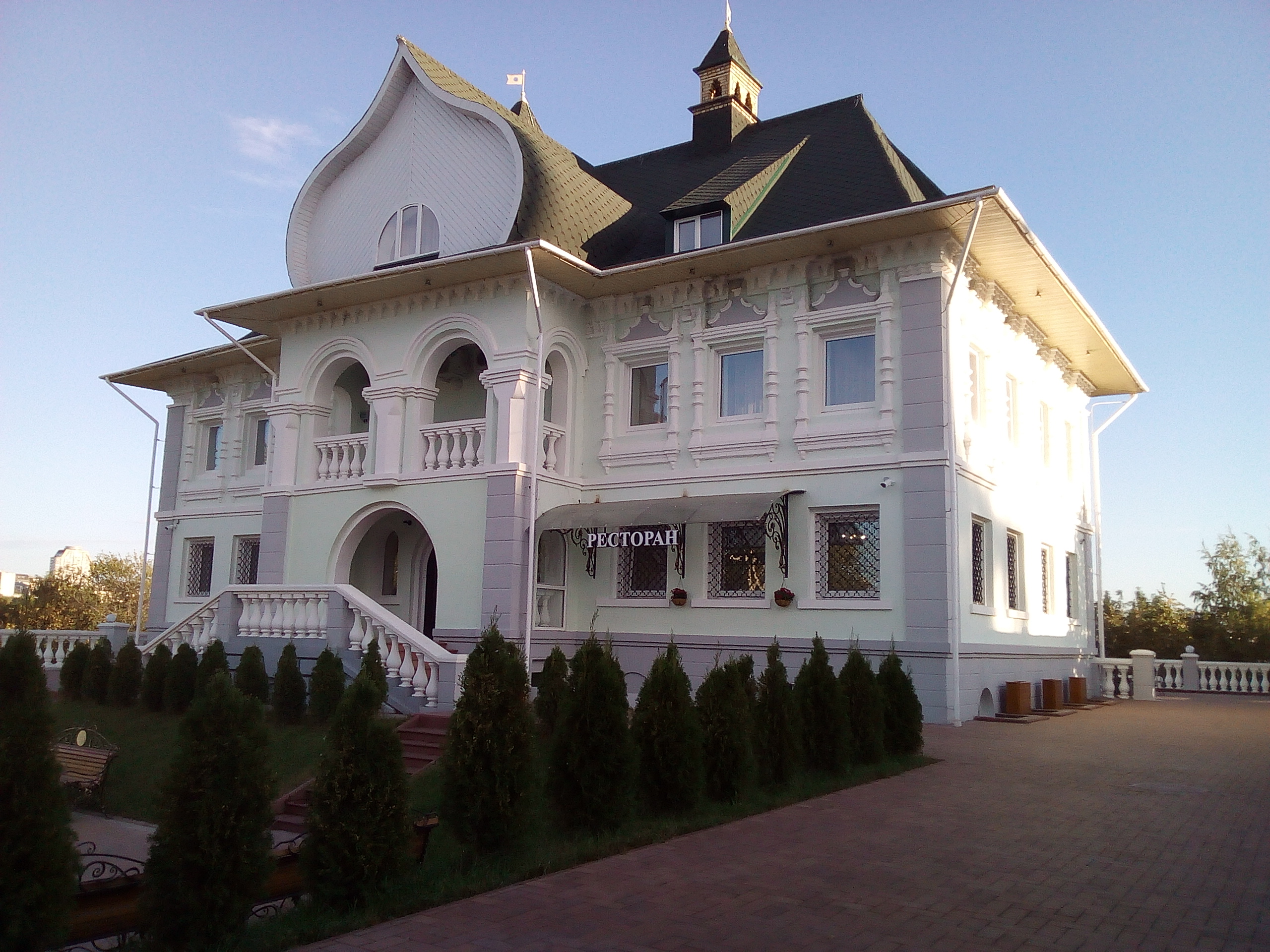
the old house of the merchant Kadomtsev

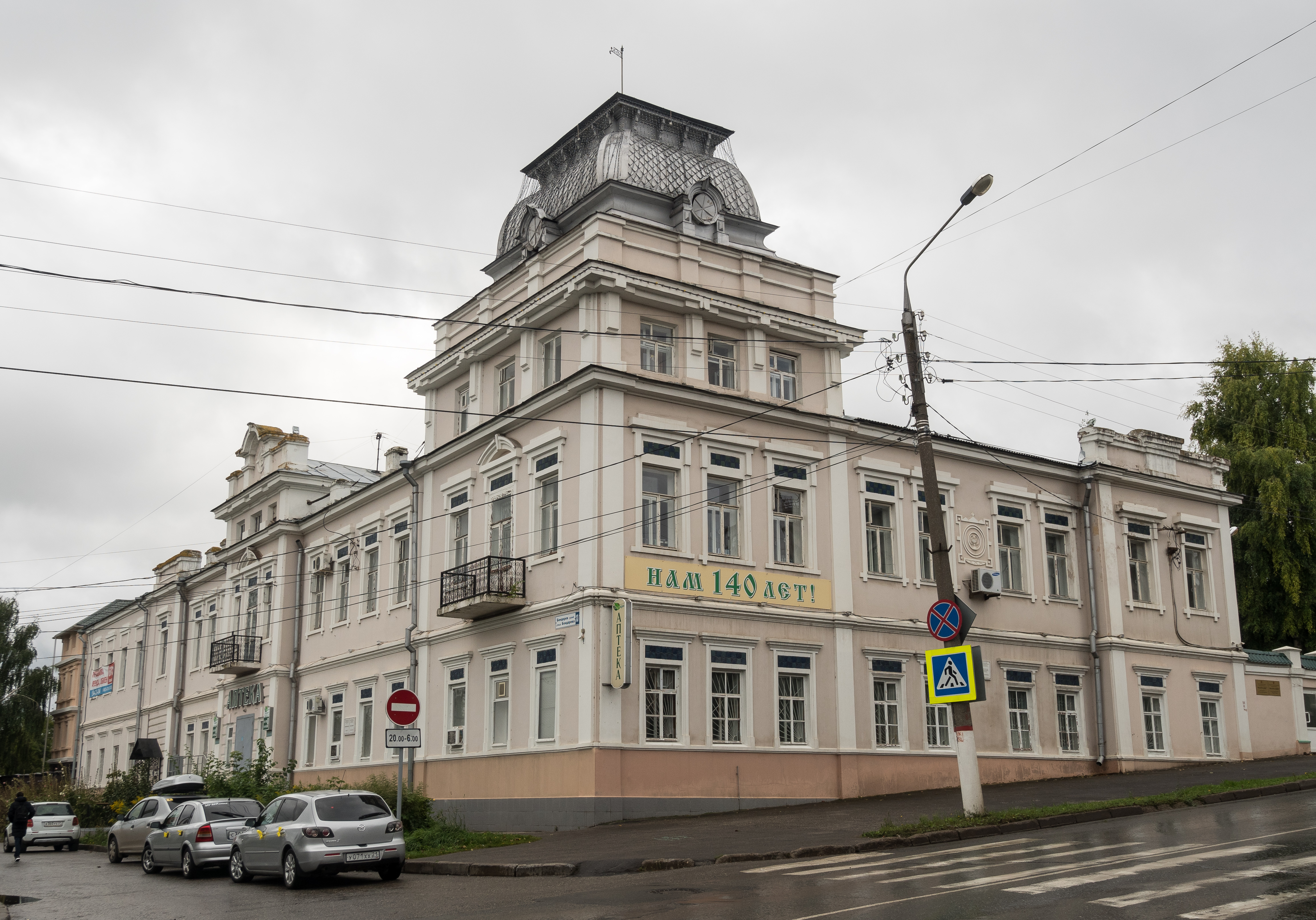
The oldest pharmacy Cheboksary

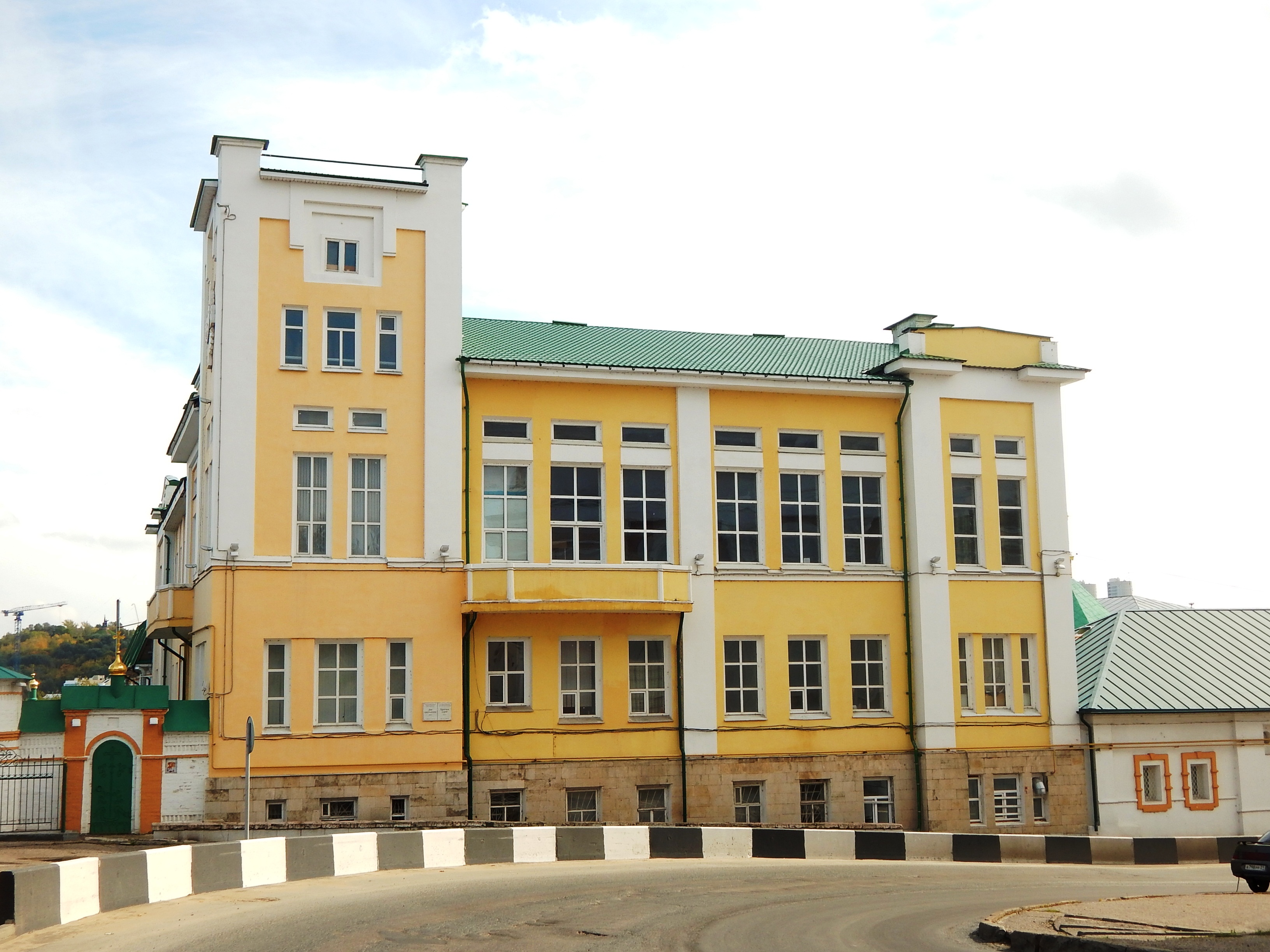
Peasant's House

== Notable people ==
- Marie Vorobieff (1892–1984), Russian-born painter
- Andriyan Nikolayev (1929–2004), Soviet cosmonaut
- Daniil Orain (born 2000), Russian journalist
- Yuri Yevlampyev (born 1966), former Russian professional footballer

== Twin towns – sister cities ==
Cheboksary is twinned with:

- Afyonkarahisar, Turkey
- Eger, Hungary
- Grodno, Belarus
- Rundu, Namibia
- Santa Clara, Cuba
