= Cheboksary Cooperative Institute =

Educational institute in Chuvashia, Russia

Cheboksary Cooperative Institute is an educational institute in Cheboksary. The institute had an ongoing exchange of students and professors with counterparts in Syracuse University, Case Western Reserve University and Chuvash State University.
